= Lewis Carroll Shelf Award =

American literary award

The Lewis Carroll Shelf Award was an American literary award conferred on children's books by the University of Wisconsin–Madison School of Education annually from 1958 to 1979. Award-winning books were deemed to "belong on the same shelf" as Alice's Adventures in Wonderland and Through the Looking-Glass by Lewis Carroll, having enough of the qualities of his work.

Seventeen books were awarded in 1958, including only two from the 1950s. Seven were named in 1979, all except two from the 1970s. Although short, the last class was also diverse, with one wordless picture book, The Snowman (1978) by Raymond Briggs, and one fictionalized biography, The Road from Home (1979) by David Kherdian, about his mother's childhood during the Armenian genocide and its aftermath.

The selection process included nominations by trade paperback editors, who were permitted to name one book annually from their trade catalogs. The Component Analysis Selector Tool rated trade books on authenticity, universality, insight, symbol systems–craftsmanship, impact, genre comparison, field setting of reader and test of time. The purpose was to identify and promote outstanding thoughts among the mediocre communications available in an open society.

The list was established by Dr. David C. Davis with the assistance of Professor Lola Pierstorff, Director Instructional Materials Center, University of Wisconsin, and Madeline Allen Davis, WHA Wisconsin Public Radio. Awards were announced and presented at the annual Wisconsin Book Conference, which featured speakers such as Dr. Seuss, William Steig, Helga Sandburg, Arna Bontemps, Nat Hentoff, Paul Engle, Jean George, Ed Emberley, Charlemae Rollins, Watts poet Jimmy Sherman, Maurice Sendak, Holling C. Holling, Pamela Travers, Ann Nolan Clark, Louise Lemp, Frank Luther, and Ramon Coffman (Uncle Ray).

== Winners ==
1958

- Beatrix Potter, The Tale of Peter Rabbit (1902[1893]) ‡
- Kenneth Grahame, The Wind in the Willows (1908), originally unillustrated
- Hugh Lofting, The Story of Doctor Dolittle (1920) ‡
- A. A. Milne, The World of Pooh – comprising Winnie-the-Pooh (1926) and The House at Pooh Corner (1928), illus. E. H. Shepard
- Wanda Gág, Millions of Cats (1928) ‡
- Watty Piper, The Little Engine That Could (1930), illus. Lois Lenski
- Laura Ingalls Wilder, Little House in the Big Woods (1932), illus. Helen Sewell
- Carol Ryrie Brink, Caddie Woodlawn (1935), illus. Kate Seredy
- Glen Rounds, Ol' Paul, the Mighty Logger (1936) ‡
- James Cloyd Bowman, Pecos Bill: The Greatest Cowboy of All Time (1937), illus. Laura Bannon
- Richard and Florence Atwater, Mr. Popper's Penguins (1938), illus. Robert Lawson
- Esphyr Slobodkina, Caps for Sale (1938) ‡
- Dr. Seuss, Horton Hatches the Egg (1940) ‡
- Rachel Field, Prayer for a Child (1944), illustrated by Elizabeth Orton Jones who won the annual Caldecott Medal for that work
- Catherine Cate Coblentz, The Blue Cat of Castle Town (1949), illus. Janice Holland
- Eleanor Farjeon, The Little Bookroom (1955), illus. Edward Ardizzone
- René Guillot, The 397th White Elephant (1957), illus. Christian Heinrich

‡ illustrated by the author

1959

- Frances Hodgson Burnett, The Secret Garden (1911)
- Maj Lindman, Snipp, Snapp, Snurr and the Red Shoes; originally a Swedish series (1920s)
- Laura E. Richards, Tirra Lirra: New Rhymes and Old (1932)
- Jean de Brunhoff, Story of Babar (1933); originally French, Histoire de Babar (1931) ‡
- Kate Seredy, The White Stag (1937) ‡
- Claire Huchet Bishop, The Five Chinese Brothers (1938), illus. Kurt Wiese
- Armstrong Sperry, Call It Courage (1940) ‡
- Virginia Lee Burton, The Little House (1942) ‡
- Carolyn Treffinger, Li Lun, Lad of Courage (1947), illus. Kurt Wiese
- Leon Wilson, This Boy Cody (1950), illus. Ursula Koering
- E. B. White, Charlotte's Web (1952), illus. Garth Williams
- Alice Dalgliesh, The Courage of Sarah Noble (1954), illus. Leonard Weisgard
- Philippa Pearce, The Minnow Leads to Treasure (US); originally Minnow on the Say (1955)

‡ illustrated by the author

1960

- Rudyard Kipling, The Jungle Book (1894), illus. John Lockwood Kipling
- L. Leslie Brooke, Johnny Crow's Garden: A Picture Book (1903) ‡
- Elizabeth Foreman Lewis, Young Fu of the Upper Yangtze (1932), illus. Kurt Wiese
- Walter D. Edmonds, The Matchlock Gun (1941), illus. Paul Lantz
- H. A. Rey and Margret Rey, Curious George Takes a Job (1947) ‡
- Mary Norton, The Borrowers (1952), illus. Diana Stanley (UK), Beth and Joe Krush (US, 1953), first of the series of five novels and one short story The Borrowers
- Kathleen Lines, compiler, Lavender's Blue: A Book of Nursery Rhymes (1954), illustrated by Harold Jones †
- Joseph Krumgold, Onion John (1959)
- Glen Rounds, The Blind Colt (1960) ‡

‡ illustrated by the author

† The British Library Association in 1955 gave illustrator Jones special commendation for its annual Carnegie Medal and established the companion Kate Greenaway Medal for children's book illustration.

1961

- Rachel Field, Hitty, Her First Hundred Years (1929), illus. Dorothy P. Lathrop
- Robert H. Charles, A Roundabout Turn (1930), illus. L. Leslie Brooke
- Dr. Seuss, And to Think That I Saw It on Mulberry Street (1937) ‡
- Robert Lawson, Ben and Me (1939) ‡
- Doris Gates, Blue Willow (1940), illus. Paul Lantz
- Eleanor Estes, The Moffats (1941), illus. Louis Slobodkin
- Marguerite Henry, Misty of Chincoteague (1947)
- Marguerite de Angeli, The Door in the Wall (1949) ‡
- Erich Kästner, When I Was A Little Boy (1959); originally German, Als ich ein kleiner Junge war (1957) – autobiography
- René Guillot, Grishka and the Bear (1959), illus. Joan Kiddell-Monroe; originally French, Grichka et son ours (1958)
- Scott O'Dell, Island of the Blue Dolphins (1960), originally unillustrated

‡ illustrated by the author

1962

- Hans Christian Andersen, Thumbelina; originally Danish, Tommelise (1835), illus. Vilhelm Pedersen
- Mark Twain, Adventures of Huckleberry Finn (1884), illus. E. W. Kemble
- Beatrix Potter, The Tailor of Gloucester (1903[1902]) ‡
- Charles Boardman Hawes, The Dark Frigate (1923)
- A. A. Milne, The World of Christopher Robin – comprising When We Were Very Young (1924) and Now We Are Six (1927), illus. E. H. Shepard
- Robert Davis, Padre Porko: The Gentlemanly Pig (1939), illus. Fritz Eichenberg
- Holling C. Holling, Paddle-to-the-Sea (1941) ‡
- Louise Rankin, Daughter of the Mountains (1948), illus. Kurt Wiese
- C. S. Lewis, The Lion, The Witch and The Wardrobe (1950), illus. Pauline Baynes
- William O. Steele, Winter Danger (1954)
- Walter de la Mare, A Penny a Day (1960 collection), illus. Paul E. Kennedy
- Leo Lionni, Inch by Inch (1960) ‡
- Sorche Nic Leodhas, Thistle and Thyme: Tales and Legends from Scotland (1962)

‡ illustrated by the author

1963

- Charles Kingsley, The Water-Babies, A Fairy Tale for a Land Baby (1863)
- Joel Chandler Harris, Uncle Remus, His Songs and Sayings: The Folk-Lore of the Old Plantation (1881[1880]), illus. Frederick S. Church and James H. Moser
- Frank R. Stockton, The Griffin and the Minor Canon (1885)
- Kenneth Grahame, The Reluctant Dragon (1898), illus. Maxfield Parrish
- Cornelia Meigs, Invincible Louisa: The Story of the Author of Little Women (1933), biography
- Marjorie Kinnan Rawlings, The Yearling (1938)
- Robert Lawson, Rabbit Hill (1944) ‡
- Eloise Jarvis McGraw, Moccasin Trail (1952)
- Meindert DeJong, The Wheel on the School (1954), illus. Maurice Sendak
- Philippa Pearce, Tom's Midnight Garden (1958), illus. Susan Einzig
- Rafaello Busoni, The Man Who Was Don Quixote: The Story of Miguel Cervantes (1958), biography
- Wilhelm Hauff, Dwarf Long Nose (1960), illus. Maurice Sendak; originally German, Der Zwerg Nase (1826)
- George Selden, The Cricket in Times Square (1960), illus. Garth Williams
- Jean Merrill, The Superlative Horse: A Tale of Ancient China (1961)
- Pauline Clarke, The Return of the Twelve (US); originally The Twelve and the Genii (1962), illus. Cecil Leslie
- Shirley Glubok, The Art of Ancient Egypt (1962)
- Hertha Seuberlich, Annuzza: A Girl of Romania (1962); originally German 1961(?)

‡ illustrated by the author

1964

- Hans Christian Andersen, The Nightingale; originally Danish, Nattergalen (1843), illus. Vilhelm Pedersen
- Frances Hodgson Burnett, A Little Princess (1905[1888]), illus. 1905 by Ethel Franklin Betts
- Félicité Lefèvre, The Cock, the Mouse, and the Little Red Hen: An Old Tale Retold (1925)
- Will James, Smoky the Cowhorse (1927), originally unillustrated
- Marjorie Flack, The Story About Ping (1933), illus. Kurt Wiese
- Ruth Sawyer, Roller Skates (1936), illus. Valenti Angelo
- Harold Keith, Rifles for Watie (1957)
- Aline Glasgow, Old Wind and Liu Li-San (1962), illus. Bernard Glasgow
- Madeleine L'Engle, A Wrinkle in Time (1962), illus. Ellen Raskin
- Joan Aiken, The Wolves of Willoughby Chase (1963)
- Helga Sandburg, Joel and the Wild Goose (1963), illus. Thomas Aquinas Daly
- Maurice Sendak, Where the Wild Things Are (1963) ‡
- Louisa R. Shotwell, Roosevelt Grady (1963), illus. Peter Burchard
- Jean Merrill, The Pushcart War (1964), illus. Ronni Solbert
- Anthony Fon Eisen, Bond of the Fire (1965), illus. W. T. Mars

‡ illustrated by the author

1965

- Jean Craighead George, My Side of the Mountain (1959)
- Sterling North, Rascal: A Memoir of a Better Era (1963)
- Irene Hunt, Across Five Aprils (1964), illus. Leroy Jenkins

1966

- Robert Louis Stevenson, A Child's Garden of Verses; originally Penny Whistles (1885)
- James Ramsey Ullman, Banner in the Sky (1954)
- Agnes Clifford Smith, An Edge of the Forest (1959)
- Peter Burchard, Jed, The Story of a Yankee Soldier and a Southern Boy (1960)
- Marcia Brown, Once a Mouse: A Fable Cut in Wood from Ancient India (1961) ‡

‡ illustrated by the author

1967

- 1967 – Rudyard Kipling, More Just So Stories
- 1967 – Mark Twain, Tom Sawyer (1876)

1968

- L. Frank Baum, The Wonderful Wizard of Oz (1900); illus. W. W. Denslow
- Rose Dobbs, No Room: An old story (1944), illus. Fritz Eichenberg
- Ruth Stiles Gannett, My Father's Dragon (1948) ‡
- Margot Benary-Isbert, The Ark (1953); originally German, Die Arche Noah (1948)
- Stephen Dunning, Edward Lueders, and Hugh Smith, eds., Reflections on a Gift of Watermelon Pickle... and other Modern Verse (1966) – anthology of modern poetry
- William Mayne, Earthfasts (1966)
- Barbara Emberley, Drummer Hoff (1967), illustrated by Ed Emberley who won the Caldecott Medal for that work
- E. L. Konigsburg, From the Mixed-Up Files of Mrs. Basil E. Frankweiler (1967) ‡
- George Mendoza, The Hunter I Might Have Been (1968), photographs by DeWayne Dalrymple
- Brinton Turkle, The Fiddler of High Lonesome (1968) ‡
- Jane Yolen, The Emperor and the Kite (1968), illustrated by Ed Young who won the Caldecott Medal for that work

‡ illustrated by the author

1969

- Hardie Gramatky, Little Toot (1939) ‡
- Maureen Daly, Seventeenth Summer (1942)
- Lucy M. Boston, The Children of Green Knowe (1954)
- Sid Fleischman, McBroom Tells the Truth (1966), illus. Kurt Werth
- Edmund Carpenter, ed., The Story of Comock the Eskimo as told to Robert Flaherty (1968), with Eskimo sketches
- Weyman Jones, Edge of Two Worlds (1968), illus. J. C. Kocsis
- Mehlli Gobhai, Usha the Mouse Maiden (1969) ‡ – Indian folk tale retold
- Glen Rounds, Wild Horses of the Red Desert (1969) ‡

‡ illustrated by the author

1970

- Howard Pyle, Otto of the Silver Hand (1888) ‡
- Phil Stong, Honk the Moose (1935), illus. Kurt Wiese
- Oliver Butterworth, The Enormous Egg (1956), illus. Louis Darling
- Elizabeth Enright, Gone-Away Lake (1957), illus. Joe and Beth Krush
- Alan Garner, The Weirdstone of Brisingamen (1960)
- Randall Jarrell, The Animal Family (1965), illus. Maurice Sendak
- Phillip Viereck, The Summer I Was Lost (1965)
- Betty Kelen, Gautama Buddha, In Life and Legend (1967) – biography
- Zilpha Keatley Snyder, The Egypt Game (1967)
- Betsy Byars, The Midnight Fox (1968), illus. Ann Grifalconi
- Astrid Lindgren, The Tomten (Swedish; English 1968?), based on the 1881 poem by Viktor Rydberg, illus. Harald Wiberg – see also Tomte
- Julius Lester, compiler, To Be a Slave (1968), illus. Tom Feelings
- William H. Armstrong, Sounder (1969), illus. James Barkley
- Eilís Dillon, A Herd of Deer (1969), US edition illus. Richard Kennedy
- Theodore Taylor, The Cay (1969)
- Jesse Stuart, Old Ben (1970), illus. Richard Cuffari

‡ illustrated by the author

1971

- Friedrich de la Motte Fouqué, Undine (German, 1811)
- James Weldon Johnson, Lift Every Voice and Sing (1899–1900), poetry
- Margery Williams, The Velveteen Rabbit (1922). illus. William Nicholson
- Ellis Credle, Down, Down the Mountain (1934) ‡
- Sheila Burnford, The Incredible Journey (1961), illus. Carl Burger
- Reginald Ottley, Boy Alone (1966); originally By the Sandhills of Yamboorah (1965), illus. Clyde Pearson
- Esther Hautzig, The Endless Steppe: Growing Up in Siberia (1968) – memoir
- Kristin Hunter, The Soul Brothers and Sister Lou (1968)
- Mary Q. Steele, Journey Outside (1969), illus. Rocco Negri
- Duncan Emrich, compiler, The Nonsense Book of Riddles, Rhymes, Tongue Twisters, Puzzles, and Jokes from American Folklore (1970), illus. Ib Ohlsson
- Rosemary Sutcliff, The Witch's Brat (1970), illus. Richard Lebenson
- Ida Chittum, Farmer Hoo and the Baboons (1971), illus. Glen Rounds

‡ illustrated by the author

1972

- Hope Newell, The Little Old Woman Who Used Her Head (1935), illus. Margaret Ruse
- Virginia Kahl, The Duchess Bakes a Cake (1955) ‡
- Nina Kosterina, The Diary of Nina Kosterina (1968); originally Russian (1964)
- Julia Cunningham, Dorp Dead (1965), illus. James J. Spanfeller
- James D. Forman, Ceremony of Innocence (1970)
- Jan Adkins, The Art and Industry of Sand Castles: Being an Illustrated Guide ... (1971) ‡
- William Pène du Bois, Bear Circus (1971) ‡
- Virginia Hamilton, The Planet of Junior Brown (1971)
- Russell Hoban, Emmet Otter's Jug-Band Christmas (1971), illustrated by Lillian Hoban
- Alexander Key, The Forgotten Door (1971)
- Robert C. O'Brien, Mrs. Frisby and the Rats of NIMH (1971), illus. Zena Bernstein
- Jay Williams, The Hawkstone (1971)
- Julius Lester, Long Journey Home: Stories from Black History (1972) – anthology
- Yuri Suhl, Simon Boom Gives a Wedding (1972), illus. Margot Zemach

‡ illustrated by the author

1973

- Edward Ardizzone, Little Tim and the Brave Sea Captain (1936) ‡
- Astrid Lindgren, Pippi Longstocking (US 1950), illus. Louis S. Glanzman; originally Swedish, Pippi Långstrump (1945), illus. Ingrid Nyman – first in a series
- Anne Holm, I Am David (1969), first US title, North to Freedom (1965); originally Danish, David (1963)
- Deborah Crawford, Four Women in a Violent Time (1970)
- Jean Russell Larson, Jack Tar (1970), illus. Mercer Mayer
- Marilyn Harris, The Runaway's Diary (1971)
- Charlotte Baker, Cockleburr Quarters (1972)
- Nancy Ekholm Burkert, illustrator, Snow White and the Seven Dwarfs: A Fairy Tale by the Brothers Grimm (1972); translated from the German Schneewittchen (1812)
- Julius Lester, The Knee High Man and Other Tales (1972), illus. Ralph Pinto – anthology
- Gerald McDermott, Anansi the Spider: A Tale from the Ashanti (1972) ‡
- Jane Yolen, The Girl Who Loved the Wind (1972), illus. Ed Young
- Lynd Ward, illustrator, The Silver Pony: A Story in Pictures (1973) – no text

1974
No award

1975

- Lewis Carroll, The Pig-Tale (1975[1893]), illustrated by Leonard B. Lubin – picture book with text by Carroll, verse from Sylvie and Bruno Concluded, chapter 23 (1893)
- Alice Childress, A Hero Ain't Nothing But A Sandwich (1973)
- Vera and Bill Cleaver, Dust of the Earth (1975)
- Leonard B. Lubin, illustrator, The Pig-Tale (1975), 1893 poem by Lewis Carroll, Sylvie and Bruno Concluded, chapter 23

1976

- Babbis Friis-Baastad, Don't Take Teddy (1967); originally Norwegian, Ikke ta Bamse (1964)
- Glen Rounds, The Day the Circus Came to Lone Tree (1973) ‡
- Harve Zemach, Duffy and the Devil (1973), illus. Margot Zemach
- Virginia Hamilton, M. C. Higgins, the Great (1974)
- Norma Fox Mazer, Saturday, the Twelfth of October (1975)

‡ illustrated by the author

1977

- Felice Holman, Slake's Limbo (1974)
- Nancy Willard, Sailing to Cythera and other Anatole Stories (1974), illus. David McPhail
- William Steig, Abel's Island (1976) ‡

‡ illustrated by the author

1978

- Verna Aardema, Who's in Rabbit's House?: A Masai Tale (1977[1969]), illus. Leo and Diane Dillon
- John Steptoe, Stevie (1969) ‡
- William Steig, Sylvester and the Magic Pebble (1970) ‡
- Natalie Babbitt, Tuck Everlasting (1975)
- Bettyanne Gray, Manya's Story (1976), later Manya's Story: Faith and Survival in Revolutionary Russia – biography
- Norma Fox Mazer, Dear Bill, Remember Me? and other stories (1976)
- Julia Cunningham, Come to the Edge (1977)
- Ilse Koehn, Mischling, Second Degree: My Childhood in Nazi Germany (1977) – autobiography
- Katherine Paterson, Bridge to Terabithia (1977), illus. Donna Diamond
- Peter Spier, Noah's Ark (1977) ‡
- Sonia Levitin, The No-Return Trail (1978) – about the Bartleson–Bidwell Party, fictionalized
- Glen Rounds, Mr. Yowder and the Giant Bull Snake (1978) ‡

‡ illustrated by the author

1979

- Bernard Waber, Lyle, Lyle, Crocodile (1965) ‡
- Ursula K. Le Guin, A Wizard of Earthsea (1968), illus. Ruth Robbins
- Robert Cormier, The Chocolate War (1974)
- Laurence Yep, Dragonwings (1975)
- Raymond Briggs, illustrator, The Snowman (1978) ‡ – no text
- David Kherdian, The Road from Home (1979) – fictionalized biography
- Nancy Willard, The Island of the Grass King: The Further Adventures of Anatole (1979), illus. David McPhail

‡ illustrated by the author
