= Minn of the Mississippi =

Book by Holling C. Holling

- Author: Holling Clancy Holling
- Language: English
- Subject: Natural history, snapping turtles-juvenile fiction, Voyages and travels-juvenile fiction
- Genre: Children's books, History, Geography, Natural history
- Publisher: Clarion Books
- Publication date: 1951
- Media type: Print
- ISBN: 978-0395273999

Minn of the Mississippi is a children's book written and illustrated by Holling Clancy Holling. First published in 1951, it received a Newbery Honor award the following year.

The book tells the story of a snapping turtle that hatches near the headwaters of the Mississippi River. She then goes on a journey down the river to Louisiana and the river's delta as the massive watercourse empties into the Gulf of Mexico. The turtle gets to see much of the Midwestern United States and American South along her way.

Like most of Holling's works, Minn is lushly illustrated, containing many full-page color paintings. Text pages are also generously illustrated with black-and-white pen-and-ink drawings, many with explanatory captions (to accompany the action of the story), in the margins.

== Synopsis ==
On a spring day in the early twentieth century, a common snapping turtle (Chelydra serpentina) hatches near Little Elk Lake in Minnesota's Itasca State Park. Soon after emergence the hatchling is hit by a stray bullet from a poacher's gun, amputating her left rear leg. She is then captured by an Ojibwe (Chippewa) boy who provides a protective pen in the lake where she can recover. The boy decides that the three-legged hatchling will have a difficult time surviving in the competitive ecosystem of Little Elk Lake, and takes the turtle with him when he accompanies a ranger from Itasca State Park on a trip into the headwaters of the Mississippi River. He paints the word "MINN" on her carapace and releases her into the Mississippi some 100 miles downstream from her birthplace.

Holling explains that Minn's missing back leg means that she can't "bottom-walk" upstream against the river's current during spring floods. Over the ensuing twenty-five years the turtle, destined always to move downstream, travels the entire course of the river. At times she moves away from the river or is deposited by floods in a tributary, swamp or pond, but she is always drawn or pushed back.

Minn's encounters with other animals, people, and the natural and human environments through which she travels allow Holling to discuss the ecology, geology, geography and human history of the river, as well as the natural history of snapping turtles. The narrative shifts among observations from Minn's perspective, explanations and descriptions by Holling as omniscient narrator, and dialog provided by the various human characters Minn encounters. Minn is captured several times by people intending to fatten her for the table, including a white family living in a shanty boat in the river north of St. Louis and an African American family living near the river south of Memphis. She always escapes from captivity or is freed by friendly people, but these encounters, along with her interactions with fishermen, hunters and tourists, enable Holling to illustrate the varieties of human life along the river and the people's attitudes towards wildlife and nature.

Minn eventually travels through New Orleans and reaches the Gulf of Mexico. She is swept into the Gulf and out to sea by a gale, and lands on a "sand island" in Barataria Bay. She is captured one final time by a pair of Cajun fishermen and taken to New Orleans for sale. A woman pays the fishermen to take her into Bayou Barataria and set her free. As the story ends, Minn is living among lost pirate treasures in the bayou. She encounters two more boys: first, an angry Anglo boy who tries to hit her with his boat pole, ranting about how the world looks down on him for being poor and what he would do if he had a million dollars (even as his pole is hitting the gold and jewels buried in the mud), and finally a Cajun boy who has the book's last word, expressing kinship with Minn as a fellow creature sharing a free life in the swamp.

== Context ==
Minn of the Mississippi is one of a series of children's travel and nature-themed books that Holling wrote in collaboration with his wife, artist and designer Lucille Webster Holling. Holling's original publisher, Houghton Mifflin, advertised the group of five books, which also included Paddle-to-the-Sea (1941), Tree in the Trail (1942), Seabird (1948) and Pagoo (1957), as the "famous Holling series." The books share a distinctive non-linear format in which the printed main narrative and color illustrations are juxtaposed with elaborate marginal content. Handwritten asides add context to the story and explore side topics, and sketched illustrations enrich both the main story line and the marginal notes. Holling described their approach as "the art of digression." He explained that "we feel that a book should lead outward. It should be a corridor, with many doors leading away from it. In our books the story opens out into the margins, and from there to a hundred things." Children's literature scholar Richard Kerper comments that this format "afforded mid-century viewer-readers the opportunity to construct their own text based on what they chose to attend to and what they chose to ignore," anticipating the digital formats with which twenty-first century children engage.

In other ways Minn of the Mississippi is typical of mid-twentieth century animal stories for children. Librarian Walter Hogan explains that mid-twentieth-century authors were "careful not to ascribe complex mental states to animals, and they avoid[ed] representing any animal's thoughts and feelings as if they were equivalent to humans." Holling took this approach in the book, and commented in an interview that "when we write about animals, they never talk. I hate books about animals that talk." The book also conforms to another pattern identified by Hogan, who writes that "there is no sense in that body of fiction that these or any other animals have an inherent right to freedom from human interference, or that it might be wrong for humans to eat the flesh of animals, wear their skins, or conduct experiments upon them."

== Reception ==
Minn of the Mississippi received a positive review from Kirkus Reviews, which wrote, "this new lovely picture book, bursting with legend, history, natural science, convincing personalities and even a few wise saws, has such a bountiful collection of loving detail and good story, that it is bound to keep the reader happy and busy for some time."

In 1952 Minn was a runner-up for the Newbery Medal, awarded by the American Library Association for "the most distinguished contribution to American literature for children." In 1971, when the new Newbery Honor Book title was retroactively applied to earlier runners up, it received this designation.

The Hollings' "art of digression" method of writing and illustrating books has inspired other creators of children's literature. Notably, illustrator Bob Marstell and book designer Hans Teensma, who along with author Lawrence Pringle created the Orbis Pictus Award-winning ALA Notable Book An Extraordinary Life: The Story of a Monarch Butterfly (1997) identified Minn of the Mississippi as a major influence on their work.
