= Robert Charles (disambiguation) =

Robert Charles (1865–1900) was an African American whose arrest led to the Robert Charles riots.

Robert Charles may also refer to:

- Sir Bob Charles (golfer) (born 1936), New Zealand professional golfer
- Bob Charles (politician) (1936–2016), Australian Liberal politician
- Bob Charles Beers (born 1967), American ice hockey player
- Bobby Charles (1938–2010), singer/songwriter
- Robert Charles (scholar) (1855–1931), Irish priest, biblical scholar and theologian
- Robert B. Charles (born 1960), United States Department of State official
- Robert H. Charles (1913–2000), United States Assistant Secretary of Defense
- Bob Charles (footballer) (1941–2014), professional football goalkeeper with Southampton FC in the 1960s

== Characters ==
- Bob Charles (Fair City)
