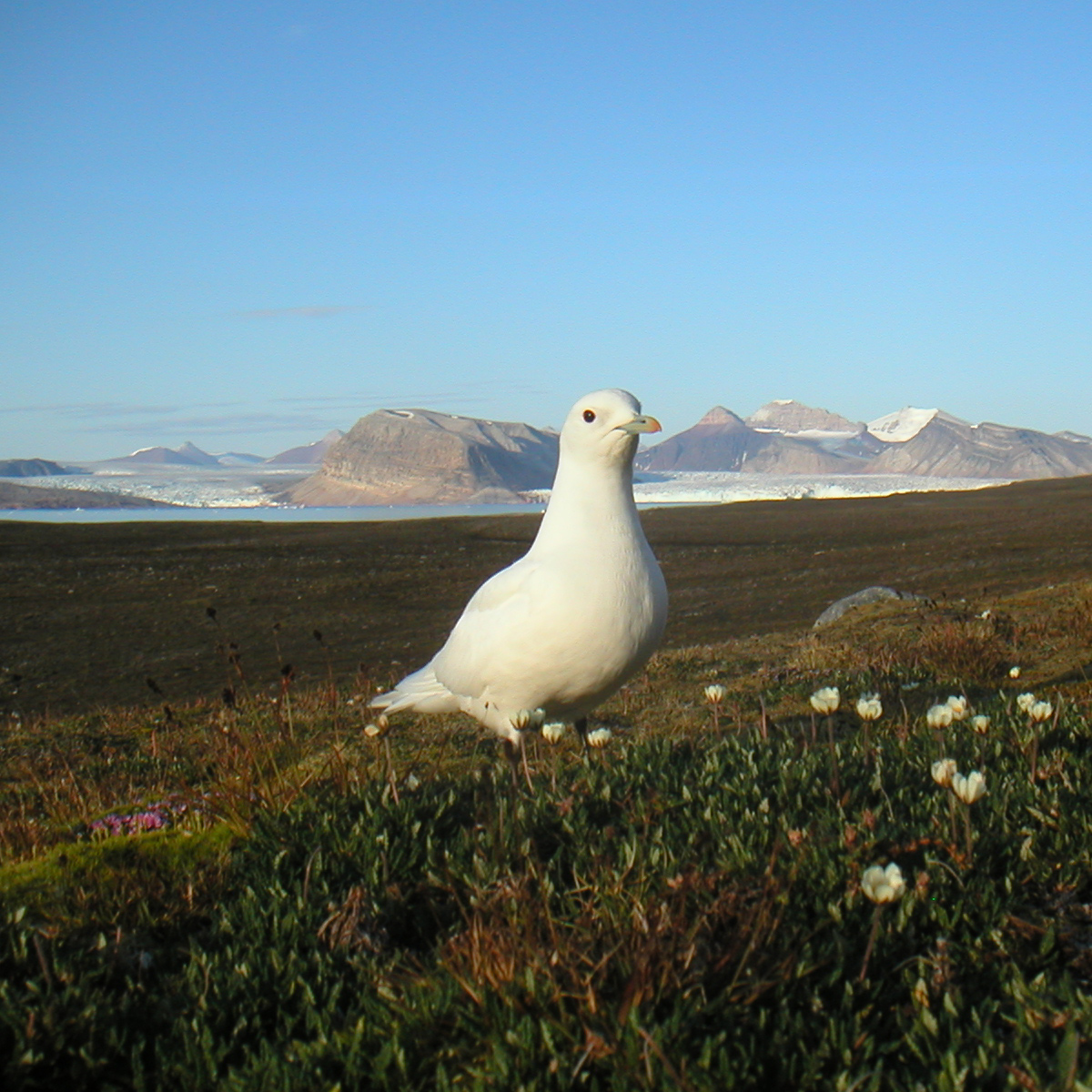
- Ivory gull in Svalbard

Conservation status
- Near Threatened (IUCN 3.1)

Scientific classification
- Kingdom: Animalia
- Phylum: Chordata
- Class: Aves
- Order: Charadriiformes
- Family: Laridae
- Genus: Pagophila; Kaup, 1829
- Species: P. eburnea

Binomial name
- Pagophila eburnea (Phipps, 1774)

Synonyms
- Larus eburneus Phipps, 1774; Pagophila alba Gunnerus

= Ivory gull =

Species of bird

The ivory gull (Pagophila eburnea) is a small gull, the only species in the genus Pagophila. It is a resident breeding bird in the high Arctic and has a circumpolar distribution through Greenland, northernmost North America, and Eurasia.

== Taxonomy ==
The ivory gull was initially described by Constantine Phipps, 2nd Baron Mulgrave in 1774 as Larus eburneus from a specimen collected on Spitsbergen during his 1773 expedition towards the North Pole. Johann Jakob Kaup later noted the unique traits of the ivory gull and gave it a monotypic genus Pagophila in 1829. Johan Ernst Gunnerus later gave the species a new specific name, Pagophila alba. The genus name Pagophila is from Ancient Greek pagos, "sea-ice", and philos, "-loving", and specific eburnea is Latin for "ivory-coloured", from ebur, "ivory". Today only a few authors consider the ivory gull not deserving of its monotypic genus, instead choosing to merge it, along with the other monotypic gulls, back into Larus. However, most authors have not chosen to do so. The ivory gull has no subspecies. No fossil members of this genus are known.

This gull has traditionally been believed to be most closely related to either the kittiwakes, Sabine's gull, or Ross's gull. It differs anatomically from the other genera by having a relatively short tarsometatarsus, a narrower os pubis, and potentially more flexibility in skull kinetic structure. Structurally, it is most similar to the kittiwakes; however, recent genetic analysis based on mtDNA sequences shows that Sabine's gull is the ivory gull's closest relative, followed by the kittiwakes, with Ross's gull, little gull, and swallow-tailed gull sharing a clade with this group. Pagophila is maintained as a unique genus because of the bird's morphological, behavioural and ecological differences from these species.

Colloquial names from Newfoundland include slob gull (from "slob", a local name for drift ice) and ice partridge, from a vague resemblance to a ptarmigan.

== Description ==
The ivory gull is 40–43 cm (16–17 in) long, with a wingspan of 108–120 cm (43–47 in); males weigh between 500–687 g (17.6–24.2 oz) and females between 448–583 g (15.8–20.6 oz).

This species is easy to identify. It has a different, more pigeon-like shape compared to the Larus gulls, an impression reinforced by its short legs. The adult has completely pure white plumage, lacking the grey back of other gulls. The thick bill is blue with a yellow tip (occasionally with a reddish tip), and the legs are black. The eyes are dark, with a narrow dark red orbital ring. Juvenile and first-winter birds have a dusky face and variable amounts of black flecking in the wings and tail; they take two years to attain full adult plumage, with second-winter yearlings having an intermediate plumage with smaller dark spots and a less dusky face, though some second-winters resemble adults. In flight, it has long, broad-based wings, with a strong wingbeat reminiscent of skuas. Its flight call cry is a harsh, tern-like keeeer. It has many other calls, including a warbling "fox-call" that indicates potential predators such as an arctic fox, polar bear, glaucous gull, or human near a nest; a "long-call" given with wrists out, elongated neck and downward-pointed bill, given in elaborate display to other ivory gulls during breeding, and a plaintive begging call given in courtship by females to males, accompanied by head-tossing. There are no differences in appearance across the species' geographic range.

== Distribution and habitat ==
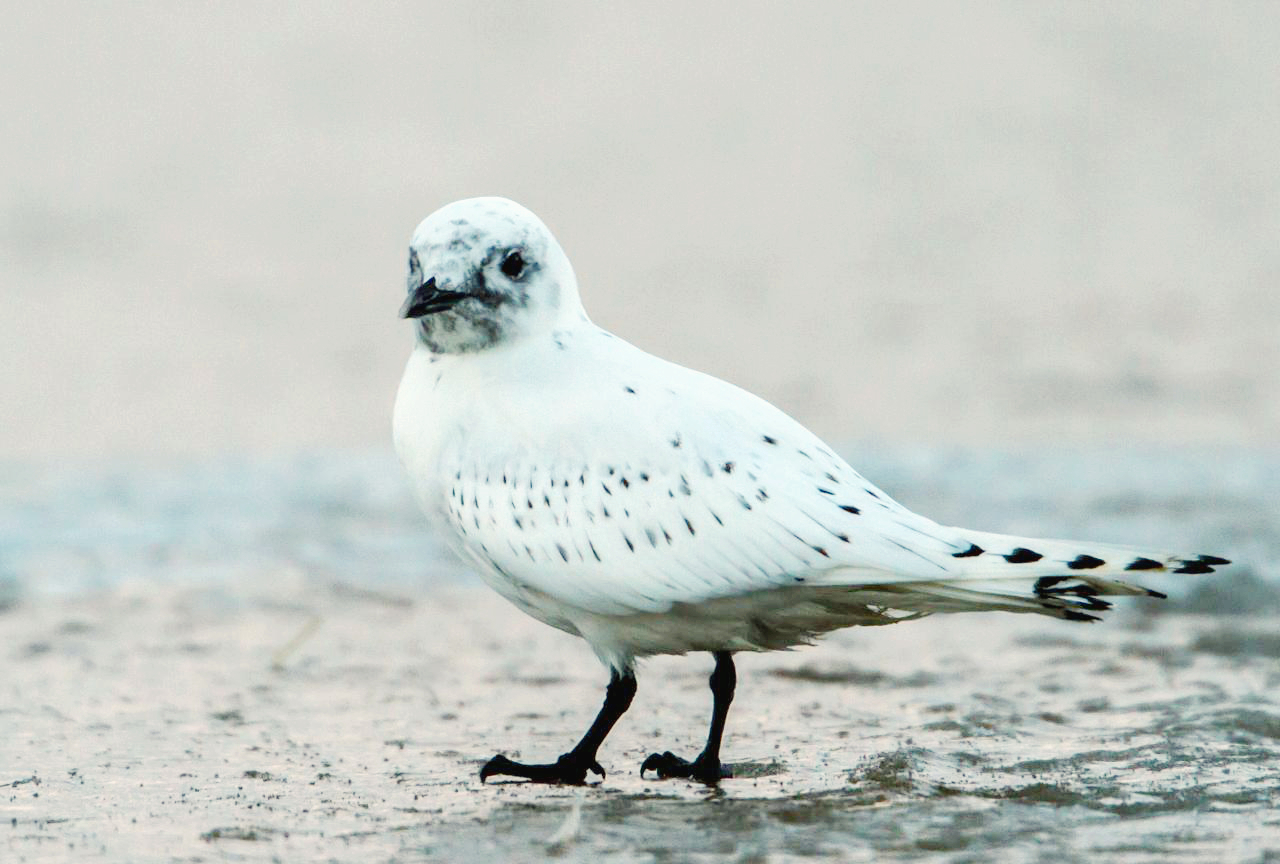
First-winter plumage

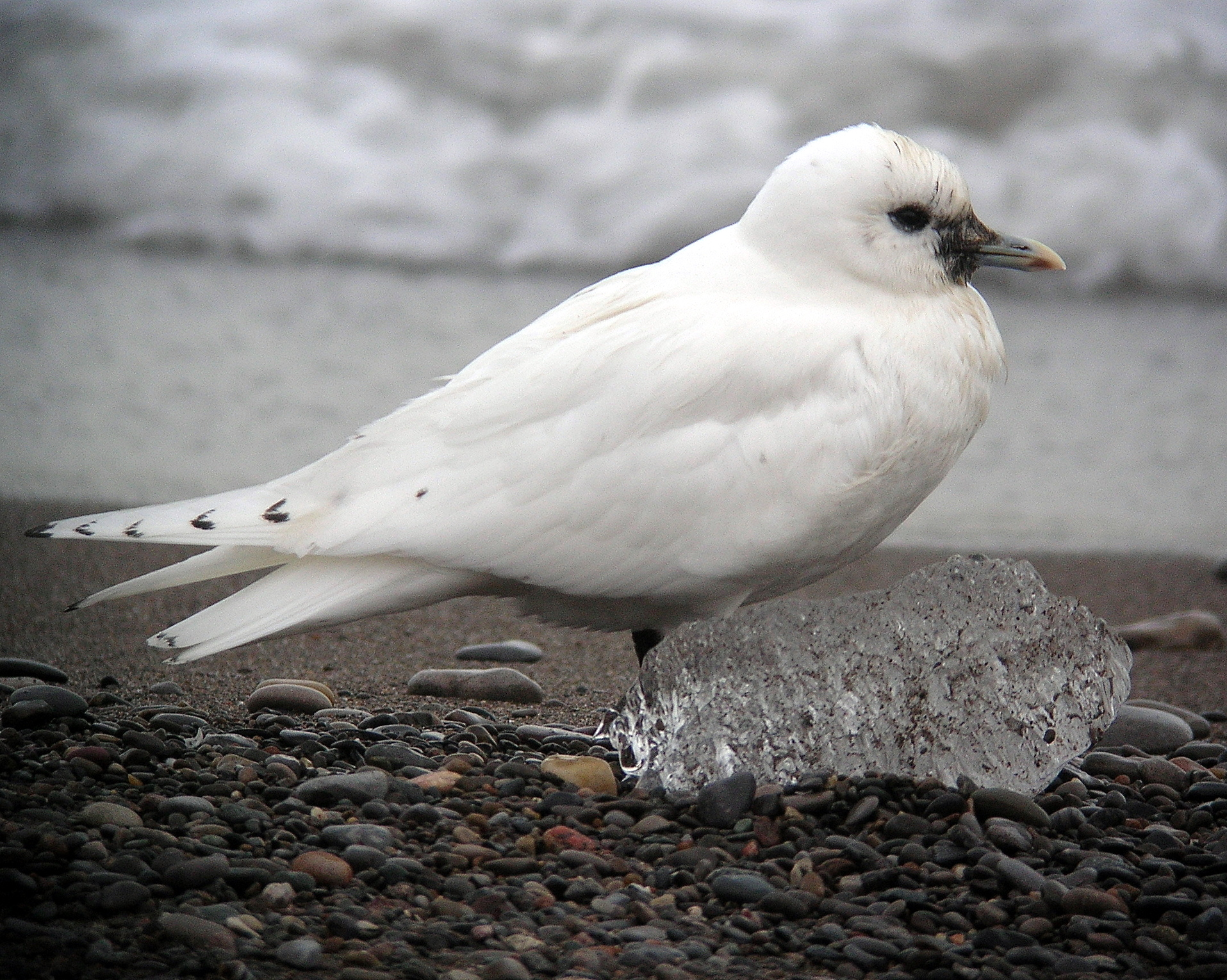
Second-winter plumage

In Europe and Asia, it breeds on Svalbard, and the island archipelagos north of Russia. In North America, it only breeds in the Canadian Arctic. Seymour Island, Nunavut is home to the largest known breeding colony, while Ellesmere, Devon, Cornwallis, and north Baffin islands are known locations of breeding colonies. It is believed that there are other small breeding colonies of less than six birds that are still undiscovered. There are no records of the ivory gull breeding in Alaska.

During the winter, ivory gulls live near polynyas, or a large area of open water surrounded by sea ice. North American birds, along with some from Greenland and Europe, winter along the 2000 km of ice edge stretching between 50° and 64° N from the Labrador Sea to Davis Strait that is bordered by Labrador and southwestern Greenland. Wintering gulls are often seen on the eastern coasts of Newfoundland and Labrador and occasionally appear on the north shore of the Gulf of St. Lawrence and the interior of Labrador. It also winters from October through June in the Bering Sea and Chukchi Sea. It is most widespread throughout the polynyas and pack ice of the Bering Sea. It is also vagrant throughout coastal Canada and the northeastern United States, though records of individuals as far south as California and Georgia have been reported, as well as the British Isles, with most records from late November through early March. Juveniles tend to wander further from the Arctic than adults.

== Ecology and behaviour ==
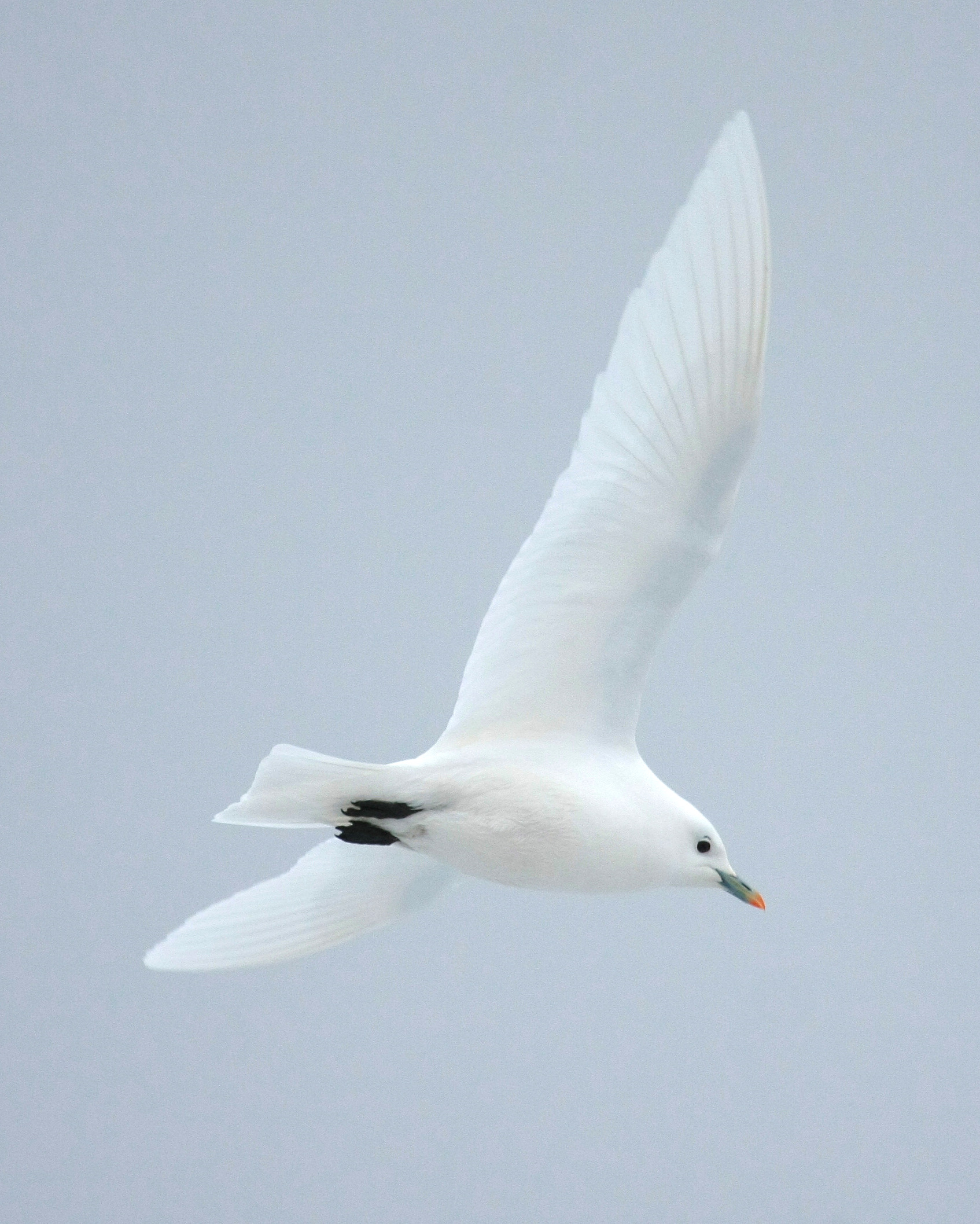
Adult in flight

Ivory gulls migrate only short distances south in autumn, most of the population wintering in northern latitudes at the edge of the pack ice, although some birds reach more temperate areas. In the arctic winter, ivory gulls are often reluctant to land on water, due to the risk of water droplets freezing onto their plumage.

=== Diet ===
It takes fish and crustaceans, eggs and small chicks but is also an opportunist scavenger, often found on seal or porpoise corpses. It frequently follows polar bears and other predators to feed on the remains of their kills, and also eats polar bear and seal faeces, and seal placentae.

=== Reproduction ===
The ivory gull breeds on Arctic coasts and cliffs, laying one to three olive eggs in a ground nest lined with moss, lichens, or seaweed. It breeds in summer, laying eggs in late June or early July, with the chicks fledging in August. Most colonies are small, with 5–60 pairs, rarely over 100 pairs. Some colonies have been found breeding on gravel-covered floating ice floes off Greenland.

== Status ==
In 2012 the total population of ivory gulls was estimated to be between 19,000 and 27,000 individuals. The majority of these were in Russia with 2,500–10,000 along the Arctic coastline, 4,000 on the Severnaya Zemlya archipelago and 8,000 on Franz Josef Land and Victoria Island. There were also estimated to be around 4,000 individuals in Greenland and in the years 2002–03, 500–700 were recorded in Canada. Examination of data collected on an icebreaker plying between Greenland and Svalbard between 1988 and 2014, by Claude Joiris of the Royal Belgian Institute of Natural Sciences, found a sevenfold fall in ivory gull numbers after 2007. The species is declining rapidly in Canada, while in other parts of its range its population is poorly known. The Canadian population in the early 2000s were approximately 80% lower than in the 1980s.

Illegal hunting may be one of the causes of the decline in the Canadian population, but the main cause of the species' global decline is the decline in sea ice due to human-induced global warming. Ivory gulls breed near to sea ice and the loss of ice makes it difficult for them to find enough food to feed their chicks. There is a high risk that the ivory gull could become the first vertebrate to become extinct due to human-induced global warming.

The species is classified by the International Union for Conservation of Nature as "Near Threatened".

== Literary appearances ==
An ivory gull is the inspiration for the eponymous carving in Holling C. Holling's classic Newbery Medal-winning children's book, Seabird.
