= Laura Bannon =

American writer and artist

Laura Bannon (1894–1963) was an American teacher and artist, illustrator and author of children's literature.

Laura Bannon was born on July 2, 1894, in Acme, Michigan, the daughter of James William Bannon and Carrie Freeman Bannon. She received degrees from Michigan State Normal School (now Eastern Michigan University) and the School of the Art Institute of Chicago. She taught high school in Battle Creek, Michigan for two years, and later became director of the Chicago Art Institute's junior department.

Bannon received the Chicago Children's Reading Round Table Award for her career contributions to children's literature. She also received acclaim from the Society of Typographical Arts.

Bannon died on December 14, 1963.

== Partial bibliography ==
- Manuela's Birthday (1936)
- Tales from a Finnish Tupa (1936) (illustrator)
- Pecos Bill: The Greatest Cowboy of All Time (1937) (illustrator)
- Gregorio and the White Llama (1941)
- Patty Paints a Picture (1946)
- The Wonderful Fashion Doll (1953)
