= The Road from Home =

1979 non-fiction book by David Kherdian

- First US edition
- Author: David Kherdian
- Language: English
- Subject: Armenian genocide
- Genre: Non-fiction
- Publisher: Greenwillow Books (US); Julia MacRae (UK)
- Publication date: 1979
- Pages: 242
- ISBN: 978-0688144258

The Road from Home: A True Story of Courage, Survival, and Hope, earlier titled The Road from Home: The Story of an Armenian Girl, is a non-fiction book written by David Kherdian, originally published in 1979. It is based on the life of the author's mother, Veron Dumehjian (1907-1981), who survived the Armenian genocide. During the deportations, the rest of her immediate family died. She returned to her native town, only to be displaced again by the Greco-Turkish War (1919–22). After settling in Smyrna, she was forced to flee once more due to the Great Fire of Smyrna. Veron escaped to ultimately settle in the United States. The book is widely read by middle school children throughout the U.S. and has been published throughout Europe. It has received a number of prestigious awards.

== Synopsis ==
For as long as I knew the sky and the clouds, we lived in our white stucco house in the Armenian quarter of Azizya, in Turkey, but when the great dome of Heaven cracked and shattered over our lives, and we were abandoned by the sun and blown like scattered seed across the Arabian desert, none returned but me, and my Azizya, my precious home, was made to crumble and fall and forever disappear from my life.

— The first paragraph of The Road From Home

The book begins with the early life of Veron Dumehjian (1907-1981) in her native city of Azizya (today Emirdağ) in the province of Eskişehir. She was born into a wealthy Armenian family and had a comfortable and secure life. When the Armenian genocide began in 1915, eight-year-old Veron along with her family were forcefully removed from their homes and deported. During the deportations, Veron's entire immediate family, including her father, mother, brothers, and sisters died either from diseases contracted along the way or due to exhaustion. Now an orphan at the age of eleven, Veron managed to survive in the Syrian desert with the help of distant relatives. When her relatives did not treat her as their own, she chose to be placed in an orphanage and remained there until she was twelve years old. She then returned to her native town of Azizya and lived with her grandmother.

The Greco-Turkish War reached her village and Veron was gravely wounded. After recovering, she moved to the seaside town of Smyrna to live with her aunt. She was forced to flee once more due to the Great Fire of Smyrna, when Greek and Armenian refugees were crammed into the waterfront of the city and forced into the sea. Veron and her aunt were rescued by a boat and taken to Greece. There, Veron married an Armenian-American, Melkon Kherdian. She ultimately moved to the United States and settled in Wisconsin.

== Methodology ==
The Road from Home is based on the first-person accounts of David Kherdian's mother Veron. Upon the request of her son, Veron Dumehjian had written an eleven-page transcript of her memories in Armenian. Kherdian recorded Veron's account as she read it out loud. Upon recounting the part where her mother died, Veron began to cry and had difficulty continuing. It was the first time Kherdian had seen his mother cry. Nevertheless, Veron managed to complete the story and the book was published in 1979. Although the book is based on true events, parts of the dialogue were created by the author.

== Reception and awards ==
The Road from Home is Kherdian's most famous book. Its success has increased awareness of the Armenian Genocide. The book has been published in most European countries and in many other places, including Japan. It has been republished several times in the United States and is increasingly read in middle schools throughout the country.

The Road from Home has received numerous awards and recognitions including:

- Boston Globe–Horn Book Award (1979)
- Lewis Carroll Shelf Award (1979)
- National Book Award for Young People's Literature Finalist (1980)
- Newbery Honor Book (1980)
- Jane Addams Children's Book Award (1980)
- Banta Award (1980)
- American Book Award finalist (1980)

== See also ==
- Witnesses and testimonies of the Armenian genocide
