= Ed Emberley =

American artist and illustrator (born 1931)

Edward Randolph Emberley
- Born: October 19, 1931; Malden, Massachusetts
- Education: Massachusetts School of Art, Rhode Island School of Design
- Known for: "how to draw" books
- Notable work: Drummer Hoff
- Spouse: Barbara
- Children: 2

Edward Randolph Emberley (born October 19, 1931) is an American artist and illustrator, best known for children's picture books.

== Biography ==
Edward Randolph Emberley was born in Malden, Massachusetts on October 19, 1931. He studied art at the Massachusetts School of Art in Boston (now the Massachusetts College of Art and Design), from which he received a Bachelor of Fine Arts degree in painting and illustration. He also studied at the Rhode Island School of Design.

Emberley married Barbara (née Collins), a librarian and writer, in 1955; they have two children, Rebecca and Michael. Michael is also an illustrator. They lived in Ipswich, Massachusetts most of their lives and now live in assisted living in Newburyport. Rebecca is also a children's books author and illustrator.

== Career ==
Emberley is best known for his children's book work - particularly instructional drawing books. Emberley believes that everyone can learn to draw. His drawing books for children feature clear step-by-step instructions employing numbers, letters, and shapes graded to the early elementary school level. For example, the book Ed Emberley's A.B.C. uses this style of instruction, presenting a single letter-based drawing for each letter of the alphabet.

Emberley has illustrated or contributed to over 50 books, many of which were first published between the 1960s and 1980s. Renewed interest in Emberley's work has come from adults who first encountered his books as children and now are purchasing them for their own children. His most recent book, The Red Hen, was released on October 26, 2010; like his preceding work, Chicken Little (2009), it is a collaboration with Rebecca Emberley.

== Awards and honors ==
Emberley's first book, The Wing on a Flea (1961), was an ALA Notable Book and made the New York Times list of best-illustrated books for that year. He was sole runner-up for the 1967 Caldecott Medal, as illustrator of One Wide River to Cross, written by his wife Barbara Emberley. Next year he won the Medal for another collaboration with Barbara, Drummer Hoff. The award by children's librarians annually recognizes "the most distinguished American picture book for children". Drummer Hoff was also named to the Lewis Carroll Shelf Award list.

== Selected works ==
- A Birthday Wish 1977
- Bits and Bytes: A Computer Dictionary for Beginners 1985 (illustrator)
- Bye-Bye, Big Bad Bullybug 2007
- Chicken Little 2009 (illustrator)
- Clothing 1969 (illustrator)
- Columbus Day (illustrator)
- Drummer Hoff 1968 (illustrator)
- Ed Emberley's 6 Nature Adventures 1982
- Ed Emberley's ABC 1978
- Ed Emberley's Big Green Drawing Book c1979
- Ed Emberley's Big Orange Drawing Book c1980
- Ed Emberley's Big Purple Drawing Book c1981
- Ed Emberley's Big Red Drawing Book c1987
- Ed Emberley's Christmas Drawing Book c1987
- Ed Emberley's Crazy Mixed-Up Face Game c1981
- Ed Emberley's Drawing Book: Make a World 1972
- Ed Emberley's Drawing Book of Animals 1970
- Ed Emberley's Drawing Book of Faces 1975
- Ed Emberley's Drawing Book of Trucks and Trains 2002
- Ed Emberley's Fingerprint Drawing Book 2001
- Ed Emberley's Great Thumbprint Drawing Book c1977
- Ed Emberley's Jumbo Book of Drawing Activities
- Ed Emberley's Little Book of Drawing Farms
- Ed Emberley's Little Drawing Book of Trains 1973
- Ed Emberley's Little Drawing Book of Weirdos 1973
- Ed Emberley's Picture Pie 1984
- Ed Emberley's Second Drawing Box
- Ed Emberley's Three Science Flip Books
- Flash, Crash, Rumble and Roll 1985 (illustrator)
- First Words: Cars, Boats and Planes
- First Words: Sounds
- Glad Monster, Sad Monster 1997 (illustrator)
- Go Away, Big Green Monster 1993
- Green Says Go
- How to Talk to Your Computer (illustrator)
- If You're a Monster and You Know It... 2010 (illustrator)
- Kid-Friendly Computer Book (illustrator)
- Kid-Friendly Computer Start-Ups (illustrator)
- Klippity Klop
- Krispin's Fair 1976 (illustrator)
- Ladybug, Ladybug, Fly Away Home 1967 (illustrator)
- Meet the Computer (illustrator)
- Moon Seems to Change (illustrator)
- One Wide River to Cross 1967
- The Parade Book 1962
- Simon's Song (illustrator)
- Squiggles, Dots and Lines
- Straight Hair, Curly Hair (illustrator)
- Suppose You Met a Witch 1973 (illustrator)
- Thanks Mom
- The Ant and the Grasshopper (illustrator)
- The BASIC Book (illustrator)
- The Big Dipper 1962 (illustrator)
- The Bottom of the Sea 1966 (illustrator)
- The Fisherman and his Wife unfinished (illustrator)
- The Gallant Tailor unfinished (adaptor and illustrator)
- The Lion and the Mice (illustrator)
- The Red Hen 2010
- The Story of Paul Bunyan 1963 (illustrator)
- The Wing on a Flea 1961
- The Wizard of Op 1975
- There Was an Old Lady unfinished (illustrator)
- There Was an Old Monster! 2009 (illustrator)
- Three: An Emberley Family Sketchbook 1998
- Turtle Talk (illustrator)
- Where's My Sweetie Pie? 2010
- Yankee Doodle (illustrator)
- Rosebud 1966
- The Crocodile and the Scorpion
- Spare Parts (illustrator)
