= An Edge of the Forest =

1959 novel by Agnes Clifford Smith

- An Edge of the Forest, Published by Viking, 1959
- Author: Agnes Clifford Smith
- Language: English
- Publisher: Viking Press
- Publication date: 1959
- OCLC: 1401921
- LC Class: PZ4.S642 An

An Edge of the Forest is a 1959 novel by American writer Agnes Clifford Smith (1906–1994), first published by Viking Press. It won the 1961 Aurianne Award of the American Library Association, along with several other awards.

== Plot summary, style ==
The book describes how a lamb enters a forest after becoming separated from its flock. Here it is befriended by a leapordess, and soon its innocence begins to influence the various animals of the forest. Eventually it is reunited with its shepherd.

The author dedicated the book to "saints, philosophers, and artists".

It has been described as an allegory, an intricate fantasy, with a poetic style, “reminiscent by turns of medieval beast fables, of Isaiah's vision of the time when "the wolf also shall dwell with the lamb" and of the Parable of the Good Shepherd.”

== Reception ==
A review in the The Women's News Journal called it "one of the special books that will be remembered for a lifetime and can be read at any age…it is far too important a book to be lost”. Ellen Lewis Buell of The New York Times criticised the novel as over long and "abstruse".

== Awards ==
- New York Herald Tribune Children's Book Award
- 1961 Aurianne Award of the American Library Association
- 1966 Lewis Carroll Shelf Award of the Wisconsin Book Conference
