= Total Package Procurement =

1960s US DoD acquisition policy

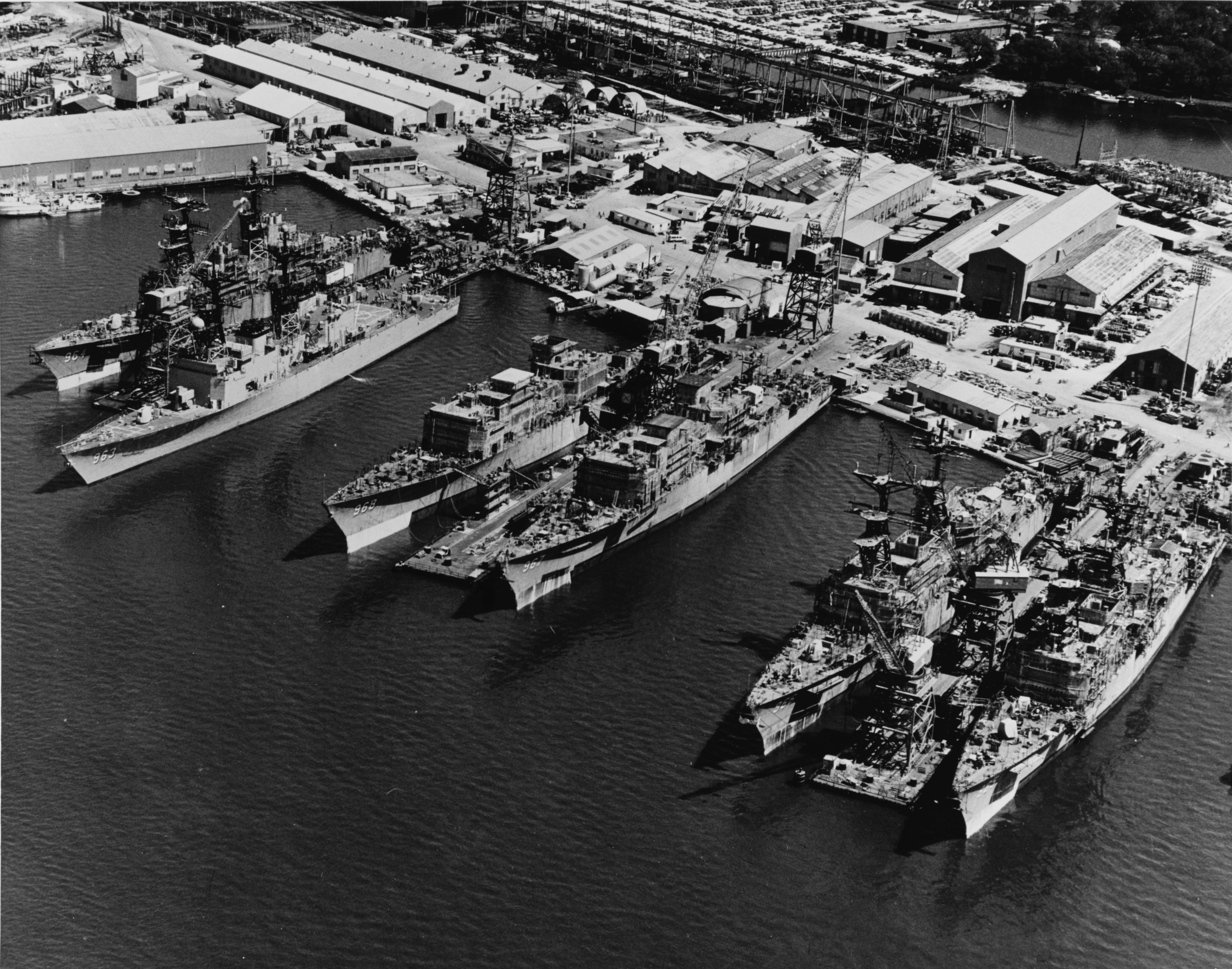
Six Spruance-class destroyers fitting out in 1975; this class of warships was ordered under the Total Package Procurement policy

Total Package Procurement (TPP or alternatively TPPC) was a major systems acquisition policy introduced in the United States Department of Defense in the mid-1960s by Secretary of Defense Robert MacNamara. It was conceived by Assistant Secretary of Defense for Installations and Logistics, Robert H. Charles.

TPP involves combining as a single package for the procurement a number of related requirements including the design, development, production and support of major systems. This concept was a "pendulum reaction" to the prior cost reimbursement policies in major weapon systems.

Total Package Procurement was not successful and was abandoned shortly after MacNamara left office.

== Description ==
TPP is a method of procuring at the outset of the acquisition phase under a single contract containing price, performance and schedule commitments, the maximum practical amount of design, development, production and support needed to introduce and sustain a system or component in the inventory.

The purpose of TPP was to procure under the influence of competition as much of the total design, development, production and support requirements for a system or component as may be practicable thereby:

- Providing firmer 5-year force structure program package planning information concerning performance cost and schedules.
- Discouraging contractors from buying in on the design and development effort with the intention of recovering on the subsequent production program.
- Permitting program decision and source selection based on binding performance price and schedule commitments by contractors for the total program or major part of it.
- Providing a firmer basis for projecting total acquisition and operational costs for use in source selection and in the determination of appropriate contractual incentives.
- Motivating contractors to design initially for economical production and support of operational hardware which may not receive sufficient emphasis in the absence of productions commitments.
- Requiring contractors to assume more responsibility for program success thereby permitting the Government to monitor programs more in terms of surveillance and less in terms of detailed management.

== Results ==
Total Package Procurement did not succeed. The unique complexity of shipbuilding made Total Package Procurement particularly inappropriate for these programs.

Notable programs that encountered major problems with the TPP approach were the Air Force's Lockheed C-5 Galaxy and AGM-69 SRAM, the Army's Lockheed AH-56 Cheyenne, the Tarawa-class amphibious assault ships (LHA), and the Spruance-class destroyers.

== Elimination ==
Upon taking office as Deputy Secretary of Defense in 1970, David Packard issued a May 28, 1970 memorandum that contained a number of major reforms designed to address "the real mess we have on our hands." A key reform was elimination of TPP except in rare situations.
