= Shirley Glubok =

American historian and author

- Born: Shirley Glubok; 15 June 1933; St. Louis, Missouri, United States
- Died: January 2017 (aged 83); United States
- Occupations: Author, historian
- Known for: Authoring several books

Academic background
- Education: Columbia University
- Website: www.macdowell.org/artists/shirley-glubok

Shirley Glubok (15 June 1933 – January 2017) was an American historian of the art of ancient societies and cultures.

== Biography ==
She was born on June 15, 1933, in St. Louis, Missouri. She was married to Alfred Tamarin, whom she later divorced.

She died in January 2017.

== Education ==
She received her bachelor's degree from Washington University, majoring in art and archeology. She obtained her master's degree in early childhood education from Columbia University in 1958.

== Career ==
Her first book, The Art of Ancient Egypt was published by Atheneum Press in 1962.

== Awards and honours ==
She has received the Lewis Carroll Shelf Award in 1962 for her book The Art of Ancient Egypt. She has also received the Spur Award from the Western Writers of America in 1971.

== Bibliography ==
She is the author of a number of notable books:

- Art and Archaeology
- The Art of the Eskimo
- The Art of the Northwest Coast Indians
- Christian Monasticism From the Fourth to the Ninth Centuries of the Christian Era
- The Art of Ancient Greece
- Olympic Games in Ancient Greece
