= Paddle to the Sea =

- Directed by: Bill Mason
- Screenplay by: Bill Mason
- Based on: Paddle-to-the-Sea by Holling C. Holling
- Produced by: Julian Biggs
- Starring: Kyle Apatagen
- Narrated by: Stanley Jackson
- Cinematography: Bill Mason
- Music by: Louis Applebaum
- Production company: National Film Board of Canada
- Distributed by: National Film Board of Canada
- Release date: 1966
- Running time: 27 min 59 s
- Country: Canada
- Language: English
- Budget: $70,913

Paddle to the Sea (French: Vogue-à-la-mer) is a 1966 National Film Board of Canada short live-action film directed, shot and edited by Bill Mason. It is based on the 1941 children's book Paddle-to-the-Sea by American author and illustrator Holling C. Holling, and follows the adventures of a child's hand-carved toy Indian in a canoe as it makes its way from Lake Superior to the Gulf of Saint Lawrence, through Canada's waterways. It was nominated for an Academy Award for Best Live Action Short Film at the 40th Academy Awards.

== Production ==
While the story begins near Lake Nipigon, the launch scene was shot in Gatineau Park. Other shooting locations included a staged forest fire at Meech Lake, with Mason torching spruce trees that he had installed along the shoreline, and the local fire department on standby. Mason and colleague Blake James did not ask for permission to climb over the safety fence to film the sequence of the little boat going over the Horseshoe Falls: they rappeled down to the water's edge, with James casting the boat into the water and Mason filming. The filmmaker taught himself to carve in order to make the boats, which had to be replaced when they drifted off at sea—or were lost over Niagara Falls.

== Differences from book ==
The film differs from the children's book in its inclusion of the problem of water pollution. While Holling's 1941 book focuses only on the geography and commercial importance of the Great Lakes and Saint Lawrence River, Mason's film includes a sequence where the tiny boat must endure polluted waters, shot on Lake Superior near Marathon, Ontario.

== Awards ==
- Yorkton Film Festival, Yorkton, Saskatchewan: First Place, Creative Arts and Experimental Films, 1967
- Salerno Film Festival, Salerno, Italy: First Prize, Information Films, 1967
- American Film and Video Festival, New York: Blue Ribbon, Stories for Children, 1967
- International Educational Film Festival, Tehran, Iran: Golden Delfan, First Prize, Educational Films for Children, 1967
- La Plata International Children's Film Festival, La Plata: Silver Plaque, 1968
- Film Critics and Journalists Association of Ceylon, Colombo, Sri Lanka: Certificate of Merit, 1969
- International Festival of Short Films, Philadelphia: Award for Exceptional Merit, 1971
- Educational Film Library Association of America, New York - Sightlines Magazine list of 10 Best Films of the Last Ten Years, 1968
- International Film & Television Festival of New York: Silver Medal, Education, Language Arts, 1987
- 40th Academy Awards, Los Angeles: Nominee: Best Live Action Short Film, 1968

== Post-release notes ==
To attend the Academy Awards in Los Angeles, Mason drove down from Canada with a canoe on his car roof, stopping at rivers along the way. Today, the Canadian Museum of History has one of Mason's hand-carved canoe replicas; his family has several more.

Season 1, Episode 1 (The Loop) of Tales from the Loop television series has the characters watching Paddle to the Sea at 30:15.

== Works cited ==
- Evans, Gary (1991). In the National Interest: A Chronicle of the National Film Board of Canada from 1949 to 1989. University of Toronto Press. ISBN 0802027849.
