= Pauline Clarke =

English children's writer (1921–2013)

- Born: Anne Pauline Clarke; 19 May 1921; Kirkby-in-Ashfield, Nottinghamshire, England
- Died: 23 July 2013 (aged 92)
- Other names: Helen Clare; Pauline Hunter Blair
- Education: Somerville College, Oxford
- Occupation: Author
- Notable work: The Twelve and the Genii

Pauline Clarke (19 May 1921 – 23 July 2013) was an English author who wrote for younger children under the name Helen Clare, for older children as Pauline Clarke, and later for adults under her married name Pauline Hunter Blair. Her best-known work is The Twelve and the Genii, a low fantasy children's novel published by Faber in 1962, for which she won the 1962 Carnegie Medal, the Lewis Carroll Shelf Award, and the 1968 Deutscher Jugendliteraturpreis.

== Biography ==
Anne Pauline Clarke was born in Kirkby-in-Ashfield in Nottinghamshire in 1921 and later lived in Bottisham, Cambridgeshire. She was educated at schools in London and Colchester before entering Somerville College, Oxford in 1940 to read English. After leaving Oxford in 1943, she worked as a journalist and wrote for children's magazines. Between 1948 and 1972 she wrote books for children.

Clarke married the historian Peter Hunter Blair in 1969. She edited his history Anglo-Saxon Northumbria (1984).

Clarke donated 19 prints by Cecil Leslie, who illustrated Clarke's work The Pekinese Princess, to the British Museum.

She died on 23 July 2013 at the age of 92.

== Works ==
=== Children's literature ===
Clarke wrote many types of children's book including fantasies, family comedies, historical novels and poetry.

==== The Pekinese Princess ====
The Pekinese Princess (1948), Clarke's first book, is a long-ago fantasy of talking animals and trees in a fairy tale Chinese setting, a human-like world without humans. The text also makes reference to the Buddha. The fantasy ends with an apotheosis of immortality. The "merciful Jade Emperor ... picked up the kingdom by the four corners of the plain, as in a blanket, and planted it whole upon the mountain in the middle of the world, where the immortals dwell" (p 125). The story acts as a fable for how Pekinese remain on earth: "But some few Pekinese slipped out from the corners when the Lord of Heaven lifted the kingdom, and landed upon the earth again. These are they you see sometimes looking mournful ... for they are thinking with longing of their happy kingdom" (p 127).

==== Smith's Hoard ====
Smith's Hoard (1955), also known as The Golden Collar, is a British school-holiday mystery story. A brother and sister are sent for the school holidays to their great-aunt who lives in the country. During their train trip they coincidentally meet a boastful young man who tells them he is a dealer in second-hand jewellery, and shows them a strange gold item. The children work to untangle a mystery which includes secret and illegal archaeological digging, theft of historical artefacts, and even the haunting by the ghost of the Celtic smith who buried the hoard and died in tribal warfare. The story is narrated by the younger sister (with some help from her brother and his friend), and, by the end, the mystery is solved.

==== Torolv the Fatherless ====
The story of Torolv the Fatherless (1959) works around the Old English poem The Battle of Maldon. This commemorates a bitter defeat at Maldon in Essex by Danish raiders in 991, led by a Viking called Anlaf, who is possibly Olaf Tryggvason, later the king of Norway, and himself a character in the Icelandic Heimskringla Saga. At the end of the book, Clarke includes her translation of the poem.

==== The Boy With the Erpingham Hood ====
Clarke's The Boy With the Erpingham Hood (1956), contemporaneous with Cynthia Harnett's historical novels of the same historical era (Plantagenet England in the early Fifteenth century), is the story of Simon Forester, a fictitious boy, involved with real characters and events leading to the Battle of Agincourt in 1415.

Keep the Pot Boiling (1961) is about a contemporary vicar's family. Their efforts to amuse themselves constructively resemble the family novels of her contemporaries Rumer Godden and Noel Streatfeild. The vicar suffers from what we would now call bipolar disorder.

==== The Twelve and the Genii ====
Clarke achieved her greatest success with The Twelve and the Genii, published by Faber in 1962. She won the annual Carnegie Medal from the Library Association, recognising The Twelve as the year's best children's book by a British subject, and the German Kinderbuchpreis. It was published in the U.S. by Coward-McCann as The Return of the Twelve and so named to the Lewis Carroll Shelf Award list in 1963. These books, like many of her others, were originally illustrated by Cecil Leslie.

==== The Two Faces of Silenus ====
Clarke's last children's novel The Two Faces of Silenus (1972) is a fantasy in which mythology from the past errupts into a modern realistic setting. Visiting Italy with their parents, while their father attends a historians' conference, Rufus and Drusilla set free the ancient god-satyr Silenus, and his enemy Medusa.

=== Adult literature ===
==== The Nelson Boy ====
Clarke wrote for adults as Pauline Hunter Blair. The first book published was The Nelson Boy (1999), a painstakingly-researched historical reconstruction of Horatio Nelson's childhood. She followed with a sequel about his early voyages.

==== Warscape ====
Warscape (2002), was written when Pauline Hunter Blair was in her late 70s. The novel explores the points of view of British civilians during the World War II, beginning on All Saints Day, 1 November 1943. Clarke had been 22 in 1943. The novel chronicles the major events of the war, from October 1943 through to the first Christmas of the hard-won peace, in December 1945. The main story follows Laura Cardew, a young woman recently graduated from Oxford University, and now recruited into the secret world of wartime Intelligence. She soon finds herself as part of the office-based Intelligence team analysing the multitude of reports from secret agents and Resistance workers and spies in Europe, warning of the dangers of the anticipated German revenge weapon, the V1 “buzz bomb” or “doodlebug”.

Writing as a septuagenarian, Hunter Blair is open in her writing about love and sex from the perspective of young, university-trained women and men, of the 1940s. Frequently, and diversely, the characters quote, mention, or allude to a wide range of authors, literature, music, history, and culture, including Dickens, Tolstoy, Mozart, Bach, Ibsen, Shakespeare, Tennyson, Freud, Plato, Jung, Locke, Bunyan, Lewis Carroll, Dylan Thomas, Sassoon, Coleridge. Many famous and popular people of that era are mentioned, including John Pudney, Laurence Olivier, Ralph Richardson, Myra Hess (pianist), C.E.M. Joad (famous on the radio show Brains Trust), C.S. Lewis (when his wartime writing and radio talks on Christianity were popular, but before he became a best-seller children's fantasy author), Benjamin Britten and Peter Pears, the “Punch” cartoonist and patriotic war-poster artist Fougasse. A large shared cultivated culture informs the ideas and lives of Hunter Blair's characters.

==== Jacob's Ladder ====
Written in her early 80s, and self-published, with minor typos and editorial slips, Jacob’s Ladder (2003) is a novel of village life, with a cast of mainly middle-aged people experiencing their approach to old-age, final illnesses, the death of partners, and the struggle to make sense of life and rebuild human contact and love. The story includes one murder, one suicide, two deaths, two remarriages and one marriage, and continual reflections on being human, while also being aware of DNA, black holes, mental illness (depression and paranoid schizophrenia), sexuality and sexual expression and love, and creativity. The novel is threaded through with quotations and references to Egyptian mythology, notably Thoth, the ibis-headed god of knowledge, truth and justice, as well as the Metaphysical poet Thomas Traherne, and the Renaissance renegade monk Giordano Bruno, and the Hermetic writings, along with many other literary, musical, and artistic motifs. Religious belief and mysticism, agnosticism, and atheism are important issues.

One of the characters is a would-be novelist, and their sketch for a new work close the novel: "After the ravages of death, life flowed in. … As the sea flows in at high tide, and absconds again, screeching down the shingle, stealing away with generations of sins" (Jacob's Ladder, p. 344).

== Bibliography ==
=== As Helen Clare ===
- Dolls series, illustrated by Cecil Leslie
  - Five Dolls in a House (1953)
  - Five Dolls and the Monkey (1956)
  - Five Dolls in the Snow (1957)
  - Five Dolls and Their Friends (1959)
  - Five Dolls and the Duke (1963)
- Merlin's Magic (1953)
- Bel the Giant and Other Stories (1956), illus. Peggy Fortnum; reissued as The Cat and the Fiddle and Other Stories (1968), illus. Ida Pellei
- Seven White Pebbles (1960), illus. Cynthia Abbott

=== As Pauline Clarke ===
- The Pekinese Princess (1948)
- The Great Can (1952)
- The White Elephant (1952)
- Smith's Hoard (1955) also published as Hidden Gold (1957) and as The Golden Collar (1967)
- Sandy the Sailor (1956)
- The Boy with the Erpingham Hood (1956)
- James the Policeman (1957)
- James and the Robbers (1959)
- Torolv the Fatherless (1959)
- The Lord of the Castle (1960)
- The Robin Hooders (1960)
- Keep the Pot Boiling (1961)
- James and the Smugglers (1961)
- Silver Bells and Cockle Shells (1962)
- The Twelve and the Genii (1962), illus. Cecil Leslie; U.S. title, The Return of the Twelves
- James and the Black Van (1963)
- Crowds of Creatures (1964)
- The Bonfire Party (1966)
- The Two Faces of Silenus (1972)

=== As Pauline Hunter Blair ===
- Anglo-Saxon Northumbria, Variorum by Peter Hunter Blair (editor, with Michael Lapidge) (1984)
- The Nelson Boy: An Imaginative Reconstruction of a Great Man's Childhood (1999)
- A Thorough Seaman: The Ships' Logs of Horatio Nelson's Early Voyages Imaginatively Explored (2000)
- Warscape (2002)
- Jacob's Ladder (Church Farmhouse Books, Bottisham, 2003)
