= I Am David (film) =

- Theatrical release poster
- Directed by: Paul Feig
- Screenplay by: Paul Feig
- Based on: I Am David by Anne Holm
- Produced by: Davina Belling; Lauren Levine; Clive Parsons
- Starring: Ben Tibber; Jim Caviezel; Joan Plowright
- Cinematography: Roman Osin
- Edited by: Steven Weisberg
- Music by: Stewart Copeland
- Production companies: Walden Media; Film and General
- Distributed by: Lions Gate Films (North America); Summit Entertainment (International)
- Release dates: May 15, 2003 (Cannes); December 3, 2004 (United States)
- Running time: 90 minutes
- Country: United States
- Language: English
- Budget: $7 million
- Box office: $292,376

I Am David is a 2003 American historical drama film written and directed by Paul Feig in his directorial debut. It is based on the 1963 novel of the same name (originally published in the USA under the name North to Freedom) by Anne Holm. The film was produced by Walden Media and Lions Gate Entertainment.

== Plot ==
Note: The story is mostly fictional with few true historical events. While forced labor camps existed in communist Bulgaria during the Cold War, David's story is entirely fictional.

In 1951, a 12 year old boy named David, who is most likely Jewish and the child of parents who were political prisoners, escapes from a forced labor camp in the communist People's Republic of Bulgaria where he lived for most of his time. He was alone in the camp, after his mother was taken away from him, until he befriended a prisoner in the camp named Johannes. Johannes, his friend and mentor in the camp, who is most likely a German Nazi prisoner of war himself, prepares David to escape from the labor camp and tells David to go on an important mission and leave Bulgaria and travel all the way to Denmark to deliver a letter for an unknown person, but is murdered by a guard in the labor camp, forcing David to escape on his own. David is helped by a surprisingly kind and caring guard of the labor camp, whom he tells of his mission to go to Denmark. The guard then gives him a compass and tells him he must cross the border and enter Greece and then go southwest to Thessaloniki, board a ship to arrive in Italy, and ultimately go north from there to Denmark. When night comes, David escapes from the labor camp through a hole in the barbed wire fence and then sets out on his extremely dangerous journey to Denmark, initially continuing to falsely believe he is on that important mission to deliver the letter.

Gradually he learns that some people can be trusted, and to open up and experience his own feelings. Finally, with the help of a woman named Sophia who lives in Switzerland, David is reunited with his mother in Denmark, and there he learns the true "mission" was to reunite him with his mother.

== Cast ==
- Ben Tibber as David
- Jim Caviezel as Johannes
- Joan Plowright as Sophie
- Hristo Shopov as Lieutenant in a concentration camp
- Roberto Attias as Baker
- Maria Bonnevie as David's mother
- Francesco De Vito as Roberto
- Viola Carinci as Maria
- Silvia De Santis as Elsa
- Alessandro Sperduti as Carlo

== Reception ==
On the review aggregator website Rotten Tomatoes, 39% of 33 critics' reviews are positive, with an average rating of 5.2/10. The website's consensus reads: "I Am David smothers its heartwarming story in narrative contrivances that ultimately render suspension of disbelief - or enjoyment - all but impossible." Metacritic, which uses a weighted average, assigned the film a score of 47 out of 100, based on nine critics, indicating "mixed or average" reviews.

Roger Ebert of the Chicago Sun-Times wrote: "I couldn't believe a moment of it, and never identified with little David."

The film grossed $288,552 domestically in 226 theaters. Worldwide, it grossed $3,824., making it a major box-office failure.

== Awards ==
The film won several awards in 2003, including the Crystal Heart Award in the Heartland Film Festival, the Queens Festival's Best Feature Film prize, and Best Film and Most Promising Actor for Ben Tibber. Ben Tibber never acted in a feature film again.
