= Seabird (novel) =

1948 novel by Holling Clancy Holling

- First edition
- Author: Holling Clancy Holling
- Language: English
- Genre: Children's novel
- Publication date: 1948
- Publication place: United States
- Media type: Print (Paperback)
- Pages: 64

Trading with an Eskimo for tusks

Seabird is a 1948 book for children and young people, written and illustrated by Holling Clancy Holling.

== Plot ==
Ezra, the ship's boy on an 1850s whaling ship, uses his off duty time and walrus tusks traded from an Eskimo to carve an ivory gull, which later serves as the family mascot. The book follows the history of the gull over the next 80 years as it passes from one of Ezra's descendants to another, while simultaneously tracing the history of commercial transportation, from Clipper ships to jet airplanes.

== Description ==
Each odd numbered page has a picture of an aspect of life at sea. The facing even numbered pages carry the text with wide margins filled with labeled drawings of details of history or natural history, such as how oil was taken from a whale that was too big to bring on board, and how the shape of a ship's bow depends on its intended use.

== Reception ==
First published in 1948, Seabird was a Newbery Honor recipient in 1949.
