= Slake's Limbo =

1974 novel by Felice Holman

- First edition cover
- Author: Felice Holman
- Language: English
- Genre: Young adult
- Publisher: Atheneum Books
- Publication date: September 1, 1974
- Publication place: United States
- Media type: Print
- ISBN: 0-684-13926-X

Slake's Limbo is a novel for young adults by Felice Holman, first published in 1974. The book is about a young adolescent boy, Aremis Slake, who runs away from home to live in the New York City Subway tunnels of the IRT Lexington Avenue Line and stays for 121 days. The novel has received several honors, including a Lewis Carroll Shelf Award best book for young adults citation, an ALA Notable Book citation in 1978, and a Horn Book Fanfare Best Book Award in 1975.

The story was later adapted into a 1989 television film titled Runaway starring Jasmine Guy.

== Plot ==
Aremis Slake lives in a room underground in the subway station Grand Central – 42nd Street. It soon becomes the home he has never known. He collects used newspapers off passing trains and makes a living selling them. He has two regular customers: the cleaning lady, and a man with a turban. A major theme throughout the book is Slake's low self-esteem and lack of experiences with empathy, which are dealt with throughout the course of the book.

With the money that he gets from doing this, he buys food from the local diner, and soon becomes a regular customer. The people at the luncheonette see him there every day and have sympathy for this homeless boy. They offer him a sweeping job and pay him with food sufficient to meet his needs.

There are also occasionally sections of the book entitled "On Another Track", about the parallel life of a man named Willis Joe Whinny.

Willis Joe is a middle-class motor man who also has an internal dilemma. He conducts trains with the depressing mindset that people are like sheep, lacking the empathy essential for psychological health.

At the climax of the book, Willis Joe meets Slake and their paths coincide due to a railway accident that was thought to have been caused by holes in the subway walls. Terrified, Slake scrambles on the subway track because he has pneumonia and needs help, because his home was doomed to be sealed up due to repairs needed in the subway. He scrambles onto the track with a sign that says STOP and Willis Joe saves him, stopping the train with a determination he had not experienced for years.

When Slake awakes in a hospital, he decides to flee for the rooftops. He sees his symbolic bird fly away, ending a miserable period in his life and signifying depression. He then departs with renewed hopes and purposes.
