= Cecil Mary Leslie =

British painter

- Born: 1900; London, England
- Died: 1980 (aged 79–80)
- Known for: Painting, Engraving, Illustration

Cecil Mary Leslie (1900–1980) was an engraver, portrait painter, sculptor and illustrator.

== Biography ==
Leslie was born in London and studied at the Heatherley School of Fine Art in 1919 and then at the London School of Photolithography and Engraving and the Central School of Arts and Crafts. She taught at the Grosvenor School of Modern Art.

From 1923 until 1939 Leslie exhibited works at the Royal Academy in London, with the Society of Women Artists, the Royal Glasgow Institute of the Fine Arts, the Walker Art Gallery in Liverpool, the New English Art Club, the Royal Society of British Artists, the Royal Cambrian Academy of Art and at the Royal Scottish Academy. Leslie also exhibited in the United States, France, Czechoslovakia, the Netherlands, Australia and New Zealand. Her home was in Blakeney, Norfolk.

Cecil Leslie illustrated the Puffin editions of the classic Heidi (1956) and E. Nesbit's The Story of the Treasure Seekers (1958), The Wouldbegoods (1958) and The Enchanted Castle (1964). She also illustrated many of Pauline Clarke's books, including the Carnegie Medal winner, The Twelve and the Genii, and several other children's books by Rose Fyleman and Alison Uttley, among others.
