= Glen Rounds =

American author and illustrator

- Born: April 4, 1906; Wall, South Dakota, U.S.
- Died: September 27, 2002 (aged 96); Pinehurst, North Carolina, U.S.
- Education: Kansas City Art Institute; Art Students League of New York
- Occupations: Writer and illustrator
- Spouses: Janet Barber; Margaret Olmsted; Elizabeth High
- Children: William
- Writing career
- Language: English
- Period: 1936–1999
- Genre: Children's literature
- Notable work: Ol' Paul, the Mighty Logger
- Notable awards: Lewis Carroll Shelf Award (1958, 1960, 1969, 1973, 1976, 1978); Kerlan Award for children's literature (1980); North Carolina Award for children's literature (1980)
- Website: glenrounds.info

Glen Harold Rounds (April 4, 1906 – September 27, 2002) was an American writer and illustrator. In a career that exceeded six decades, he wrote and illustrated well over 100 books. He was the recipient of more than 25 literary awards.

== Early life ==
Rounds was born in a sod house near Wall, South Dakota, in 1906, in a region known as the South Dakota Badlands. When he was a year old, he and his family traveled in a covered wagon to Montana, where he grew up on a ranch. During his youth, he worked at many odd jobs, including baker, cook, sign painter, sawmill worker, cowboy, mule skinner, logger, ranch hand, and carnival medicine man.

== Training as an artist ==
Rounds took an interest in art from a young age, making frequent sketches of characters and scenes from his daily life. He pursued formal training in painting and drawing at the Kansas City Art Institute from 1926 to 1927, and at the Art Students League of New York from 1930 to 1931. During this formative period, he spent a summer touring the Western United States together with Jackson Pollock, a fellow art student, and Thomas Hart Benton, their teacher at the Art Students League. Rounds and Pollock both served as models for Benton's painting The Ballad of the Jealous Lover of Lone Green Valley, 1933–1934.

Rounds spent much of the early 1930s visiting publishers in New York City in an attempt to convince editors to give him work as an illustrator. Vernon Ives, who worked at Holiday House, the publisher that would eventually publish Rounds' first book, later remarked that his initial impression of Rounds was of "a young, footloose westerner with a discerning eye, a quick, sketchy style of drawing that had enormous vitality, and a tongue even more facile than his brush."

== Career as a writer and illustrator ==
Through these persistent efforts to win the attention of publishers, Rounds unintentionally developed a reputation as a gifted storyteller, to the extent that editors eventually advised him to create an artistic opportunity for himself by writing a story collection that he could also illustrate. The result was Ol' Paul, the Mighty Logger (1936), an anthology of Paul Bunyan stories that Rounds later admitted he had largely invented. The book appeared to rave reviews: Kirkus Reviews praised the "virility of the [book's] line illustrations" and its "homespun look", summing it up as "a book to read aloud". After the success of Ol' Paul, the Mighty Logger, Rounds had a steady stream of work, both as a writer and illustrator of his own books and as an illustrator for the work of others, for the rest of his life.

Rounds published a wide variety of fiction and non-fiction, all of it written for an audience of children and young adults. In The Blind Colt (1941), he introduced the character of Whitey, a young Montana cowboy, who would eventually appear in eleven books published from 1941 to 1963. Another semi-autobiographical character, Mr. Yowder, the itinerant sign painter, would be featured in six books published in the 1970s and 1980s. Many of Rounds' other works focus on his attentive eye for the natural world, including several books that deal with the wildlife and environment of the Great Plains (where he had spent his youth) or of North Carolina (where he settled after the Second World War).

Clues to the appeal of Rounds storytelling were given by Pat Parker in Language Arts magazine: "Rounds draws children, women, men and the ever-present dogs surrounded by space, suggesting frugality and human frailty in a land of awesome size; at the same time he adds subtle, sly, comic touches for real-life atmosphere."

Late in his career, Rounds struggled with arthritic pain in his right arm. In 1989 this condition had grown too severe for him to continue illustrating, so at the age of 83, Rounds taught himself to draw with his left hand, and resumed his work as an illustrator. Reviewers continued to praise both his writing and his artistry: his last book, Beavers (1999), was praised by a Horn Book reviewer as "a model of how to convey a wealth of information in just a few clear, well-phrased sentences," and his illustrations were compared to the patient work of a beaver building a dam, seeming "aimless when taken stick by stick or line by line, but wonderfully effective in sum".

== Awards and honors ==
Rounds was the recipient of over 25 awards for writing and illustrating. His first book, Ol' Paul, the Mighty Logger, was in the inaugural class of Lewis Carroll Shelf Award winners in 1958, and other titles by Rounds received the award again in 1960, 1969, 1973, 1976, and 1978. Rounds received the Kerlan Award for children's literature in 1980, and the North Carolina Award for literature in 1981. He was also the recipient of the Parents' Choice Award and The New York Times Outstanding Book Award.

The North Carolina Literary Hall of Fame inducted him as an honoree in 2002, the year of his death, calling Rounds "the last of the great 'Ring-Tailed Roarers'".

== Personal life ==
Rounds served in the United States Army from 1941 to 1945 in the coast artillery and infantry, attaining the rank of staff sergeant.

Rounds married three times. He married his first wife, Mary Lucas, in December 1927; they divorced in 1937. He married his second wife, Margaret Olmsted, in January 1938; they remained married until her death in December 1968. He married his third wife, Elizabeth High, in 1989; she died in June 2002.

Rounds died on September 27, 2002, in Pinehurst, North Carolina, at the age of 96. He was survived by one son, William, and two granddaughters.

== Selected bibliography ==
=== Award-winning and nominated fiction ===
- Ol' Paul, the Mighty Logger, Holiday House (1936)
- The Blind Colt, Holiday House (1941)
- Whitey's First Round-up. Grosset. 1942.
- Wild Horses of the Red Desert. Holiday House. 1969.
- The Day the Circus Came to Lone Tree (1973)
- Mr. Yowder and the Lion Roar Capsules (1976)
- Mr. Yowder and the Giant Bull Snake, Holiday House (1978)
- Wild Appaloosa, Holiday House (1983)
- The Morning the Sun Refused to Rise: An Original Paul Bunyan Tale (1984)
- Washday on Noah's Ark: A Story of Noah's Ark, Holiday House (1985)

=== Award-winning and nominated non-fiction ===
- Beaver Business: An Almanac (1960)
- Rain in the Woods and Other Small Matters. World Publishing Company. 1964.
- The Snake Tree (1966)
