= Reflections on a Gift of Watermelon Pickle... and other Modern Verse =

- Editors: Stephen Dunning, Edward Lueders, Hugh Smith
- Language: English
- Published: 1966 (Scott Foresman)
- Publication place: United States
- Pages: 160 (first edition)
- Awards: Lewis Carroll Shelf Award (1968)
- ISBN: 0-673-03363-5
- OCLC: 270432
- Dewey Decimal: 811.508
- LC Class: PS614.D8

Reflections on a Gift of Watermelon Pickle... and other Modern Verse is a Lewis Carroll Shelf Award-winning anthology of poetry edited by Stephen Dunning, Edward Lueders and Hugh Smith. Compiled in an effort to present modern poetry in a way that would appeal to the young, Watermelon Pickle was long a standard in high school curricula, and has been described as a classic.

The anthology consists of 114 poems, including ones by Ezra Pound, Edna St. Vincent Millay and e. e. cummings, but also ones by lesser-known poets. It is particularly noted for "espous[ing] no specific morality, no politesse, and no didacticism", as well as for giving a relatively modern presentation with photographs and modern typefaces. This presentation was in stark contrast to the practices of textbook publishers of the 1960s, which seemingly "cramm[ed] as many problems onto a page as possible".

In 1969, Watermelon Pickle was described by one commentator as having "become one of the more popular high school literature materials". Another commentator in 1999 called it "[t]he most widely used anthology for young adults ever and still in print". A 2002 article describes Watermelon Pickle as "establish[ing] a long-overdue niche" for young adult poetry.

The book is titled after the last poem, "Reflections on a Gift of Watermelon Pickle Received from a Friend called Felicity" by John Tobias.
