= The World Museum =

American comic strip by Holling Clancy Holling

The World Museum Dioramas
- The World Museum Diorama of 16 May 1937: Treasure Hunters of the Sea
- Author: Holling Clancy Holling
- Illustrator: Holling Clancy Holling
- Current status/schedule: Discontinued
- Launch date: May 9, 1937
- End date: January 30, 1938

The World Museum was a full-page illustrated feature in some American Sunday newspapers, starting on May 9, 1937 until January 30, 1938. Devised and drawn by Holling Clancy Holling (1900–1973), it was also known as The World Museum Dioramas.

The Evening Star in Washington and the Baltimore American both published the dioramas. Publication in the Evening Star abruptly stops in February 1938 in spite of the next diorama, Log Cabin Days (scheduled for February 6, 1938) being announced in the January 30, 1938 issue along with Roman Gladiators. No announcement of the cancellation seems to have been done.

== Format ==
Each diorama was published in the Sunday edition and occupied a full page in color. It featured all the parts to be cut out by the reader with detailed instructions to cut out the pictures and assemble them into a diorama using wrapping paper to stiffen the structure. Each new diorama had a paragraph explaining the diorama itself from a historical or geographical point of view. Subject included historical events, natural wonders or international ethnographic scenes.

== List of Dioramas ==
These are the dioramas published from May 1937 to January 1938 the Washington, D.C. Evening Star. The names are the titles as published in the newspapers. Names in [ ] are clarification comments for titles that are not clear.

May 1937:

- The Coronation of King George the Sixth and Queen Elizabeth
- Treasure Hunters of the Sea
- Castles in Spain
- Dragons that Walked on the Water [Viking Ship]

June 1937:

- The Creeping Wall [Glacier]
- The Indian Buffalo Hunters
- The Working Elephant
- Making a Motion Picture

July 1937:

- When the Liberty Bell Rang
- When Dinosaurs Roamed the Earth
- Life in a Dutch Village
- Tibetan Devil Dancers

August 1937:

- China Clipper [A Small Plane]
- Fulton's First Steamboat
- Whale Hunting
- African Waterhole

September 1937:

- An Indian School
- Perry's Victory [War of 1812]
- Polish Village Festival
- Balboa at the Pacific

October 1937:

- The Ohio Mound Builders [Native Americans]
- Discovery of America [Christopher Columbus]
- Dancing Scotch Villagers
- Interior of a Coal Mine
- Indian False Faces [Native American Masks]

November 1937:

- The Pool of Death [A prehistoric tar pool in California]
- A Lacrosse Game
- First Thanksgiving
- The Grand Canyon

December 1937:

- Eskimo Life
- Lion Spearing
- Mexican Christmas
- The Three Wise Men

January 1938:

- Chinese New Year
- First Bullfights
- Siamese Temple
- Roman Gladiators
- American Desert

February 1938:

- Log Cabin Days (Announced but unpublished)
