= Annuzza, a Girl of Romania =

1961 novel by Hertha Seuberlich

- Author: Hertha Seuberlich
- Original title: Annuzza im Maisfeld
- Translator: Stella Humphries
- Illustrator: Gerhard Pallasch
- Language: German
- Genre: Children's novel
- Published: 1961 (Enslinn und Laiblin Verlag, Reutlingen) (German); 1962 (Rand McNally & Company) (English)
- Publication place: Germany

Annuzza, a Girl of Romania (German: Annuzza im Maisfeld Eine Mädchenerzählung aus Rumänien, lit. 'Annuzza in the Maize-field: A Girl's Story from Romania'; also published as Candle in the Wind), by Hertha Seuberlich, is a 1961 children's novel about a Romanian peasant girl who wins a scholarship and struggles to find her footing in the town. The novel was well-reviewed when it was translated and received the Lewis Carroll Shelf Award in 1963 for books of the quality of Alice's Adventures in Wonderland by Lewis Carroll.

== Publication ==
Annuzza im Maisfeld was originally published in German in 1961 by Enslinn and Laiblin, Verlag, Reutlingen. It was translated into English by Stella Humphries, with illustrations by Gerhard Pallasch, and published by Rand McNally & Company in 1962. It is also known as Candle in the Wind.

== Plot ==
Twelve-year-old peasant girl Annuzza Burda lives with her family in a small village in Romania, at the foot of the Carpathian Mountains. The family is composed of her father, who drinks too much; her mother, who seeks to keep the peace; her severe grandmother Bunika; her supportive older sister Kuza; and her mocking younger brother Puiu. The family makes a living from growing maize in their fields.

One day when Annuzza is supposed to be looking after the hens, a buzzard attacks and kills the best laying hen. Instead of joining the other villagers at the harvest celebration, Annuzza is banished to the mountain pastures for a few days with the reclusive shepherd Drago, who warns her about life in the town.

Annuzza is an excellent student, and her teacher asks her to write an essay titled 'My Dreams'. She wins a scholarship to the nearby town to attend a girls' school. Her father and grandmother do not believe she needs an education, while her mother and sister support her.

Annuzza goes to the school but finds it difficult to make friends, as the other girls are very different. She meets an affluent student called Nadine, a ballet dancer, and they become good friends. Nadine assumes that Annuzza is also wealthy, and Annuzza does not want to lose the friendship so she pretends she is from a large estate in the countryside. Whenever Annuzza's mother comes to visit, after attending the market, Annuzza is embarrassed and does not want the other students to know that her mother is a peasant.

Nadine introduces Annuzza to her handsome cousin Nelo, a young officer. Annuzza continues the deception about her origins. They become close, but when Nelo asks to visit her country estate, Annuzza knows she must tell them the truth. She writes down her story and gives it to Nadine and Nelo.

At Easter, Annuzza makes a wish with her Easter candle that Nadine and Nelo will forgive her, but her candle blows out in the wind, leading her to believe that they will not forgive her. When she returns to the town, their friendship ebbs away.

Back home, Annuzza confesses to the priest what she has done. He confers with the teacher and they ask her to stay in the village to teach in the new nursery school. Her family is overjoyed, and her father vows to stop drinking. Her village sweetheart, Marcel, is glad she has come back. Annuzza realizes that she belongs in the village.

== Reception ==
Annuzza, a Girl of Romania, was well-reviewed upon publication. The New York Times described the novel as "memorable" and "remarkable in nearly every way." It praised its "well-knit" plot, "broad and believable" characterizations, luxuriant detail, and the author's deep perception.

Kirkus Reviews called it "a strenuous but effective tale of a Romanian peasant girl and her painful struggle for learning and a life beyond the maize fields." The review described the novel as "meaty emotional fare for the middle teen" with local details that ring true.

Outside in World (an organization that promotes children's fiction in translation to English from around the world) described the novel as "extraordinary", and said it "explores the feelings of a teenage girl facing obstacles from her family and the struggles she encounters as she attempts to fulfil her dreams". The novel also offered insights into Romanian ways of life, celebrations and customs.

The teaching manual On Story Wings described the novel as: "A forthright story of a girl who surrenders her chance for an education and returns to her village to help her impoverished family". It was listed among books about "boys and girls from many parts of the world [who] display courage in their actions and attitudes".

In 1963, the book received the Lewis Carroll Shelf Award, a literary award conferred annually between 1958 and 1979. Award-winning books were deemed "of sufficient quality to sit on the same bookshelf" as Alice's Adventures in Wonderland by Lewis Carroll. A team of editors, librarians, teachers, parents and writers voted on the award for books which would "appeal to children 50 or even 100 years from now."
