= Pecos Bill: The Greatest Cowboy of All Time =

1937 children's by James Cloyd Bowman

- Title page for Pecos Bill: The Greatest Cowboy of All Time
- Author: James Cloyd Bowman
- Illustrator: Laura Bannon
- Language: English
- Genre: Children's literature
- Publisher: Whitman
- Publication date: 1937
- Publication place: United States

Pecos Bill: The Greatest Cowboy of All Time is a 1937 children's biography of American folk hero Pecos Bill written by James Cloyd Bowman and illustrated by Laura Bannon. Bill, raised by coyotes, has various supernatural powers, including the ability to talk to animals, and becomes a spectacularly successful cowboy.

== Reception ==
The novel was a Newbery Honor recipient in 1938, losing out to Kate Seredy's The White Stag by one vote., New York Herald Tribune Honor book, and a Junior Library Guild selection. Kirkus Reviews called the book "fun reading".
