= Ol' Paul, the Mighty Logger =

Anthology of Paul Bunyan tales

First edition

Ol' Paul, the Mighty Logger is an anthology of ten original Paul Bunyan tall tales: it was written and illustrated by Glen Rounds, and published by Holiday House in 1936. Upon its publication, Kirkus Reviews praised it, saying that "there's a harmony about this book -- the telling of familiar episodes from the Paul Bunyan legend, the homespun look of the paper, the virility of the line illustrations. . . . [A] book to read aloud." It was one of the seventeen books selected in the inaugural class of Lewis Carroll Shelf Award recipients in 1958.
