= I Am David =

Book by Anne Holm

I am David / North to Freedom (US title)
- First UK edition
- Author: Anne Holm
- Original title: Jeg er David
- Translator: L. W. Kingsland
- Language: Danish
- Genre: Children's, historical novel
- Publisher: Gyldendal; Methuen (UK)
- Publication date: 1963
- Publication place: Denmark
- English publication date: 1965
- Media type: Print (hardback and paperback)
- Pages: 191
- ISBN: 0-15-205161-9 (first English edition, hardback)
- OCLC: 54006814
- LC Class: PZ7.H7322 Iae 2004

I am David is a 1963 novel by Anne Holm. It tells the story of a young boy who, with the help of a prison guard, escapes from a concentration camp in an unnamed Eastern European country and journeys to Denmark. Along the way, he meets many people who teach him about life outside the concentration camp.

The book, originally written in Danish, has been translated into several languages, including Norwegian, Swedish, Finnish, and German (all 1963), Dutch (1964), English (1965), Afrikaans (1982), and French (1986), and Konkani (1987). In the United States, the book was first called North to Freedom and "On the road to America", but it is now also being published as I am David. It was made into a film in 2003.

== Plot ==
Twelve-year-old David has lived in a concentration camp for as long as he can remember.

David was a strong, brave, and intelligent boy who had been ripped away from his mother and put into a dreadful camp. His only friend in the camp, Johannes, died, as is revealed in a flashback in Chapter 1.

One of the commandants has been keeping an eye on David, making sure he is fed properly and taking his vitamins. This guard sets up the escape, gives him some soap, and leaves a sack outside the camp fence with bread, a bottle of water, and a compass in it. David must go south to Salonika, find a boat to Italy, then travel north to Denmark.

David finds a truck heading for Salonika, and without realizing it, climbs on board. He eats some of the food inside and when the truck stops, he jumps out. He finds a boat labelled "Italy" and sneaks in. After hiding for a few days and getting quite drunk from drinking wine, he is found. Thankfully, the Italian sailor decides to help David escape by lowering him down the side of the ship with a lifebelt on. He floats to land and, after climbing a distance, promptly falls asleep.

After having a bath, David finds a cave to spend the day in. Then he decides to go to the town nearby to learn about life outside of a prison camp. He is given, much to his surprise, a loaf of bread. He also finds a piece of newspaper that he uses to practice reading with. Later, after visiting the town every day for a while, David uses the excuse that he works for a circus to explain why he is a polyglot and why he is traveling. Then he overhears local people talking about him. He flees the town and travels north. On his way, he helps people, and sometimes they give him money. Along his journey, David discovers the beauty of the world and slowly changes his behaviour and how he interacts with people.

David accidentally sets foot on someone’s property, and a boy called Carlo beats him up. He saves a girl called Maria from a fire in a shed where she was trapped. David spends some time in Maria's family's house, where he sees a globe and learns about different countries. However, his knowledge of suffering and death, as well as his enmity with their eldest son and his deepening, overtly exclusive relationship with Maria worries the parents. David overhears them talking about him and, after writing them a letter, leaves the house to travel north again. Sometime later he sees a personal advertisement in a newspaper placed by Maria's family, offering him a home and saying they understand his decision to leave.

David has also been praying to the "God of green pastures and still waters" Then David enters a church and then meets a priest who tells him there is only one God.

When he meets Sophie, a middle-aged lady who lives in Switzerland and likes to paint as a hobby, she asks David if she can paint him; later she invites David to have lunch with her in her house, and while he is there, David sees a picture of a woman in Denmark. Sophie tells him that the woman's husband and her child, a boy named David, were killed, but that a guard who was attracted to the woman allowed her to escape. He realizes he needs to travel to Denmark and find that woman, who is his mother. He also realizes that the guard who became the commandant has saved him because he was in love with David's mother. However, because she did not love him back, and the commandant felt a need for revenge, he did not tell her that David was still alive.

When winter hits, David travels through the mountains, and he is held prisoner by a farmer who uses him for work. It is a hard season, but he is grateful to shelter at night in the farmer's stable until the snow melts. The farmer's dog, King, keeps him company through the winter. David knows that as the snow melts, he must escape from the bolted stable, as the farmer will soon hand him to the police. He makes a hole in the stable, digs a tunnel, and is free again. King catches up with him. Later, the dog gives his life to distract some guards in East Germany so that David can cross the border. David travels on through Denmark to Copenhagen where he looks up his mother's address in a telephone book. At the end of his strength, he travels to the house and knocks on the door, introducing himself to his mother, recognising her from the picture he saw of her in Switzerland. His mother instantly recognizes him as her son David and embraces him.

== Awards ==
- Lewis Carroll Shelf Award
- American Library Association Notable Book
- Best Scandinavian Children's Book
- Boys Club of America Junior Book Award Gold Medal

== Release details ==
- David, [København] Gyldendal, 1963
- I am David, Orlando, Fla. : Harcourt, 2004, ISBN 0-15-205161-9 (hc), ISBN 0-15-205160-0 (pbk)
- The Best Scandinavian Children's Book awarded in 1995
