= Holling C. Holling =

American author and illustrator

Holling Clancy Holling (born Holling Allison Clancy, August 2, 1900 – September 7, 1973) was an American writer and illustrator, best known for the book Paddle-to-the-Sea, which was a Caldecott Honor Book in 1942. Paddle to the Sea won the Lewis Carroll Shelf Award in 1962. In 1966, Bill Mason directed the Oscar-nominated short film Paddle to the Sea, based on Holling's book, for the National Film Board of Canada.

== Life and career ==
Born in Jackson County, Michigan, Holling graduated from the Art Institute of Chicago in 1923. A number of his early works were first published by P. F. Volland & Co. He worked in a taxidermy department of the Field Museum of Natural History in Chicago and spent time working in anthropology under Dr. Ralph Linton.

During this period, he married Lucille Webster and within a year of their marriage accepted a position as art instructor on the first University World Cruise, sponsored by New York University. For many years, Holling dedicated much of his time and interest to making books for children. Much of the material he used was known to him firsthand. His wife, Lucille, worked with him on many of the illustrations.

== Honors and awards ==
He was a runner-up for the Caldecott Medal in 1942 for Paddle-to-the-Sea. He received the Commonwealth Club of California Literature Award in 1948 for Seabird, which was also a runner-up for the Newbery Medal in 1949. He was a runner-up for the Newbery Medal again in 1952 for Minn of the Mississippi. With his wife, Lucille, he received the Southern California Council on Literature Award in 1961 for Pagoo.

== Published works ==
- Sun and Smoke, A Book of New Mexico, Holling Clancy Holling, 1923. OCLC 862154839
- Little Big Bye-and-Bye. P. F. Volland Co., 1926. OCLC 4707560
- Rum Tum Tummy: The Elephant Who Ate. Buzza Co., 1927. OCLC 18034054
- Claws of the Thunderbird. P. F. Volland Co., 1928. OCLC 2290354
- With Gordon Volland. The Rollaway Twins and Their Famous World Flight: A Complete News-Reel. Minneapolis: Buzza Company, 1928. OCLC 777772481
- Rocky Billy [1928]
- Choo-Me-Shoo Buzza Co., 1928. OCLC 17990617
- Children of Other Lands [1929]
- Twins Who Flew Around the World [1930]
- Book of Indians [1935]
- Book of Cowboys [1936]
- Little Buffalo Boy [1939]
- Paddle-to-the-Sea [1941] A small canoe carved by an Indian boy makes a journey from Lake Superior all the way to the Atlantic Ocean. The book won a Caldecott Honor.
- Tree in the Trail [1942] A cottonwood tree watches the pageant of history on the Santa Fe Trail for over two hundred years.
- Seabird [1948] A scrimshaw ivory gull is the mascot for four generations of seafarers aboard a whaler, a clipper ship, a steamer, and an airplane. The book won a Newbery Honor.
- Minn of the Mississippi [1951] A snapping turtle hatched at the source of the Mississippi is carried through the heart of America to the Gulf of Mexico. The book won a Newbery Honor.
- A World Is Born [1955]
- Pagoo [1957] An intricate study of tide pool life is presented through the story of Pagoo, a hermit crab.

== The World Museum ==
Holling wrote and illustrated a full-page Sunday comic strip titled The World Museum. Each strip included a diorama which could be cut out and assembled into a 3-D scene of, for example, a buffalo hunt or an undersea panorama.
