= Drummer Hoff =

1967 picture book by Barbara and Ed Emberley

- Author: Barbara Emberley
- Illustrator: Ed Emberley
- Genre: Children's picture book
- Publisher: Prentice-Hall
- Publication date: 1967
- Publication place: United States
- ISBN: 0-671-66249-X
- OCLC: 17300593
- Dewey Decimal: 784.4/05 19
- LC Class: PZ8.3.E515 Dr 1987

Drummer Hoff is an illustrated children's book by Barbara and Ed Emberley. Ed Emberley won the 1968 Caldecott Medal for the book's illustrations. Written by Barbara Emberley, it tells a cumulative tale of seven soldiers who build a cannon named "Sultan", and Drummer Hoff, who fires it off, with the book exploding into a blast of colors. The last picture shows the exploded cannon at a future point in time among wildflowers and birds. The illustrations, done in woodcuts, evoke both 1960s psychedelica and Colonial American engravings. In 1969, the book was adapted into an animated 6 minute theatrical short, directed by Gene Deitch and produced by Morton Schindel of Weston Woods Studios. It was released on DVD in 2008.

== Characters (in order of appearance) ==
- Drummer Hoff; the king's stone-faced drummer
- Private Parriage; the young private who brought the carriage
- Corporal Farrell; the mustached corporal who brought the barrel
- Sergeant Chowder; the aging sergeant with an artificial leg who brought the powder
- Captain Bammer; the captain who brought the rammer
- Major Scott; the major who brought the shot (cannonball)
- General Border; the white-haired horse riding general who gave Drummer Hoff the order to fire

Each soldier's name rhymes with a step in the process of firing the gun, e.g. General Border gives the order, Sergeant Chowder brings the powder.

== Interpretation ==
Drummer Hoff has been described as an "ingenious picture book," one whose perfect simplicity may suggest some kind of "didactic intent." Ed Emberley denied that the book had any deep moral value to it:

The book’s main theme is a simple one — a group of happy warriors build a cannon that goes “KAHBAHBLOOM.” But, there is more to find if you "read" the pictures. They show that men can fall in love with war and, imitating the birds, go to meet it dressed as if to meet their sweethearts. The pictures also show that men can return from war sometimes with medals, and sometimes with wooden legs...The book’s primary purpose is, as it should be, to entertain.

According to the Online Computer Library Center, the book is "adapted from a folk verse." Ed Emberley explained that the book was adapted from the rhyme "John Ball Shot Them All," from the book The Annotated Mother Goose: Nursery Rhymes Old and New, Arranged and Explained, edited by William S. Baring-Gould and his wife Lucile "Ceil" Baring-Gould. The original rhyme goes:

John Patch made the match,
And John Clint made the flint,
And John Puzzle made the muzzle,
And John Crowder made the powder,
And John Block made the stock,
And John Brammer made the rammer,
And John Scott made the shot,
But John Ball shot them all.

James Orchard Halliwell-Phillipps suggests, in his preface to the poem, "conjecturing the John Ball of the following piece to be the priest who took so distinguished a part in the rebellion temp. Richard II." Kathleen Horning observes John Ball's "challenge to England's aristocracy," and she suggests, "It sounds like John Ball would have been right at home in the American political landscape of the 1960s, with the Woodstock generation trying to get itself 'back to the garden.'"

Drummer Hoff has been called an anti-war poem. Zena Sutherland remarked that on the last page, which takes place some time after the cannon has been fired, we are left with a scene "in which the passing of time has clothed the weapon with sweet signs of bucolic peace – a lovely surprise." Nonetheless, the precise political message of Drummer Hoff has not been pinpointed, and the Emberleys have shown no interest in explaining any personal motivations to make the story the way they did. Kathleen Horning wonders,

Were critics of the day ignoring the message? Did they not see a message? Or did they expect people to read between the lines? Perhaps in 1968, even at the height of the antiwar era, there was more tolerance for – or even outright acceptance of – the strong interest many young children have in toy guns and pretend explosions...Or perhaps the psychedelic counterculture colors and the final image of the cannon rusting in a field of flowers were enough to balance the violent action with an antiwar message.

Awards
Preceded by Sam, Bangs and Moonshine	Caldecott Medal recipient 1968	Succeeded by The Fool of the World and the Flying Ship
