= Daughter of the Mountains =

Children's book by Lousie Rankin, with illustrations by Kurt Wiese

First edition (publ. Viking Press)

Daughter of the Mountains is a children's novel by Louise Rankin. It tells the story of Momo, a Tibetan girl who undertakes a long and difficult journey to save her little dog Pempai, a Lhasa Terrier from the wool trader who stole him. The novel, illustrated by Kurt Wiese, was first published in 1948 and was a Newbery Honor recipient in 1949.
