= The Twelve and the Genii =

1962 children's novel by Pauline Clarke

- Front cover of first edition
- Author: Pauline Clarke
- Illustrator: Cecil Leslie
- Language: English
- Genre: Children's fantasy novel
- Publisher: Faber and Faber
- Publication date: 1962
- Publication place: United Kingdom
- Media type: Print (hardcover)
- Pages: 185 pp (first edition)
- OCLC: 559665894
- LC Class: PZ8.C552 Tw; PZ8.C552 Re2

The Twelve and the Genii, or The Return of the Twelves in the US, is a low fantasy novel for children by Pauline Clarke, first published by Faber in 1962 with illustrations by Cecil Leslie. It features a young boy and "what might have happened if the lost toy soldiers that once belonged to the Brontë children had ever been found again".

Clarke and The Twelve won the annual Carnegie Medal recognising the year's best children's book by a British citizen. Six years later she won the Deutscher Jugendliteraturpreis for the German-language edition, Die Zwölf vom Dachboden (Berlin: Dressler, 1968).

Coward–McCann published the first US edition in 1964, under new title The Return of the Twelves with new illustrations by Bernarda Bryson.

== Origin ==
"The Twelve" of the title are wooden soldiers that may come to life. "The Genii" are their protective spirits, from 1826 four Brontë children, now joined by Max and his sister Jane Morley.

The twelve toy soldiers once belonged to Branwell Brontë and his sisters. They were given to Branwell, the fourth of six children and only boy, by their father in 1826. The two eldest girls had died the preceding year and the four surviving children were 6 to 10 years old; they made the soldiers the centre of their imaginative life and their childhood literary efforts.

== Plot summary ==
Max is an eight-year-old boy whose family has just moved into an old farmhouse in Yorkshire. He discovers some old toy soldiers in the attic and is surprised and delighted to find that they come to life. The soldiers, known as the Twelves, or the Young Men, have different personalities; they are brave, intelligent and very independent, not to mention argumentative. They adopt Max as one of their Genii, or protective spirits, and he begins to spend most of his time watching and thinking about them. He learns from the local parson that they once belonged to the Brontës, who wrote stories about their adventures. When his older sister Jane discovers the secret, she becomes as keen on the soldiers as Max is.

The local newspaper publishes a letter about the Brontë wooden soldiers, from an American professor offering £5,000 (at the time a small fortune) to anyone who finds them. Max and Jane's older brother Philip believes the Morley soldiers may be the Brontë ones, and impulsively writes to the professor about them – only to deeply regret his act when he too discovers the truth.

The soldiers learn that they are in danger of being taken to America and disappear in the night. The children have some anxious moments before they discover that the soldiers have determined to return to their original home in Haworth, now a museum dedicated to the Brontës. Their march across the countryside is fraught with peril, but they finally reach safe haven with the protection of the Genii.

== Characters ==
- Max Morley, an 8-year-old boy
- Jane Morley, his 11-year-old sister
- Philip Morley, his 14-year-old brother
- Mr and Mrs Morley, their parents
- Mrs Hodgson, Mrs Morley's home help
- Bill, Mr Morley's help on the farm
- Mr Howson, a parson and Brontë fan
- Christopher Howson, his son
- Seneca D. Brewer, an American professor
- Mr Kettlewell, a local farmer
- A reporter from the local paper

Wooden soldiers

- Butter Crashey, the Patriarch of the Twelves
- Stumps, formerly Frederick Guelph, Duke of York – Max Morley's protégé
- Alexander Sneaky, formerly Buonaparte – Branwell Brontë's protégé
- The Duke of Wellington – Charlotte Brontë's protégé
- Parry – Emily Brontë's protégé
- Ross – Anne Brontë's protégé
- Gravey – Jane Morley's protégé
- Cheeky, the surgeon
- Bravey
- Crackey
- Monkey
- Tracky

Animals

- Brutus, the Morleys' cat
- Rover, Mr Kettlewell's dog
- A water rat

== Allusions to other works ==
The source for the adventures recounted to Max by the Patriarch of the Twelves is The History of the Young Men by Branwell Brontë. Parson Howson mentions the book and Mrs. Morley finds a copy which she intends to read to Max. This book convinces older brother Philip that the Morley soldiers are the Brontë ones.

Jane Morley has just finished reading Charlotte Brontë's Jane Eyre, which she loves, and she christens the handsome Mr. Howson "Mr. Rochester" after the hero.

== See also ==
- Brontë family: Literary evolution
- Anne Brontë: Education
- Branwell Brontë: Youth, with map of Angria

Awards
Preceded by A Stranger at Green Knowe	Carnegie Medal recipient 1962	Succeeded by Time of Trial
