= Anne Holm =

Danish writer

- Born: Else Anne Jørgensen; 10 September 1922; Jutland, Denmark
- Died: 27 December 1998 (aged 76); Copenhagen, Denmark
- Citizenship: Danish
- Spouse: Johan Holm
- Writing career
- Notable work: I am David

Anne Holm, born Else Anne Jørgensen (10 September 1922 – 27 December 1998) was a Danish journalist and children's writer. She also wrote under the pseudonym Adrien de Chandelle.

== Career ==
Her best-known fiction book is I Am David (1963), adapted for a 2003 film; (also published as North to Freedom), which tells the story of a 12-year-old boy who escapes from a concentration camp and travels through Europe. It won the ALA Notable Book award in 1965, the 1963 Best Scandinavian Children's Book award and the Boys Club of America Junior Book Award Gold Medal.

Holm also authored Peter (1966), which tells the story of a teenage boy who time travels to Ancient Greece and Medieval England.

== Personal life ==
She married Johan C. Holm in 1949. They had a son and two grandchildren at the time of her death.

== Bibliography ==
- I Am David (1963)
- Peter (1966)
- Adam og de voksne (1967)
- The Hostage (1980)
- Grew Red (1992)
