= Louise Rankin =

American children's author

- Born: July 2, 1897; Baltimore, Maryland, US
- Died: November 21, 1951; Washington, D.C., US
- Occupations: Author, editor, politician
- Writing career
- Genre: Children's literature

Louise Spieker Rankin (July 2, 1897 – November 21, 1951) was an American writer of children's literature, editor, and politician. Her debut children's novel, Daughter of the Mountains, was a Newbery Honor recipient in 1949.

== Biography ==
Louise Spieker was born in Baltimore, Maryland, in 1897. Her father, Edward Spieker, was a professor at Johns Hopkins University.

Spieker attended Goucher College and Johns Hopkins University. She married Everett H. Rankin, an executive for the Socony-Vacuum Oil Company; the pair resided in India, Tibet, and Sri Lanka from 1933 to 1942.

Daughter of the Mountains, inspired by an acquaintance Rankin met in the Himalayas, was published in 1948. It received positive press from Kirkus Reviews, won the award for books for children aged 8–12 from the Children's Book Festival sponsored by the New York Herald Tribune, and was named a Newbery Honor book in 1949.

Rankin wrote one other book for children, The Gentling of Jonathan (1950), which was less positively received. She also wrote a cookbook, An American Cook Book for India. Rankin additionally worked for Reader's Digest, and served as the state committeewoman from Tompkins County on the New York State Republican Committee.

Rankin died in Washington, D.C., on November 21, 1951.

Rankin's papers are held by the Cornell University library.
