= James Cloyd Bowman =

American writer (1880–1961)

- Born: January 18, 1880; Leipsic, Ohio
- Died: September 27, 1961 (aged 81)
- Education: Ohio Northern University (BS, 1905); Harvard University (AM, 1910)
- Occupations: Teacher and writer
- Writing career
- Notable awards: Newbery Honor (1938); Lewis Carroll Shelf Award (1958)

James Cloyd Bowman (January 18, 1880 – September 27, 1961) was an American teacher and writer primarily of children's books, college text books and journals. Born in Leipsic, Ohio, he grew up in Ohio and attended Ohio Northern University (B.S. 1905) with graduate studies at Harvard University (A.M. 1910). He taught English at Iowa State College (now Iowa State University of Science and Technology), and then at Northern State Teachers College (now Northern Michigan University) at Marquette, MI, where he was chair of the English department from 1921 to 1939.

Bowman received a Newbery Honor in 1938 for Pecos Bill: The Greatest Cowboy of All Time about the "legend" of Pecos Bill. In 1958, Pecos Bill won the Lewis Carroll Shelf Award.

== Works ==
Adult

- Into the Depths, University Press, 1905.
- The Gift of White Roses, 3rd revised edition, Pilgrim Press, 1914.
- Essays for College English, Heath, first series, 1915, second series, 1918. Editor with Louis I. Bredvold.
- The Promise of Country Life (short stories), Heath, 1916. As editor.
- An Inland Voyage and Travels with a Donkey (by Robert Louis Stevenson), Allyn and Bacon, 1918 and 1922. Editor.
- On the Des Moines (poems), Cornhill, 1921.
- Composition and Selected Essays for Normal Schools and Colleges, Harcourt, 1923. With J. Lawrence Eason.
- Contemporary American Criticism, Henry Holt, 1926. Editor.

Juvenile

- The Knight of the Chinese Dragon, Pfeifer Press, 1913.
- The Adventures of Paul Bunyan, Century, 1927.
- Tales From a Finnish Tupa (folk tales), translated by Aili Kolehmainen, Whitman, 1936 (published in England as Tales From a Finnish Fireside, Chatto & Windus, 1975). Compiler with Margery Bianco.
- Pecos Bill: The Greatest Cowboy of All Time, Whitman 1937, reprinted 1972, reprinted 2007 (ISBN 1-59017-224-8)
- Mystery Mountain, Whitman, 1940. A collaboration with Bowman's daughter and her playmates.
- Winabojo: Master of Life, Whitman, 1941.
- John Henry: The Rambling Black Ulysses, Whitman, 1942.
- Mike Fink: Snapping Turtle of the O-hi-o-o, Snag of the Mas-sa-sip, Little, Brown, 1957.
- Seven Silly Wise Men (excerpts from Tales From a Finnish Tupa), Whitman, 1965. With Margery Bianco.
- Who Was Tricked? (excerpts from Tales From a Finnish Tupa), Whitman, 1966. With Margery Bianco.

== Sources ==
- Bowman, James Cloyd. (2006). In Britannica Student Encyclopedia. Retrieved October 31, 2006, from Encyclopædia Britannica Online.
- Contemporary Authors Online, Gale, 2006. Reproduced in Biography Resource Center. Farmington Hills, Mich.: Thomson Gale. 2006. (subscription), Document Number: H1000010956.
- James Cloyd Bowman (1915). Essays for College English, via Google Books.
