= Tree in the Trail =

Tree in the Trail is a 1942 children's book, written and illustrated by American author and artist Holling C. Holling.

The book tells the story of a lone cottonwood tree encountered as a sapling by a Kansa Indian boy in 1610, on what became the Santa Fe Trail, and the events that passed by the tree: buffalo migrations, warring tribes, the coming of the Spaniards, French trappers, and trade caravans on the Trail. Eventually the tree dies and is made into an ox-yoke and travels down the Trail itself in 1834 to Santa Fe, New Mexico.
