= Pagoo =

1957 novel by Holling C. Holling

- First edition cover (pub. Houghton Mifflin)
- Author: Holling C. Holling
- Language: English
- Publisher: Houghton Mifflin
- Publication date: January 1, 1957
- Pages: 86
- OCLC: 306567

Pagoo is a 1957 illustrated children's book by Holling C. Holling.

The book tells the story of a hermit crab who is guided by instinct presented in the form of a voice called "Old Pal". In the process it presents a study of tide pool life. Pagoo faces various challenges, including growing out of his first shell and having to find a new one, and a predatory octopus.

Like most of Holling's works, it is lushly illustrated, containing many full-page color paintings. Pages with text in them are also generously illustrated, with black-and-white pen-and-ink drawings in the margins, many with explanatory captions. It was the last of two dozen books that Holling published over a three-decade career.
