= David Kherdian =

American poet

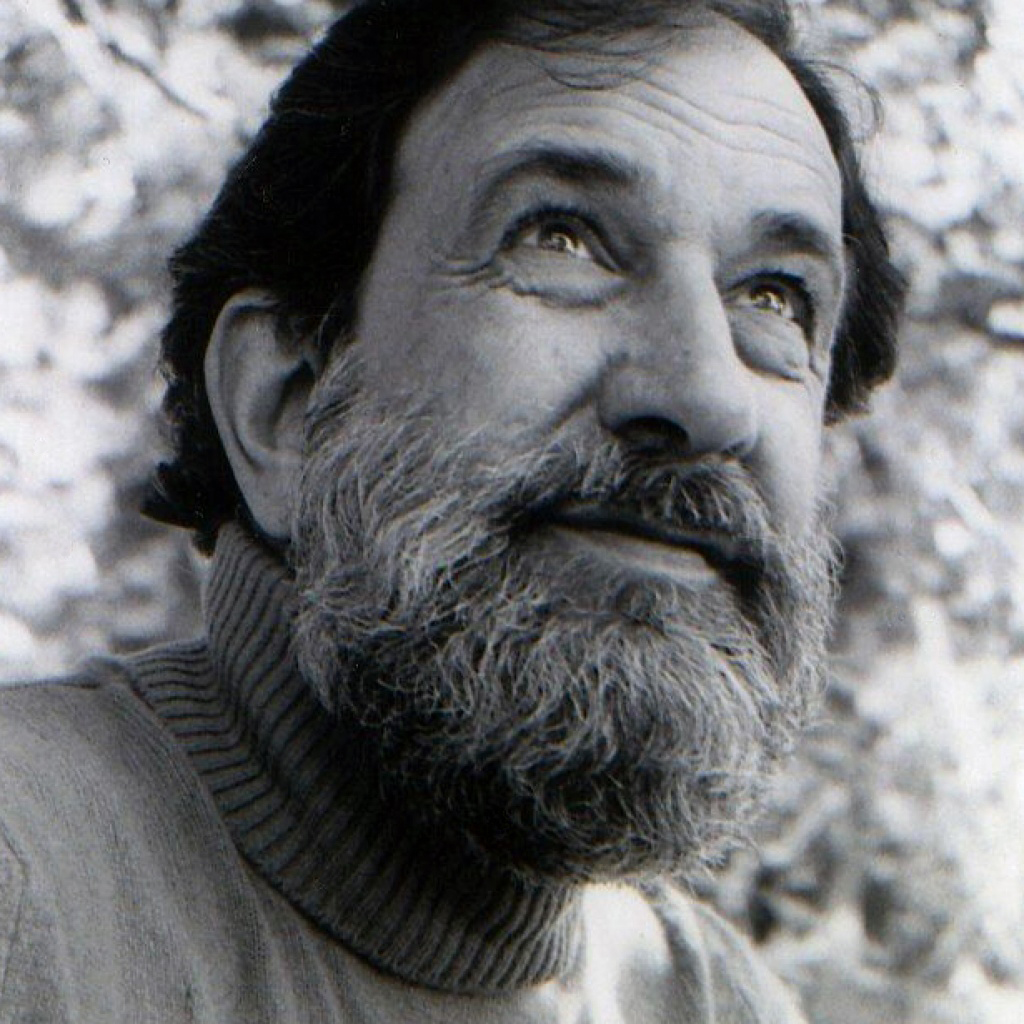
- Born: December 17, 1931 (age 94); Racine, Wisconsin, United States
- Occupations: Novelist; poet; biographer; publisher; editor
- Spouse: Nonny Hogrogian (m. 1971; died 2024)
- Writing career
- Notable work: Monkey: A Journey to the West David of Sassoun

Signature
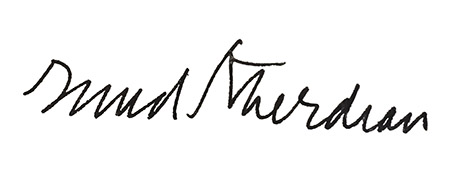

David Kherdian (born December 17, 1931) is an Armenian-American writer, poet, and editor. He is known best for his book, The Road from Home (1979), depicting his mother's childhood. His works have been translated into 14 languages.

== Early life and education ==
Kherdian was born on December 17, 1931, in Racine, Wisconsin, to Veron Duhmejian and Melkon Kherdian, both survivors of the Armenian genocide.

He dropped out of high school during the first semester of his junior year. After his service within the United States Army, he graduated from the University of Wisconsin with a B.S. degree in Philosophy.

He married Nonny Hogrogian, an Armenian illustrator, in 1971. She died at the age of 92 from cancer on May 9, 2024 in Holyoke, Massachusetts.

== Career ==
The majority of his early poems were written over a period of one month, during his first visit to the Berkshires of Massachusetts in the summer of 1970.

In the early 1970s, The Poets in Schools project was established, with Kherdian participating for New Hampshire. During this period, he published a series of three anthologies on contemporary American poetry with Macmillan: Visions of America: By the Poets of Our Time, Traveling America: With Today's Poets, and Settling America: The Ethnic Expression of 14 Contemporary American Poets.

Kherdian won the 1979 Boston Globe–Horn Book Award for children's non-fiction, and he was the only runner-up for the 1980 Newbery Medal, recognizing The Road from Home (1979), about the childhood of his mother Veron Dumehjian before and during the Armenian genocide. The book has been published in most European countries and in other countries including Japan. It has been reissued several times in the United States. The sequel, Finding Home (1981), describes her moving to the United States as a mail-order bride; it is sometimes cataloged as fiction.

In 2017, he published Starting from San Francisco: A Life In Writing, in which he wrote about his school years.

== Influences ==
Kherdian's influences include the Transcendental American poets Walt Whitman and Henry Thoreau, and American poet Emily Dickinson.

Kherdian credited the three large Kaiserlian families (comprising ten children in all) as his first literary influences during his childhood years. His best friend, Mikey Kaiserlian, was the subject of The Dividing River / The Meeting Shore, a collection of poems written following Kaiserlian's death. Mikey and his cousin, Ardie, appeared frequently in Kherdian's poems. Maggie, the oldest of all the Kaiserlian children, appeared in his autobiographical novella, Asking the River.

Permanent collections of Kherdian's work are part of the University of Connecticut Archive and Special Collections.
