= Robert H. Charles =

US Assistant Defense Secretary (1913–2000)

Robert H. Charles (1913–2000) was the United States Assistant Secretary of Defense for Installations and Logistics under Robert MacNamara. He was credited with the creation of the failed Total Package Procurement process for acquisition.

Prior to joining the administration, he worked for the McDonnell Aircraft Corporation.
