= Paddle-to-the-Sea =

Book by Holling C. Holling

- First edition
- Author: Holling C. Holling
- Published: 1941
- Publisher: Houghton Mifflin

Paddle-to-the-Sea is a 1941 children's book, written and illustrated by American author/artist Holling C. Holling and published by Houghton Mifflin. It was recognized as a Caldecott Honor Book in 1942.

The film Paddle to the Sea, based on this book but omitting many details, was produced by the National Film Board of Canada in 1966, directed by Bill Mason. It was nominated for an Oscar.

A water park based on the book was opened in 2016 in the town of Nipigon, where the fictional journey begins.

== Plot ==
At Lake Nipigon, Ontario, a First Nation boy carves a wooden model of an “Indian” in a canoe. On its side he roughly carves the words "Please put me back in the water. I am Paddle-to-the-Sea" and sets it free to travel the Great Lakes to the Atlantic Ocean. The story follows the progress of the little wooden canoe and paddler on their journey. It travels the Nipigon River wedged in a log of wood, and is rescued by a French-Canadian lumberjack just as it is going under the saw. He puts it back in the water. It is picked up several more times, but the inscription is always obeyed. At one point, a man finds the inscription very worn and adds a metal plate bearing similar words. As the canoe travels, those who send it on its way scratch their locations on the metal plate. It traverses all five Great Lakes (including going over Niagara Falls) and the St. Lawrence River. Finally after four years it arrives off Newfoundland at the Atlantic Ocean. There it is retrieved for the last time in the nets of a French trawler on the Grand Banks, and is taken to France. Its long journey is written up in a French newspaper. A copy arrives at the sawmill on the Nipigon River, sent from France by the cousin of the lumberjack. By chance, the original maker, now a grown man, is working there as a local guide and he also sees the newspaper. He recognizes his handiwork, but does not draw attention to it, and the book ends with his words of pride, spoken only to himself.

Each movement of the canoe is celebrated by a short chapter, suitable for reading aloud to a child and decorated with black-and-white sketches and at least one full-page watercolor, all by the author. The sketches accompany the larger story and tell smaller narrative stories of their own: for example, one sketch demonstrates how a sawmill works by visually outlining the progress of a log of timber towards a mechanical saw.
