= Freddy the Pilot =

1952 book written by Walter R. Brooks and illustrated by Kurt Wiese

- First edition - Dropping skunk and rabbit forces on the secret airstrip
- Author: Walter R. Brooks
- Illustrator: Kurt Wiese
- Language: American English
- Series: Freddy the Pig
- Genre: Children's novel, Comic novel
- Publisher: Knopf
- Publication place: U.S.
- Media type: Print (hardback and paperback), CD, cassette
- Pages: 245 (pp. 3 – 247)
- ISBN: 0-14-230044-6 (2001 Puffin)
- OCLC: 46590050
- LC Class: PZ7.B7994 Frt 2001
- Preceded by: Freddy Rides Again
- Followed by: Freddy and the Space Ship

Freddy the Pilot (1952) is the 19th book in the humorous children's Freddy the Pig series written by Walter R. Brooks and illustrated by Kurt Wiese. When an airplane from a secret airstrip terrorizes the performances of his friend Mr. Boomschmidt's circus, Freddy learns to fly, then gets a plane to track the criminals and stop their activities.

== Plot summary ==
Freddy is convincing Sniffy the skunk to read Robin Hood when Mr. Boomschmidt arrives at the Bean farm with Boomschmidt's Stupendous and Unexcelled Circus (formerly Boomschmidt's Colossal and Unparalleled Circus). He has a "snorter" of a dilemma, as he puts it. Mr. Boom invites the Bean animals to his small circus to observe. The show is interrupted by Mr. Condiment's lawyer, who claims that performer Mademoiselle Rose is endangered by the circus animals. The Bean farm animals easily put the lie to that, but the show is interrupted again by a plane bombing with sacks of flour. The performance is ruined.

Finally the truth comes from Mr. Boom who "pretended to be a lot more simple-minded than he was so as to mix people up": Condiment is behind the disruptions: forcing Rose to marry him. Freddy decides to learn to fly, and to chase the bomber. The flying instructor says he will be chasing a World War II fighter — faster than any plane Freddy can acquire. At any rate, Mr. Bean is so proud of Freddy he buys him a plane and turns Bean farmland into an airstrip. Reading of Freddy's feat in the newspapers attracts inventor Uncle Ben to the farm to perfect his bombsight, but the device cannot be perfected before generals come to evaluate it. They leave, unsatisfied.

In disguise as a woman, Freddy investigates Condiment. Condiment is pressuring the bookstore owner into carrying his comics, including Lorna, the Leopard Woman, In the Lair of the Great Serpent. The circus boa constrictor sneaks up on Condiment as a prank, suggesting, "Want a little hug?" He flees in terror, giving Freddy the idea to pose as Lorna. Using a phony Spanish accent, he visits Condiment, letting drop that he is the Leopard Woman.

Uncle Ben considers undermining enemies by selling them his defective bombsight, until Freddy discovers by accident that it is good at finding lost change. (This eventually proves to be more interesting to the generals.) Freddy's is plane now freed from bombsight testing, he takes it up for a ride. He arrives at the circus in time to spot the mysterious plane. He gives chase, but is outdistanced.

Back in his Leopard Woman disguise, Freddy lures Condiment into a dark circus trailer. He claims Condiment promised to marry him, and is enraged. The lights go off, and Freddy substitutes a live leopard for himself. When Condiment revives from fainting, Freddy is back, with Rose at his side. Condiment is convinced Freddy is the Leopard Woman, and cancels the comic. Freddy hopes Condiment is sufficiently frightened to leave Rose alone.

For days, unseen, Freddy follows the mysterious plane, starting closer to its destination each time, and finally locating its secret airfield. He returns to discover the skunks have taken Robin Hood to heart, and sporting quarterstaffs and bows. This gives Freddy the notion to use them as spies, parachuted by umbrella onto the distant airfield. The pig encourages the unenthusiastic skunks appropriately:

"'Why, how now, lads?' he said. 'Ye tell me ye be bound for a life of adventure in the merry greenwood, and yet methinks ye hang back when ‘tis question of trading hard knocks with a stout foe.'" (p. 131)

They protest they are not cowards like rabbits — which is overheard by one of the "Horrible Ten" gang of rabbits. This leads to two fracases, but the rabbits are appeased when allowed to join the mission. The team is successfully dropped on the airfield. After a couple days they tire of spying, and determine to destroy the plane. Without resources, they steal gunpowder from the criminals in a house by the airfield, and are highly pleased when they succeed in destroying it. Unaware, Freddy lands, and is discovered by Condiment not only to be a pig, but also the Leopard Woman. He is taken prisoner, but is soon freed by the skunks and rabbits. They easily convince Condiment he is about to be roasted and eaten for “People who read comics will believe almost anything”. Condiment is tied up, but later escapes, so the confrontation continues, until the gang escapes.

Freddy's detective partner, Mrs. Wiggins the cow, arrives in disguise, fooling him, and giving her the opportunity to say, "I know you! You’re the fat, lazy good-for-nothing pig that lives on poor old Mr. Bean." She disguises herself as the Demon Woman of Grisly Gulch — another character in Condiment's comic books. Completely cowed, as it were, Condiment is forced to write a confession of his crimes. Back at the circus, Rose cries when she reads it. In the moment of emotion, Condiment realizes he has a bargaining chip: in exchange for dropping charges, he informs Mr. Boom that Rose wants to marry him. There is a wedding the next day, and for the first time since Freddy has known him, Mr. Boom mixes himself up.

== Illustrations ==
There are 36 black and white, pen and ink drawings by Wiese, endpapers, and a full color cover, both depicting scenes from the book. Each chapter starts with a half page illustration, while a full-page illustration is placed close to an event within each chapter. There is an additional half page map of the secret airfield layout. The cover shows a P-39 Airacobra. However, as seen in the illustrations for chapters 9 and 17 and the endpapers, this is not Freddy's plane, but the one used by his adversaries. This is artistic license, as the P-39 was a famous WWII fighter, and well known to English speaking readers.

== Critical reception ==
Each novel in the series received moderately positive to strongly positive critical review in sources such as the Times Literary Supplement, Hornbook, and Kirkus Reviews. Reviews specific to this book include:

"Recommended for its general appeal for children of 9 - 11. Easily read by this group and fine for reading aloud." Library Journal (Dec. 1, 1952)

"As this mystery unfolds, Walter Brooks takes many good pokes at the 'comics'". The New York Times (Sarah Chokla Gross, Nov. 16, 1952)

== Publication history ==
The first edition was published in hardcover in 1952 by Knopf. The volume price was raised to $3.00 (over $20.00 in 2008 USD). The price had been unchanged since the increase on Freddy the Magician in 1947, when the price was the equivalent of more than $19.00 in 2008 USD. With the increase, the Freddy books were now effectively the same price as when the first volumes appeared in 1927. A new edition was distributed by Random House in 1986. The book was republished in 1999 by the Overlook Press. The book was republished in 2001 by Puffin Books, with the endpapers as an internal black and white illustration, and with a modified cover including 1/4 inch more of the bottom of Wiese's illustration than other editions. The book was republished in 2005 by Duckworth. An audio version read by John McDonough, running five hours on CD and cassette, is available from Recorded Books.
