= Freddy Plays Football =

1949 book written by Walter R. Brooks and illustrated by Kurt Wiese

- First edition - Freddy’s rushing disrupts the opposition
- Author: Walter R. Brooks
- Illustrator: Kurt Wiese
- Language: American English
- Series: Freddy the Pig
- Genre: Children's novel, Comic novel
- Published: 1949 A.A. Knopf; 2001 The Overlook Press
- Publication place: U.S.
- Media type: Print (hardback and paperback)
- Pages: 263 (pp. 2 – 265)
- ISBN: 1-58567-133-9 (2001 hardback)
- Preceded by: Freddy Goes Camping
- Followed by: Freddy the Cowboy

Freddy Plays Football (1949) is the 16th book in the humorous children's series Freddy the Pig written by American author Walter R. Brooks, and illustrated by Kurt Wiese. In it, Freddy and the Bean animals try to convince the Beans that Mrs. Bean’s long lost brother is a fake. Freddy lands in jail for stealing the money the fake is attempting to take. In the meanwhile Centerboro is taken with football fever on account of Freddy's playing.

== Plot summary ==
When Mrs. Bean’s long-lost brother, Aaron Doty, appears, he and his storytelling are warmly received. Soon the animals realize the stories of his accomplishments are lies, and Freddy begins to wonder if he is who he claims. Since taking his share of Mrs. Bean’s inheritance would force the Beans to sell the farm, Freddy urgently investigates. Evidence mounts, including a conversation overheard between Doty and the Bean animals’ old enemy Mr. Garble. The animals hold a rally, determining that Doty is a fake. Mrs. Bean however is unconvinced.

By chance Freddy is drawn into a high school football game. He cannot pass or catch, but his offensive rushing is unstoppable. With the agreement that he attend high school classes, Freddy joins the team. Since it is not possible for Freddy to attend school regularly, his cousin Weedly doubles for him, causing them both to be “half-educated”. Freddy’s first game is a success.

Mrs. Bean decides to pay Doty $5000, which she is forced to borrow. Freddy convinces the bank to give the money to him, and promptly disappears with it. The Beans are furious, and the sheriff has no option but to search for Freddy and arrest him. Freddy narrowly escapes being shot by Mr. Garble — but the sheriff has thoughtfully loaded Garble's gun with blanks. At first the money is hidden in the forest, but when Freddy is jailed it winds up being baked in a pie made accidentally of plaster of paris. Finally, the animals trick Doty into revealing his real name, and he leaves the farm.

Out on bail, Freddy continues playing football. Old Whibley the Owl defends Freddy in court, pointing out that neither of the key witnesses has reliable vision, and therefore could not positively identify Freddy as the thief. The judge lets Freddy off, adding "... but don't for goodness sake do it again!" Freddy is in good form for the important football game with a neighboring rival town, who have brought their own animals to match Freddy. The Centerboro team adds more animals, ultimately winning. Afterwards, an agreement is made, and all the animals quit the teams for good, so that next year regular football can be played.

== Characters ==
With the exception of "Aaron Doty" the characters are largely animals and humans from earlier books. Rich Mrs. Church, Old Whibley and Solomon the owls, and the Webb spiders have major roles, as does the villainous Mr. Garble. Doty does not return, so no new major characters are added to the series.

== Illustrations ==
There are 38 black and white, pen and ink drawings by Kurt Wiese. Each chapter starts with a half page illustration, with a full page illustration placed close to an event within each chapter. Endpapers and a full color cover depict scenes from the book.

== Critical reception ==
Each book in the series received moderately positive to strongly positive critical review in sources such as the Times Literary Supplement, and Hornbook.

"Fairly far fetched yarn, but the Freddy addicts are insatiable and uncritical." Kirkus Reviews, September 15, 1949.

"One misses the spontaneity of some of Freddy's earlier escapades, but children will read the book with enjoyment." Library Journal, October 15, 1949.

The New York Times mentions this book in its “One Hundred Outstanding Books for Children” on Nov. 13, 1949.

== Publication history ==
The first edition was published in hardcover in 1949 by A.A. Knopf. The price was $2.50 (well over $18 in 2009 USD). The book was republished in 2001 by the Overlook Press using the original illustrations, text and layout.
