= Freddy and the Perilous Adventure =

1942 book written by Walter R. Brooks and illustrated by Kurt Wiese

- First edition dust jacket with a comfortable adventuring moment.
- Author: Walter R. Brooks
- Illustrator: Kurt Wiese
- Language: American English
- Series: Freddy the Pig
- Genre: Children's novel, Comic novel
- Published: 1942 A.A. Knopf; 1986 Random House; 2001 The Overlook Press
- Publication place: U.S.
- Media type: Print (hardback)
- Pages: 243 (pp. 2 – 245)
- ISBN: 1-58567-178-9 (2001)
- Preceded by: Freddy and the Ignormus
- Followed by: Freddy and the Bean Home News

Freddy and the Perilous Adventure (1942) is the ninth book in the humorous children's series Freddy the Pig written by American author Walter R. Brooks, and illustrated by Kurt Wiese. Freddy, ducks Alice and Emma, and the Webb spiders are cast on a voyage when a fairground balloon will not return to the ground. Days later when landing, Freddy must confront the dishonest balloon owner who received money from Mr. Bean for damages.

== Plot summary ==
In a poetic mood, Freddy suggests ducks Alice and Emma repeat the feat of the first animals to fly in a balloon. But Mr. Golcher, a balloon owner who is in town, feels that Freddy giving a speech from the balloon would attract more customers. The balloon is released, but over the Bean farm they discover they cannot come down. By the time they float west over Syracuse, New York everyone is enjoying ride. During the cold night the wind changes direction. They are lost and out of food. A friendly eagle discovers them, takes a message to the Beans, and returns with a picnic basket.

As the next night passes they ride along with a thunderstorm. In the morning the balloon is low enough for the grapnel dangling over the edge to catch on a house. It is home to villains from the first book, who recognize Freddy, and narrowly miss capturing the balloon. The animals learn, however, that they are wanted by the police. Freddy decided to leave the balloon, even if it means a dangerous jump. After landing, the pig disguises himself, but is soon found by his friend the sheriff. Pretending he does not recognize him, the sheriff updates Freddy, who dangerously decides to return to the Bean farm, which is staked out by police. At the farm Golcher threatens Mr. Bean, who agrees to pay $200 for what Golcher has lost so far. Freddy calculates how long this will take to repay:

”’If it takes two years to get seven dollars,’ he said to Mrs. Wiggins, ‘how long would it take to get two hundred?’
’Seven hundred years,’ said Mrs. Wiggins.
Freddy didn’t think that was right….but Mrs. Wiggins stuck to seven hundred. ‘It’s only common sense,’ she said. ‘If you get seven dollars in two years, then in seven hundred you get two hundred.’” (p. 114)

Freddy hides at the circus of his friend Mr. Boomschmidt, who agrees to let elephants tow the balloon to the circus to be returned to Golcher. In the meantime, back at the balloon, the ducks Alice and Emma have discovered their long lost Uncle Wesley, who is making a living selling shoddy goods to forest animals. Disillusioned, they nonetheless ask him to return to the Bean farm.

Although his balloon is returned, Golcher proves quarrelsome, refusing to return Mr. Bean's money. Freddy and the animals agree to do a free show for Golcher, but afterward, Golcher still is not satisfied. Freddy and Golcher decide to resolve their differences in a fight ring, and Golcher makes a remark about eating pork that Freddy finds “in rather bad taste”. Freddy is losing a fair fight, until his spider friends bite Golcher. Golcher is ready to admit his defeat, but Freddy stops him.

”’Do you like being honest?” he asked.
’Not exactly,’ said Freddy truthfully.
’Then why do you do it when you don’t have to?’
’I don’t know. I suppose maybe because Mr. Bean thinks I’m honest. I sort of want him to be right.’ (p. 220)

Golcher decides to be honest for once himself, and returns Mr. Bean's money.

== Illustrations ==
There are 34 black and white, pen and ink drawings by Kurt Wiese. Each chapter starts with a half page illustration, while a full-page illustration is placed close to an event within each chapter. Endpapers in blue and beige and a full color dust jacket freely interpret scenes from the book. The dust jacket The hardcover is stamped in blue ink with a copy of the opening illustration for Chapter 1.

== Critical reception ==
Each book in the series received moderately positive to strongly positive critical review in sources such as the Times Literary Supplement, Kirkus Reviews, and Hornbook. Specifically reviewing Freddy and the Perilous Adventure:

"This book, a sequel to other Freddy books, is a credit to the ability of its author, Walter R. Brooks. The antics of parachute jumping mice and the all too human foibles of the duck family, combined with cows, spiders, and circus animals make a delightful story." Springfield Republican, November 8, 1942, p. 7e

== Publication history ==
The first edition was published in hardcover in 1942 by A.A. Knopf. The price was $2.00 (well over $21.00 in 2009 USD). It was republished in 1986 by Random House, and again in 2001 by the Overlook Press using the original illustrations, text and layout.
