= Freddy and Simon the Dictator =

1956 book written by Walter R. Brooks and illustrated by Kurt Wiese

- First edition - Freddy crowns his old enemy Simon
- Author: Walter R. Brooks
- Illustrator: Kurt Wiese
- Language: American English
- Series: Freddy the Pig
- Genre: Children's novel, Comic novel
- Publisher: Knopf; The Overlook Press
- Publication date: 1956 (Knopf), 2003 (Overlook)
- Publication place: U.S.
- Media type: Print (hardback and paperback)
- Pages: 243 (pp. 2 – 244)
- ISBN: 1-58567-359-5 (Overlook)
- Preceded by: Freddy and the Baseball Team From Mars
- Followed by: Freddy and the Flying Saucer Plans

Freddy and Simon the Dictator (1956) is the 24th book in the generally humorous children's series Freddy the Pig written by American author Walter R. Brooks and illustrated by Kurt Wiese. It tells how animals in New York State rebel against humans, destroying property and taking control of farms. At the same time, Freddy’s friend Mr. Camphor is pressured into running for governor. The situations collide when animals take over Camphor’s estate, imprisoning the political figures there.

Author Brooks was in ill health. There is an element of finality toward the end of the story, as Freddy’s foe Mr. Garble (encountered 13 books and 13 years before) is at last jailed. All animals are given the right to vote in human elections. Uncharacteristically foretelling, Brooks writes that years later Freddy is elected mayor of Centerboro. (p. 243)

Elements of its plot are similar to George Orwell's 1945 novel Animal Farm.

== Plot summary ==
The local rabbits have been much help to the Bean animals, so it is a surprise that some are vandalizing and stealing. Confronted, instead of apologizing, a rabbit criticizes Mrs. Bean, then gives ridiculous evidence that her husband was eaten by the Beans. Freddy and Jinx the cat investigate, discovering that the Grimby house in the woods next to the farm is used for political meetings. The speaker, inside a mechanical man that amplifies and distorts his voice, encourages the animal assembly to be "free" of humans. Freddy guesses their foe Mr. Garble is behind it. The A.B.I. (Animal Bureau of Investigation) is alerted to watch.

Freddy’s friend Mr. Camphor is asked to run for governor. This does not suit him ("I could sound like a fine governor, if I didn’t have to do any governing." p. 32). Camphor asks Freddy to visit the political meeting at his mansion, to say bad things about Camphor’s suitability. The pig, in his disguise as Dr. Hopper, invents faults, including that Camphor giggles in church and during speeches. But the political committee manages to see the bright side of these faults.

Money was stolen, and Mr. Bean’s handkerchief found at the crime scene. Since Mr. Bean’s laundry was stolen by rabbits, Freddy suspects a plot to organize animals against humans, telling lies that might be eventually believed. Miss Anguish, Camphor’s sister, is one of the guests. Her thinking is spacey, but it may be an act. She states that Freddy is a Hollywood film director. (So now Freddy is dealing with three odd sorts of thinking at once.)

Freddy tries convincing the committee again that Camphor is an unsuitable candidate: He proposes that all animals be given the right to vote! While the committee is deliberating, Freddy investigates the money theft.

Before he can collect evidence, Mr. Bean is jailed. Camphor joins the local Indian tribe to hide. Jinx discovers Simon the rat has returned, and with Mr. Garble is encouraging all animals to revolt and take control of farms from humans. To infiltrate the group, Jinx determines to pretend he has joined the revolution.

Freddy and Camphor’s butler, Bannister, are unable to convince Camphor to return; he has disguised himself as an Indian. The A.B.I. discovers the hideout where Garble is managing the revolution. They capture him, and smash the mechanical man used to make speeches.

It is too late to stop the revolution, however. Farms are taken over, including the Bean farm, which is then run by Jinx. Since the Bean animals do not know Jinx is undercover, he takes considerable abuse. To strike at the revolution, Freddy gets the cooperation of the captured Garble by convincing him that the Indians will burn him at the stake. Then Freddy turns to Simon, and for a while follows Jinx’s lead — only to trick Simon into sitting a cage disguised as a throne. With Simon out of the way, Camphor decides to appeal directly to the animals of the revolution, promising them the right to vote — which will make them the equals of people. This strikes a chord, and the revolution falters. Employing the aid of the dogs, who have generally stay loyal to their human masters, the farms are gradually recovered.

Garble escapes. He captures Freddy, Miss Anguish and Jinx, holding them for ransom. Miss Anguish tries to confuse their captors, but finally in desperation they set a fire to attract attention. Garble is recaptured and sent to prison. Simon and his criminal family are packed in a crate that is indefinitely shipped from place to place. The revolution fails. With the animal vote, Camphor becomes governor.

== Illustrations ==
There are 38 black and white, pen and ink drawings by Kurt Wiese, endpapers, and a full color cover, both depicting scenes from the book. Each chapter starts with a half page illustration, while a full page illustration is placed close to an event within each chapter.

== Critical reception ==
Each book in the series received moderately positive to strongly positive critical review in sources such as the Times Literary Supplement, and Hornbook, The New York Times, and Kirkus Reviews.

Kirkus (Nov. 12, 1956) "Simon the rat…rouses Freddy to those detective and protective measures which have endeared him to a long line of readers...Freddy's adventuring and politickings, his eventual quashing of the upstart rodents, mock some incidents we can think of in real life and form a pleasant expression of enlightened conservatism."

== Publication history ==
The first edition was published in hardcover in 1956 by Knopf. The price was $3.00 (about $19.00 in 2008 USD). The book was republished in 2003 by the Overlook Press using the original illustrations, text and layout. Unabridged audio recordings lasting 4.75 hours were read by John McDounough, and available as CDs or cassette tapes from Recorded Books in 2006.
