= Freddy and the Ignormus =

1941 book written by Walter R. Brooks and illustrated by Kurt Wiese

- First edition cover showing the attack on the rat’s headquarters
- Author: Walter R. Brooks
- Illustrator: Kurt Wiese
- Language: American English
- Series: Freddy the Pig
- Genre: Children's novel, Comic novel
- Published: 1941 A.A. Knopf, Random House; 1998 The Overlook Press; 2001 Puffin Books
- Publication place: U.S.
- Media type: Print (hardback and paperback)
- Pages: 282 (pp. 2 – 284)
- ISBN: 0-87951-882-0 (1998 hardback)
- OCLC: 39868206
- LC Class: PZ7.B7994 Fp 1998
- Preceded by: Freddy’s Cousin Weedly
- Followed by: Freddy and the Perilous Adventure

Freddy and the Ignormus (1941) is the 8th book in the humorous children's series Freddy the Pig by author Walter R. Brooks and illustrator Kurt Wiese. (It is the last book in the series before the U.S. enters the era of World War II.) There are dramatic reports of a monster in the dark woods near the Bean farm. When local animals are subject to extortion, Freddy and his friends test their bravery confronting the unknown.

== Plot summary ==
"'When you’re alone,' said Freddy firmly, 'and you hear or see something scares you, the thing to do is walk right up and find out what it is.'" (p. 9)

In answer, the stuttering frog Theodore challenges him to visit the Big Woods. The Woods were owned by Mr. Grimsby, who attacked animals. After he left, the Woods' reputation worsened. Not for the first or last time, Freddy and Theodore find it is easier to be brave when not in the Woods. When startled, they flee outside, only to meet their enemy Simon the Rat, who has seen their flight. He warns about a mysterious, killer "Ignormus".

Simon’s return prompts a general meeting of the F.A.R. (First Animal Republic), a group once organized to tend the farm while the Beans vacationed. Many do not believe that Freddy was in the Big Woods, including Charles the rooster.

"'Or is it, as some old legends tell, a bird with the head of a lion?...Is its name, as Simon says, the Ignormus? No one knows.'
'If you just got up to tell us that you don’t know anything,' said Old Whibley...'you can sit down again. We knew that before.'" (p. 51)

Freddy dares Charles to go into the Big Woods with him. Charles is frightened, but his wife Henrietta bullies him. The rooster and Freddy arrive independently in the woods. Freddy’s imagination turns a sighting of the rooster into a creature with a long snout and tail feathers. Charles in turn mistakes the pig. After Charles brags widely, they discover that they only saw one other.

The animal’s bank is robbed, the Ignormus is suspected. Freddy disguises himself as a hunter, borrowing Mr. Bean’s shotgun. While investigating the old Grismby house Freddy fires at what he thinks is a snake, knocking himself out. When he revives the shotgun is missing. At the farm, the practical cow, Mrs. Wiggins modestly questions why such a terrible Ignormus would not confront Freddy. "'I don’t know what I mean...I just say what I think. You’re smart. It’s up to you to figure out what I mean.'" (p. 130)

The Bean farm is robbed, and missing items are found in Freddy’s pigpen. Freddy gets a report that animals are being threatened in the name of the Ignormus. Investigating, an extortion letter in familiar handwriting is found. Jinx the cat is unimpressed with the pig’s deductions:

"'To the eye of the trained detective nothing is ever just what it seems to be.'
'What does that make you, then?' said the cat." (p. 160)

Suspiciously, walking the Big Woods road, seeking the letter writer, they once again meet Simon. Then a huge white shape with horns floats from the woods, and they flee. Returning to the Grimsby house, the missing shotgun is pointed at Freddy and Theodore from a window. Retreating to the bridge where the animals are leaving goods extorted from them, they encounter Charles talking with the Ignormus’ small henchman. Hidden, Freddy mimics the henchman’s voice, insulting the rooster and sending him into a fighting fury. Charles wins the fight (and gains the reputation that follows him through the rest of the series). They discover that the henchman is Simon’s son just before he escapes.

Frightened animals are starting to leave the farm when Freddy gives a speech pointing out that they are "deserting under fire". Animal patriotism and fighting spirit are roused. A beetle volunteers to climb up the shotgun barrels to gnaw out the gunshot. F.A.R. president Mrs. Wiggins organizes her troops. Charging the Grimsby house, they are halted by Simon. But he just has insults and seeks no compromise. The charge continues, the gun goes off, the gunpowder alone slightly injuring Freddy. The house is overrun, but they only find Simon and his gang. Old Whibley the owl reveals the final mystery, dropping on Freddy the weighted bedsheet used to allow the "Ignormus" to drift through air. Mrs. Bean is sympathetic about the rats' trials, and they accept her offer of hospitality, except Simon, "I don’t want kind words, and I don’t deserve them." (p. 278) The rest of the animals throw a party. But at the end, Jinx observes that there will always be "Ignormuses".

== Illustrations ==
There are 32 black and white, pen and ink drawings by Kurt Wiese. Each chapter starts with a half page illustration, while a full page illustration is placed close to an event within each chapter. Endpapers and a full color cover depict scenes from the book.

== Critical reception ==
Each book in the series received moderately positive to strongly positive critical review in sources such as the Times Literary Supplement, and Hornbook, The New York Times, and Kirkus Reviews

Library Journal (September 1, 1941) "The children who have eagerly followed the adventures of Farmer Bean's talking animals since the first story, To and Again, was published will hail with delight this new story of Freddy, the poetic pig...Kurt Wiese's humorous illustrations well portray the events in the solving of this rollicking animal mystery story."

Books (October 26, 1941) "The undeniable charm of this story, like the earlier Freddy books, is not in morals, but in crisp talk between the animals. This goes on in good American; a better language can't be found for give-and-take. I don't know that any one has called attention to a basic likeness in character between Freddy and Pooh; Freddy is not a pet, he is less wistful, but he has the same innocent vanity and boundless good will."

== History ==
An early review is September 1, 1941, placing the writing several months before the attack at Pearl Harbor, while war was gathering. The first edition was published in hardcover in 1941 by A.A. Knopf. The price was $2.00 (over $23.00 in 2009 USD). The book was republished in 1998 by the Overlook Press using the original illustrations, text and layout. It was republished by Puffin Books in 2001.
