= Freddy and the Bean Home News =

1943 book written by Walter R. Brooks and illustrated by Kurt Wiese

- Distributing the Bean Home News
- Author: Walter R. Brooks
- Illustrator: Kurt Wiese
- Language: American English
- Series: Freddy the Pig
- Genre: Children's novel, Comic novel
- Published: 1943 A.A. Knopf; 2000 The Overlook Press; 2002 Puffin Books
- Publication place: U.S.
- Media type: Print (hardback and paperback)
- Pages: 228 (pp. 2 – 230)
- ISBN: 0-14-230088-8 (Puffin paperback)
- OCLC: 47930650
- LC Class: PZ7.B7994 Foc 2002
- Preceded by: Freddy and the Perilous Adventure
- Followed by: Freddy and Mr. Camphor

Freddy and the Bean Home News (1943) is the tenth book in the humorous children's series Freddy the Pig written by American author Walter R. Brooks and illustrated by Kurt Wiese. The story takes place when the United States was in the middle of World War II.

When freedom of the press is stifled in the area, Freddy starts his own paper. The competition between his reporting and the dishonest reporting of the other paper leads to his being arrested, tried in court and kidnapped. The town rises to Freddy's defense and frees him.

== Plot summary ==
On a cold March morning, Charles the rooster malingers about going outside to crow. His attempts to avoid work actually make him too sick to do work. Freddy convinces the Bean animals to join in the neighborhood scrap drive contest, finding unneeded metal to help win the war.

Freddy takes news input to the newspaper offices of the Guardian to discover that his friend, the editor Mr. Dimsey, has been fired. The owner of the paper, Mrs. Underdunk, put her nephew Mr. Garble in charge. With Dimsey's help, Freddy starts another paper The Bean Home News, for the animals. The Bean animals work on Dimsey's farm to pay for his time. Unexpectedly, several people in town have subscribed. This prompts the pig to hire reporters to collect the news from town.

The newspapers come into confrontation when Freddy is accidentally bumped into by Underdunk on the sidewalk. When the sheriff refuses to arrest the pig, Underdunk threatens to use her influence to put him out of office. She comes to the Bean farm, proclaiming that she will have Freddy shot. A joke meant for Charles backfires, further infuriating her.

The city reporter for the Bean Home News is collecting material:

"'Where in tunket did you get that item about Mr. Weezer and Miss Biles being engaged to be married? There wasn’t a soul in town knew about it. I ain’t even sure they knew about it themselves.'" (p. 88)

The Guardian calls Freddy a ferocious wild pig. Freddy responds in his paper with the true version of events. Citizens believe Freddy, drawing more threats from Underdunk. Charles the rooster is infuriated, and meeting his reputation from an earlier book, single-handedly attacks Garble. That leads Underdunk to demand Freddy's arrest as being the head of an animal gang. Freddy hides in his friend the sheriff's jail, which proves lucky, since when they come to arrest him, the sheriff points out that the pig is already "in custody".

When Freddy visits Old Whibley for advice, the owl determines to be Freddy's lawyer. He instructs Freddy to demand a jury trial, so that his friends will be on the jury. The animals constantly interrupt Garble's sleep, so that in the courtroom he is on the edge of falling asleep. Underdunk's case is unconvincing:

"'Did he bite you?'
'No.'....
'...you immediately called upon the sheriff to lock him up. Why?'
'...That pig cannot be trusted to behave himself."
'Why? Because he did not bite you?'" (p. 156)

Garble falls soundly asleep, losing his chance to testify. The jury votes Freddy innocent.

When Underdunk throws a gala party including a senator, the Bean animals cannot resist sneaking into the grounds to watch. When they are found, Freddy flees into the house just as a war blackout is called, and the house goes dark. Pretending to be the senator, Freddy announces that Underdunk is donating her prize lawn ornament to the Bean's scrap drive. In the chaos that follows when the lights come on, Freddy is captured and imprisoned. However the animals find him, and the authorities are notified. The police, sheriff and judge and many from town arrive in a loud mob.

"'Another interruption of that kind,' said the judge severely, 'and I will have this barnyard cleared.'" (p. 208)

Having been publicly caught, Underdunk and Garble agree to stop harassing Freddy. Her lawn ornament is given up, and the Bean animals win the scrap drive.

== Characters ==
Freddy lives on the Bean Farm with animal friends: dogs, cows, chickens and rabbits, as well as a variety of owls, jays, mice, spiders and wasps: several play a role in the book. Jerry the ant talks Freddy into teaching him how to read, and is employed as a spy. Mr. Garble and his aunt Mrs. Underdunk are introduced — appearing again a number of times, and not finally dealt with until near the end of the series.

== Illustrations ==
There are 30 black and white, pen and ink drawings by Kurt Wiese, endpapers, and a full color cover, both depicting scenes from the book. Each chapter starts with a half page illustration, while a full page illustration is placed close to an event within each chapter.

== Critical reception ==
Each book in the series received moderately positive to strongly positive critical review in sources such as the Times Literary Supplement, and Hornbook, The New York Times, and Kirkus Reviews.

== Publication history ==
The first edition was published in hardcover in 1943 by Alfred A. Knopf. The price was $2.00 (over $20.00 in 2007 USD). The book was republished in 2000 by the Overlook Press using the original illustrations, text and layout. The book was republished in paperback by Puffin Books.
