= Freddy and the Dragon =

1958 book written by Walter R. Brooks and illustrated by Kurt Wiese

- First edition - The dragon confronts the headless horseman
- Author: Walter R. Brooks
- Illustrator: Kurt Wiese
- Language: American English
- Series: Freddy the Pig
- Genre: Children's novel, Comic novel
- Published: 1958 Alfred A. Knopf; 2000 The Overlook Press
- Publication place: U.S.
- Media type: Print
- Pages: 237 (pp. 2 – 239)
- ISBN: 1-58567-026-X (2000 hardback)
- OCLC: 43465169
- LC Class: PZ7.B7994 Fod 2000
- Preceded by: Freddy and the Flying Saucer Plans

Freddy and the Dragon (1958) is the 26th and last book in the humorous children's series Freddy the Pig written by American author Walter R. Brooks and illustrated by Kurt Wiese. Freddy's attempts to catch the gang extorting money from Centerboro's city folk are hindered by a headless horseman. The dragon created as a circus attraction becomes a tool in fighting crime. The Bean animals settle accounts with the gang and with a long-standing foe.

== Plot summary ==
Back from a trip, Freddy is surprised that many in Centerboro want him arrested. Considerable property damage has been done by a gang including a pig looking like Freddy. Investigating, Freddy shows that damage done in one case could not have been done by him. He is still under suspicion, and is called for an unpleasant police questioning. He instructs the A.B.I. (Animal Bureau of Investigation) to search the countryside, and immediately discovers a bull who has been damaging farms and crops. Freddy's perfume-filled water pistols turn the bull Percy into a smelly laughing stock. He is subdued and they capture him.

The search for the gang continues. Most of Centerboro thinks Freddy is responsible for the crimes, but not the “solid” citizens. Since Freddy is the president of his animal bank, the town's human banker vouches for him:

"'You think that because he is a banker, he is incapable of committing a crime?'...
'Sir,' said Mr. Weezer, 'when a banker commits a crime, it is a big crime, a first-class crime, a crime on a scale with his standing in the community.'" (p. 62)

The Bean cow sisters discover that Percy is the father who abandoned them as calves; the bull is unmoved. He refuses to discuss his gang.

Freddy had been asked for a suggestion to help a circus. Now Uncle Ben the inventor suggests creating a fire-breathing dragon.

The gang begins demands for money. Freddy and Jinx the cat lie in ambush at the money drop site, but are terrified by the appearance along a dark road of a headless horseman. Once they have recovered, Freddy learns from the A.B.I. that many of the gang were seen in that area, including a scruffy pig.

Freddy has Samuel Jackson the mole burrow under Percy, to pretend to be his conscience. The mole convinces Percy to behave well, and to reveal the gang's hideout. Percy reforms his manners so successfully that he becomes popular. Freddy avoids arrest on a technicality.

The spiders Mr. and Mrs. Webb are sent to explore the gang's hideout. They discover a huge, complicated cave system, with many animals and people. Once Uncle Ben's dragon is ready the animals stake out the cave. The dragon upsets the headless horseman's activities, but the police are not convinced by the evidence. Scorning the cave map created by the spiders, they send in their own troops.

Although Freddy is in disguise to avoid arrest, he and Jinx intercept a new member coming to join the gang. Breaking into his hotel room, they steal the snake doing robberies. The snake is released far away, and the discouraged owner leaves town.

Some police troopers exploring the cave are missing. The police decide to use the spider's map and the animal's help. The gang is partly captured. The circus is held, and Samuel Jackson's fake medium makes the animal's enemy Mrs. Underdunk look foolish. The animals storm the cave and, with the help of Uncle Ben's atomic station wagon, also trap the headless horseman. The extortion money proves to be in the house of Mr. Anderson — another longstanding enemy. As the series closes, he is finally sent to the penitentiary.

== Illustrations ==
There are 32 black and white, pen and ink drawings by Kurt Wiese, endpapers, and a full color cover, both depicting scenes from the book. Each chapter starts with a half page illustration, while a full page illustration is placed close to an event within each chapter.

== Critical reception ==
Books in the series as a whole received moderately to strongly positive critical review in sources such as the Times Literary Supplement, The Horn Book, and The New York Times.

Reviewing Freddy and the Dragon, Kirkus Reviews (Oct. 20, 1958) said "The remarkable Pig tracks down a ruthless protection racket... he also manages to teach a contrite bull how to behave like a gentleman... To be published posthumously, this Freddy episode is in the style of the several dozen which precede it — sometimes funny, often slangy, and caught in a balance between parody and two-gunned adventure — a balance that over the years has had a consistent appeal."

== Publication history ==
The first edition was published posthumously in hardcover in 1958 by Alfred A. Knopf. The price was $3.50 (over $20.00 in 2007 USD). The book was republished in 2000 by the Overlook Press using the original illustrations, text and layout. The story, read by John McDonough, was released in 2001 on five CDs lasting 4.75 hours (ISBN B000JQ1B80).
