= Freddy the Politician =

1939 book written by Walter R. Brooks and illustrated by Kurt Wiese

- First edition cover (original title) - Mrs. Wiggins the cow in parade.
- Author: Walter R. Brooks
- Original title: Wiggins for President
- Illustrator: Kurt Wiese
- Language: American English
- Series: Freddy the Pig
- Genre: Children's novel, Comic novel
- Publisher: A.A. Knopf, The Overlook Press
- Publication date: 1939 (As Wiggins for President (Knopf), 1948 as Freddy the Politician (Knopf), 2000 as Freddy the Politician (Overlook)
- Publication place: U.S.
- Media type: Hardcover, paperback, cassette, and CD
- Pages: 251 (pp. 3 – 253)
- ISBN: 1-58567-080-4 (Overlook hardcover)
- Preceded by: The Clockwork Twin
- Followed by: Freddy’s Cousin Weedly

Freddy the Politician (1939) is the 6th book in the humorous children's series Freddy the Pig written by American author Walter R. Brooks and illustrated by Kurt Wiese. In this story, the Bean farm animals start a bank, and elect their first president, two institutions appearing through the rest of the series. Their honest and innocent approach is soon challenged by strangers from Washington.

== Plot summary ==
To encourage farmer Bean to go on his vacation, the animals decide to elect a president who can manage the farm while he is gone, and to start a bank to manage the farm money.

"'Yes, but how do you start a bank?' asked Eeny.
'Pooh! Nothing to it!' said the cat. 'You just—well, you just open it. Big sign over the door—"BANK." That’s all.'
'Oh,' said Eeny. 'So you call it a bank and then it’s a bank, hey?'
'Sure.'
'Oh,' said Eeny again. 'So then if I call you a big blowhard, what does that make you?'" (pp. 10-11)

During a fierce storm, a lost and exhausted woodpecker finds shelter in the farmhouse. The animals realize that the name John Quincy would be impressive for a bank manager and offer him the job. Freddy gets the job of secretary. Vaults are dug under a shed. The bank is a success, and within a few days the vaults are full. Mr. Bean approves, but when he tells Mr. Weezer, the banker in Centerboro, they have an argument causing Mr. Bean to withdraw all his money and place it in the animal bank.

When Jinx the cat proves uninterested in being a bank officer, John Quincy suggests bringing his father, Grover, from Washington. The woodpeckers proceed to hold a bank board meeting down a tunnel that is too small for Freddy. Since he cannot attend the meetings, control of the bank is taken from the Bean animals.

The woodpeckers also have a plan for winning the election. Since all animals on the farm can vote, the woodpeckers visit the local birds to get their support. Then Simon the rat and his family — old enemies of the Bean animals — show up. The Bean animals realize they must select a popular candidate carefully to avoid the woodpeckers or Simon taking control of the farm. Mrs. Wiggins the cow is chosen for her common sense and public speaking experience. Mrs. Wiggins laughed during the campaigning: the opposition says laughter is out of place in government. Old Whibley the owl calls this balderdash. The woodpeckers challenge Whibley to a duel, but he apologizes.

"'You apologize?' said Grover.
'Certainly. You are a stuffed shirt, and you do talk balderdash, but I apologize for saying so.'
'But that’s no apology,' said John Quincy.
'What do you mean, it’s no apology?' said the owl. 'Either I apologize or I don’t apologize. If I do, it’s an apology, isn’t it?'" (p. 123)

When Freddy comes for advice later about how to handle the woodpeckers, Whibley comments, "'He couldn’t do a ridiculous thing to save his life. That’s why he’s ridiculous all the time.'" (p. 136) Whibley has the practical suggestion for Freddy to dig a hole into the boardroom large enough for him. This done, Freddy blocks the other entrances, and calls a board meeting. The woodpeckers cannot get in, and Freddy votes himself bank president. When the animals find out that Freddy tricked the woodpeckers using the same trick that had been used against him, votes start to shift from the woodpecker party. The animals are “on the whole a good-natured crowd" on election day, but the woodpeckers have schemed to have the votes for Mrs. Wiggins ("W") counted for a party they support "Marcus" ("M", an upsidedown "W"). Freddy retorts that their ballots were probably intended to be for one of other the farm animals with the same initial, too.

Thwarted, Grover takes control of the powerful mechanical man (invented in an earlier book). The woodpeckers overthrow the animal government by force, taking Freddy prisoner. The woodpeckers launch a military campaign to expand their government to nearby farms and eventually the whole state. After they leave, Freddy escapes in disguise as an Irish woman, visiting the Centerboro bank manager to convince him the animal bank is no threat. Once he is on Freddy’s side, they snare Grover with a meeting in town. Grover is trapped in the mechanical man, removed, and replaced. Returning to the farm, the mechanical man instructs the woodpecker’s army to disperse. John Quincy and Grover, beaten on every front, leave the Bean farm peacefully.

== Illustrations ==
There are 34 black and white, pen and ink drawings by Kurt Wiese. Endpapers and a full color slipcover depict scenes from the book. Each chapter starts with a half page illustration, while a full page illustration is placed close to an event within chapters. Unlike later books, four shorter chapters do not have an illustration within the chapter. A full page illustration is the frontispiece from an event on page 101 — making it the only chapter in the series with two full page illustrations. The slipcover is peculiar (at least on the Overlook edition) in that the part of the art on the spine is duplicated. On other Freddy books the spine continues the front illustration seamlessly.

== Reception ==
Novels in the series received modestly positive to strongly positive critical review in sources such as the Times Literary Supplement, and Hornbook, and Kirkus Reviews. One review of the time for this book is among the least favorable, reflecting some librarians' dissatisfaction with the speech in the realistic, modern idiom of New York State.

Library Journal (Sept. 15, 1939) "While this is the sixth book in the series, the spontaneous gaiety of the style is unabated, and the author's sly satire never becomes objectionably unchildlike. These stories have not been so popular as the Dolittle books which they clearly resemble, but libraries where they have a steady following will find this latest volume equal in quality to the others and definitely superior to The Clockwork Twin."

The New York Times (Oct. 8, 1939) "The author has never succeeded in recapturing the spontaneous fun of his first story, To and Again. Though stereotyped in situation and commonplace in style, Wiggins for President tells a lively story and one which many young readers, though perhaps the less imaginative ones, will enjoy. Kurt Wiese's drawings are amusing and expressive."

== Publication history ==
The first edition was published in hardcover in 1939 by A.A. Knopf. The price was $2.00 (over $25.00 in 2008 USD). In terms of a dollar’s value, it is the most expensive new Freddy book released at any time. The book was republished by Knopf in 1986 and in 2000 by Overlook Press using the original illustrations, text and layout.

An audio version is available from Recorded Books, read by John McDonough, running six hours (ISBN 978-0-7887-9784-2).
