= Freddy the Pied Piper =

1946 book written by Walter R. Brooks and illustrated by Kurt Wiese

- Freddy and the mice dramatize leaving people’s homes
- Author: Walter R. Brooks
- Language: American English
- Series: Freddy the Pig
- Genre: Children's novel, comic novel
- Published: 1946 A.A. Knopf, Random House; 2002 The Overlook Press
- Publication place: U.S.
- Media type: Print (hardback)
- Pages: 251 (pp. 2 – 253)
- ISBN: 1-58567-226-2 (2002 hardback)
- OCLC: 48670490
- LC Class: PZ7.B7994 Frl 2002
- Preceded by: Freddy and the Popinjay
- Followed by: Freddy Goes Camping

Freddy the Pied Piper (1946) is the 13th book in the humorous children's series Freddy the Pig written by American author Walter R. Brooks, and illustrated by Kurt Wiese. It tells the tale of regathering circus animals following World War II, and of earning money to repair the disused circus equipment. The title refers to an incident where Freddy pretends to pipe mice out of town.

== Plot summary ==
On a snowy February 14, Freddy learns his friend Mr. Boomschmidt ran out of money for his circus during the war years, when performances were restricted. The animals scattered a year previously to manage for themselves. Freddy gets an appeal to reassemble them and find a way to finance restarting the circus. Valentines and Jinx the cat's painting aside, Freddy and Jinx go to Centerboro for advice. The bank will not loan money without collateral: “Chickens are off two cents, and lambs very weak. But rhinoceroses—not a very active market in them”. On a different matter, on Freddy's advice, the bank puts out cheese so the mice will not eat the money.

Freddy learns that the circus lion Leo is 200 miles away. He is lucky to catch his rich friend Mrs. Church driving that direction. She pays for a hotel while he and Jinx investigate. At Mrs. Guffin's pet shop Freddy buys a canary that winks at him while he is questioning. The canary turns out to be a chickadee dyed yellow; he gives Freddy enough information about Leo to confront Mrs. Guffin. They manage to free him, but are now fugitives, since Mrs. Guffin claims she owns Leo. She tries to reclaim him, but is held captive until Mrs. Church arrives to take them home.

Freddy's plan to solve the bank's mouse infestation attracted even more mice. Since the townspeople are also infested, he decides to go into business with cat acquaintances removing them. Soon they are earning good money toward restarting the circus, but Old Whibley the owl has a better plan: to rent a place for the town mice to stay the winter. The mice are won over. Freddy decides to stage a little theater, and the move into the new place is done in a parade with the pig leading as the Pied Piper.

Freddy decides to take the money earned and travel with Jinx and the circus animals to Mr. Boomschmidt. They almost reach him when they come across a race track. Some animals join a race. The rhinoceroses carrying the money is waylaid by a man from the track, and the money is stolen. They arrive at Mr. Boomschmidt's empty handed, but are welcomed just the same. While there, Freddy gets a tip from a buzzard they met on their journey, and the animals recover their money. To save Mr. Boomschmidt's pride, Freddy concocts a séance reading where the money he earned is discovered as hidden treasure. Satisfied, but not fooled, Mr. Boomschmidt restarts the circus.

== Illustrations ==
There are 32 black and white, pen and ink drawings by Kurt Wiese, endpapers, and a full color cover, both depicting scenes from the book. Each chapter starts with a half page illustration, while a full page illustration is placed close to an event within each chapter.

== Critical reception ==
Each book in the series received moderately positive to strongly positive critical review in sources such as the Times Literary Supplement, and Hornbook, The New York Times, and Kirkus Reviews. The contemporaneous reviews for Freddy the Pied Piper are among the least positive.

== History ==
The first edition was published hardcover in 1946 by A.A. Knopf. The price was set at $2.00 USD, equivalent to $33.02 USD in 2026. The book was republished in 2002 by the Overlook Press.
