= Freddy and the Baseball Team from Mars =

1955 book written by Walter R. Brooks and illustrated by Kurt Wiese

- Cover with Freddy in his disguise as the team coach
- Author: Walter R. Brooks
- Illustrator: Kurt Wiese
- Language: American English
- Series: Freddy the Pig
- Genre: Children's novel, Comic novel
- Publisher: Knopf, The Overlook Press
- Publication date: 1955 (Knopf), 1999 (Overlook Press)
- Publication place: U.S.
- Media type: Print (hardback)
- Pages: 239 (pp. 3 – 241)
- ISBN: 0-87951-942-8 (1999 hardback)
- OCLC: 42830698
- Preceded by: Freddy and the Men from Mars
- Followed by: Freddy and Simon the Dictator

Freddy and the Baseball Team from Mars (1955) is the 23rd book in the humorous children's series Freddy the Pig by American author Walter R. Brooks, illustrated by Kurt Wiese. Capitalizing on Martians' ability to pitch with any of four arms, Freddy creates a baseball team of Martians and circus animals to compete against neighboring towns. An old foe of Freddy's tries to rig the games.

== Plot summary ==
Freddy's ice skating with the animals on the bean farm is interrupted by a request from Mr. Boomschmidt, the circus owner, to find a kidnapped Martian. "Mr. Boom", already anticipating that Freddy will solve the case with his detective skills, muses that the Martians could use a more interesting activity than being a circus sideshow. Since they are fast and accurate throwers, the pig suggests a baseball team.

The immediate problem is finding the missing Martian, Squeak-squeak. A suspect is the criminal Anderson, whom Freddy has thwarted before, and who loiters around the circus. Since Freddy must remain unknown during his investigation, he dons the disguise of an old baseball coach named Henry Arquebus with glasses, an overcoat, and large beard, and moves to town. He cautiously lures Anderson into friendship. Freddy is puzzled when the Martians, at first eager for his help, now refuse to discuss Squeak-Squeak. Mr. Boom is certain they are in trouble, and encourages Freddy to investigate, anyhow.

The Martians are enthusiastic about baseball, especially after learning that the purpose of baseball is not, as they thought, to hit the batter and knock him unconscious. Practice begins on a muddy bean farm field. There are four Martians; most of the rest of the team are circus animals.

Freddy sets the robin Mr. J. J. Pomeroy, the head of the A.B.I. (Animal Bureau of Investigation), to watch the Martians and Anderson. Apparently unrelatedly, his rich friend Mrs. Church asks Freddy to investigate a burglary by a ghost in her house. Since the stolen necklace is costume jewelry worth only 25 cents, Freddy suggests a reward for "one third the value".

The team practices for a month, and spectators watch. Freddy (in his disguise as Mr. Arquebus) tells the Martians to swing at every pitch, no matter how wild. Freddy will not explain the reason for this, but apparently it has to do with the trick planned for the manager of the Tushville baseball team, Mr. Kurtz, who used professionals the previous year in an amateur game.

Despite being somewhat frightened, Freddy and Jinx the cat stake out Mrs. Church's house at night to confront the ghost. The burglar ghost proves human, but it escapes; and as no entry footprints could be found in the snow, Freddy and Mrs. Church still can not figure out how the burglar could have gotten in.

The first practice game draws many spectators, and Kurtz reckons that the game against his Tushville team will get a thousand paying tickets. He offers Mr. Boom a deal where the winner takes two-thirds of the receipts. The strange Martian pitching proves effective, but at bat, Freddy has them swing at any pitch. The other team members do the hitting and scoring. In the end, the Martians lose, 8–6.

Anderson returns the stolen necklace to Mrs. Church, claiming he is acting for another. (He is shocked and angered by the 10¢ reward, as he thought the necklace was genuine.) As his house is watched by the A.B.I, Freddy knows there is not another person, that Anderson is the thief, and that furthermore his main motive was to make Mrs. Church think her house is haunted, so that he could buy it cheaply and sell it at a higher price. When Freddy notices house paint on the Martian's flying saucer, he deduces that Anderson holds Squeak-squeak prisoner, and is forcing the Martians to help him steal; that it is with the help of the flying saucer that Anderson has entered houses undetected. An investigation of Anderson's house shows that Squeak-squeak was moved, and a telephone conversation between Anderson and an accomplice is overheard, during which Anderson calls the accomplice "Herb". Squeak-squeak is not there, but they find jewelry from other recent robberies.

The game with Tushville starts reasonably, for example with an elephant sliding into third base ("...when an elephant slides, something has to go.") With the elephant on third, Freddy reveals his plan, telling the two-foot Martians not to swing at anything. With the strike zone reduced to eight inches, the Martians walk every time at bat. They take the lead until the crook Anderson whispers something to them. The Martians disobey coach Freddy, start swinging, and lose the game.

Mrs. Peppercorn — from whom Freddy is renting in town — cheers him with her improved version of a Longfellow poem, for example changing:

"As a feather is wafted downward / From an eagle in his flight." to
"As a brick comes hurtling downward / From a rooftop, in a fight."

The poet-pig is not enormously impressed, but is shaken out of his funk and soon wonders if coach Kurtz is Anderson's accomplice; a telephone call proved that his name is Herb. Anderson approaches "Mr. Arquebus", asking help with a burglary. Since Freddy will be able to get proof, he agrees. When the flying saucer drops Anderson in a wealthy home, Freddy leaves and calls the police. Knowing where to look for Squeak-squeak the Martian allows Freddy to infiltrate Kurtz's house in yet another disguise, this time as an Irish widow. However, the Martian is securely locked away. With the help of a group of wasps, Freddy captures the Kurtzes, but when Anderson arrives with the police, the lawmen are unable to make sense of the confusion. They decide to lock everybody in the basement so that they can go see the baseball game. Mr. Boom finally arrives and frees all of them right in the middle of the game. The Martians can now play ball without fear, and they begin walking again, but Anderson has not given up. Mr. Boom is so tired from sawing through the basement door that he cannot play, and Freddy takes his place, pulling off his disguise as the crowd cheers. Anderson attempts to sabotage the game by blinding the batters with a mirror, but his plan fails and he is captured and sent to jail. Freddy and the Martians finally win the game, 12–11.

== Illustrations ==
There are 40 black and white, pen and ink drawings by Kurt Wiese, endpapers, a frontispiece and a full color cover, all depicting scenes from the book. Each chapter starts with a half page illustration, while a full-page illustration is placed close to an event within each chapter.

== Critical reception ==
Books in the series received moderately positive to strongly positive critical review in sources such as the Times Literary Supplement, and Hornbook, The New York Times, and Kirkus Reviews.

Kirkus Reviews (Sept. 17, 1955) "...our inimitable pig goes to bat for Mars again...news travels fast and it is a distressing blow to hear that Squeak-squeak, one of the Martians, has disappeared mysteriously. Through complicated but of course expertly planned strategy, Freddy finds Squeak-squeak, to the delight of his companions...It is to our delight too, and the baseball victory that hinges on Squeak-squeak's reappearance is knowingly reported."

== Publication history ==
The first edition was published in hardcover in 1955 by Knopf. The price was $3.00 (over $19.00 in 2007 USD). The book was republished in 1999 by the Overlook Press using the original illustrations, text and layout.
