= Freddy the Magician =

1947 book written by Walter R. Brooks and illustrated by Kurt Wiese

- First edition cover showing Jinx livening Freddy's performance
- Author: Walter R. Brooks
- Illustrator: Kurt Wiese
- Language: American English
- Series: Freddy the Pig
- Genre: Children's novel, Comic novel
- Published: 1947 Knopf; 2002 The Overlook Press
- Publication place: U.S.
- Media type: Print (hardback, paperback)
- Pages: 256 (pp. 3 - 258)
- ISBN: 1-58567-310-2 (Overlook Press hardback)
- OCLC: 50881813
- LC Class: PZ7.B7994 Frk 2002
- Preceded by: Freddy the Pied Piper
- Followed by: Freddy Goes Camping

Freddy the Magician (1947) is the 14th book in the humorous children's series Freddy the Pig written by American author Walter R. Brooks and illustrated by Kurt Wiese. Freddy is ecstatic over the opportunity to learn magic tricks from a professional. However, it becomes apparent that this is part of a criminal plot to recover stolen money. Freddy and the Bean animals match their magic and wits onstage and offstage against the crooked magician.

== Plot summary ==
When a storm damages Centerboro, the Bean farm animals volunteer to help Mr. Boomschmidt clean his circus grounds. Freddy is thrilled to meet Signor Zingo, the circus magician — until Zingo is unnecessarily rude about Freddy's friends. When the magician's rabbit Presto is fired, Freddy takes him to the farm to learn his magic tricks. Though this seems to work well, and Freddy masters many tricks, sometimes the rabbit is rude, like his ex-master. The zoo lion Leo visits Freddy at the farm, his mane sheared on account of hopeless tangles after his last visit to a beauty parlor. He warns that Zingo has used Presto in shady deals, and relates that Zingo has been fired, and is staying at Mr. Groper's hotel.

Freddy has become accomplished at simple tricks involving hidden pockets and wants to saw a girl in two. Jinx, the cat, suggests he and his sister do the trick, since it uses the front of one animal, and the back of the other. During the storm the magician's hat was lost; Zingo will not let Presto back until it is found. After the hat is recovered and placed into the bank vault, Presto claims that, unlike the magician's other tricks, the hat is magical, and really does make him invisible. His he demonstrates. Freddy considers, and is both sure it does make the rabbit vanish, and sure that it does not. "It's funny how you can have two opinions in your head like that at the same time," he says. Freddy decides to ask Old Whibley, the gruff yet wise owl, for advice, and is told to use his own eyes and "look at it". Freddy does and discovers a false bottom. Yet Presto shows no hurry about returning to Zingo.

Freddy goes to town to rent the theater to present a magic show. He visits the jail, where the sheriff and the inmates are his friends. It is effectively a friendly country club. When Freddy finds a thief among the inmates the sheriff says "...he will have to go. Can't have a thief in my jail." Jinx's sister Minx arrives, as talkative and boastful as ever. While setting up the show, Freddy learns that Presto has been recently seen with Zingo. The show opens, and without warning the rabbit Presto introduces an offer to pay five dollars to anyone if they can explain a trick. Zingo is in the audience, and explains many. Luckily, some of Freddy's tricks are new and cannot be explained. Zingo, however, still takes more money from Freddy than Freddy makes. Presto is captured by the Bean animals, and reveals that he only came to the farm to get the animals' help retrieving the magician's hat. In the process of being quizzed, the rabbit mistakenly gives Freddy the information needed to deduce that Zingo stole Boomschmidt’s money and was fired for it.

Minx believes the hat makes her invisible, so they play a pointed joke on her. They place her in the hat, then pretend she cannot be seen or heard. The farm animals are instructed to pretend she's not there, and also to make comments about how nice it is to have her gone. Convinced of her invisibility, she boldly eats food from the Bean's table; Mrs. Bean throws her off and drives her out of the house with a broom. Minx vows revenge.

Zingo announces his own magic show, which will challenge anyone to explain his tricks. When Freddy visits the sheriff, he learns that Zingo is staying at the hotel, refusing to pay bills on account of bugs in his food (that he has obviously placed there, himself). Freddy determines to check into the hotel in disguise as owner Ollie Groper's nephew, carrying with him a suitcase of mice, spiders and Jinx to spy on Zingo. In this way they watch the magician's activities, and learn that Minx will help Zingo rob the animal bank. Well-warned, the animals trap Zingo in the bank, but he shows his villainy by shooting his way out. Freddy's hotel role now makes Zingo suspicious, and they play dirty tricks on one other. Zingo frames Freddy in a department store by stuffing the pig's pockets with unpaid items. Zingo's insistence that he will forgive Freddy only if he gets his hat back rouses suspicion; on examination Boomschmidt's money is found in it.

Freddy and his team go into hiding in rooms under the stage where Zingo will perform, and make modifications to his equipment. During the show, one trick after another goes wrong. Some that do not, Freddy exposes. They repeatedly make fools of each other, until Zingo loses his temper and physically attacks. To settle their dispute on stage, Freddy challenges Zingo to an ESP contest, guessing what objects assistants in the audience are holding. Freddy uses insects to bring accurate and detailed information. The audience decides that Freddy wins. ("'...you're three times the magician Zing is — I don’t know but four times, eh, Leo?' 'You work it out, chief,' said the lion, 'I was never any good at figures.'")

Since the jail is too nice a place for him, to force Zingo out of the hotel and out of town, they turn his dining room tricks against him. Friendly bugs appear in his food, and when Zingo complains, disappear before others see them. Defeated, Zingo goes to the bus station, where the citizens and animals force him to return the rest of the stolen money. Zingo apologizes, but unlike most books, this time Freddy does not believe his adversary is really sorry. Groper thanks Freddy at length for ridding his hotel of his problem.

== Characters ==
Freddy lives on the Bean farm with animal friends: a cat, dogs, cows, chickens and rabbits, as well as a great variety of birds and insects: many of them play a role in this story. The only new character introduced is the magician Zingo, who is unpleasant to the point of murderousness. A returning character is hotel owner Mr. Groper, whose vocabulary is so advanced, adult readers may need a dictionary.

== Illustrations ==
There are 38 black and white, pen and ink drawings by Kurt Wiese and endpapers showing a theater with Freddy performing. Each chapter starts with a half page illustration, while a full page illustration is placed close to a major event within each chapter. The full page illustration from Chapter Nine is reproduced as a frontispiece. The full color cover shows Freddy and Jinx at the conclusion of a trick. Confusingly, the illustration on page eleven anticipates the lion's shorn appearance in later chapters.

== Critical reception ==
Each book in the series received moderately positive to strongly positive review in sources such as the Times Literary Supplement, Hornbook, and Kirkus Reviews.

The New York Times Jan. 18, 1948 review by Sarah Chokla Gross reads, "Although few 'series' of stories hold up the high level of the first success, this fourteenth story of Freddy the Pig, and his colleagues on the Bean far, a complete and self-contained story, is as funny, as absorbing and as unobtrusively instructive as the very first one…Mr. Brooks, a capital plot-maker has the skill and humor of Dr. Dolittle’s creator without Hugh Lofting's sometimes disconcerting biases. Kurt Wiese...draws them to the life." (See Doctor Dolittle.)

== Publication history ==
The first edition was published in hardcover in 1947 by A.A. Knopf. With this volume, the price was raised from $2.00 to $2.50 (more than $19.00 in 2008 USD). However, the price had been unchanged since the first book To and Again (aka Freddy Goes to Florida) was published in 1927, when the price was the equivalent of more than $20.00 2008 USD. That is, even with the nominal price increase, the books were still effectively less expensive than they were at the outset. The book was republished in 2002 by the Overlook Press using the original illustrations, text and layout.
