= Freddy and Mr. Camphor =

1944 book written by Walter R. Brooks and illustrated by Kurt Wiese

- Cover and spine, showing Freddy talking to the frogs
- Author: Walter R. Brooks
- Illustrator: Kurt Wiese
- Language: American English
- Series: Freddy the Pig
- Genre: Children's novel, Comic novel
- Published: 1944 A. A. Knopf; 2000 Overlook Press
- Publication place: U.S.
- Media type: Print (hardback and paperback)
- Pages: 258
- ISBN: 1-58567-027-8 (Overlook Press hardback)
- Preceded by: Freddy and the Bean Home News
- Followed by: Freddy and the Popinjay

Freddy and Mr. Camphor (1944) is the 11th book in the humorous children's series Freddy the Pig, written by American author Walter R. Brooks and illustrated by Kurt Wiese. It tells of Freddy's adventures confronting trespassers when he takes a job as an estate caretaker.

== Plot summary ==
When Freddy needs a change from running the animal newspaper and the animal bank that he established in earlier books, and he sees an offer to work as a caretaker on a local estate. He meets the eccentric Jimson Camphor and his proper butler, Bannister, who, Camphor explains, is "dignified for both of us". They have a running game reciting proverbs to match a situation, then arguing about whose is more appropriate.

After they leave Freddy settles comfortably into caretaking. Meals are served in the main house, while he lives on a luxury houseboat. The restful circumstances are interrupted by two sorts of trespassers, a gang of rats led by the malicious Simon, and a human criminal, Zebedee Winch, accompanied by his dirty-faced son. The rats are destroying everything that displeases them in Camphor's attic, while Zebedee and his son, finding that the cook is Zebedee’s runaway wife, take advantage by moving in to "visit" her.

When Camphor returns for a weekend, Zebedee frames Freddy by stealing Camphor's things. Freddy is fired, and returns to the Bean Farm. The animals are undecided how to respond. Meanwhile, since the United States is fighting World War II, the President is encouraging people to grow food in their own Victory Gardens. The farm bugs and insects throw a party where they patriotically decide to stop eating farm vegetables. The party is dampened when the rooster Charles starts one of his long-winded speeches. After he is forced to stop, the horsefly Zero crashes the party, telling everyone the war is somebody else's problem. Freddy drives Zero away, but now he has another enemy threatening revenge.

Mrs. Wiggins the Cow and Freddy are discussing Zebedee when they hear Jinx the Cat yowling. Instead of a problem, they discover the other animals playing Camphor and Bannister's game, but testing proverbs. Jinx, having tipped his milk dish over, howls until Mrs. Bean refills it, proving that it is useful to cry over spilt milk. Jinx tells the dog that "Any stick is good enough to beat a dog with". The dog replies that there are more ways than one way to skin a cat. Freddy joins the game, but attention soon turns to his problems.

The animals decide that Freddy, Jinx and the mice will sneak into Camphor’s house to implicate the Winches as thieves. However they are trapped inside when a door locks shut behind them. Freddy disguises himself in human clothes, and manages to fool Bannister long enough for Jinx and the mice to arrange his escape. The Winches recognize Freddy, but by this point nobody believes them, and the sheriff is called. Zebedee Winch tries to escape, but the sheriff catches him when Freddy's friend eagle forces his car off the road. The sheriff drives to Zebedee's house, and discovering Camphor's stolen property, arrests him.

To get Simon and his relatives out of their holes in Camphor's attic, Freddy employs fleas, but there still is a fight before he forces them to leave. Camphor forgives the Winches and allows them to work on his estate. Freddy goes to a patriotic bug meeting, where the horsefly Zero is allowed to debate Charles the Rooster. Losing the debate, he physically threatens Freddy, who has prepared by bringing friend toads; when the fly comes to sting, he is eaten.

Having been forgiven by Camphor, and helped restore his damaged portraits, Freddy tells Camphor the whole truth about what has happened. When Camphor thinks Freddy should write a book about it, Bannister produces the proverb, "There's no friend like a good book".

== Characters ==
Freddy usually lives on the Bean farm with animal friends, however much of this story takes place on Camphor's estate. Mrs. Wiggins the cow, Theodore the frog, as well as others play a role in the book. Camphor and Bannister are introduced (appearing again as major characters in Freddy Goes Camping). Zebedee Winch is a hardened criminal, openly discussing burglary and bank robbing. Simon is a vicious, deceitful rat who heads a family gang, often plotting revenge on Freddy.

== Illustrations ==
There are 34 black and white, pen and ink drawings by Kurt Wiese, endpapers, and a full color cover depicting scenes from the book. Each chapter starts with a half page illustration, while a full page illustration is placed close to an event within each chapter. Unusually for the series, starting with Chapter Four the half page illustration is a scene from the previous chapter, rather than the upcoming one.

== Critical reception ==
Each book in the series received moderately positive to strongly positive critical review in sources such as the New York Times, the Times Literary Supplement, Hornbook, and Kirkus. Freddy and Mr. Camphor was reviewed in the Library Journal of October 15, 1944 as "Sure-fire for children nine to twelve who ask for more stories like the Dr. Dolittles." (See Doctor Dolittle).

== Publication history ==
The first edition was published in hardcover in 1944 by A.A. Knopf and reprinted several times. The price was $2.00 (which corresponds to $36.58 in today's money). It was republished in 2000 by the Overlook Press using the same illustrations, text and layout. An unabridged analog audio version read by John McDonough was released in 2000 by Recorded Books on four cassettes running 5.25 hours.
