= The Collected Poems of Freddy the Pig =

1953 book written by Walter R. Brooks and illustrated by Kurt Wiese

- Author: Walter R. Brooks
- Illustrator: Kurt Wiese
- Series: Freddy the Pig
- Genre: Poetry
- Publisher: Alfred A. Knopf (first)
- Publication date: 1953; 1962 (Random House), 2001 (The Overlook Press)
- Publication place: U.S.
- Media type: Print (hardcover)
- Pages: 81 pp.
- ISBN: 1-58567-136-3 (2001)
- OCLC: 46314887
- Dewey Decimal: 811/.52 21
- LC Class: PZ8.3.B79 Co; PS3503.R733 C65 2001
- Preceded by: Freddy and the Spaceship
- Followed by: Freddy and the Men from Mars

The Collected Poems of Freddy the Pig (1953) is the brief 21st book in the humorous American children's series Freddy the Pig (1927 to 1958). The entire series, which otherwise comprises 25 novels, was written by Walter R. Brooks, illustrated by Kurt Wiese, and published by Alfred A. Knopf. The Collected Poems is primarily a reissue of poems and songs that had appeared in the first 20 novels, although it contains some new poems by Brooks and new illustrations by Wiese. One cover notes, "If it seems a bit hammy in spots, that is to be expected." It was republished in 1962 by Random House, and again in 2001 by the Overlook Press.

The original purchase price was $2.50 (well over $20.00 2011 USD).

On release The New York Times commented in part, "gaily decorated with line drawings by Kurt Wiese".
