= Freddy Goes Camping =

1948 book written by Walter R. Brooks and illustrated by Kurt Wiese

- First edition cover showing Freddy experimenting with flapjacks
- Author: Walter R. Brooks
- Language: American English
- Series: Freddy the Pig
- Genre: Children's novel, Comic novel
- Published: 1948 A.A. Knopf; 1986 Random House; 2001 The Overlook Press
- Publication place: U.S.
- Media type: Print (hardback and paperback)
- Pages: 256 (pp. 3 – 258)
- ISBN: 0-394-97602-9 (hardback)
- OCLC: 13507349
- LC Class: PZ7.B7994 Frb 1986
- Preceded by: Freddy the Magician
- Followed by: Freddy Plays Football

Freddy Goes Camping (1948) is the 15th book in the humorous children's series Freddy the Pig written by American author Walter R. Brooks, and illustrated by Kurt Wiese. When a hotel owner is forced to sell under mysterious circumstances, Freddy and his friend Mr. Camphor pose as campers to investigate.

== Plot summary ==
Camphor and his butler Bannister appear at the Bean farm, asking Freddy to send Camphor’s visiting aunts packing. Aunt Elmira is demanding, fat and gloomy. Aunt Minerva is bossy; she regularly burns her cooking. The aunts planned to stay at the hotel across the lake, but it is suddenly haunted. As before in Freddy and Mr. Camphor, Bannister and Camphor enjoy their game of reciting proverbs, then deciding if they are appropriate. Punning, Bannister says, "Go to the ant, thou sluggard."

Freddy and the cow Mrs. Wiggins walk to the estate, deciding that resolving the hotel’s problems will in turn solve Camphor’s problems. Camphor suggests that as campers, they can observe the hotel free of suspicion. Freddy grapples with the challenges of camping, such as making his first flapjacks (pancakes). Since animals would know Freddy, he is in disguise. Their first night they talk loudly — to establish themselves as campers to anyone overhearing. Mischievously, Camphor pokes holes in Freddy’s cover story about studying with a witch doctor:

(Freddy) "'...you put them on and then wish for whatever you want.'
'And do you get your wish?'
'Sometimes. And sometimes not. All depending.'
'On what?'
'Oh, on general conditions. This and that.'
'Very clear,' said Mr. Camphor. 'From your description I feel that I could almost make one myself.'" (p. 54)

There is a gunshot from the hotel. They find Mrs. Filmore, the owner, leaving the hotel on account of a ghost. They help her leave, but decide to remain themselves. Soon a lion-sized cat head smashes through a window, and they flee to camp. It is wrecked. On examination next morning, much of the hotel damage is caused by rats — probably Simon’s gang.

Freddy goes to Camphor’s for supplies, then to the Bean farm to update the animals. He is told of a meeting between Simon and the mysterious Mr. Eha, where the rat describes plans to attack the Camphor estate after Eha controls the hotel. Freddy returns to spy on the hotel, and overhears Simon plotting with Eha. Eha dons a ghost costume, and leaves to scare the campers: Freddy slips into the hotel, leaving mothballs in Eha’s coat pocket, so as to track him by smell. Freddy hurries back to camp, but Eha escapes.

Mr. Bean is at Camphor’s estate: to general surprise he is adeptly flattering Aunt Minerva.

The mothball smell is tracked to a Mr. Anderson in town. Realizing that Anderson is "Eha", Freddy barges into his office disguised as a doctor. The pig’s doctoring routine is unconvincing, and Freddy flees.

On a tip, the pig guesses that a tourist camp on the lake is a hideout. There, he finds his old adversary, Simon the rat. Simon is working with Anderson. Freddy uses the opportunity to slyly hint that the Bean farm will be undefended that night. Therefore everyone is actually prepared when Anderson and the rat gang come. Mrs. Bean calmly treats Anderson’s ghost disguise as the ghost of Mr. Bean’s grandfather. Anderson is routed by the animals’ own ghost versions, and the rats surrender after a shotgun blast.

Kind treatment from Mr. Bean, Camphor and the animals brings a change in Camphor’s aunts. Minerva is pleasant, and proves to be a good cook. Gloomy Elmira is so taken with Freddy’s poem about a swamp she decides to vacation there immediately.

A group returns to camp near the hotel. Anderson is there, renovating. When he visits, Bean spiders return with him, as spies. Knowing that Anderson has a terrible temper, insects are sent to bug him, especially to ruin his sleep. The fire department is called to a false alarm on the hotel property. Freddy sabotages Anderson’s car. When finally they confront the sleep-deprived Anderson, he is forced to return the hotel to Mrs. Filmore. Seeing they have lost, the rats leave. With all the problems resolved, the campers decide to continue enjoying their stay outdoors.

== Illustrations ==
There are 38 black and white, pen and ink drawings by Kurt Wiese, endpapers, and a full color cover, both depicting scenes from the book. Each chapter starts with a half page illustration, while a full page illustration is placed close to the event it depicts within each chapter.

== Critical reception ==
Each book in the series received moderately positive to strongly positive critical review in sources such as the Times Literary Supplement and Hornbook.

Kirkus Reviews described this novel as "The usual good, clean fun".

The New York Times (Nov. 7, 1948) described this novel as a "wonderfully involved chronicle".

== Publication history ==
The first edition was published in hardcover in 1948 by A.A. Knopf. The price was $2.50 (over $18.00 in 2007 USD). It was redistributed by Random House in 1986 in standard hardcover and library binding, with a new introduction by Michael Cart. It was republished in 2001 by the Overlook Press using the original illustrations, text and layout.
