= Freddy Rides Again =

1951 children's book by Walter R. Brooks

- First edition - Freddy and Jinx as cowboys
- Author: Walter R. Brooks
- Illustrator: Kurt Wiese
- Language: American English
- Series: Freddy the Pig
- Genre: Children's novel, Comic novel
- Publisher: A. A. Knopf, The Overlook Press, Recorded Books, Duckworth
- Publication date: 1951 (Knopf), 2002 (Overlook), 2006 (Duckworth)
- Publication place: U.S.
- Media type: Print (hardback and paperback), CD, cassette
- Pages: 238 (pp. 2-240)
- ISBN: 1-58567-268-8 (Overlook hardback)
- OCLC: 50095526
- LC Class: PZ7.B7994 Frg 2002
- Preceded by: Freddy the Cowboy
- Followed by: Freddy the Pilot

Freddy Rides Again (1951) is the 18th book in the children’s series Freddy the Pig, written by American author Walter R. Brooks and illustrated by Kurt Wiese. In it, the talking Bean farm animals confront rich new neighbors who demand changes in the farm community.

== Plot summary ==
John the fox is not frightened by new neighbors, the Margarines, holding foxhunts! So, still enjoying their Western roles from Freddy the Cowboy, wearing cowboy hats, neckerchiefs and boots, Freddy the pig and Jinx the cat saddle their mounts to follow the hunt. The fox leads it through a neighbor's house. It seems the fox's plan to anger neighbors about foxhunting will succeed until Mr. Margarine hands the neighbor a generous amount of money for damages. Riding with Mr. Margarine is his son Billy, who was rude to the animals as soon as he met them. But he was not a coward during the confrontation, prompting Freddy to speculate:

"I was just getting so I hated him, and then he has to go do something I admire him for. I wish people would be good all over or bad all over."

The Margarines' cat takes refuge at the Bean Farm, suspiciously claiming he was not given enough food at home. Freddy and Jinx decide to observe his actions, and in the process discover a rattlesnake in the neighborhood. After hearing the snake's plans to eat his friends, Freddy seeks the help of the sarcastic and intelligent owl, Old Whibley. After gibes, Whibley advises the animals to stay away until he catches the snake during his usual hunting. However Freddy traps the snake with bait made of chewing gum.

Billy comes to taunt the animals at the farm, but is driven off by their laughter. Later, Mr. Margarine appears, and the animals attempt to laugh him off, too. However Mr. Margarine hits Mr. Bean, enraging the animals, and they attack. Mr. Margarine has the sheriff issue an arrest warrant for Freddy and Charles the Rooster, so they go into hiding. From there they launch a series of raids on the local farms, intending to put the blame on the Margarines. As a result, Mr. Margarine advertises for a detective. Freddy dons a disguise as the unsavory "Commanche Kid", and answers the ad. He is hired to track down himself!

The news of Billy being driven from the Bean Farm spreads to the countryside, and animals laugh as he rides by. Wisely, he realizes there are people who are liked for themselves, not what they own. He finds the Commanche Kid for advice, and Billy is coming to an appreciation of his situation when news reaches the farm that Mr. Margarine has taken a Bean cow, Mrs. Wiggins, captive. When the small farm animals discover they cannot free her from her stall, they instead scare Mrs. Margarine in with the cow. The two come to amicable terms:

"Mrs. Margarine looked angry; then she laughed. 'I daresay you're right. I can hardly imagine myself keeping a promise to a cow.'
'A cow or a man — what's the difference,' Mrs. Wiggins said. 'It's you that makes the promise.'"

Freddy is now Billy's friend, and outfits him with similar cowboy clothes. A policeman arrests Billy, thinking it is Freddy. Freddy goes to the jail to correct the mistake, but while there, he and Billy are caught by Mr. Margarine, who threatens to shoot Freddy later on sight. After some time Freddy cannot bear living under threat, and challenges Mr. Margarine to a duel. However Freddy rigs it to make Mr. Margarine look a fool in front of witnesses, and Mr. Margarine finally admits defeat. The Bean animals throw their longest party. The next day, as Freddy and Billy ride off together, Billy announces the Margarines have given up foxhunting.

== Characters ==
Freddy lives on the Bean farm with animal friends: a cat, dogs, cows, chickens, ducks, and rabbits, as well as a variety of owls, jays, and toads: several play a role in the book. Mr. and Mrs. Margarine and their son Billy are introduced.

== Illustrations ==
There are 34 black and white, pen and ink drawings by Kurt Wiese, endpapers, a frontispiece and a full color cover depicting scenes from the book. Each chapter starts with a half page illustration, while a full page illustration is placed close to an event within each chapter.

== Critical reception ==
Novels in the series received moderately positive to strongly positive critical review in sources such as the Times Literary Supplement, Hornbook, and Kirkus Reviews. Reviews specific to this book:

"Mr. Wiese's pictures are still superb. Yes, Mr. Brooks has kept caught up with the favorite subjects of radio and TV, and many children of a new era twenty years after To and Again may prefer it to that most amusing minor masterpiece." (New York Herald Tribune Book Review, November 11, 1951, p. 5)

"New England flavor seasons this highly entertaining though soundly instructive tale of onerousness revamped, of strength in union, of the power of laughter." (New York Times, November 11, 1951, p.26)

== Publication history ==
The first edition was published in hardcover in 1951 by Knopf. The price was $2.50 (more than $17.00 in 2008 USD). It was republished in 2002 by the Overlook Press using the original illustrations, text and layout. It was republished in 2006 by Duckworth (ISBN 0715636030). An audio version read by John McDonough, running 5 hours on CD and cassette, was made by Recorded Books.
