= Freddy and the Men from Mars =

1954 book written by Walter R. Brooks and illustrated by Kurt Wiese

- First edition cover showing Freddy in detective disguise and the phony Martians
- Author: Walter R. Brooks
- Illustrator: Kurt Wiese
- Language: American English
- Series: Freddy the Pig
- Genre: Children's novel, Comic novel
- Published: 1954 Knopf; 2002 The Overlook Press
- Publication place: U.S.
- Media type: Print (hardback, paperback)
- Pages: 244 (pp. 3-246)
- ISBN: 1-58567-269-6 (Overlook Press hardback)
- OCLC: 50174198
- LC Class: PZ7.B7994 Fqm 2002
- Preceded by: The Collected Poems of Freddy the Pig
- Followed by: Freddy and the Baseball Team From Mars

Freddy and the Men from Mars (1954) is the 22nd book in the humorous children's series Freddy the Pig, written by American author Walter R. Brooks and illustrated by Kurt Wiese. It tells the story of the confrontation between Freddy and his friends, phony Martians, real Martians, and a circus con artist.

== Plot summary ==
Freddy reads an article announcing that Mr. Garble encountered a flying saucer and that Martians are displayed at Mr. Boomschmidt's circus. Since Garble is an old enemy, while Mr. Boom is a friend, Freddy visits the circus to warn him. Garble allows limited viewing of the Martians, so he must be lured away while Freddy's cohort Mrs. Peppercorn sneaks in. She finds the bearded Martians dressed in red costumes with gloves, and oddly "like a dog walking on its hind legs". The Martian introduces himself, spelling his name S-i-m-g-h-k (with a silent "i"). Inexplicably, Simghk is familiar with Freddy's poetry. He flatters Peppercorn, who eagerly explains she can do better:

"No, sir, my idea of poetry is something that everybody ain't done before. You don't use the old rhymes, like 'love' and 'dove' and 'eyes' and 'sighs.' You make words rhyme that nobody has ever rhymed before."

She recites her several thousand line poem, starting, "Some stars are large, some stars are small / And some are quite invisiball". The Martians are bored asleep. Later, Freddy is successful investigating: in getting the "Martians" to agree that Mars is nearer the sun than the Earth, he realizes they must be fakes. However, as the reputation of Boom's circus would be at risk, Freddy does not tell the owner what they discovered.

Willy, the circus boa constrictor, is sleeping over at Freddy's. They are awoken by the chickens Charles and Henrietta, who accuse the snake of abducting their chicks. This sends Freddy into detective mode. In confirming that the revolving chicken house door cannot be entered by the large snake, he is stuck, squeals loudly, and rouses the barnyard. Dogs, tracking rat smell, find a hole. Willy slithers in, retrieving Simon the rat, Freddy's longstanding foe. Shortly after they hold Simon captive, Garble announces that one of his Martians is missing. Garble reveals that he purchased the Grimsby property next to the Bean farm, and is demanding Uncle Ben Bean remove his space ship (built in Freddy and the Space Ship). Freddy deduces that Garble's false Martians are actually rats and threatens to reveal Garble's hoax unless the space ship is allowed to remain. Besides, they cannot expose the fake Martians without embarrassing the circus. However Freddy's philosophy is "When everything seems hopeless, the thing to do is stir it up good."

Freddy devises a plan to use a rabbit to replace the fake Martian rat that was captured. The rats remaining in the circus are not fooled, but Jinx the cat remains in their cage, forcing them to cooperate. When the crowd does not notice the difference, Freddy has all the "Martian" rats replaced with his "Martian" rabbits. Freddy investigates the Grimsby property with the help of an ex-burglar, however they are confined by Garble in his cellar.

Wholly unexpectedly, real Martians land, having come to examine the fake Martians, and to look at Uncle Ben's space ship. They are pear-shaped, have three eyes and four arms, and are entirely friendly. There are at an impasse communicating until it is discovered that spiders such as the elderly Mr. and Mrs. Webb can speak with them.

Freddy discovers the missing chicks are in the Garble cellar. As a ruse, Freddy spreads strawberry jam on the burglar and shouts for help. The burglar escapes, believing Freddy has too. The Martians take the first of several joy rides, landing finally at the circus, where they are amused by the false Martians. After a time they realize Freddy still needs rescuing, so the sheriff, the Martians, and circus folk overwhelm Garble's house, freeing Freddy and the chicks. Garble escapes to join his confederates, the rats. Rats being difficult to dislodge, Freddy makes use of ten sacks of rotten onions to taint the food at the Garble place. The rats retaliate by invading the space ship, and eating the stores. The Bean farm animals surround the space ship, but the rats unintentionally cause it to lift off; the rats are rescued from space only much later, although Uncle Ben's space ship is lost. The Martians stay with the circus, giving saucer rides and enjoying themselves.

== Characters ==
Freddy lives on the Bean farm with animal friends: a cat, dogs, cows, chickens and rabbits, as well as a great variety of birds and insects: several play a role in this book. Simon is a vicious, deceitful rat who heads a family gang, often plotting revenge on Freddy. Garble, introduced and bested by Freddy in Freddy and the Bean Home News, appears as an adversary.

== Illustrations ==
There are 42 black and white, pen and ink drawings by Kurt Wiese, endpapers, a frontispiece and a full color cover depicting scenes from the book. Each chapter starts with a half page illustration, while a full-page illustration is placed close to a major event within each chapter.

== Critical reception ==
Each book in the series received moderately positive to strongly positive critical review in sources such as the Times Literary Supplement, Hornbook, and Kirkus.

The New York Times review read, "Any adult reader who suspects (no child reader has this suspicion) that Walter Brooks may let his Freddy stories degenerate into the stereotype of 'series' books has only to read each new one, and at once be reassured. 'Freddy and the Men from Mars' is a case in point....Excitingly and amusingly, with the entry of real Martians, all is resolved." (Sarah Chokla Gross) Nov. 14, 1954.

A critic suggests that Wiese's pictures have become sketchier, and some appear rushed or unfinished, giving the picture of a lion after a visit to the beauty parlor in Chapter Nine as an example. It is noted that Brooks took a political risk during the McCarthy era, making fun of those who labeled others as communists on flimsy evidence.

== Publication history ==
The first edition was published in hardcover in 1954 by Knopf and reprinted several times. The price was $2.50 ($22 in 2016 USD). It was reissued in hardcover and paperback with different cover art by Leslie Morrill in 1986. It was republished in 2000 by the Overlook Press using the original illustrations, text and layout.
