= Garble =

Garble may refer to:

- Garble (My Little Pony), a character in My Little Pony
- Garble, a character in Freddy and the Men from Mars

== See also ==
- Grable, a surname (and list of people with the name)
