= Treffinger =

Treffinger is a surname. Notable people with the surname include:

- Carolyn Treffinger (1891–1991), American writer
- James W. Treffinger (born 1950), American lawyer and politician
