= Peter Mayer =

British-born American publisher (1936–2018)

- Born: Peter Michael Mayer; March 28, 1936; London, England
- Died: 11 May 2018 (aged 82); Manhattan, New York, U.S.
- Occupation: Publisher
- Known for: Founder of The Overlook Press

Peter Michael Mayer (28 March 1936 – 11 May 2018) was a British-born American independent publisher who was president of The Overlook Press/Peter Mayer Publishers, Inc., a Woodstock, New York–based publishing company he founded with his father in 1971. At the time of Overlook's founding, Mayer was head of Avon Books, a large New York–based paperback publisher. From 1978 to 1996, Mayer was CEO of Penguin Books, where he introduced a flexible style in editorial, marketing, and production. During his tenure, he was credited with reviving the company into "the most formidable and admired publisher in the English language". Recently, Mayer financially revived both Ardis, a publisher of Russian literature in English, and Duckworth, an independent publishing house in the UK.

== Early life and education ==
External videos
- Peter Mayer, Publisher, Web of Stories, 12 November 2015.

Born to a Jewish family in London, England, on 28 March 1936, Mayer migrated to the United States in 1939. He was raised in Kew Gardens, Queens, New York City. His father, Alfred, from Luxembourg, later established a glove manufacturing business while his mother, Lee, who was from Germany, was a homemaker. A Ford Foundation scholarship enabled him to earn his BA degree in English literature at Columbia College, going on to read PPE at Christ Church, Oxford University, where he graduated in 1954. He returned to Columbia in 1956 with a summa cum laude degree in English literature. He then served in the US Merchant Marine before being granted a graduate fellowship in comparative literature at Indiana University, and in 1959 earned a Fulbright scholarship to study German literature at the Freie Universität Berlin.

== Publishing career ==
In 1961 Mayer began work as an editorial assistant at Orion Press, followed in 1962 by a 14-year tenure at Avon Books, where he became Editor in Chief and Publisher. In 1971, during his time at Avon Books, Mayer founded his own publishing label, The Overlook Press. In the late 1970s he was appointed publisher and president of Pocket Books (Simon & Schuster). From 1978 to 1997, he was chairman and CEO of the Penguin group, overseeing Penguin's companies in the UK, US, Canada, Australia, New Zealand, Germany, the Netherlands, and India.

During his time at Penguin, Mayer courted controversy as he agreed to publish Salman Rushdie's 1988 novel, The Satanic Verses. The book led to a major argument with Ayatollah Khomeini, the Supreme Leader of Iran, issuing a fatwā instructing Muslims to kill the author. Mayer himself also became the recipient of threats.

After leaving Penguin, Mayer returned to his own firm, The Overlook Press, which he had been developing in his free time over the past few decades. His label aimed to be "a home for distinguished books that had been 'overlooked' by larger houses". The imprint was responsible for the resurrection of the Freddy the Pig series of children's books, returning them to print for the first time since 1958.

Under his presidency, The Overlook Press experienced a period of growth. Most notably, in 2002, they acquired Ardis Publishing, an imprint dedicated to Russian literature. This acquisition was followed up in 2003 by Mayer's decision to purchase Duckworth, which had gone into receivership. He remained President of The Overlook Press until his death in 2018.

== Awards ==
In 1996 Mayer was awarded the title Chevalier and Officier of the Ordre des Arts et des Lettres by the French Ministry of Culture. He also received many industry awards, including the Foundation of Indian Publishers' and Booksellers' Association Award for Outstanding Contribution to International Publishing (1996) and recognition as a Literary Market Place Most Distinguished Publisher. On 13 December 2007, the New York Center for Independent Publishing (NYCIP) honored Mayer with the Poor Richard Award for his lifetime contribution to independent book publishing, which was presented to him by literary agent Ed Victor. Mayer was also given a Lifetime Achievement Award from the London Book Fair (2008), and the Russian "Big Book Prize" for Distinguished International Achievement (2011).

== Personal life and death ==
Mayer was married to Mary Hall in 1980 but divorced in 1991.

He died at the age of 82 in his home in Manhattan, New York, due to complications related to amyloidosis.
