= Freddy the Pig =

Children's book series

Freddy the Pig is the central figure in a series of 26 children's books written between 1927 and 1958 by American author Walter R. Brooks and illustrated by Kurt Wiese, consisting of 25 novels and one poetry collection. The books focus on the adventures of a group of animals living on a farm in rural upstate New York.

Freddy is introduced as "the smallest and cleverest" of the pigs on the Bean farm. He is initially just one of the ensemble, but he becomes the central character shortly into the series. Freddy's interests drive the books as he becomes a detective, politician, newspaper editor, magician, pilot, and other vocations or avocations. A recurring villain is the slimy but dignified Simon, who leads a gang of criminal rats. Human characters include Mr. and Mrs. Bean (who own the farm), the population of local Centerboro, and human villains.

Much of the humor in the books is derived from the self-referential way in which the author acknowledges the unreality of talking animals, unlike other children's works in which they are accepted as normal. As the series progresses, the Bean Farm animals attain national fame for their ability to talk and read, and the humans whom they encounter are taken aback at first (though only momentarily) to find themselves conversing with animals. The stories reflect the social conditions at the time of writing; for example, the books published during World War II feature scrap drives and victory gardens.

== History ==
Brooks created his animals for To and Again, published in 1927 by Alfred A. Knopf. It took some time before their personalities were fully developed, along with their ability to talk to humans when they chose, beginning with the fourth volume in 1936. In the remainder of the series, the animals of the Bean Farm lead a highly developed life, variously operating a bank, a newspaper, the First Animal Republic, and Freddy's detective business, which follows the principles of Sherlock Holmes as Freddy knows them from his reading.

The books went out of print in the 1960s, despite their popularity in the 1940s and 1950s, but children's libraries continued to have them. At the turn of the millennium, the entire series was republished by The Overlook Press in response to requests from Freddy fans. In 2024 the first Freddy title, "To and Again", entered the public domain and was reprinted by the Friends of Freddy, Inc., a 501c3 literary organization of Freddy fans. The new edition features original color illustrations by graphic artist and writer Eric Shanower, and an introduction by book reviewer Michael Cart.

The audio and film rights to the series have been sold. Audio versions of some books were made and, as of 2009, others are apparently in preparation.

== Reception of books ==
Adam Hochschild describes the series in The New York Times Book Review as "the moral center of my childhood universe". He also observes that sales of the books have increased since when they were first written. Roger Sale sums it up in his history of children's literature: "If L. Frank Baum has a successor, it is Brooks." Columnist Nicholas Kristof named them among the best children's books ever and called them "funny, beautifully written gems."

== Location of stories ==
Nearly all the books focus on the Bean farm and Centerboro area, in Oneida County, upstate New York. Centerboro does not actually exist, nor do the other towns mentioned as being nearest (Aeschylus Center, Gomorrah Falls, South Pharisee, Plutarch Mills, and West Ninevah). However, other towns do exist, described as slightly farther away: Syracuse, Rome, Buffalo, and Utica, New York (mentioned, for example, in Freddy and the Baseball Team From Mars). This would put Centerboro somewhere east of Syracuse, close to where Brooks lived as a boy. However, in Freddy and Mr. Camphor, the nearby fictional lake Otesaraga is described as "thirty miles around, and only a mile across". This corresponds closely (and only) to Skaneateles Lake, some ten miles southwest of Syracuse. Regardless, the evidence supplied by Brooks points to the Bean farm being loosely within 30 miles southwest or generally east of Syracuse.

== Illustrations ==
The series is illustrated by Kurt Wiese, who became an award-winning illustrator and author (although not for the Freddy series). The first book was originally illustrated by Adolfo Best Maugard but redone by Wiese when the book was re-released. After the first books, the pattern of illustration was established: a half-page black and white drawing at the beginning of each chapter, and a full page black-and-white drawing within each chapter. The covers are line drawings colored with watercolor, each emphasizing a dominant color. The endpapers are two-tone illustrations, loosely matching the cover's color theme. For example, the yellow background and blue drawing of the endpapers for Freddy Rides Again match the yellow and blue colors of the cover (Freddy, a horse, and a goat are yellow). Wiese drew more than 900 illustrations for the series.

== Freddy books in order of publication ==
These are all 26 titles in the Freddy the Pig series. Five were originally published with other titles, in parentheses.

1. Freddy Goes to Florida, 1927 (To and Again), LCCN 2001-16049; re-issued as both Freddy Goes to Florida and Freddy's First Adventure in 1949
2. Freddy Goes to the North Pole, 1930 (More To and Again), LCCN 00-50151; re-titled
3. Freddy the Detective, 1932
4. Freddy and Freginald, 1936 (The Story of Freginald); re-titled 1952
5. Freddy and the Clockwork Twin, 1937 (The Clockwork Twin); re-titled
6. Freddy the Politician, 1939 (Wiggins for President); re-titled 1948
7. Freddy's Cousin Weedly, 1940
8. Freddy and the Ignormus, 1941
9. Freddy and the Perilous Adventure, 1942
10. Freddy and the Bean Home News, 1943
11. Freddy and Mr. Camphor, 1944
12. Freddy and the Popinjay, 1945
13. Freddy the Pied Piper, 1946
14. Freddy the Magician, 1947
15. Freddy Goes Camping, 1948
16. Freddy Plays Football, 1949
17. Freddy the Cowboy, 1950
18. Freddy Rides Again, 1951
19. Freddy the Pilot, 1952
20. Freddy and the Space Ship, 1953, LCCN 2001-48439
21. The Collected Poems of Freddy the Pig, 1953
22. Freddy and the Men from Mars, 1954
23. Freddy and the Baseball Team From Mars, 1955
24. Freddy and Simon the Dictator, 1956
25. Freddy and the Flying Saucer Plans, 1957
26. Freddy and the Dragon, 1958
