= Fish in the Air =

1948 Caldecott picture book

- First edition
- Author: Kurt Wiese
- Publisher: Viking Press
- Publication date: 1948
- Pages: unpaged
- Awards: Caldecott Honor

Fish in the Air is a 1948 picture book written and illustrated by Kurt Wiese. The book takes place in China and tells the story of a boy named Fish who is blown into the air after buying a kite. The book was a recipient of a 1949 Caldecott Honor for its illustrations.
