= Li Lun, Lad of Courage =

Book by Carolyn Treffinger

First edition (publ. Abingdon-Cokesbury Press)

Li Lun, Lad of Courage is a children's novel by Carolyn Treffinger. Set on an island off the coast of China, it tells the story of a boy who tries to survive and grow rice on a barren mountain after being banished from his village. The novel, illustrated by Kurt Wiese, was first published in 1947 and was a Newbery Honor recipient in 1948.
