= You Can Write Chinese =

1945 Picture book

- First edition
- Author: Kurt Wiese
- Publisher: Viking Press
- Publication date: 1945
- Pages: unpaged
- Awards: Caldecott Honor

You Can Write Chinese is a 1945 picture book by Kurt Wiese. A boy learns to write some basic Chinese characters. The book was a recipient of a 1946 Caldecott Honor for its illustrations.
