= Freddy Goes to the North Pole =

1930 book written by Walter R. Brooks

First edition (publ. Alfred A. Knopf)

Freddy goes to the North Pole (1930) (formerly published as More To and Again) is the second of the Freddy the Pig books written by Walter R. Brooks. It tells of how the animals of the Bean Farm went to rescue some of their animals friends who went on an expedition to the North Pole.

== Plot summary ==
In the beginning, Freddy had the idea to establish a tourism company called Barnyard Tours Inc. The animals agreed, and the company was formed. Animals could pay for a tour with food, or by doing work for Mr. Bean. Soon, however, Freddy and Jinx, the cat, were sick and tired of conducting the tours. Freddy suggested a trip to the North Pole. So they and four other animals set off.

A year passed, and the animals left began to worry. A mob formed in the barnyard triggered by a speech by Charles, the rooster. Then, Ferdinand, a crow from the expedition, came back and organized a rescue party. He said they had gone on a ship and crew were planning to eat Freddy. The sailors had said that they might try going to Santa Claus’ house.

Later, in the woods of Canada, two children and a bear joined the rescue party. However, it soon was discovered that Ferdinand forgot to bring food and clothing for the animals. Everything looked grim for Ferdinand for a minute, but he suddenly came up with the idea for a lecture tour. The animals of the woods brought in food and clothing they found in the woods.

Also, a few weeks later Charles and Jack, a dog, wandered away and were captured by some wolves. The animals, Charles and Jack, managed to drive the wolves away with the help of some ants. They finally arrived at Santa Claus’ house. The animals found Freddy there and also found a problem: The sailors were trying to turn Santa Claus's irregular workshop into an ordinary, assembly line factory.

The animals tried to make the sailors leave. They played ghosts, but one sailor wasn't scared. Then, Freddy sent the captain, Mr. Hooker, a treasure map. He thought all the sailors would go with him, but instead, he tried to get all of it for himself. Freddy and Jinx chased after him and took it back. Later, the whole crew of the ship was shown the map.

The sailors left and Santa Claus's workshop went back to normal. Santa Claus took the animals and the two children to the Bean Farm.
