= Grable =

Grable is a surname. Notable people with the surname include:

- Betty Grable (1916–1973), American dancer, singer, and actress
- Joyce Grable (1952–2023), American professional wrestler
- Judy Grable (1935–2008), American former professional wrestler
- Tylan Grable (born 1999), American football player
