= Carolyn Treffinger =

American novelist

- Born: Carolyn E. Treffinger; October 24, 1891
- Died: January 8, 1991 (aged 99)
- Occupation: Writer
- Writing career
- Genre: Children's literature
- Notable work: Li Lun, Lad of Courage

Carolyn E. Treffinger (October 24, 1891 – January 8, 1991) was an American children's author.

== Biography ==
Treffinger was born on October 24, 1891, in Seville, Ohio. Her parents were Amanda and Noah, and she had three siblings, Raymond, Mable and Glenn. The family lived in Wadsworth, Ohio. She graduated from Wittenberg College in Springfield, Ohio.

She wrote at least three books for children, including Rag-Doll Jane: Her Story and Jimmy's Shoes. Her most notable work was Li Lun, Lad of Courage, which was published in 1947 and won a Newbery Honor in 1948. Kurt Wiese illustrated it, and also won a Lewis Carroll Shelf Award in 1959.

Outside of her literary work, Treffinger was a teacher and principal in Wadsworth.

Treffinger died on January 8, 1991, at the age of 99 in Blue Hill, Nebraska. She is buried in Woodlawn Cemetery in Wadsworth, Ohio.

== Bibliography ==
- Rag-Doll Jane: Her Story: 1930 (illustrated by Fern Bisel Peat)
- Jimmy's Shoes: 1934 (illustrated by Ruth C. Collings)
- Li Lun, Lad of Courage: 1947 (illustrated by Kurt Wiese)
