= Freddy Goes to Florida =

1927 book by Walter R. Brooks

First edition (publ. Alfred A. Knopf)

Freddy Goes to Florida (1927) (formerly published as To and Again), is the first of the Freddy the Pig books written by Walter R. Brooks. It tells how the animals of the Bean Farm traveled to Florida and back again, and their adventures on the way.

== Plot summary ==
Freddy was an intelligent pig that lived on the Bean Farm. To avoid the cold winter at their farm in Upstate New York, the animals decided to vacation in Florida. At first Charles the rooster is prevented from joining them by his acerbic wife, Henrietta.

The animals encounter a man and a boy who wished to capture them. The animals scared them off. Later, Charles and Henrietta joined the group again. They also met the man and the boy, with the same results as last time. The animals were also joined by the man's black dog, Jack.

They next passed through Washington, D.C. where three senators took them on a tour of the city. At the end of the tour, one of the senators made a speech on how pleased he was by the animals' visit. A few days later, while walking towards Florida, a thunderstorm forced the animals to take refuge in an empty log house. A flock of swallows mention a pile of gold in the area.

The animals found the gold but were unable to take it with them, because they couldn't carry it. After meeting two men who tried to capture Hank, the old horse, and Mrs. Wiggins, a cow, the animals arrived at Florida only to get trapped on an island in a swamp by some alligators.

After they escaped the alligators, the farm animals started the long trek northward. Their further adventures included disguising themselves to get past the two kidnappers, returning stolen property to some townspeople, taking the pile of gold with them on an old carriage, and taking the gold back from the man and the boy who tried to steal it before they got back to the Bean farm. Once they got to the farm, they showed Mr. and Mrs. Bean the gold and they all danced merrily.
