= Kurt Wiese =

20th-Century German-American illustrator

- Born: April 22, 1887; Minden, Germany
- Died: May 27, 1974 (aged 87); Idell, Kingwood Township near Flemington, New Jersey
- Known for: Illustrator of children's books
- Notable work: Bambi: A Life in the Woods (1928), Freddy the Pig series (1927-1958), The Story about Ping (1933), The Five Chinese Brothers (1938)

Kurt Wiese (April 22, 1887 – May 27, 1974) was a German-born book illustrator, who wrote and illustrated 20 children's books and illustrated another 300 for other authors.

== Background ==
Kurt Wiese was born on April 22, 1887, in Minden, Germany. He aspired to be an artist but was discouraged by his community. He had at least one sibling, Ella Wiese, later Ella Barnberg.

== Career ==
Cover illustrated by Kurt Wiese for Jéca Tatuzinho by Monteiro Lobato (1924)

Wiese was sent to Hamburg to "learn about the export trade to China." From 1909 to 1915, Wiese lived, worked, and traveled in China. selling merchandise as a young man. At the outbreak of World War I, he was captured by the Japanese, and turned over to the British. He spent five years as a prisoner, most of them in Australia, where his fascination with the animal life inspired him to start sketching again. After his release at the end of the war, Wiese returned briefly to Germany and then moved to Brazil, where he began illustrating.

In 1927, Wiese moved to the United States. His first critical success was with the illustrations for Felix Salten's Bambi in 1928. From his farm in Kingwood Township, New Jersey, he worked with German master printmaker Theodore Cuno of Germantown, Pennsylvania, to create some of his lithographs.

== Personal life and death ==
In 1930, Wiese married Gertrude Hausen, a realtor, with whom he lived on a farm in Kingwood Township, New Jersey (or Frenchtown).

Kurt Wiese died age 87 on May 27, 1974, in Idell, Kingwood Township near Flemington, New Jersey.

== Awards ==
- Newbery Medal in 1933 for Young Fu of the Upper Yangtze(illustrator)
- Newbery Honor in 1936 for Honk, the Moose (illustrator)
- Caldecott Honor in 1946 for You Can Write Chinese (author, illustrator)
- Caldecott Honor in 1948 for Fish in the Air (author, illustrator)
- Newbery Honor in 1948 for Li Lun, Lad of Courage (illustrator)
- Newbery Honor in 1949 for Daughter of the Mountains (illustrator)

== Selected works ==
Freddy the Pig

Freddy the Pig was featured in 26 books written by Walter R. Brooks, illustrated by Wiese, and published by Alfred A. Knopf from 1927 to 1958. The first, titled To and Again – in reference to a constituent journey to and back again from Florida - was illustrated by Adolfo Best Maugard. The sequel, More To and Again - with a trip to the North Pole and back - was illustrated by Wiese. These first two books were later reprinted and retitled as Freddy Goes to Florida and Freddy Goes to the North Pole, with the former incorporating new illustrations by Wiese. They were followed by Freddy the Detective (1932), three more various titles, 19 novels with "Freddy" titles (1940–1958) and The Collected Poems of Freddy the Pig (1953). For some time all 25 novels have been issued with "Freddy" titles.

Others Brazil

- Jéca Tatuzinho by Monteiro Lobato (1924)

Others USA

The following books have New York City publishers, except as noted:

- Bambi, A Life in the Woods, translated by Whittaker Chambers from the 1923 German by Felix Salten (Simon & Schuster, 1929), LCCN 29-5235
- Poodle-oodle of Doodle Farm, Lawton and Ruth Mackall, (Frederick A. Stokes, 1929)
- The Hound of Florence, translated by Huntley Paterson from the 1923 German by Felix Salten (Simon & Schuster, 1930)
- Young Fu of the Upper Yangtze, Elizabeth Foreman Lewis (Philadelphia, Chicago: John C. Winston Co., 1932)
- Silver Chief, Dog of the North, Jack O'Brien (Winston, 1933)
- The Story about Ping, Marjorie Flack (Viking Press, 1933)
- Farm Boy: A Hunt for Indian Treasure, Phil Stong (Doubleday, Doran and Co., 1934)
- Ho-Ming – Girl of New China, Elizabeth Lewis (Winston, 1934)
- Honk, the Moose, Phil Stong (Dodd, Mead and Co., 1935)
- Valiant, Dog Of The Timberline, Jack O'Brien (Grosset & Dunlap, 1935)
- The Untold Story of Exploration, Lowell Thomas (Dodd, Mead & Company, 1935)
- All the Mowgli Stories, Rudyard Kipling (Kipling Collection, Library of Congress; Doubleday, Doran, 1936)
- Sheep, Archer B. Gilfillan (Boston: Little, Brown and Co., 1936)
- Buddy the Bear ([Coward-McCann, Inc.] 1936)
- The Five Chinese Brothers, Claire Huchet Bishop (Coward-McCann, 1938)
- Yen-Foh A Chinese Boy, adapted from the Chinese by Ethel J. Eldridge (Chicago: Albert Whitman & Co., 1939)
- Saranga The Pygmy by Attilio Gatti, Hodder and Stoughton, London, 1939
- Pecos Bill and Lightning, Leigh Peck (Boston: Houghton Mifflin Co., 1940)
- With Love and Irony, Lin Yutang (John Day Company, 1940)
- The Ferryman, Claire Huchet Bishop (Coward-McCann, 1941)
- The Adventures of Monkey, adapted from the 1942 abridged translation by Arthur Waley from the Chinese of Wu Ch'eng-En (John Day, 1944)
- You Can Write Chinese, picture book created by Wiese (Viking, 1945) – a Caldecott Honor Book
- Censored, the Goat, Phil Stong (Dodd, Mead & Company, 1945)
- Twenty Thousand Leagues under the Sea, Jules Verne (Cleveland and New York: World Pub. Co., 1946)
- Li Lun, Lad of Courage, Carolyn Treffinger (Abingdon Press, 1947)
- Hoppity, Miriam E. Mason. (Macmillan, 1947)
- Daughter of the Mountains, Louise Rankin (Viking, 1948)
- Fish in the Air, picture book created by Wiese (Viking, 1948) – a Caldecott Honor Book
- The Fables of Aesop, Joseph Jacobs [1889] (Macmillan US, 1950)
- Happy Easter, picture book created by Wiese (Viking, 1952)
- All about Volcanoes and Earthquakes, Frederick H. Pough (Random House, 1953)
- Lions in the Barn, Virginia Frances Voight (Holiday House, 1955)
- Pika and the Roses, Elizabeth Coatsworth (Pantheon Books, 1959)
- Twenty-two Bears, Claire Huchet Bishop (Viking, 1964)
- The Truffle Pig, Claire Huchet Bishop (Coward, McCann & Geoghegan, 1971)

== See also ==
- Pictured Geography – picture books created by Marguerite Henry and Wiese (two sets of 8 published 1941 and 1946)
