= Endpaper =

Double-size sheet folded book paper

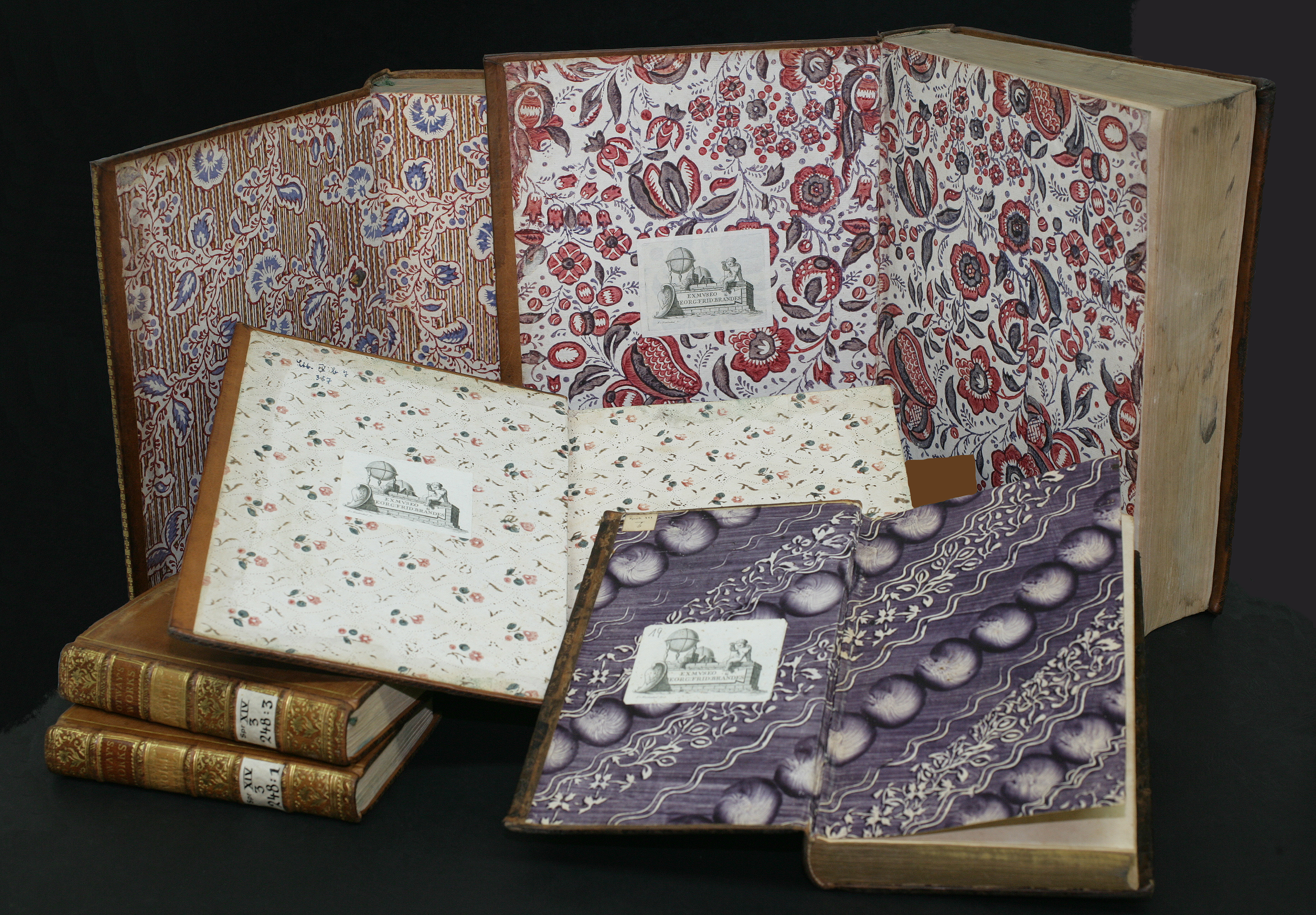
Different types of endpapers, Landesbibliothek Oldenburg (Germany).

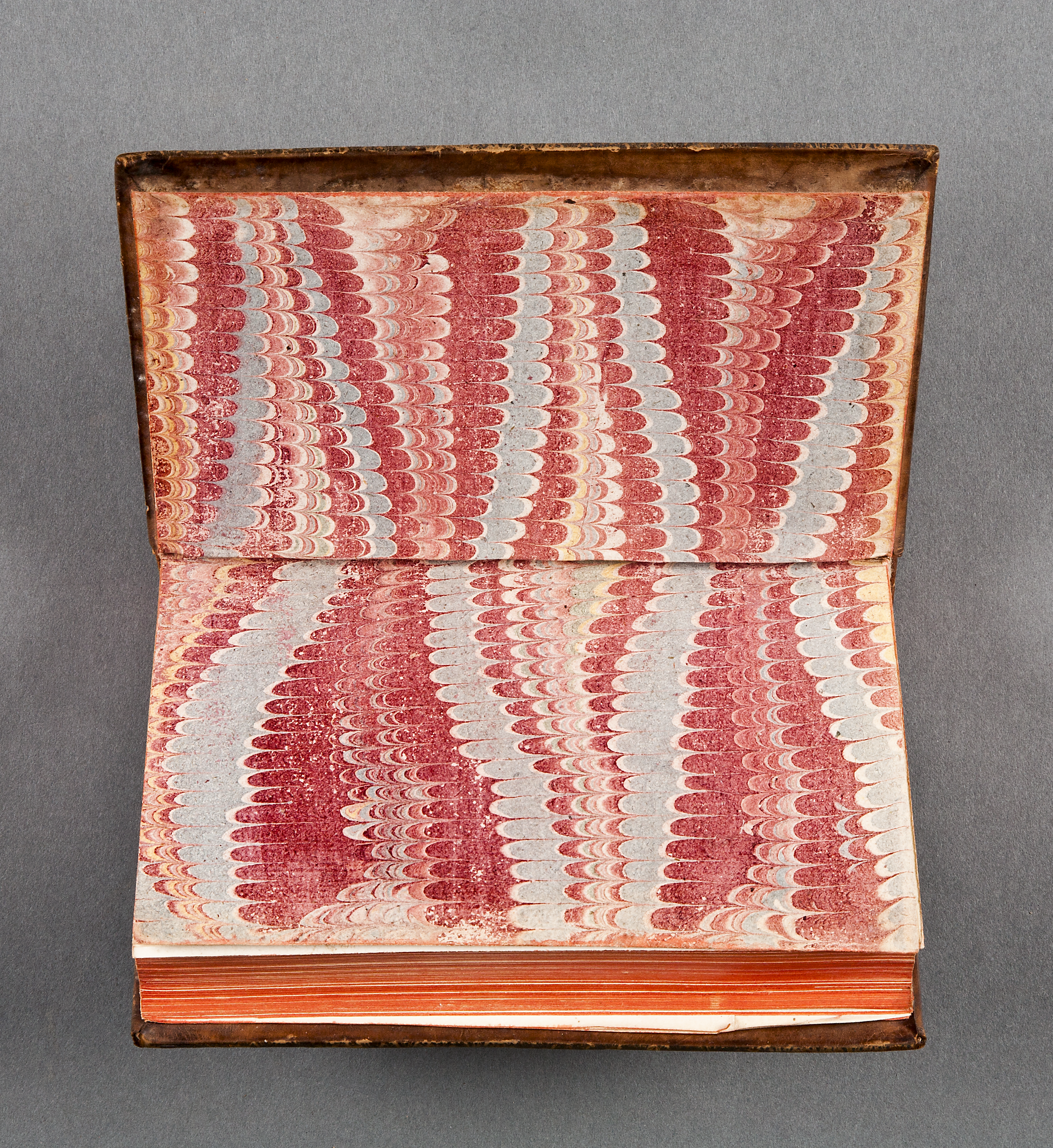
Stockholm 1777

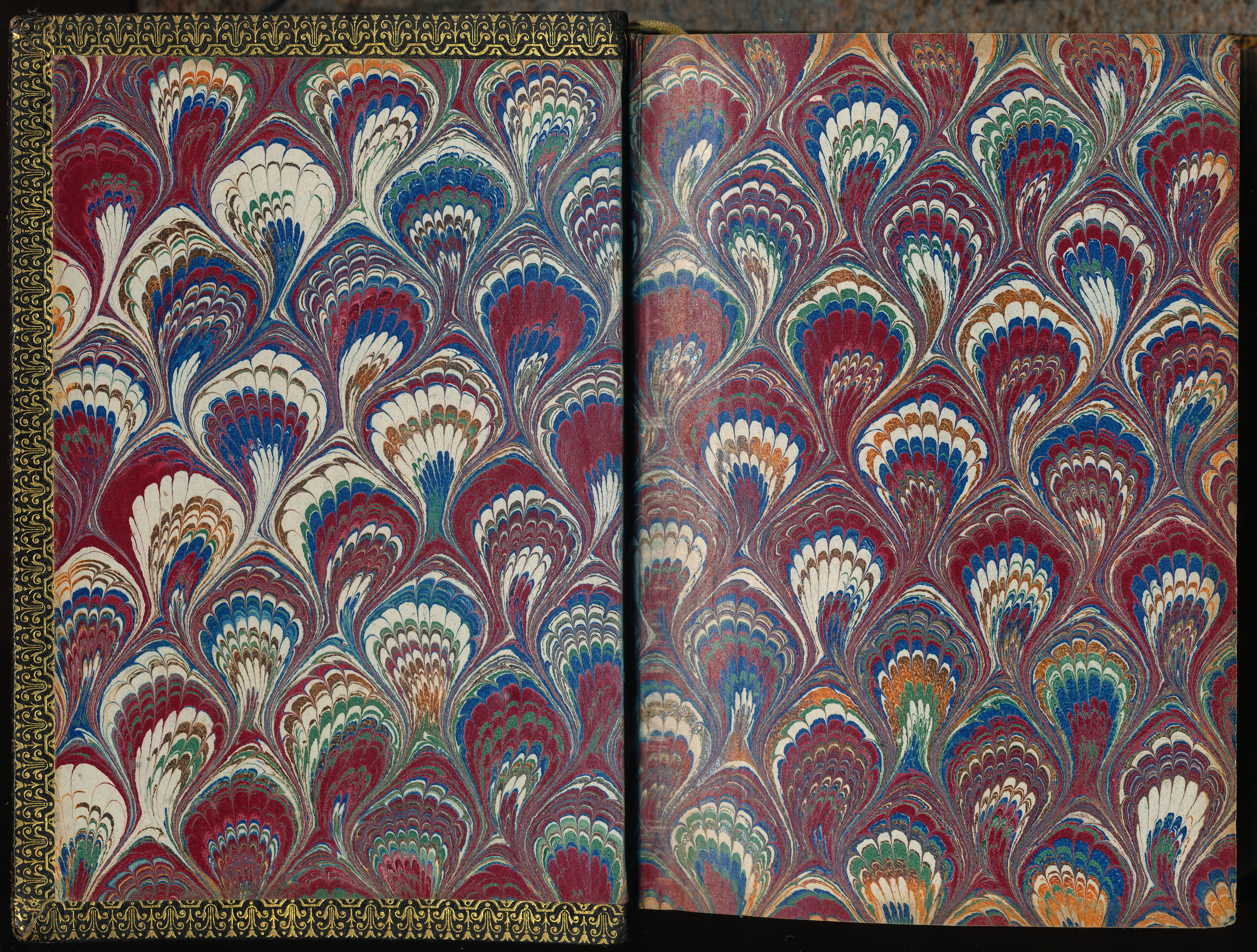
Marbled endpaper from Die Nachfolge Christi ed. Ludwig Donin (Vienna ca. 1875).

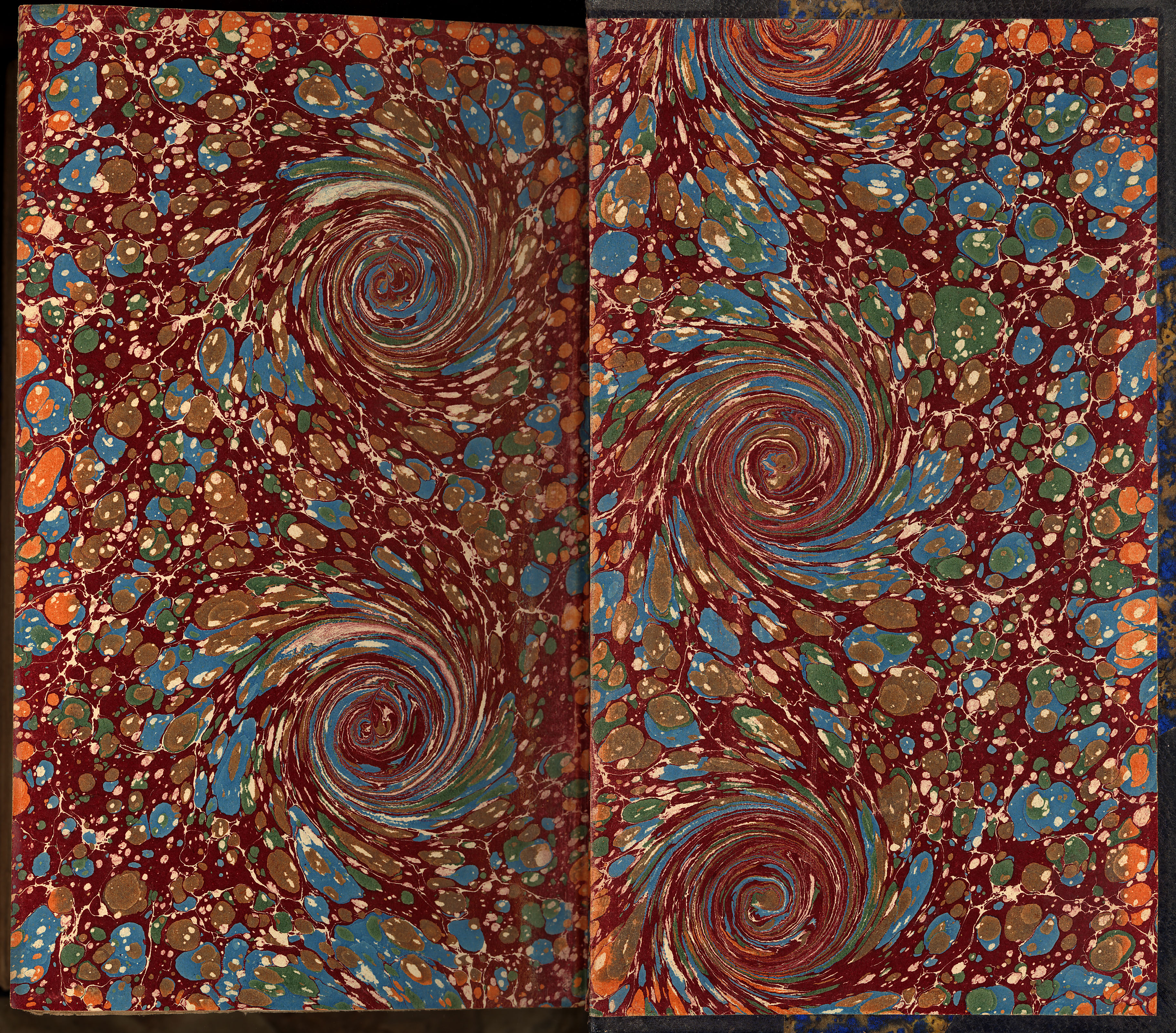
Handcrafted marbled endpapers of a book manually bound in France around 1880 (Giacomo Leopardi, Œuvres, vol. 2).

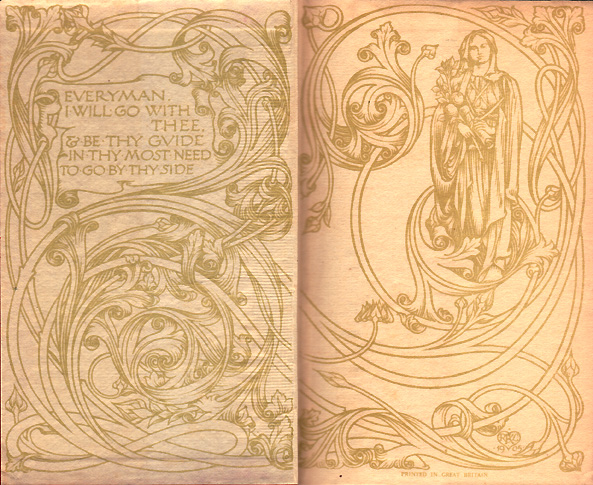
Endpapers of the original run of books in the Everyman's Library, 1906, based on the art of William Morris's Kelmscott Press.

The endpapers or end-papers of a book (also known as the endsheets) are the pages that consist of a double-size sheet folded, with one half pasted against an inside cover (the pastedown), and the other serving as the first free page (the free endpaper or flyleaf). Thus, the front endpapers precede the title page and the text, whereas the back endpapers follow the text. Booksellers sometimes refer to the front endpaper as FEP.

Before mass printing in the 20th century, it was common for the endpapers of books to have paper marbling. Sometimes the endpapers are used for maps or other relevant information. They are the traditional place to put bookplates, or an owner's inscription.

There are many styles of endsheets or endpapers that are specifically designed for use with different bindings. For example, endsheets reinforced with cloth are used in sewn bindings. The cloth holds the stitches and prevents the paper from perforating and tearing.

Other styles are designed for use with perfect binders. Combined and Universal Endsheets are loaded into the cover feeder of an automatic perfect binder and attached – instead of the soft cover – automatically, producing a book block reinforced from head to tail. The Folded Tabbed End sheet is collated with the text pages, milled and bound along with the book block.

There are also many styles of endpapers that are engineered to meet textbook standards and library binding standards, as well as endsheets for conservation and book repair.

== See also ==
- Bookbinding
- Book design
- Book cover
