= The Overlook Press =

New York based general interest publisher

- Parent company: Abrams Books
- Founded: 1971 (55 years ago)
- Founder: Peter Mayer
- Country of origin: United States
- Headquarters location: New York City
- Publication types: Books
- Imprints: Ardis, Duckworth
- Official website: abramsbooks.com

The Overlook Press is an American publishing house based in New York City that considers itself "a home for distinguished books that had been 'overlooked' by larger houses".

== History and operations ==
The Overlook Press was formed in 1971 by Peter Mayer, who had worked at Avon and Penguin Books, where he was chief executive officer from 1978 to 1998.

Overlook has more than one thousand titles in print, including fiction, history, biography, drama, and design. Their publishing program consists of nearly 100 new books per year, evenly divided between hardcovers and trade paperbacks. Imprints include Tusk Books, whose format was designed by Milton Glaser.

In 2002, Overlook acquired Ardis Publishing, a publisher of Russian literature in English. Overlook also took ownership of the British publishing company Gerald Duckworth and Company Ltd.

In 2007, Overlook's publisher Peter Mayer was the recipient of the New York Center for Independent Publishing's Poor Richard Award for outstanding contributions to independent book publishing.

Mayer died in 2018, and Abrams Books purchased The Overlook Press. Abrams is part of French publisher La Martinière Groupe and is distributed by Hachette Book Group.

=== Authors ===
Writers whose works were published by Overlook include:

- Elizabeth Abbott
- Edward Albee
- Katie Arnoldi
- Ken Auletta
- Paul Auster
- R. Scott Bakker
- Walter R. Brooks
- Paul Cartledge
- David Churbuck
- Robert Coover
- John Crowley
- David Crystal
- Charles Dickens
- R. J. Ellory
- Max Frei
- Milton Glaser
- W. F. Hermans
- Susan Hill
- P. F. Kluge
- Robert Littell
- Raymond Loewy
- David Mamet
- Charles McCarry
- Joseph McElroy
- Walter Moers
- Bárbara Mujica
- Jim Nisbet
- Mervyn Peake
- Tito Perdue
- Charles Portis
- John Cowper Powys
- Peter Quinn
- Joseph Roth
- Tarn Richardson
- Mikhail Saltykov-Shchedrin
- Ed Sanders
- André Schwarz-Bart
- Gerald Seymour
- Harry Sidebottom
- Alain Silver
- Nigel Slater
- Ludmila Ulitskaya
- Edgardo Vega Yunqué
- Penny Vincenzi
- Les Walker
- P. G. Wodehouse
- Richard Zimler
- Brad Gooch
- Robert Zorn

== See also ==
- List of English-language book publishing companies
