= Walter R. Brooks =

American writer (1886–1958)

- Born: January 9, 1886; Rome, New York, US
- Died: August 17, 1958 (aged 72); Roxbury, New York
- Occupation: Writer
- Writing career
- Genres: Short stories, children's novels
- Notable work: Mister Ed book series Freddy the Pig book series

Walter Rollin Brooks (January 9, 1886 – August 17, 1958) was an American writer, known for his children's books about Freddy the Pig and the other anthropomorphic animal inhabitants of the Bean Farm in upstate New York, and also for his short stories about Mister Ed the talking horse, made into a television series after his death.

== Biography ==
Brooks was born in Rome, New York. He attended college at the University of Rochester and subsequently studied homeopathic medicine in New York City. He dropped out after two years, however, and returned to Rochester where he married Anne Shepard in 1909. He found employment with an advertising agency in Utica, and then "retired" in 1911, evidently because he came into a considerable inheritance. His retirement was not permanent; in 1917, he went to work for the American Red Cross and he later did editorial work for several magazines, including "a nonfiction stint with The New Yorker 1932–1933". In 1940, he turned to writing for his full-time occupation. He married Dorothy Collins following the death of Anne in 1952.

The first works that Brooks published were poems and short stories. Among these were a series of short stories featuring "a talking horse and his drunken owner" which was the basis for the 1960s television comedy series Mister Ed. His most enduring works, however, are the 26 books that he wrote about Freddy the Pig and his friends. Anthony Boucher and J. Francis McComas praised Freddy and the Spaceship because it "offers wit, sound structural plotting, genuine character-humor, and admirable English prose".

Brooks died of a heart attack at his home in Roxbury, New York at age 72.

In 2009, Overlook Press published Talking Animals and Others: The Life and Work of Walter R. Brooks, Creator of Freddy the Pig by Michael Cart ISBN 1-59020-170-1.

== Works ==
=== Mister Ed stories ===
Nine of these stories were published in a collection, The Original Mr. Ed, in 1963. "Ed Signs the Pledge" was the story Arthur Lubin used to pitch the Mister Ed comedy series to TV executives.

- "The Talking Horse", Liberty, September 18, 1937
- "Horse Sense", Esquire, October 1938
- "Mr. Pope’s Thoroughbred", Liberty, June 10, 1939
- "Ed Has His Mind Improved", Liberty, October 14, 1939
- "Ed Shoots It Out", Liberty, June 1, 1940
- "The Midnight Ride of Mr. Pope", Liberty, August 3, 1940
- "Just a Song at Twilight", Liberty, September 21, 1940
- "Ed Holds a Séance", Liberty, March 1, 1941
- "Ed Likes to Be Beside the Seaside", Liberty, July 5, 1941
- "Ed Takes the Cockeyed Initiative", Liberty, September 27, 1941
- Ed Gets a Mother Complex, Liberty, November 8, 1941
- "Mr. Pope Rides Again", The Saturday Evening Post, July 4, 1942
- "Bird in the Bush", The Saturday Evening Post, September 5, 1942
- "Dr. Atwood and Mr. Ed", The Saturday Evening Post, January 16, 1943
- "Do Ye Ken Wilbur Pope?", The Saturday Evening Post, June 5, 1943
- "Ed Quenches an Old Flame", Argosy, May 1944
- "Ed Signs the Pledge", Argosy, June 1944
- "Ed Makes Like a Horse", Argosy, August 1944
- "Well, Really, Mr. Pope!", Argosy, October 1944
- "Ed the Were Horse" (a.k.a. "Monster in Horse’s Clothing"), Argosy, February 1945
- "Ed Goes Psychic" (a.k.a. "Such a Spiritous Horse!"), Argosy, April 1945
- "Ed Divides and Conquers", Argosy, July 1945
- "With Teeth and Tail", Argosy, September 1945
- "His Royal Harness", only in The Original Mr. Ed
- "Medium Rare", only in The Original Mr. Ed
