= 1932 in literature =

This article contains information about the literary events and publications of 1932.

== Events ==
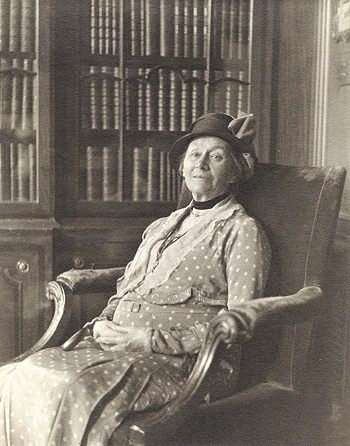
Alice Hargreaves in 1932, at the age of 80

- March – Captain W. E. Johns' character Biggles (James Bigglesworth) is introduced as an English World War I pilot in the short story "The White Fokker", in the first, April, issue of Popular Flying magazine, edited by Johns. The first Biggles collection, The Camels Are Coming, ensues in April.
- April 23 – To mark William Shakespeare's birthday:
  - The Royal Shakespeare Company's new theatre opens at Stratford-upon-Avon.
  - The Folger Shakespeare Library opens in Washington, D.C.
- April 26 – The 32-year-old American poet Hart Crane, in a state of alcoholic depression, throws himself overboard from the Orizaba between Mexico and New York; his body is never recovered.
- May – The first issue appears of the English journal of literary criticism Scrutiny: a quarterly review, edited by F. R. Leavis.
- June 28 – Alice Hargreaves, the inspiration for Alice's Adventures in Wonderland, meets the publisher Peter Llewelyn Davies, the inspiration for Peter Pan, at a Lewis Carroll centenary exhibition in a London bookshop.
- July – W. B. Yeats leases Riversdale house in the Dublin suburb of Rathfarnham and publishes Words for Music Perhaps, and Other Poems.
- Summer
  - The Open Air Theatre, Regent's Park, is established as a regular venue in London by Sydney Carroll and Robert Atkins.
  - The first performances at the Minack Theatre, an open-air venue on the coast of Cornwall (England), include The Tempest.
- October 3 – The Times newspaper of London introduces the Times New Roman typeface devised by Stanley Morison.
- October – Nineteen Irish writers led by Yeats and George Bernard Shaw form an Academy of Irish Letters that opposes the Censorship of Publications Board.
- November 16 – Compton Mackenzie is prosecuted under the Official Secrets Act in the U.K. for material in his Greek Memories.
- December
  - The issue of Weird Tales magazine with this month's cover date in the United States includes Robert E. Howard's short story "The Phoenix on the Sword", the first published appearance of Conan the Barbarian.
  - E. V. Knox replaces Sir Owen Seaman as editor of Punch magazine.
  - Shortly after publication, the first copies of Graham Greene's novel Stamboul Train, published by Heinemann in London, are withdrawn and the text altered after a threat of libel action by J. B. Priestley.
- unknown dates
  - Samuel Beckett's first novel, Dream of Fair to Middling Women, is written in Paris and rejected by several publishers.
  - Serialisation of the first three volumes of Mikhail Sholokhov's novel And Quiet Flows the Don («Тихий Дон») concludes in the Soviet magazine October.
  - The New Poetry (Thơ mới) period begins in Vietnamese literature, marked by an article and a poem from Phan Khôi.
  - Aussie: The Australian Soldiers' Magazine ceases publication.
  - Una Dillon founds Dillons Booksellers in London.

== New books ==
=== Fiction ===
- E. F. Benson – Secret Lives
- Gerald Tyrwhitt-Wilson, 14th Baron Berners (as Adela Quebec) – The Girls of Radcliff Hall (privately circulated roman à clef)
- Hermann Broch – The Sleepwalkers (third volume of the trilogy Die Schlafwandler)
- John Buchan – The Gap in the Curtain
- Pearl S. Buck – Sons
- Edgar Rice Burroughs – Tarzan Triumphant
- Erskine Caldwell – Tobacco Road
- John Dickson Carr
  - Poison in Jest
  - The Waxworks Murder
- Louis-Ferdinand Céline – Journey to the End of the Night (Voyage au bout de la nuit)
- Agatha Christie
  - Peril at End House
  - The Thirteen Problems
- Colette – The Pure and the Impure (Le Pur et l'impur)
- J.J. Connington – The Castleford Conundrum
- Freeman Wills Crofts
  - Death on the Way
  - Sudden Death
- A. J. Cronin – Three Loves
- Clemence Dane – Re-enter Sir John
- Catherine Isabella Dodd – Paul and Perdita
- John Dos Passos – 1919
- Hans Fallada – Little Man, What Now? (Kleiner Mann, was nun?)
- Joseph Jefferson Farjeon – The Z Murders
- William Faulkner – Light in August
- Elena Fortún – Celia en el colegio
- Gilbert Frankau – Christopher Strong
- Lewis Grassic Gibbon – Sunset Song
- Stella Gibbons – Cold Comfort Farm
- Anthony Gilbert
  - The Body on the Beam
  - The Long Shadow
- Jean Giono – Blue Boy
- Graham Greene – Stamboul Train
- Ernst Haffner – Blood Brothers (Blutsbrüder)
- Hermann Hesse – Journey to the East (Die Morgenlandfahrt)
- Soeman Hs – Mentjahari Pentjoeri Anak Perawan
- Aldous Huxley – Brave New World
- Francis Iles (Anthony Berkeley Cox) – Before the Fact
- Irmgard Keun – The Artificial Silk Girl (Das kunstseidene Mädchen)
- W. Somerset Maugham – The Narrow Corner
- Gladys Mitchell – The Saltmarsh Murders
- Nancy Mitford – Christmas Pudding
- Charles Morgan – The Fountain
- Vladimir Nabokov
  - Glory
  - Laughter in the Dark
- Beverley Nichols – Evensong
- Charles Nordhoff and James Norman Hall – Mutiny on the Bounty
- Max Nomad – Rebels and Renegades
- Seán Ó Faoláin – Midsummer Night Madness and Other Stories
- E. Phillips Oppenheim – The Ostrekoff Jewels
- Edith Philips – The Good Quaker in French Legend
- Anthony Powell – Venusberg
- John Cowper Powys – A Glastonbury Romance
- Ellery Queen
  - The Greek Coffin Mystery
  - The Egyptian Cross Mystery
- Sax Rohmer – The Mask of Fu Manchu
- Joseph Roth – Radetzky March (Radetzkymarsch)
- Damon Runyon – Guys and Dolls
- Rafael Sabatini – The Black Swan
- Dorothy L. Sayers – Have His Carcase
- Nevil Shute – Lonely Road
- Israel Joshua Singer – Yoshe Kalb
- J. Slauerhoff – Het verboden rijk (The Forbidden Kingdom, serial publication concludes and first book publication)
- Eleanor Smith – Ballerina
- Thorne Smith – Topper Takes a Trip
- Lesbia Soravilla – El dolor de-vivir
- John Steinbeck – The Pastures of Heaven
- Julia Strachey – Cheerful Weather for the Wedding
- Cecil Street – Dead Men at the Folly
- Thomas Sigismund Stribling – The Store
- Margareta Suber – Charlie
- Sigrid Undset
  - Burning Bush
  - The Son Avenger
- Maxence Van Der Meersch – The House on the Dune
- Henry Wade – The Hanging Captain
- Evelyn Waugh – Black Mischief
- Ethel Lina White – Fear Stalks the Village
- Charles Williams – The Greater Trumps
- Francis Brett Young – The House Under the Water

=== Children and young people ===
- Laura Adams Armer – Waterless Mountain
- W. E. Johns – The Camels Are Coming
- Erich Kästner – The 35th of May, or Conrad's Ride to the South Seas (Der 35. Mai)
- Arthur Ransome – Peter Duck
- Alison Uttley – Moonshine and Magic
- Laura Ingalls Wilder – Little House in the Big Woods
- Ruth Plumly Thompson – The Purple Prince of Oz (26th in the Oz series overall and the 12th written by her)

=== Drama ===
- S. N. Behrman – Biography
- Elias Canetti – Hochzeit (Wedding)
- Noël Coward – Design for Living (premiered 1933)
- Walter Hackett – Road House
- Ian Hay – Orders Are Orders
- Anthony Kimmins – While Parents Sleep
- Edward Knoblock – Evensong
- Ferdinand Kwasi Fiawoo – Toko Atolia
- George S. Kaufman and Edna Ferber – Dinner at Eight
- W. Somerset Maugham – For Services Rendered
- Harrison Owen – Doctor Pygmalion
- Theodore Pratt – The Big Blow
- Ahmed Shawqi – Amirat el-Andalus (The Andalusian Princess)
- John Van Druten
  - Behold, We Live
  - Somebody Knows
- Ödön von Horváth – Kasimir und Karoline
- Thornton Wilder – Lucrece

=== Poetry ===
- W. H. Auden – The Orators
- Hart Crane – The Broken Tower
- Cecil Day-Lewis – From Feathers To Iron
- An "Objectivist's" Anthology
- Boris Pasternak – The Second Birth

=== Non-fiction ===
- Adrian Bell – The Cherry Tree
- Henri Bergson – The Two Sources of Morality and Religion (Les deux sources de la morale et de la religion)
- Emil Brunner – The Divine Imperative: a study in Christian ethics (Gebot und die Ordnungen)
- F. J. Harvey Darton – The Story of English Children's Books in England: Five Centuries of Social Life
- Bernard DeVoto – Mark Twain's America
- T. S. Eliot – Selected Essays, 1917-1932
- Constantin Gane – Trecute vieți de doamne și domnițe (Bygone Lives of Queens and Princesses; first volume)
- J. B. S. Haldane – The Causes of Evolution
- Annabel Jackson – A Victorian Childhood
- Kepelino (died c. 1878) – Kepelino's Traditions of Hawaii (translation of Moolelo Hawaii, 1868)
- Hugh Kingsmill – Frank Harris
- F. R. Leavis – New Bearings in English Poetry
- Q. D. Leavis – Fiction and the Reading Public
- Beverley Nichols – Down the Garden Path
- Walter B. Pitkin – Life Begins at Forty
- Stith Thompson – Motif-Index of Folk-Literature (begins publication)
- E. C. Titchmarsh – The Theory of Functions
- Florence White – Good Things in England (food)
- S. Fowler Wright – The Life of Sir Walter Scott

== Births ==
- January 2 – Jean Little, Canadian children's fiction author (died 2020)
- January 5 – Umberto Eco, Italian novelist and semiotician (died 2016)
- January 18 – Robert Anton Wilson, American novelist and playwright (died 2007)
- January 19 – George MacBeth, Scottish poet and novelist (died 1992)
- February 7 – Gay Talese, American literary journalist
- February 9 – Roderick Cook, English actor and playwright (died 1990)
- February 14 – Alexander Kluge, German writer, philosopher, and film director (died 2026)
- February 15 – Troy Kennedy Martin, Scottish scriptwriter (died 2009)
- February 16 – Aharon Appelfeld, Israeli novelist and poet (died 2018)
- February 20 – Adrian Cristobal, Filipino journalist, playwright and author (died 2007)
- March 4 – Ryszard Kapuściński, Polish journalist poet and travel writer (died 2007)
- March 18 – John Updike, American novelist and poet (died 2009)
- March 31 – John Jakes, American historical novelist (died 2023)
- April 5
  - Bora Ćosić, Yugoslav-born Croatian-German writer
  - Fănuș Neagu, Romanian novelist, journalist, and short story writer (died 2011)
- April 8 – Joan Lingard, Scottish novelist (died 2022)
- April 10 – Adrian Henri, English poet (died 2000)
- April 13 – Barney Simon, South African writer, playwright and director (died 1995)
- May 7 – Jenny Joseph, English poet (died 2018)
- May 24 – Arnold Wesker, English dramatist (died 2016)
- June 5 – Christy Brown, Irish autobiographer and poet (died 1981)
- June 6 – Sara Banerji, English author and sculptor
- June 11 – Athol Fugard, South African playwright and novelist (died 2025)
- June 18 – Geoffrey Hill, English poet (died 2016)
- July 17 – Karla Kuskin, American children's writer and illustrator (died 2009)
- July 18 – Yevgeny Yevtushenko, Russian poet and writer (died 2017)
- July 22 – Tom Robbins, American novelist (died 2025)
- August 16 – Christopher Okigbo, Nigerian poet (died 1967)
- August 17 – V. S. Naipaul, Trinidad-born novelist (died 2018)
- August 27 – Antonia Fraser, English biographer, novelist and historian
- September 7 – Malcolm Bradbury, English novelist (died 2000)
- September 9 – Alice Thomas Ellis, English novelist, essayist and cookery book author (died 2005)
- October 24 – Adrian Mitchell, English poet, playwright and fiction writer (died 2008)
- October 27 – Sylvia Plath, American poet (suicide 1963)
- October 31 – Katherine Paterson, Chinese-American author
- December 5 – Jacques Roubaud, French poet, writer, and mathematician (died 2024)

== Deaths ==
- January 6 – Iacob Negruzzi, Romanian poet, columnist and memoirist (born 1842)
- January 12 – Ella Hepworth Dixon, English writer, novelist and editor (born 1857)
- January 21 – Lytton Strachey, English biographer (cancer, born 1880)
- January 28 – F. M. Mayor, English novelist (born 1872)
- February 4 – Mona Caird, English novelist, essayist and feminist (born 1854)
- February 10 – Edgar Wallace, English crime writer (diabetes, born 1875)
- February 15 – Minnie Maddern Fiske, American actress and playwright (born 1865)
- March 16 – Harold Monro, British poet and poetry bookshop proprietor (alcohol-related, born 1879)
- April 20 – Giuseppe Peano, Italian mathematician and philosopher (born 1858)
- April 22 – Ferenc Oslay, Hungarian-Slovene historian, writer and irredenta (born 1883)
- April 23
  - Evelyn Everett-Green, English novelist and children's writer (born 1856)
  - Laura Kieler, Norwegian novelist and dramatic inspiration (born 1849)
- April 27 – Hart Crane, American poet (suicide, born 1899)
- May 22 – Augusta, Lady Gregory, Irish dramatist (born 1852)
- June 17 – Sir John Quick, Australian politician and author (born 1852)
- July 6 – Kenneth Grahame, Scottish-born children's and short-story writer (born 1859)
- July 20 – René Bazin, French novelist (born 1853)
- July 22 – J. Meade Falkner, English novelist and poet (born 1858)
- July 23 – Emma Pow Bauder, American novelist, evangelist, missionary, and reformer (born 1848)
- August 29 – Raymond Knister, Canadian writer (drowned, born 1899)
- August 30 – Emma Wolf, American novelist (born 1865)
- September 5 – Paul Bern, German-American screenwriter (suicide, born 1889)
- September 24 – Rose Combe, French writer and railway worker (born 1883)
- October 5 – Christopher Brennan, Australian poet (born 1870)
- October 14 – Ahmed Shawqi, Egyptian poet (born 1868)
- November 11 – Georgina Fraser Newhall, Canadian author (b. 1860)
- November 13 – Catherine Isabella Dodd, English education writer and novelist (born 1860)
- November 15 – Charles W. Chesnutt, American writer (born 1858)
- November 23 – Henry S. Whitehead, American genre novelist (gastric ailment, born 1882)
- date unknown — Hester M. Poole, American writer, poet, art critic (born 1833/34)

== Awards ==
- James Tait Black Memorial Prize for fiction: Helen de Guerry Simpson, Boomerang
- James Tait Black Memorial Prize for biography: Stephen Gwynn, The Life of Mary Kingsley
- Newbery Medal for children's literature: Laura Adams Armer, Waterless Mountain
- Nobel Prize in Literature: John Galsworthy
- Prix Goncourt: Guy Mazeline, Les Loups
- Pulitzer Prize for Drama: George S. Kaufman, Morrie Ryskind, Ira Gershwin, Of Thee I Sing
- Pulitzer Prize for Poetry: George Dillon, The Flowering Stone
- Pulitzer Prize for the Novel: Pearl S. Buck, The Good Earth
