= Anne Brigman =

American photographer (1869–1950)

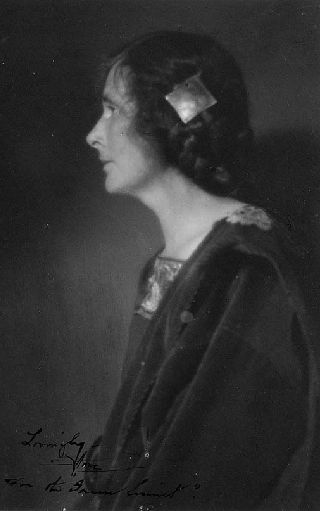
- Self-portrait of Anne Brigman (1919)
- Born: Anne Wardrope Nott; December 3, 1869; Nu‘uanu Pali, Hawaii, U.S.
- Died: February 8, 1950 (aged 80); El Monte, California, U.S.
- Spouse: Martin Brigman (m. 1894–1910)

Anne Wardrope Brigman (née Nott; December 3, 1869 – February 8, 1950) was an American photographer and one of the original members of the Photo-Secession movement in America.

Her most famous images were taken between 1900 and 1920 and depict nude women in primordial, naturalistic contexts.

== Life ==
Brigman was born in the Nu‘uanu Pali above Honolulu, Hawaii, on December 3, 1869. She was the oldest of eight children born to Mary Ellen Andrews Nott, whose parents moved to Hawaii as missionaries in 1828. Her father, Samuel Nott, was from Gloucester, England. When she was sixteen, her family moved to Los Gatos, California, and nothing is known about why they moved or what they did after arriving in California. In 1894 she married a sea captain, Martin Brigman. She accompanied her husband on several voyages to the South Seas, returning to Hawaii at least once.

Imogen Cunningham recounts a story supposedly told to her firsthand that on one of the voyages, Brigman fell and injured herself so severely that one breast was removed. This story was never confirmed by Brigman or anyone else, but by 1900 Brigman stopped traveling with her husband and resided in Oakland, California.

The couple separated before 1910, and she lived in a cabin on Thirty-Second Street with her dog Rory, a dozen tamed birds, and occasionally with her mother. She was active in the growing bohemian community of the San Francisco Bay Area and became close friends with the Oakland writer Jack London and the Berkeley poet and naturalist Charles Keeler. Perhaps seeking her own artistic outlet, she began photographing in 1901. Soon she was exhibiting and, within two years, she had developed a reputation as a master of pictorial photography. The first public display of her work came in January 1902 with other members of the California Camera Club at San Francisco's Second Photographic Salon in the Mark Hopkins Institute of Art. Her Portrait of Mr. Morrow was singled out in the press and was reproduced in the popular monthly Camera Craft. That journal praised her photos at the Los Angeles Salon of 1902 and reproduced over a dozen of her prints over the next decade. She used a shared darkroom (a converted barn) on Oakland's Brockhurst Street.

Brigman's career quickly accelerated at home. After her success at San Francisco's Third Photographic Salon (1903), she opened a teaching studio in Berkeley, which attracted many university students. Soon her allegorical studies appeared in Photograms of the Year, and her portraits of California celebrities, such as the rakish Herman Whitaker, were featured in two issues of Sunset magazine. A partial list of her California exhibitions, which were reviewed extensively in the press between 1904 and 1908, includes the: Fourth and Fifth Annual Exhibitions of the Oakland Art Fund sponsored by the Starr King Fraternity; Palette, Lyre and Pen Club of Oakland (solo exhibit); Vickery, Atkins & Torrey Gallery in San Francisco (solo exhibit); Arts and Crafts Exhibition in Los Angeles; Paul Elder Gallery in San Francisco (solo exhibit); California Guild of Arts and Crafts in San Francisco; Oakland Club Room (solo show); First and Second Annuals of the Berkeley Art Association; Alameda County Exposition in Oakland's Idora Park; Ebell Clubhouse in Oakland; and Del Monte Art Gallery in Monterey.

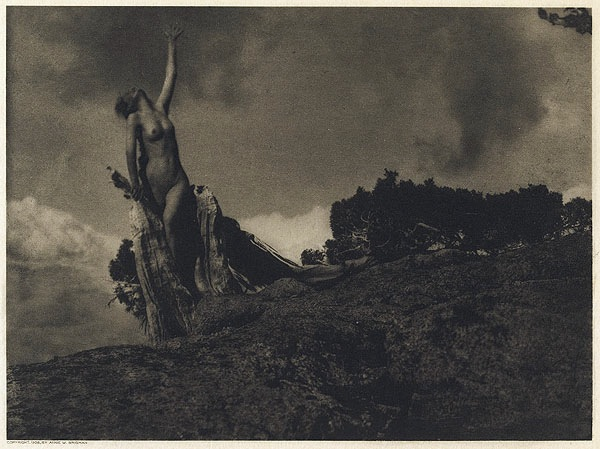
Soul of the Blasted Pine, a self-portrait of Anne Brigman taken in 1908

She often lectured, and on one occasion, in October 1906, she summarized her philosophy on the Art of Photography at a well-attended event for Berkeley's Town and Gown Club. Her celebrity status was confirmed in July 1907 when Emily J. Hamilton assessed Brigman and many of her famous photographs in a full-page Sunday magazine article for the San Francisco Call entitled “Lens Studies of a Photo-Secessionist.” In 1907, Brigman completed eight illustrations for William E. Henley's poem I Am the Captain of My Soul. Her “artists’ teas” in Oakland and Berkeley became occasions when the Bay Area's famous painters, literati, and actors mingled; among the prominent local photographers habitually in attendance were Oscar Maurer, Laura Adams Armer, Emily H. Pitchford, Adelaide Hanscom Leeson, and Oscar V. Lange. Her popularity with the public was slightly tarnished when her famous study of an undraped female nude, The Soul of the Blasted Pine, was criticized, sidelined, and removed from the 1908 Idora Park Exposition for being an indecent photograph of a "scrawny dame." Brigman angrily withdrew the image from the display.

Brigman quickly gained recognition outside of California. In late 1902, she came across a copy of Camera Work and was captivated by the images and writings of Alfred Stieglitz. She wrote Stieglitz praising him for the journal, and Stieglitz soon became captivated with Brigman's photography. In 1903 she was listed as an Associate of his famous Photo-Secession, and two years later, he listed her as an official Member. In 1908 she became a Fellow of the Photo-Secession. Because of Stieglitz's notoriously high standards and because of her distance from the other members in New York, this recognition is a significant indicator of her artistic status. She was the only photographer west of the Mississippi to be so honored. From 1903 to 1908, Stieglitz exhibited Brigman's photos many times, and her photos were printed in three issues of Stieglitz's journal Camera Work. During this same period, she often exhibited and corresponded under the name “Annie Brigman,” but in 1911, she dropped the “i” and was known from then on as “Anne.” In 1908 the Secession Club held a special exhibit for her photographs in New York.

Admiration of her talents quickly spread. The Carnegie Institute in Pittsburgh and the Corcoran Art Gallery in Washington, D.C. staged in 1904 one-person exhibitions of her work. In 1905 her photo entitled The Vigil was shown at the London Salon. She was elected to membership in the British art photographers’ “Linked Ring” and exhibited two “dramatically poetic prints” at its Salon of 1908. Her photograph entitled The Kodak–A Decorative Study was the prize winner selected for the cover of the 1908 Kodak catalogue. Brigman's The Moon Cave and many other photos were shown at the Worcester Art Museum's Fourth Annual Exhibition of Photographs. In 1909 she won a gold medal in the Alaska-Yukon Exposition as well as awards in Europe. She continued to exhibit for many years and was included in the landmark International Exhibition at the Albright–Knox Art Gallery in New York in 1911.

In California, she became revered by West Coast photographers, and her photography influenced many of her contemporaries. She was also known as an actress, and in 1908 she played Sybil of Nepenthe in two performances of a play by Charles Keeler presented by the Studio Club of Berkeley in the Hillside Clubhouse; Brigman even served as a “judge” in a baby beauty contest. She performed as a poet her work and more popular pieces such as "Enoch Arden". An admirer of the work of George Wharton James, she photographed him on at least one occasion. In 1915 she worked with Francis Bruguiere on the Panama Pacific International Exposition photography exhibition.

In June 1913, Brigman was the subject of a feature article and extensive interview in the San Francisco Call, where she offered revealing insights on the liberation of women in a male-dominated society. That September, she completed the illustration for the title page of the first book published by the California Writers’ Club, West Winds, which also included art by Maynard Dixon, Alice Best, George Kegg, and Perham Wilhelm Nahl. In August 1921, she held a solo exhibition at the Gump's Gallery in San Francisco and two months later contributed to the First Annual Oakland Photographic Salon. In the spring of 1922, she exhibited the work of eight other photographers in her Oakland studio; that fall, in the San Francisco studio of Dorothea Lange, she was a featured speaker at a symposium on the problems of pictorial photography. Between 1923 and 1926 she displayed her “imaginative nudes” at the International Exhibitions of the Pictorial Photographic Society of San Francisco in the Palace of Fine Arts and the Palace of the Legion of Honor. In her review for the Berkeley Daily Gazette of that Society's Second International Exhibition, the artist Jennie V. Cannon attacked those who claimed that photography was not “art” and said of Brigman that “the individuality of the works comes out quite as noticeably as in painting, sculpture and etching.”

Between 1908 and the mid-1920s Brigman frequently vacationed in Carmel-by-the-Sea, California, where she exhibited her photos at several seaside salons. She began to study etching in Carmel under James Blanding Sloan and exhibited her prints “of fine design and feeling” in April 1925 with other Sloan students at the League of Fine Arts in Berkeley and at the City of Paris Galleries in San Francisco. In August 1926, her photos were paired with the block prints of William S. Rice in a show at Morcom's Gallery in Oakland. The following March, she exhibited her photographs at the Fine Arts Society of San Diego. In the summer of 1928, she made the first of several lengthy trips to Covina in southern California. The following March, she submitted a photograph of “figures in a somber dance” to the Exhibition of Dance Art at San Francisco's East-West Gallery.

In 1929, she moved to Long Beach, California, where she lived alone in several apartments near the ocean. She found inspiration along the picturesque shorelines of the Pacific and held a major solo exhibition at the Bothwell and Cooke Galleries in January 1936; the Los Angeles Times singled out Wings, Design and El Dolor as her “choicest” photographs. In 1940 she lived in Los Angeles and gave her occupation as “writer”. Within three years, Brigman had returned to Long Beach, where she was a member of the Poets’ Guild and the Writers’ Market League. At the latter, she read her narrative Deepwater Ships that Pass.

Declining vision led her to abandon professional freelance photography in 1930, although she continued photography through the 1940s. Her work evolved from a pure pictorial style to more of a straight photography approach, although she never really abandoned her original vision. Her later close-up photos of sandy beaches and vegetation are near-abstractions in black and white. In the mid-1930s, she also began taking creative writing classes and writing poetry. Encouraged by her writing instructor, she put together a book of poems and photographs called Songs of a Pagan. She found a publisher for the book in 1941, but because of World War II, the book was not printed until 1949, the year before she died. Brigman created an additional volume of photographs and poems for her publisher (Caxton Printers, Ltd.) called Wild Flute Songs. It was not printed in her lifetime and has only recently become available.

Brigman died at 80 on February 8, 1950, at her sister's El Monte, California, home.

== Photography ==
Brigman's photographs frequently focused on the female nude, dramatically situated in natural landscapes or trees. Many of her photos were taken in the Sierra Nevada in carefully selected locations and featuring elaborately staged poses. Brigman often featured herself as the subject of her images, such as Soul of the Blasted Pine, for which she received the Birmingham Photographic Society's first silver medal. Many of her other photos used her sister as the nude model. After shooting the photographs, she would extensively touch up the negatives with paints, pencil, or superimposition.

== Gallery ==
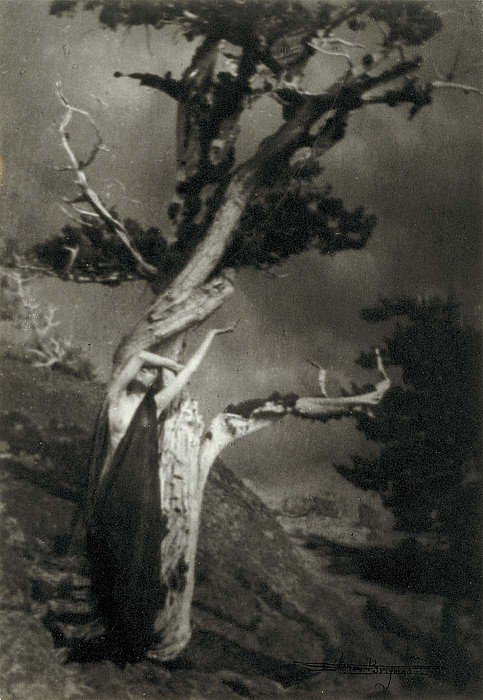
The Dying Cedar, 1906

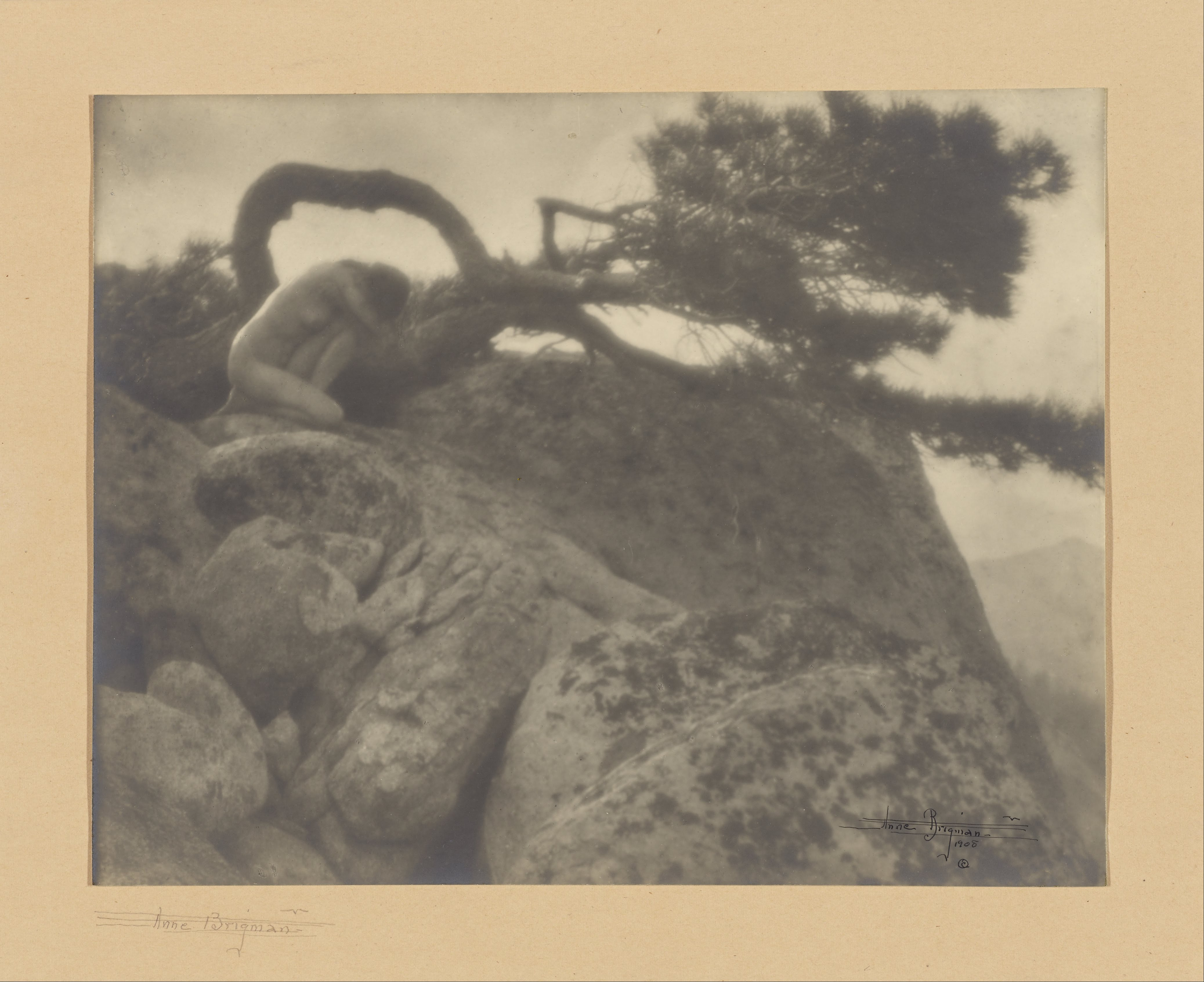
The Lone Pine, 1908

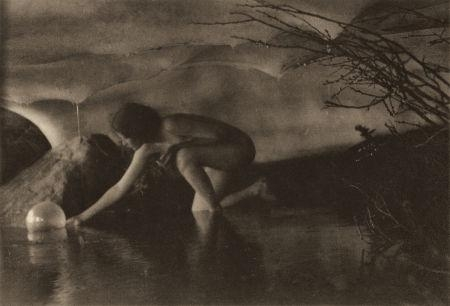
The Bubble, 1909

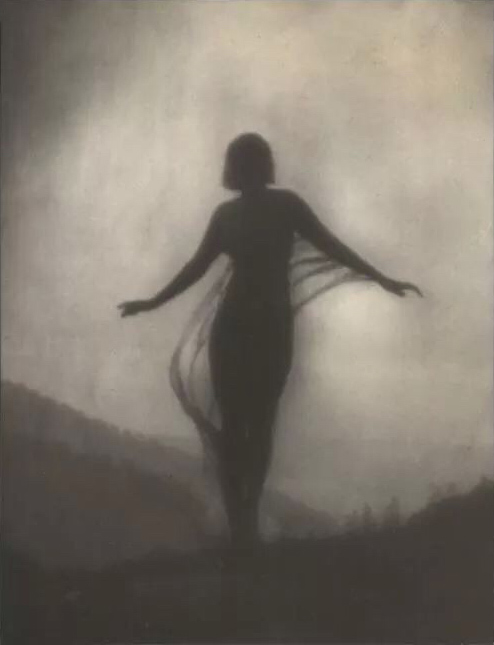
The Breeze, 1910

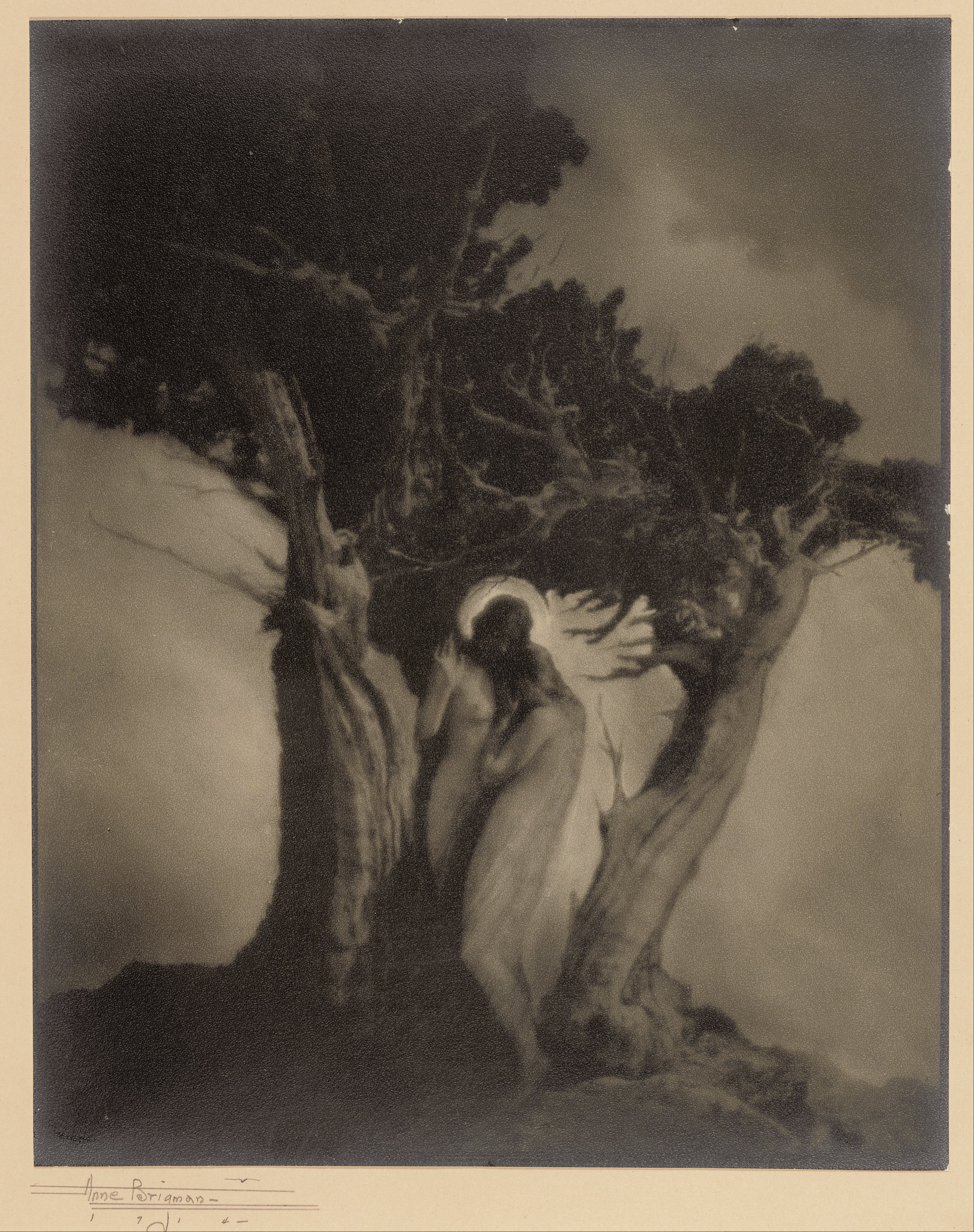
The Heart of the Storm, 1914

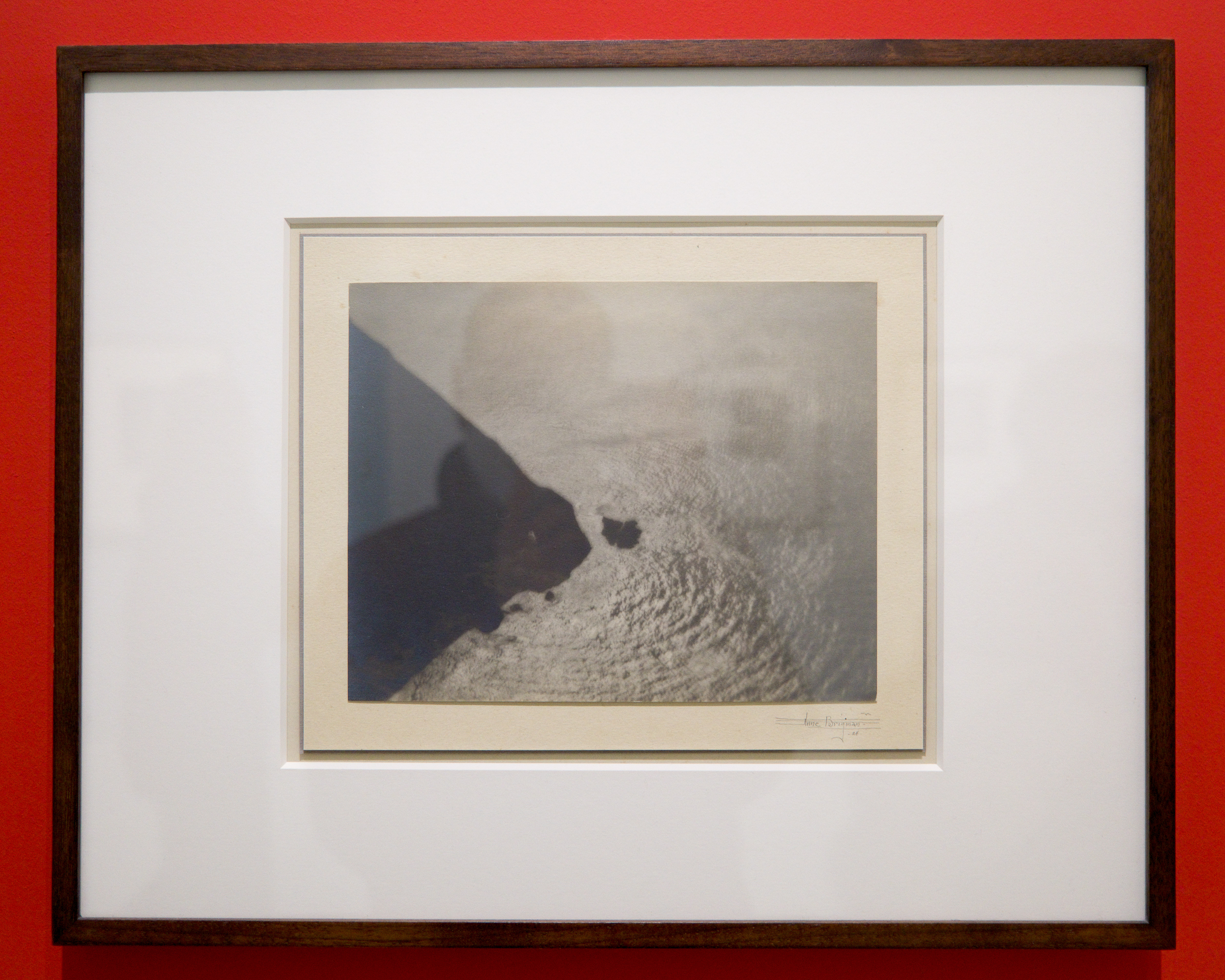
A Study in Radiation [Carmel-by-the-Sea, California], 1924. The Museum of Modern Art, New York. Thomas Walther Collection.

== See also ==
- Pictorialism
- California Tonalism
- Modernism
- Impressionism
