= Oscar Lange =

Oscar Lange is the name of:

- Oscar V. Lange, US photographer
- Oskar R. Lange, Polish economist and diplomat
