= Speedy in Oz =

1934 book by Ruth Plumly Thompson

- Cover of Speedy in Oz.
- Author: Ruth Plumly Thompson
- Illustrator: John R. Neill
- Language: English
- Series: The Oz Books
- Genre: Children's novel
- Publisher: Reilly & Lee
- Publication date: 1934
- Publication place: United States
- Media type: Print (Hardcover)
- Pages: 298
- Preceded by: Ojo in Oz
- Followed by: The Wishing Horse of Oz

Speedy in Oz (1934) is the twenty-eighth book in the Oz series created by L. Frank Baum and his successors, and the fourteenth written by Ruth Plumly Thompson. It was illustrated by John R. Neill. The novel was followed by The Wishing Horse of Oz (1935).

This book features yet another island which floats in the sky: Umbrella Island, which flies by virtue of a huge umbrella with lifting and shielding powers. The king is not very good at steering the flying island; he bumps it into a giant's head. For compensation, Loxo, the great brute, demands the King's daughter Gureeda, whom he mistakes for a boy, as a servant to lace his huge boots. However, he grants the Umbrella Islanders three months to train the child to be a bootlacer.

Meanwhile, the boy Speedy (from The Yellow Knight of Oz) returns for another adventure. While inspecting a dinosaur skeleton, Speedy is blown by a geyser into the air. The skeleton comes magically to life and becomes Terrybubble, a live dinosaur skeleton. Terrybubble and Speedy land on Umbrella Island. Speedy develops a friendship with Princess Gureeda. He also becomes friendly with the island's resident wizard, Waddy. An unscrupulous minister, however, notices that Speedy and Gureeda look very much alike and could pass for fraternal twins. He hatches a plot to compensate the giant by handing Speedy over to him as a slave instead of Gureeda. Terrybubble learns of this plot, and he parachutes off the island with Speedy and Gureeda. All three are captured by Loxo, and it is up to the wizard Waddy to save them.

Aside from a brief consultation with Princess Ozma and her advisers at the conclusion, the book deals exclusively with characters of Thompson's creation.

== Reception ==
The Billings Gazette said that the book offers "rollicking fun and quaking amazement for the under 12s," lauding it as a "book of glorified nonsense". The Boston Globe called it an "entrancing story".

== Copyright status ==
Under current United States copyright laws, Speedy in Oz is scheduled to enter the public domain on January 1, 2030. This will be Thompson's final Oz book published in the 1930s to have its copyright expire as all others published during the decade, ending with Ozoplaning with the Wizard of Oz, had their copyrights expire when they were not renewed during the 1960s. Thompsons' later Oz books, Yankee in Oz (1972) and The Enchanted Island of Oz (1976) will still be in copyright.

The Oz books
Previous book: Ojo in Oz	Speedy in Oz; 1934	Next book: The Wishing Horse of Oz
