= Loxo =

Loxo may refer to:

- Loxo (nymph), one of the nymphs of archery in Greek mythology
- Loxo, a character in the 1934 novel Speedy in Oz
- Loxo (Dungeons & Dragons), a fictional monster in roleplaying games
- Loxo (bivalve), an extinct genus of clams in the family Veneridae
