= Emily Pitchford =

American photographer (1878–1956)

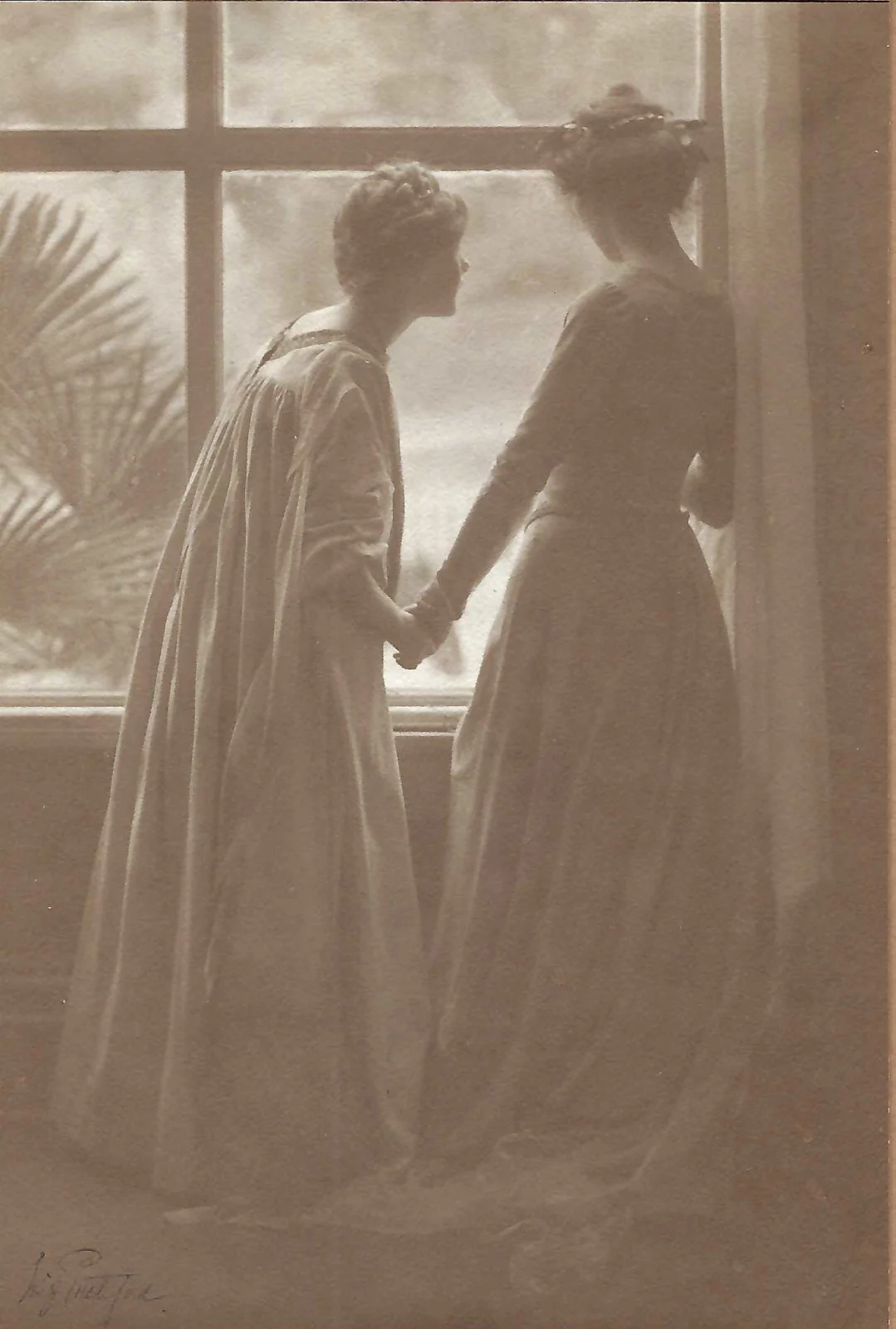
Suspense by Emily Pitchford, 1908

Emily H. Pitchford (1878–1956) was an American photographer.

Emily H. Pitchford was born in 1878 in Gold Hill, Nevada. She attended the Mark Hopkins Institute of Art, now called the San Francisco Art Institute, in the 1890s.

Pitchford won a bronze medal at the Alaska–Yukon–Pacific Exposition in 1909.

She had a studio with Adelaide Hanscom Leeson in the early 20th century and shared one with Laura Adams Armer in Berkeley, California, as of 1902. As of 1906, she had her own studio in Berkeley. Historian Shelley Rideout describes Pitchford, Leeson, and Armer as pictorialists.

Pitchford married William Leo Hussey, a mining engineer, on June 10, 1911, in Johannesburg. They remained in South Africa until 1921 and then came back to Berkeley. She died in Berkeley in 1956.

== Sources ==
- Johnson, Drew Heath, ed. (2001). Capturing Light: Masterpieces of California Photography, 1850 to the Present. Oakland Museum of California; W. W. Norton & Company. ISBN 0-393-04993-0. OCLC 44446663.
