= The Forest Pool =

1938 Picture book

- Author: Laura Adams Armer
- Publication date: 1938
- Pages: unpaged
- Awards: Caldecott Honor

The Forest Pool is a 1938 picture book by Laura Adams Armer. The book was a recipient of a 1939 Caldecott Honor for its illustrations.
