= Christopher Strong =

1933 film

- Original theatrical poster
- Directed by: Dorothy Arzner
- Screenplay by: Zoë Akins
- Based on: Christopher Strong; 1932 novel by Gilbert Frankau
- Produced by: David O. Selznick
- Starring: Katharine Hepburn; Colin Clive; Billie Burke; Ralph Forbes; Helen Chandler; Irene Browne
- Cinematography: Bert Glennon
- Edited by: Arthur Roberts
- Music by: Roy Webb
- Production company: RKO Radio Pictures
- Distributed by: RKO Radio Pictures (US)
- Release dates: March 31, 1933 (US); June 29, 1933 (UK)
- Running time: 78 minutes
- Country: United States
- Language: English
- Budget: $284,000 (estimated)

Christopher Strong (also known as The Great Desire and The White Moth) is a 1933 American pre-Code romantic drama film produced by RKO and directed by Dorothy Arzner. It is a tale of illicit love among the English aristocracy and stars Colin Clive and Katharine Hepburn (in her second screen role and first starring role). The screenplay by Zoë Akins is an adaptation of the 1932 British novel Christopher Strong by Gilbert Frankau.

== Plot ==
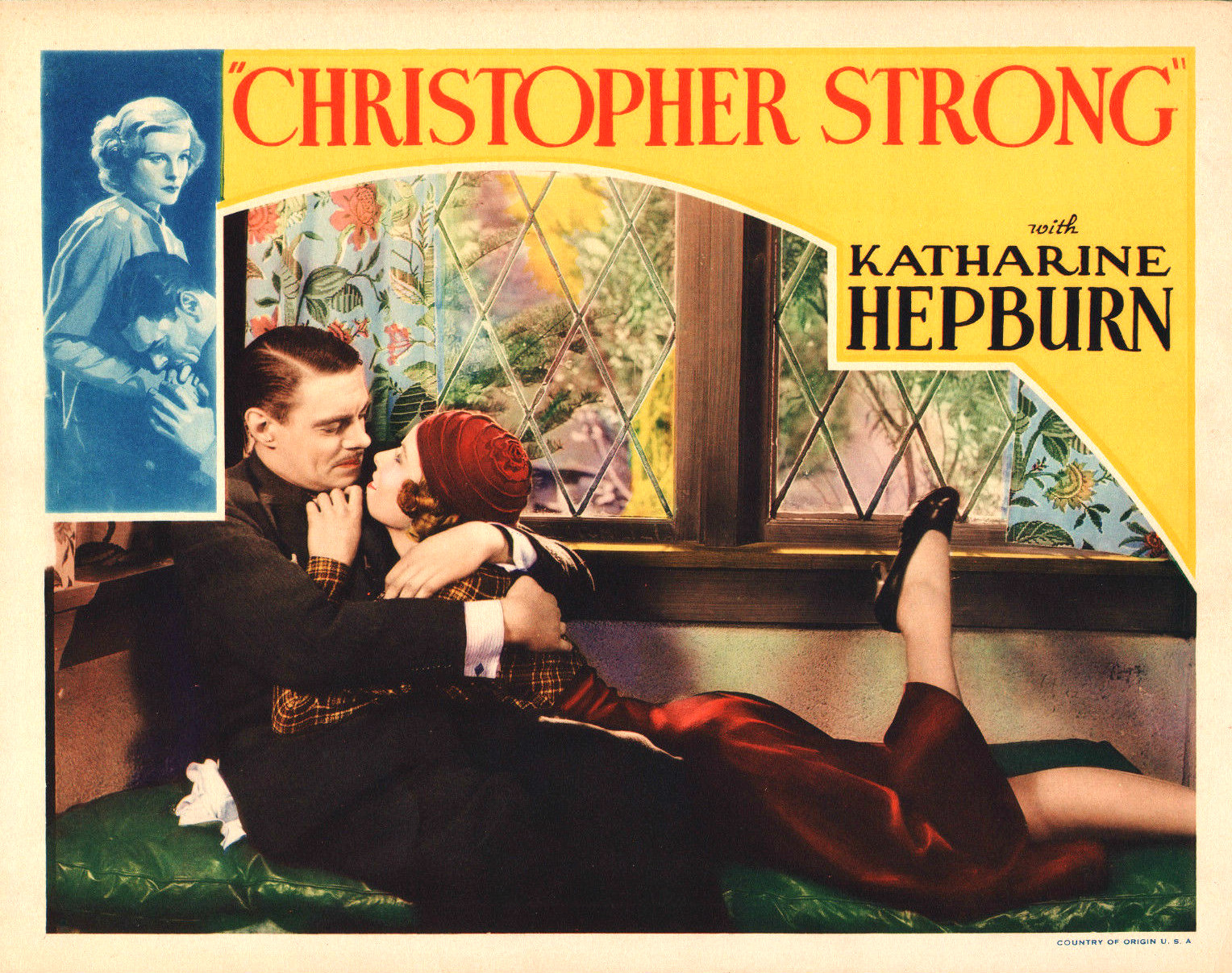
Lobby card for Christopher Strong

In London, Monica Strong and her married lover, Harry Rawlinson, attend a scavenger hunt party given by Monica's aunt, Carrie Valentine. Carrie announces a tie-breaking challenge: Women must find a man married more than 5 years and faithful, and men must find a woman over 20 who has never had a love affair.

Monica departs to find her father, Sir Christopher Strong, who is devoted to her mother. Harry follows on a motorbike and crashes. Lady Cynthia Darrington, a famous aviator, helps him, and goes along: She has never had a love affair and is a great deal older than 20. At the party, Cynthia meets Christopher, a friend of her late father. She takes him flying.

Cynthia and Monica become friends. Lady Elaine Strong, fears the friendship growing between Cynthia and Christopher, who insists that she is a good influence on their daughter.

Monica comes home with Harry one night, drunk, and Elaine tells him that if he is an honourable man he won't see her daughter again. Harry agrees. Christopher asks Cynthia to persuade Monica to go with the family to Cannes. Monica agrees, if Christopher takes her to see Cynthia in an aerial show. At their villa, Elaine anticipates having a whole month alone with her husband. A telegram arrives: They have persuaded Cynthia to join them. Elaine is crushed.

Two weeks later, Monica is miserable. At Carrie Valentine's party, Christopher and Cynthia have eyes only for each other. Elaine goes home with a headache. Monica allows Carlo, a stranger, to kiss her, and Christopher, eager to be alone with Cynthia, lets Carlo drive his daughter “home.”

Christopher and Cynthia confess that they are deeply in love, but agree never to meet again. A heartbroken Elaine sees them saying farewell and believes they are lovers.

Cynthia joins a race around the world, starting in New York City. A distraught, suicidal Monica arrives to tell her that Harry, now divorced, refuses to marry her: She told him about her night with Carlo. Cynthia convinces her that Harry will forgive her. Cynthia calls Christopher and tells him not to read Monica's letter. He does and, in a fit of gratitude, goes to her an hour before she leaves for New York. All they can do is say goodbye.

When she lands in San Francisco, Christopher, on a mission to Washington, calls her from New York to say he is waiting. She wins the race. Their reunion is passionate. She did not want to die without knowing love. He promises never to ask her to give up anything. A lamp turns on. Her hand reaches up. “I love my beautiful bracelet… I'm shackled.” He translates the motto on her ring: “Courage conquers death.” “But not love,” she adds. “Give up this altitude flight, for me.” She agrees.

Harry and Monica reconcile. Christopher, just home from the States. agrees to their marriage, but Elaine refuses to go to the registry office (Note: At the time this film was made, divorced people could not be married in the Church of England.) with them. Six months later, Christopher and Cynthia meet for lunch in an out-of-the-way inn. She misses flying. Monica and Harry, who used the same trysting place, drop by for sentimental reasons. They overhear Cynthia and Christopher confessing their love, and leave.

Monica and Harry tell her parents that they are expecting a child. They are delighted. Elaine thanks Cynthia for being Monica's friend. Meanwhile, Cynthia's doctor has told her not to fly because she is pregnant. (Note: Cynthia's pregnancy is implied. Smiling, she tells Christopher that the doctor told her she cannot fly, but that the reason is “not her heart.”) She plans to tell Christopher that night, but he stays with the family, celebrating. The next evening she asks him, “Suppose it were I?” Christopher makes it clear that it would be his duty to leave his wife and marry her.

Cynthia never tells Christopher about the pregnancy. She writes to him, saying that she plans to break the world altitude record—33,000 feet—and not come back. She adds: “Courage can conquer even love.” As the plane climbs, flashbacks over the altimeter show her memories. At 34,000 feet, weeping, she pulls off her oxygen mask. She tries to put it on again but loses consciousness. The plane nosedives into a fiery crash.

In London, a winged statue honors her.

== Cast ==
- Katharine Hepburn as Lady Cynthia Darrington
- Colin Clive as Sir Christopher Strong
- Billie Burke as Lady Elaine Strong
- Helen Chandler as Monica Strong
- Ralph Forbes as Harry Rawlinson
- Irene Browne as Carrie Valentine
- Jack La Rue as Carlo
- Desmond Roberts as Bryce Mercer
- Agostino Borgato as Fortune teller
- Margaret Lindsay as Autograph Seeker at Party
- Gwendolyn Logan as Bradford
- Donald Stuart as Joseph Drummond
- Pat Somerset as Policeman

== Production ==
Originally under the working title of A Great Desire, the film was intended as a vehicle for Ann Harding and Leslie Howard. Director Dorothy Arzner and playwright Zoë Akins based the character of Cynthia on British aviator Amy Johnson. In the novel, Cynthia is a racing driver. Christopher Strong represented the first opportunity for Hepburn to begin developing her screen image as an independent modern woman. This was the only time in her film career that Hepburn played the "other woman".

One of the most notable scenes in the film had Hepburn's character dressed for a costume party in a stunning, form-fitting glittering silver moth costume designed by Walter Plunkett. (Note: Hollywood fashion and costume designer Howard Greer also had an uncredited role in costume-wardrobe.) As part of the impressive production values, the musical score was by noted composer Max Steiner.

Christopher Strong utilized newsreel footage of takeoffs for the around-the world Dole Air Race and the ticker tape parade celebrating Charles Lindbergh's transatlantic flight. Principal photography took place from December 21, 1932, to February 3, 1933.

== Reception ==
Christopher Strong earned a slim profit and positive film reviews. In his review for The New York Times, film critic Mordaunt Hall described Christopher Strong as a star vehicle for Katharine Hepburn, "... who attracted wide attention through her efficient performance in 'A Bill of Divorcement', is the leading light in a pictorial version of Gilbert Frankau's novel, 'Christopher Strong' ... In this her first stellar rôle, Miss Hepburn is far more fortunate than several other stage actresses have been in their initial Hollywood ventures, for aside from giving her excellent opportunities to display her talent, the story is engrossing, and, furthermore, she is supported by a highly capable cast ..."

== In popular culture ==
An image of Hepburn in Christopher Strong wearing her aviator's flight suit was used for the poster advertising the Led Zeppelin North American Tour 1975.

A studio in-joke, the life preserver seen in the opening scavenger hunt sequence, the "SS Venture", is from the ship in "King Kong", another RKO production, shot earlier that year.
