= Adelaide Hanscom Leeson =

American artist and photographer (1875–1931)

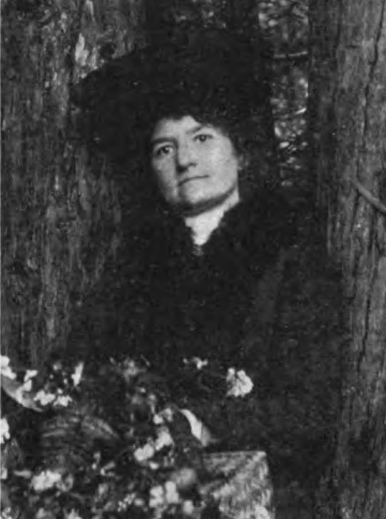
- Born: Adelaide Marquand Hanscom; November 25, 1875; Empire City (now Coos Bay, Oregon)
- Died: November 19, 1931 (aged 55); Pasadena, California
- Education: Mark Hopkins Institute of Art
- Notable work: Published some of the first books using photography to illustrate literary works, including the first edition of The Rubaiyat
- Spouse: Arthur Gerald Leeson

Adelaide Hanscom Leeson (25 November 1875 – 19 November 1931) was an early 20th-century artist and photographer who published some of the first books using photography to illustrate literary works.

== Life ==
=== Early years ===
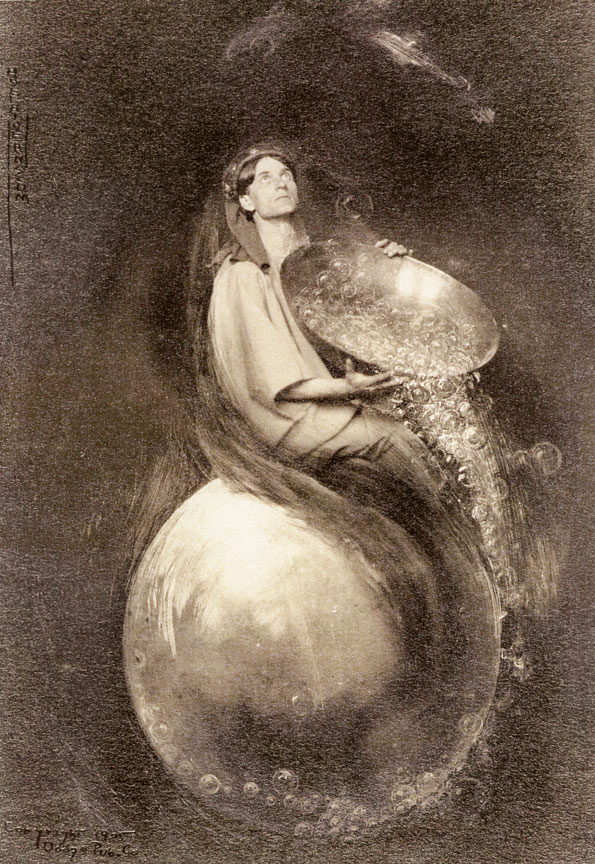
The Eternal Saki, by Adelaide Hanscom. Published in The Rubaiyat of Omar Khayyam, 1905.

Adelaide Marquand Hanscom was born in Empire City (now Coos Bay, Oregon) in 1875, the fourth of six surviving children born to Meldon Laroy (1843–1919) and Louisa Hyde Hanscom (1845–1923). She was one of a set of twins, but the other child was still-born. Hanscom was named after Adelaide Marquand, an early proponent of universal suffrage. Marquand's husband, Henry, was a business associate of Meldon Hanscom, and later published the Berkeley Advocate. Adelaide Marquand was co-editor of the Advocate with her husband, and she remained a family friend and influence on Hanscom for many years.

When Hanscom was six, her family returned to their previous home city of Berkeley, California, in order to obtain a better education for the children. The Hanscoms established their residence at 1525 Walnut Street, where in 1902 Adelaide advertised her Berkeley portrait studio in the Directory. Her father was a Harvard University-educated businessman who later became the city auditor of Berkeley.

Adelaide began her career in the “traditional arts” and in the 1890s studied painting with local artists and design at the University of California. Between 1892 and 1900 she contributed her still lifes in pastel, crayon, oil and watercolors to the exhibits at the California State Fair in Sacramento and at the Mechanics’ Institute Fair in San Francisco. In 1896, the San Francisco Call reproduced her sketch entitled Coos River-Oregon; two years later she exhibited her miniatures painted on ivory at the San Francisco Art Association and briefly established a studio on Pine Street in that city. Between 1900 and 1902 she studied at the California School of Design in San Francisco's Mark Hopkins Institute of Art (now the San Francisco Art Institute) under Arthur Mathews, Alice Chittenden, and Frederick Meyer, but did not graduate believing it to be unimportant. In tandem with her formal education she studied photography in private with her former classmates Emily Pitchford and Laura Adams Armer, who had recently established their own photographic studio. She also is known to have frequented the home of photographer Anne Brigman and is thought to have learned some of her printing technique from Brigman.

In 1902, she set up a studio in San Francisco with fellow photographer Blanche Cummings, and soon they were accepting commissions for portraits and commercial work. A commentary that year in Camera Craft declared that Hanscom's “forte lies in her ability to combine graceful lines and a somewhat original lighting, with the rendering of texture in drapery and flesh tints in soft, mellow lights that are particularly effective.” Adelaide's first awards in photography were two second prizes, one for the portrait The Latest Novel and the other for the cloud effect A Winter Sunset, at the 1901 Channing Club Exhibition in Berkeley. She became a member of the California Camera Club and sold her landscape studies of the Kern River Canyon to Sunset magazine. At the Third Photographic Salon in San Francisco in 1903 Hanscom exhibited five prints, including the highly acclaimed portrait study of Louise Keeler and her baby entitled Mother and Child. One critic said her showing in this exhibition "secured her a place among the foremost pictorialists of the Pacific Coast." This show was also important to Hanscom because it was the first place she would have seen prints by Alfred Stieglitz, Edward Steichen and Gertrude Käsebier, who were the leaders of the pictorial photography movement in New York. As a result of her recent acclaim, her artistry was in high demand. She was so successful that when a newspaper critic asked her if her profession financially rewarded her, she replied "Handsomely". Over the next two decades, her photos were exhibited nationally and abroad, receiving great acclaim and several awards.

=== The Rubaiyat of Omar Khayyam ===
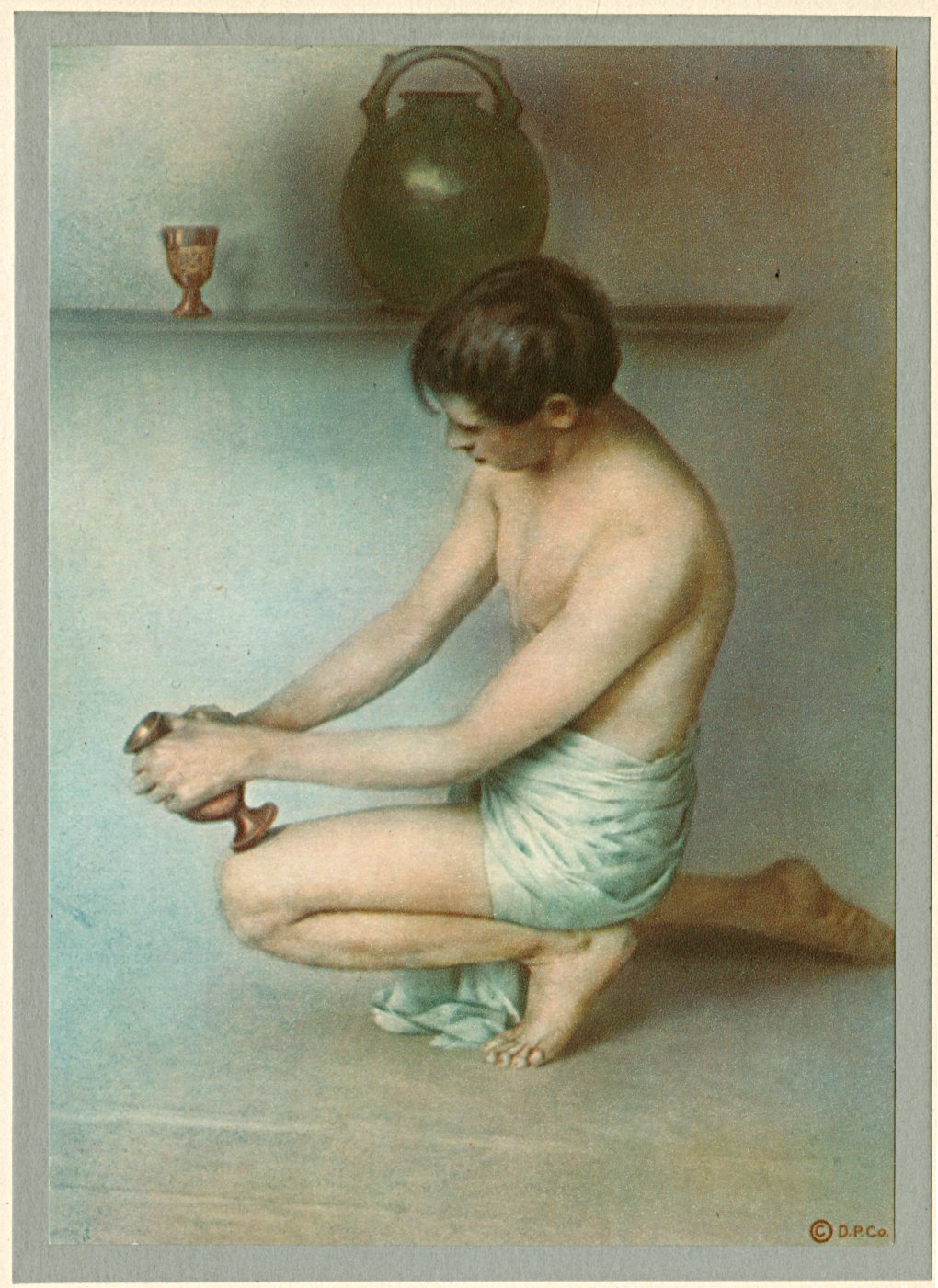
Did the Hand then of the Potter shake?

In late 1903, she began working on a series of photographs to illustrate the classic selection of poems, The Rubaiyat of Omar Khayyam. The concept of illustrating a literary work with fine art photographs was new at that time, and The Rubaiyat was one of the first American books in this genre. She solicited some then well-known California literary figures, including Charles Keeler, Joaquin Miller, George Sterling and George Wharton James, as models for the project. She saw the project as both a classic literary publication and as a metaphor for her times. In a newspaper interview she said decided to illustrate The Rubaiyat because it presented "an expression of the struggle of the human soul after the truth, and against the narrowing influence of the dogmatic religions of our time."

In 1905, she published the first edition of The Rubaiyat, and it became a national sensation. Her hometown newspaper proclaimed "The Berkeley Girl whose 'Omar' photos startle the literary critics." At the Liverpool Exposition in England she received a silver medal and the “greatest attention” for her photo-illustrations in the 1905 Boston edition of The Rubaiyat. Due to the high demand several more editions followed, including a 1914 volume with full-page color plates. The early editions of the book credited only Leeson as the photographer, while later editions said "photographic illustrations by Adelaide Hanscom and Blanche Cummings". Today, the work is recognized for its lush beauty and because the first edition is thought to be one of the first publications in America depicting male nudity in photographs.

Her success was cut short by the 1906 San Francisco earthquake and fire. Hanscom's studio was completely destroyed, and with it all of the negatives for The Rubaiyat. A small number of prints survived in a safe, but otherwise, the only remaining images from this project are in the books themselves. She had to completely start her business and life anew, and since the area where she lived and worked was now mostly uninhabitable she packed her few remaining belongings and moved to Seattle. She soon set up a new studio there with another photographer, Gertrude Wilson, and for the next five years she did commercial portrait works for prominent families in the area. Her photographs often filled the society pages of Seattle's newspaper.

That same year, Alfred Stieglitz listed Hanscom as an Associate Member of his Photo-Secession. It is not known how he became aware of her work, and there is no record of the two meeting. Nonetheless, in December 1906 and into early 1907, Stieglitz included two of Hanscom's prints in the Photo-Secession members exhibit in his Little Galleries of the Photo-Secession in New York.

Hanscom's creativity did not suffer from the loss of her work or her move to a different city. She immediately began working on a new project, illustrations for Elizabeth Barrett Browning's Sonnets from the Portuguese. Work on the project was interrupted several times, and it would take many years for her to complete it.

=== The Alaska-Yukon-Pacific Exposition emblem ===
Emblem of the Alaska–Yukon–Pacific Exposition, designed by Adelaide Hanscom, 1907

In 1907, it was announced that Seattle was to be the site of the great Alaska–Yukon–Pacific Exposition, an enormous world's fair-type exhibition to be held in 1909. The organizers of the Exposition decided to hold a competition for a logo to represent the event, and more than 150 of America's best artists and designers entered the contest. By unanimous vote, the publicity committee selected Hanscom's design as the winner. The design, in a colorful Arts and Crafts movement style, portrayed three women representing Seattle (right), Alaska (middle) and "the Orient" (left) all extending their hands to each other while holding representations of each area's economic strengths (respectively, railroad commerce, mineral resources and ship-going commerce).

On 1 January 1908, Hanscom married British mining engineer and ex-Royal Canadian Mounted Police officer Arthur Gerald Leeson. Soon after they moved to the area near Douglas, Alaska, for her husband's work on the Treadwell gold mine. They remained there for the next three years, although both Hansom and her husband made yearly trips to Seattle and other areas outside of Alaska. In 1909 she spent several months in San Francisco after giving birth to a son, also named Gerald. During this period her photography all but ceased while she sacrificed her needs for her husband's career. In 1911 they moved to Danville, California, where her husband took up farming. She was able to once again set up a darkroom and soon resumed her work.

=== Later years ===
In 1912, she had a daughter, Catherine. She continued to work on her photography while caring for her two children and, at times, running their farm by herself. In 1914 the family moved briefly to Kellogg, Idaho, when Gerald once again worked on a mining project. Adelaide and the children returned to Danville by the end of the year, and Gerald remained in Kellogg for most of 1915.

In 1916, she was finally able to publish The Sonnets of the Portuguese. The first edition included twenty tipped-in photogravures and was followed by two more editions due to its popularity.

Soon after, she began a new series of photographs, using her children as models, for illustrations of nursery rhymes and other children's poems, but due to unforeseen events she never completed the project.

That same year, her husband Gerald enlisted in the Canadian Army in order to fight in World War I, and he left for Europe with very little notice to his family. Within a few weeks he was killed in action. The combination of this loss and that of her father three years later caused her to fall into a deep depression. She became irrational at times and was admitted more than once to mental institutions. She never resumed her photographic work, and, as one writer noted, "the remaining sixteen years of her life seem to have been a feckless series of wanderings with her children in tow." She moved briefly to England to be near her dead husband's relatives, but she eventually returned to California and lived with her daughter.

In November 1931, Leeson was killed by a hit-and-run driver while getting off of a trolley in Pasadena, California. For many years her artistry was forgotten, but as of 2008 her work is once again being recognized for its creativity, beauty and grace.
