= Young Fu of the Upper Yangtze =

1932 children's book by Elizabeth Foreman Lewis

- First edition cover
- Author: Elizabeth Foreman Lewis
- Illustrator: Kurt Wiese (1932); Ed Young (1973)
- Language: English
- Genre: Children's novel
- Published: 1932 (Holt, Rinehart and Winston)
- Publication place: United States
- Media type: Print (Hardback & Paperback)
- Pages: 320
- ISBN: 978-0-8050-8113-8
- OCLC: 71126904
- LC Class: PZ7.L5849 Yo 2007

Young Fu of the Upper Yangtze is a book by Elizabeth Foreman Lewis that won the Newbery Medal for excellence in American children's literature in 1933. The story revolves around Fu Yuin-fah, the son of a widow from the countryside of western China, who wishes to become a coppersmith in the big city on the Yangtze River, Chungking (now spelled Chongqing). With the help of many people, including an old scholar and a white missionary, his goal is eventually attained.

== Plot summary ==
As the book opens, the widowed Fu Be-be arrives on Chair-makers Way in Chungking, China, with her 13-year-old son Yuin-fah and a letter from a village friend to Tang Yu-shu, a master coppersmith, asking that Young Fu be given an apprenticeship in Tang's establishment. Because the widow is alone and Young Fu is her only son, he is allowed to complete his apprenticeship while living in a small rented room with her, rather than living in the shop, a plot device which allows us to see more of the city than might otherwise be the case.

In the chapters that follow, Young Fu goes from being a young and somewhat arrogant boy of 13 to a more capable and humble youth of 18. Along the way, he has encounters with soldiers, foreigners, thieves, political activists, an old scholar, the poor of the city, the rich of the city, and government officials. He is alternately swindled, attacked by bandits, reviled and praised as his coppersmith skills grow.

== Main characters ==
- Young Fu is the main protagonist.
- Fu Be-Be is Young Fu's widowed mother.
- Tang Yu-shu is a master coppersmith — one of Young Fu's mentors.
- Wang Scholar is a poor but educated old man — another of Young Fu's mentors.
- Lu and Old Tsu are the principal journeymen in Tang's shop.
- Small Li is an apprentice in Tang's shop and Young Fu's good friend.
- Small Den is another apprentice in Tang's shop and Young Fu's main antagonist.

== Structure and theme ==
The book is highly episodic, almost like a series of short stories. Like many novels for children, it is a Bildungsroman — the episodes are like stepping stones in the development of the main character.

== Portrayal of Chinese life ==
Young Fu of the Upper Yangtze touches on any number of historical and cultural aspects of China. It takes place in Chungking, at that time the largest city in Szechuan (Sichuan) province, and one of the largest cities in China. (In modern times, Chongqing is its own political entity and not part of Sichuan.)

The historical period depicted, the 1920s, was a turbulent period in China, a time of technological and political change, aspects which are all touched on to varying degrees. Indeed, one who knows Chinese history can find starting points for many discussions, including the opening of city walls, the rise of modern machinery, modern technology and modern medicine, the warlords (known as Tuchun — pronounced "doojün"), the western gun boats, opium and the First and Second Opium War, Sun Yat-sen, the Chinese Nationalist and Chinese Communist forces, the influence of Western foreigners, etc. Since this is a book for children, historical events are mainly just touched on rather than described in detail, so as not to slow down the plot.

Similarly, there are starting points for many discussions about the Chinese culture of the time, including the use of "Young" and "Old" in names and how names are formed, the nature and role of Written Chinese, the social status of the scholar, Buddhism and the veneration of Guanyin, many common Chinese words and phrases (sometimes presented in English translation), the often-Four-character Chinese proverbs, traditional social roles of men and women, New Year and Spring Festival, the prejudice of city folk towards country folk, traditional clothing (including silk), the queue (hairstyle) and foot binding, the social status of soldiers, the role of artisan guilds and other guilds, sedan chairs, weddings and the role of women, story tellers, the role of shame (vs. guilt), the abacus, veneration of ancestors, the traditional humility in interpersonal relationships, the tea house, the coolie, the construction of houses and tenements, traditional medicine, the use of chopsticks and rice in meals, gambling games, bargaining, thriftiness, the kitchen god, the use of animals to name points in time, etc.

== Author's point of view ==
In terms of plot, the story is told through the eyes of Young Fu. However, in terms of the overall conception, the story is told from a Western point of view, which should be no surprise, as the author is a Westerner who herself lived in China and knows the country from first-hand experience. One can see the author's point of view in that the featured Westerner characters tend to be sympathetic, whereas unsympathetic Western characters or influences are merely mentioned or alluded to. However, Westerners are depicted only sporadically in the book, and by the middle of the book they have all evacuated the city, having flown to the gunboats on the Yangtze to avoid the general chaos of the warring Tuchuns.

The main character has a rather Western taste for progress and invention.

Awards
Preceded by Waterless Mountain	Newbery Medal recipient 1933	Succeeded by Invincible Louisa
