= The Pure and the Impure =

1932 novel by Colette

- Author: Colette
- Original title: Le Pur et l'impur and Ces Plaisirs
- Translator: Edith Daily
- Language: French
- Publisher: J. Ferenczi & fils
- Publication date: 1932
- Publication place: France
- English publication date: 1933
- Pages: 258

The Pure and the Impure (French: Le Pur et l'impur) is a 1932 novel by the French writer Colette. It consists of a series of conversations about sex, gender and attraction. Colette considered it her best book, and described it as "the nearest I shall ever come to writing an autobiography".

== Publication ==
A version of the book was first published as Ces plaisirs... ("These pleasures") in 1932. In 1941 a substantially revised version was published as Le Pur et l'impur, which was the title Colette originally had thought of for the book.

== Reception ==
Margaret Wallace of The New York Times wrote: "On the whole, The Pure and the Impure presents a mildly interesting collection of case histories, and some of the generalizations Colette is tempted to draw from them are provocative in the highest degree. But the effect of the book, on the whole, is rather empty. Except as a collection of anecdotes of uneven quality, it lacks excuse for being; and Colette emerges in it less as the philosopher of love she has always seemed to be than as an industrious reporter of love affairs."

== See also ==
- 1932 in literature
- 20th-century French literature
