= Yankee in Oz =

Book by Ruth Plumly Thompson

- First edition cover
- Author: Ruth Plumly Thompson
- Illustrator: Dick Martin
- Language: English
- Series: The Oz Books
- Genre: Fantasy
- Published: 1972 (International Wizard of Oz Club)
- Publication place: United States
- Media type: Print
- Pages: 94 pp.
- Preceded by: Merry Go Round in Oz
- Followed by: The Enchanted Island of Oz

Yankee in Oz is a 1972 novel in the Oz series by Ruth Plumly Thompson. It was the first published by The International Wizard of Oz Club. The novel was originally written in 1959, but because the Oz books were not selling, it was not published. A letter from the Henry Regnery Company, which bought Reilly & Lee, is reproduced in the front indicating the publisher's blessing for the new Oz book to appear.

The first two editions of the book were published in 8½ x 11 inch format and running only 94 pages. This was done at the request of illustrator Dick Martin to reduce the number of required illustrations and to show them closer to the actual size they were drawn. The second printing (1986) featured a new cover, with the first edition artwork reprinted preceding the title page. The third printing (2007) is standard Oz book size. Its cover is a gaudier redesign of the second edition cover. It is followed by sequel The Enchanted Island of Oz (1976).

The novel also features maps by James E. Haff, and as such, Thompson correctly places the Winkie Country in the west of Oz.

== Plot summary ==
The story begins with Thomas P. "Tompy" Terry, an athlete and musician son of a physicist, star drummer in his marching band at Pennwood prep in fictional small town, Pennwood, Pennsylvania, swept away by then-fictitious Hurricane Hannah on his way to the Labor Day parade.

He lands on the shore of Winkie Lake, where he meets Yankee, the first American dog in space, a Bull Terrier delighted at his newfound ability to talk.

The nearest town is Wackajammy, in the northeastern part of the Winkie Country, which is the breadbasket of the West. The King, Jackalack, believes that Tompy and Yankee are there to fulfill a prophecy to rescue their princess, his aunt, Doffi, who instructs all of the bakers of the town, who refuse to do any work without her present. Yammer Jammer, the king's adviser, using a book called the Mind Reader determines that the two have no intent to do the search when they leave, and locks them in prison. Yankee is able to dig out during the night and get the key, and when they leave, they steal the Mind Reader.

Though determined to get home, Yankee in particular wishes to rescue the princess anyway. They next encounter an anteater, a town of powdered and packaged workaholic people, Tidy Town, whose king wants to force them to be listeners, cross into the Gillikin Country with the aid of Tim Ber the Trav-E-Log, meet a kindly but private woodsman named Axel, and a village of pleasant people with luminescent paper lanterns for heads who are active only at night.

Climbing Mount Upandup, they meet a flower fairy named Su-Posy who mentions that she delivers flowers to an imprisoned princess nearby to cheer her up. Also resting on this mountain is Jinnicky the Red Jinn, with whom Tompy and Yankee make fast friends.

Also living on the mountain is Badmannah, who has kidnapped Princess Doffi, and soon after, uses a magic magnifying glass to abduct Princess Ozma and the entire Emerald City palace.

Regrouping at the Red Jinn's palace, Yankee procures a net and attaches it to Jinnicky's jinrikisha as a drag net, using it to capture Badmannah and lower him to the bottom of the Nonestic Ocean. He cannot drown here, being immortal like all Ozites, but it will get him out of the way for a while.

That leaves the task of restoring the Emerald City palace. Except for Ozma, the residents are all crammed into a magic box that Jinnicky has not allowed to be opened until the palace is restored, except when Yankee is briefly trapped as well. Once opened, Ozma is still missing. Using the Magic Picture, she is seen in Badmannah's cave, Ozma having wished herself via the Magic Belt to the nearest safe place, and with Badmannah gone, it was. Using his red magic, Jinnicky restores the Emerald City.

Jinnicky flies Tompy home in his jinrikisha, and gives him a little jar to open when in need of his magic. Yankee is recognizable from newspapers, and Mr. Terry returns him to the Army, requesting that he be given an honorable discharge to be Tompy's pet. The Army representative initially declines, but when Tompy opens the jar, relents.

Yankee retains the ability to speak once a week, and together, they decide to read The Purple Prince of Oz a chapter a night to learn about the adventures of their friend, Jinnicky.

Tompy is not the first traveler to Oz to be familiar with it from reading the books, which are explicitly referenced as being available in the United States as fairy tales—Peter Brown in The Gnome King of Oz briefly mentions having read an Oz book (Betsy Bobbin and Trot are aware of Oz before they get there, but we are not told how). It is, however, the first to mention another Oz book within the text, although John R. Neill had drawn an image of a shelf in Oz full of the Oz books, one being read. The book has no subplot, and moves straightforwardly through its single plot, uncharacteristic of previous Oz books, but typical of the deuterocanonical books of which it is the first.

The Oz books
Previous book: Merry Go Round in Oz	Yankee in Oz; 1972	Next book: The Enchanted Island of Oz
