= Waterless Mountain =

1931 novel by Laura Adams Armer

- Author: Laura Adams Armer
- Illustrator: Sidney Armer, Laura Adams Armer
- Language: English
- Genre: Children's novel
- Publisher: Longmans, Green
- Publication date: 1931
- Publication place: United States
- Media type: Print (Hardback & Paperback)

Waterless Mountain is an American novel by Laura Adams Armer published in 1931, recommended for teens between the ages of 13 and 19. Awarded the Newbery Medal for excellence in American children's literature, as well as Longmans Juvenile Fiction Prize, it is a coming-of-age story about a Navajo boy.

== Plot ==
Younger Brother, a Navajo Indian living in Arizona in the 1920s, wishes to follow in the footsteps of his uncle and become a medicine man. To accomplish this task, he must undergo several arduous years of training to learn the ancient songs and customs of his ancestors. This includes a journey to the Pacific Ocean in the far west, participating in traditional ceremonies, and climbing the nearby Waterless Mountain. Throughout his training, his Uncle shares numerous legends of their culture.

== Characters ==
Younger Brother - The main character, who aspires to become a medicine man. His true name is Dawn Boy, but as this name can only be spoken in special circumstances, others usually refer to him as Younger Brother, or Little Singer. He often displays a great deal of insight on many situations, which convinces his Uncle that he is destined to become a medicine man. The book spans the period from when Younger Brother is eight years old until his early adolescence.

Uncle - The brother of Younger Brother's mother. He is the medicine man for the local community, and is thus highly respected. He serves as Younger Brother's mentor, guiding him through the process of learning the ceremonies and stories that are required for his position.

Big Man - A Caucasian man who owns the local trading post. He has a great interest and respect for Navajo culture, and helps out the community whenever he can. He and Younger Brother have an abiding affection for one another, referring to each other as "Grandfather" and "Grandson".

Awards
Preceded by The Cat Who Went to Heaven	Newbery Medal recipient 1932	Succeeded by Young Fu of the Upper Yangtze
