= Laura Adams Armer =

American artist and writer

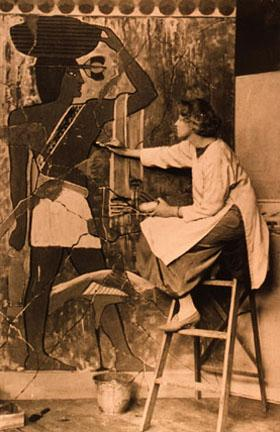
- Armer at the California School of Design c. 1895
- Born: Laura May Adams; January 12, 1874; Sacramento, California, U.S.
- Died: March 16, 1963 (aged 89); Sacramento, California, U.S.
- Education: California School of Design in San Francisco
- Occupations: American writer, novelist and photographer
- Spouse: Sidney Armer
- Writing career
- Language: English
- Notable awards: Newbery Medal for Waterless Mountain, Caldecott Honor for The Forest Pool, 1939.

Laura Adams Armer (January 12, 1874 – March 16, 1963) was an American artist and writer. In 1932, her novel Waterless Mountain won the Newbery Medal. She was also an early photographer in the San Francisco Bay Area.

== Biography ==
Laura May Adams was born in Sacramento, California, and relocated with her family to San Francisco before 1880. Her father was a carpenter and her mother a dressmaker. In 1893 she began her art studies at the California School of Design in the Mark Hopkins Institute and left in 1899 to open her own photographic studio in the Flood Building. She achieved rapid success as a portrait photographer, published her theories on composing studies for the camera, and exhibited with great acclaim at the San Francisco Sketch Club (1900); California State Fair (1901–02); New York Camera Club (1901); Photographic Salons of San Francisco (1901-Second Prize; 1902–03); Starr King Fraternity in Oakland (1902); and San Francisco Art Association (1903). In February 1902 she sold her studio to Berkeley photographer Adelaide Hanscom and traveled in the Southwest with her fiancé Sidney Armer.

The couple married that July and in 1903 moved to Berkeley for the birth of their son, Austin. The pace of her exhibitions accelerated with a display at the Oakland Art Fund of her bookplate designs and prints, which Anne Brigman called "exquisite", and contributions to the American Photographic Salons in New York City and Washington, D.C. She returned from a trip to Tahiti in October 1905 and shortly thereafter her infant daughter died. She emerged from a short retirement in late 1906 and became an active exhibiting member of the Berkeley art colony. She also exhibited on the Monterey Peninsula and vacationed in Carmel with Anne Brigman. Laura won a silver medal at Seattle's Alaska–Yukon–Pacific Exposition in 1909 and began to experiment with color photography in her popular Berkeley studio.

A turning point in her career came in 1919–20 when she began to document systematically the Hopi and Navajo of the Southwest, which resulted in numerous publications on their societies, art (especially sand paintings), and folklore, as well as hundreds of photographs and the film The Mountain Chant (1928).

Armer's children's book Waterless Mountain tells the story of a Navajo boy called Younger Brother and was illustrated by both Armer and her husband. The book won the Newbery Medal in 1932. Another of her children's books, The Forest Pool, was named a Caldecott Honor Book in 1939.

Armer died in Sacramento on March 16, 1963, at the age of 89.

== Exhibitions ==
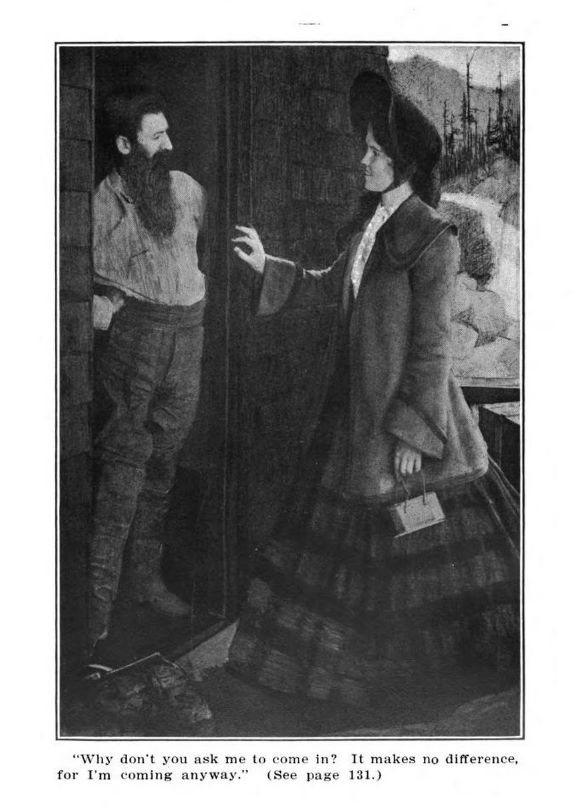
Illustration from Leaves from an Argonaut's note book, 1905

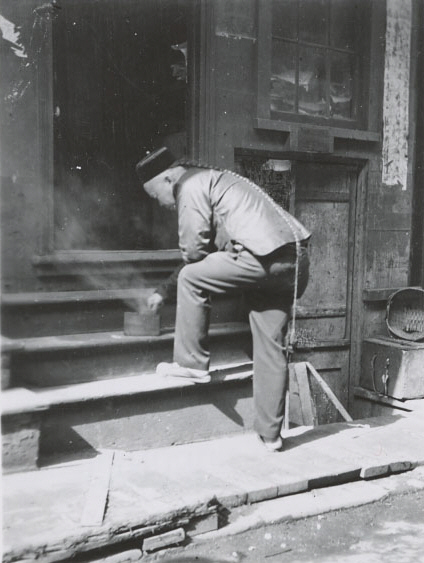
A man with a queue, photographed in Chinatown by Armer.

Armer's photographs of San Francisco's Chinatown (c. 1900) are in the collection of the California Historical Society of San Francisco. Her photos of the American Southwest are in the Phoebe A. Hearst Museum of Anthropology, Berkeley, and the Wheelwright Museum of the American Indian, Santa Fe, New Mexico.

== Published works ==
- Armer, Laura Adams (1931). Waterless Mountain. Longmans, Green.
- Armer, Laura Adams (1933). Dark Circle of Branches. Longman, Green.
- Armer, Laura Adams (1962). In Navajo Land. D. McKay Company.
- Armer, Laura Adams (1935). Southwest. Longmans, Green and Co.
- Armer, Laura Adams (1937). The trader's children. Longmans, Green and co.
- Armer, Laura Adams (1938). Farthest West ... Illustrated by Sidney Armer. Longmans, Green & Co.
- Armer, Laura Adams (1938). The Forest Pool. Longmans, Green & Co.

Awards
Preceded by Elizabeth Coatsworth	Newbery Medal winner 1932	Succeeded by Elizabeth Foreman Lewis
