= The Wishing Horse of Oz =

1935 novel

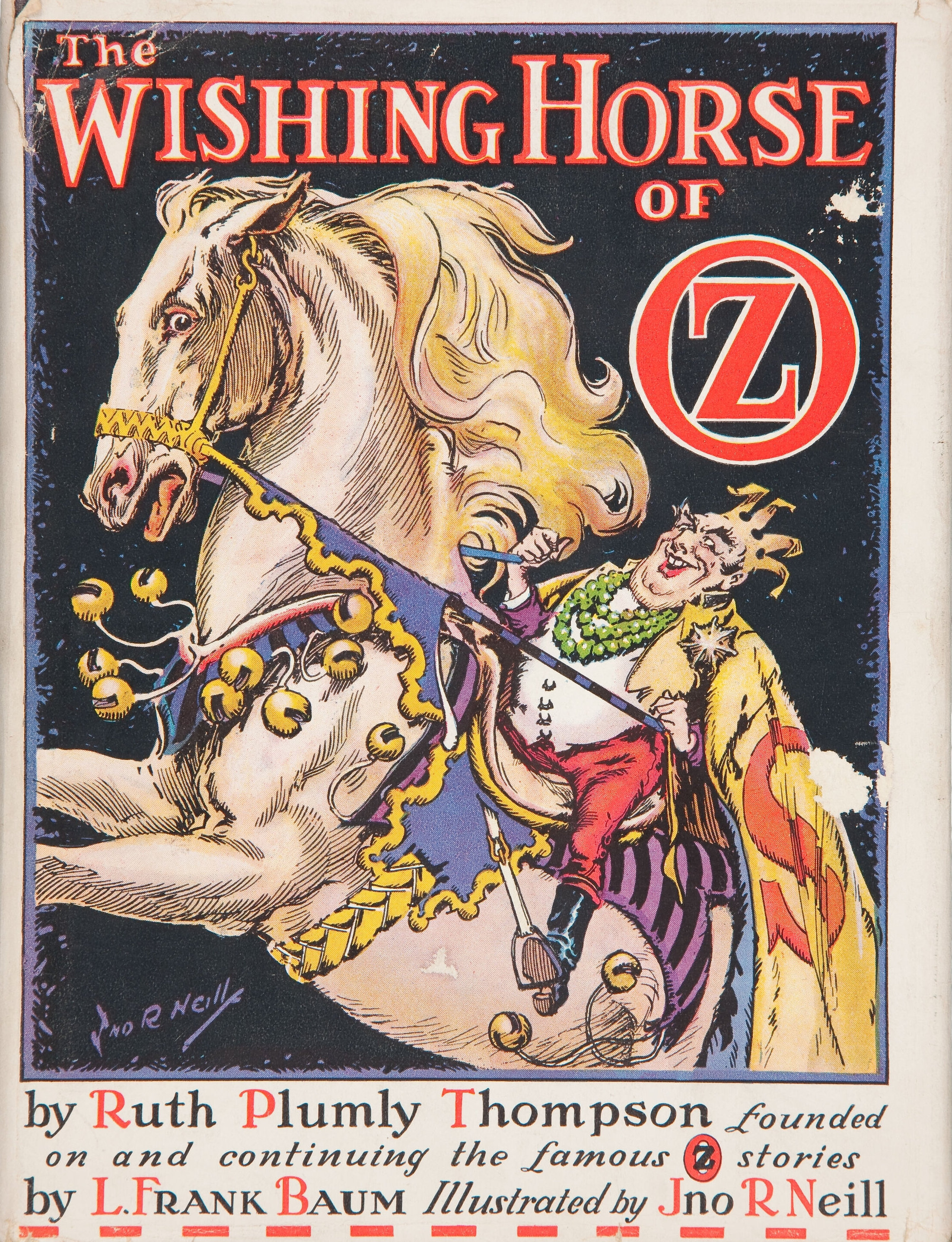
- First edition cover
- Author: Ruth Plumly Thompson
- Illustrator: John R. Neill
- Genre: Juvenile fantasy
- Published: Chicago: Reilly & Lee Co., 1935
- Media type: Book
- Pages: 298
- OCLC: 2764298
- Preceded by: Speedy in Oz
- Followed by: Captain Salt in Oz

The Wishing Horse of Oz (1935) is the twenty-ninth book in the Oz series created by L. Frank Baum and his successors, and the fifteenth written by Ruth Plumly Thompson. It was illustrated by John R. Neill. The novel was followed by Captain Salt in Oz (1936). This entry marked the point at which Thompson had written more Oz books than Baum.

== Plot ==
This Oz mystery starts in the small, poor kingdom of Skampavia, where King Skamperoo wishes for a horse using enchanted emerald necklaces. When Chalk, a talking Horse from Oz, falls from the sky, Skamperoo decides the emeralds must be from the Emerald City, and decides to conquer all of Oz. Meanwhile in the Emerald City, there is a great celebration of the discovery of Oz by mortals. During the celebration, the whiskers of the Soldier with Green Whiskers turn red. Dorothy uses one of the Wizard’s Wishing pills to Save Ozma and Oz. Skamperoo magically causes all the residents of Oz to forget their rightful rulers and accept him as their emperor instead.

Dorothy runs to the throne room but finds Chalk and Skamperoo wearing Ozma’s Crown. Only Dorothy and Pigasus, the flying pig, are able to remember Princess Ozma, the true ruler of Oz, and together they set out to rescue her. They meet Gloma, the witch of the Black Forest in the Winkie Country. They meet Kaliko in the Nome Kingdom and there they find out Ozma, Glinda, The Tin Woodman, The Wizard, Jinnicky, The Soldier with Green Whiskers, Highboy, Joe King and Queen Hyacinth, King Cheeriobed and Queen Orin and Prince Philador are at the bottom of Lightning Lake, under Thunder Mountain.

While on the way to Thunder Mountain, they meet Bitty Bit, the seer of Some Summit in his shooting tower. Bitty Bit takes them back to the Emerald City and confronts Skamperoo and Chalk. The mystery in this story is how to make the necklaces grant wishes, which only the horse Chalk knows how to do.

This was the last Oz book to feature illustrations in color, and only the first edition and the International Wizard of Oz Club edition (1990) have them.

== Reception ==
Samuel A. Kaufman in the Brooklyn Times Union gave the book a negative review, saying, "The magic charm of the original Oz is not there... There are too many characters, too many complications, too much machinery — and too much book. It is insufferably padded." A more generous reviewer in the Columbia Missourian wrote, "Children who like beautiful things, lovable and unusual fairy people and animals, and a really important mystery will like The Wishing Horse of Oz. I can't tell you enough nice things about it."

== Copyright status ==
This book, along with Thompson's next four, did not get renewed for copyright, making them public domain and freely readable online.

The Oz books
Previous book: Speedy in Oz	The Wishing Horse of Oz; 1935	Next book: Captain Salt in Oz
