= Ojo in Oz =

1933 book by Ruth Plumly Thompson

- Cover of Ojo in Oz.
- Author: Ruth Plumly Thompson
- Illustrator: John R. Neill
- Language: English
- Series: The Oz Books
- Genre: Children's novel
- Publisher: Reilly & Lee
- Publication date: 1933
- Publication place: United States
- Media type: Print (Hardcover)
- Pages: 304
- Preceded by: The Purple Prince of Oz
- Followed by: Speedy in Oz

Ojo in Oz (1933) is the twenty-seventh book in the Oz series created by L. Frank Baum and his successors, and the thirteenth written by Ruth Plumly Thompson. It was illustrated by John R. Neill. The novel was followed by Speedy in Oz (1934).

== Plot ==
Ojo (from The Patchwork Girl of Oz) is captured by wanderers who plan to turn him over to a mysterious enemy who has offered to pay a large reward to anyone who captures and delivers Ojo to his stronghold at Moojer Mountain. Ojo befriends the gypsies' captive dancing bear Snufferbux (whose full name is Snuffurious, Buxorious, Blundurious Boroso). The gypsies are in turn captured by Realbad, the leader of a gang of bandits, who carries a secret that is connected to the Munchkin boy and his habitually closemouthed guardian Unc Nunkie. Realbad learns about the reward and resolves to collect it himself by delivering Ojo to Moojer Mountain. Separated from the bandit gang, and hopelessly lost, Ojo and Snufferbux reluctantly agree to travel with Realbad (who is a resourceful survivalist) until they either get to the Emerald City or to Moojer Mountain. While traveling, they face various dangers together and gradually develop a genuine friendship.

Meanwhile, Dorothy, Scraps, and the Cowardly Lion set out to rescue Ojo, but get lost themselves, and visit Dicksey Land and other strange places. Everyone is menaced by a fearsome wizard, and Ojo learns who his parents are.

== Reception ==
The Los Angeles Times said, "What with unicorns and a dancing bear and a frightful gentleman whose face is made up of gearwheels, there are plenty of interesting people in this eventful story." The Minneapolis Star Tribune agreed that the book's adventures "are as fantastic as anything that ever happened in Oz."

In A Brief Guide to Oz, Paul Simpson notes, "Ojo in Oz has attracted some negative attention from recent scholars for the highly stereotypical way in which Thompson describes the Gypsies who feature heavily within the story, and for their eventual fate — others who commit the same crimes are simply transformed into other creatures, but the Gypsies are banished to Southern Europe."

The Oz books
Previous book: The Purple Prince of Oz	Ojo in Oz; 1933	Next book: Speedy in Oz
