= Christopher Strong (novel) =

1932 novel by Gilbert Frankau

- Author: Gilbert Frankau
- Language: English
- Genre: Romance
- Publisher: Hutchinson & Co
- Publication date: 1932
- Publication place: United Kingdom
- Media type: Print

Christopher Strong is a romance novel by the British writer Gilbert Frankau which was first published in 1932.

== Film adaptation ==
In 1933 the novel was adapted into an American film Christopher Strong made by RKO Pictures and starring Katharine Hepburn and Colin Clive.

== Bibliography ==
- Goble, Alan. The Complete Index to Literary Sources in Film. Walter de Gruyter, 1999.
