= The Good Quaker in French Legend =

1932 nonfiction book by Edith Philips

- 2011 edition
- Author: Edith Philips
- Language: English
- Genre: Nonfiction
- Published: 1932
- Publisher: University of Pennsylvania Press
- Publication place: United States
- Media type: Print
- Pages: 235
- ISBN: 9781512805888
- OCLC: 752459025

The Good Quaker in French Legend is a 1932 nonfiction collection of writings by Edith Philips. It discusses French interest in Quakerism and Penn's colony during the eighteenth century.

== Reception ==
French philosophy and literary scholar Albert Schinz remarked that "Students of French literature should know of this book which can be said to be one of the very best pieces of American erudition of the past years in our field."

The Good Quaker in French Legend has also been reviewed in the academic journals Revue de Littérature Comparée and Neophilologus.
