= Sara Banerji =

British author and artist (1932–2025)

- Born: Sara Ann Mostyn; 6 June 1932; Stoke Poges, Buckinghamshire, England
- Died: 2 November 2025 (aged 93); Oxford, Oxfordshire, England
- Occupations: Author, artist, sculptor
- Spouse: Ranjit Banerji (1957–2022)
- Parent(s): Anita Mostyn; Sir Basil Mostyn
- Relatives: Henry Fielding

Sara Banerji (née Mostyn; 6 June 1932 – 2 November 2025) was a British author, artist and sculptor. She was born in England, but lived in Southern Rhodesia and then in India for many years. She later lived in Oxford with her family.

== Early life ==
Banerji was born on 6 June 1932, eldest of four children (two sons, two daughters) of Sir Basil Mostyn, 13th Baronet, and Anita Mary, daughter of Lieutenant Colonel Rowland Charles Feilding, of the Coldstream Guards. Anita Mostyn was a novelist, writing as Anne Mary Fielding (sic) in the 1950s. She was a great-granddaughter of the Basil Feilding, 7th Earl of Denbigh, a courtier; one of her relatives was Henry Fielding, whose grand-uncle was the 3rd Earl of Denbigh (note: the family surname varied in spelling).

In 1939, when Banerji was seven, World War II began, and she was evacuated to various large and old country mansions. Her father, Basil Mostyn, fought in the war, becoming a lieutenant in the Royal Army Service Corps.

After the war was over, Banerji emigrated with her family to Southern Rhodesia, where her father grew tobacco. The family lived in a single mud rondavel with no electricity or running water.

== Career ==
Banerji later travelled around Europe, working as an au pair and attending art school in Austria. She worked as an artist, holding exhibitions of her oil paintings in India. She also worked in sculpture. In India, she taught riding and rode as a jockey.

Whilst working in a coffee house in Oxford, one of her customers was her future husband, Ranjit Banerji, an undergraduate from India. They married and moved to India, where they lived for 17 years. Banerji attempted to run a dairy farm, but was defeated by seasons of heavy rain. The Banerji family returned to England in 1973. The family's total available funds were £10, Ranjit and Sara having £5 each. Banerji borrowed money, bought some ponies at auction and gave riding lessons. She subsequently started a gardening business in Sussex.

Banerji lived in Oxford, where she taught writing in the Oxford University Department for Continuing Education until her death. She and her husband, who died in 2022, practised meditation and yogic flying every day. Banerji frequently held exhibitions of her work.

Banerji died on 2 November 2025, at the age of 93.

== Personal life ==
On 4 March 1957, she married Ranjit Banerji. They had three daughters and five grandchildren.

== Bibliography ==
- Cobwebwalking (1986)
- The Wedding of Jayanthi Mandel (1987)
- The Tea Planter's Daughter (1988)
- Shining Agnes (1991)
- Absolute Hush (1991)
- Writing on Skin (1993)
- Shining Hero (2002)
- The Waiting Time (2006)
- Blood Precious (2007)

== Sources ==
- WorldCat author page
- "Sara Banerji." Contemporary Authors Online. Detroit: Gale, 2001. Biography in Context. Web. 17 Jan. 2014. Gale Document Number: GALE|H1000004907
- Profile at FantasticFiction
- Profile at Transita
- The Collapse of Fairyland. ROBB FORMAN DEW. The New York Times. 18 October 1987. 18 January 2014
- anna battista Book Review: Sara Banerji's The Waiting Time 18 January 2014
- Indian exotica. Madhu Jain. India Today. 18 January 2014
- The Hindu. Review of Shining Hero. 18 January 2014
