= Oscar V. Lange =

American photographer and painter

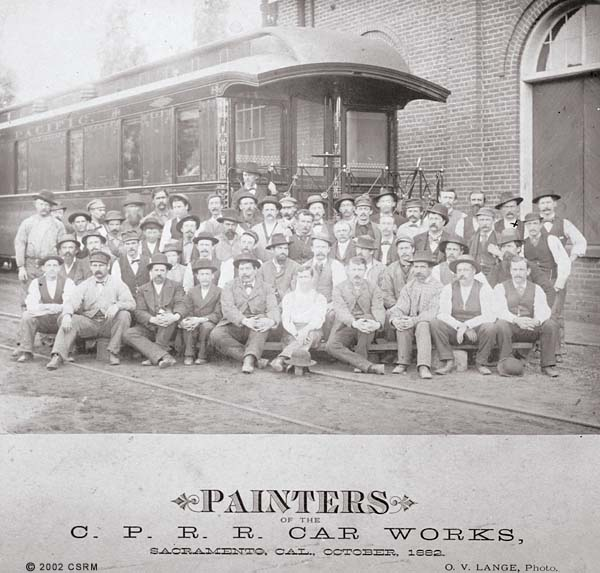
Group portrait of Central Pacific Railroad Sacramento Shops painters (1882)

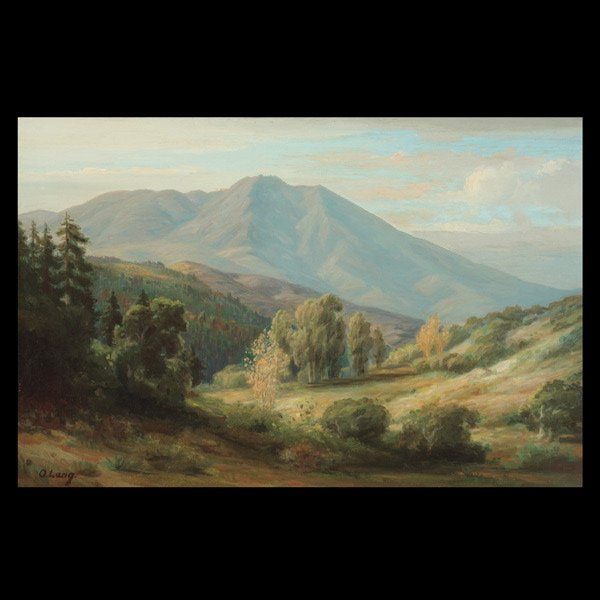
"View of Mt. Tamalpais"

Oscar Victor Lange (1853–1913) was a leading photographer and occasional landscape painter in the San Francisco Bay Area of California during the late 19th century. His work is typically credited as "O.V. Lange".

Lange was born on June 6, 1853, in Hoboken, New Jersey, to German immigrants Albert Clement and Emma (Leischhardt) Fahrenberg. His father was a portrait painter. Oscar received formal training as both an architect and artist. The Fahrenbergs were constantly on the move, showing up in New Orleans during the 1860 census and in Texas for the 1870 census. In 1873 Oscar moved to San Francisco and adopted the surname "Lange" while working with Ernest W. Newth making stereographs. In the 1880s, he opened his own studio and gallery on Market Street, moving to Montgomery Street in 1887. Two years earlier he had moved his residence to Berkeley, California.

Lange's most widely photographed subjects were architectural and included structures in San Francisco, Oakland, the campus of the University of California, Berkeley, and the downtown section of Berkeley. He also photographed the workers of the Central Pacific and Southern Pacific railroad shops in Sacramento, California. Although not a member of the faculty of the University of California, he did work on a number of projects for the University including some astronomical photography at the Lick Observatory with lenses that he created.

A few of the San Francisco venues that exhibited Oscar’s photos include the: California Midwinter International Exposition (1894); First, Second & Third Photographic Salons (1901–03); and California Camera Club (1904–05). At the First Salon Arnold Genthe reviewed Lange's work, which included Tamalpais in Summer Light, The Silent Houses and After the Storm, and declared that he "must be counted among the best landscape photographers . . . with a marvelous facility for rendering delicate atmospheric light effects." His photographs and technical articles frequently appeared in the monthly journal Camera Craft and in the magazines: Out West, Sunset and Country Life in America. He lectured widely on the “art” of photography with a special emphasis on “floral portraiture.”

He actively supported the Berkeley art colony between 1906 and 1911 and contributed to exhibitions at the Studio Building, Hillside Club, and Berkeley Art Association. In the spring of 1908 the artist Sally Daingerfield curated an exhibition at the Studio Building with fifty of his hand-colored photographs of wildflowers and landscapes. That fall Anne Brigman called these same landscapes at the Arts & Crafts show in Oakland's Idora Park "delicate." His oil paintings were displayed in shows from San Francisco to the Monterey Peninsula. He was instrumental in founding Berkeley’s first public library, was an active environmentalist, and designed several impressive homes.

Lange never married and lived quietly with his artist-sister, Marie. He died in Berkeley on December 9, 1913, from tuberculosis. He was friends with the noted architect Bernard Maybeck who served as one of the pall bearers at his funeral.
