= Margareta Suber =

Swedish writer

Siri Margareta Augusta Suber
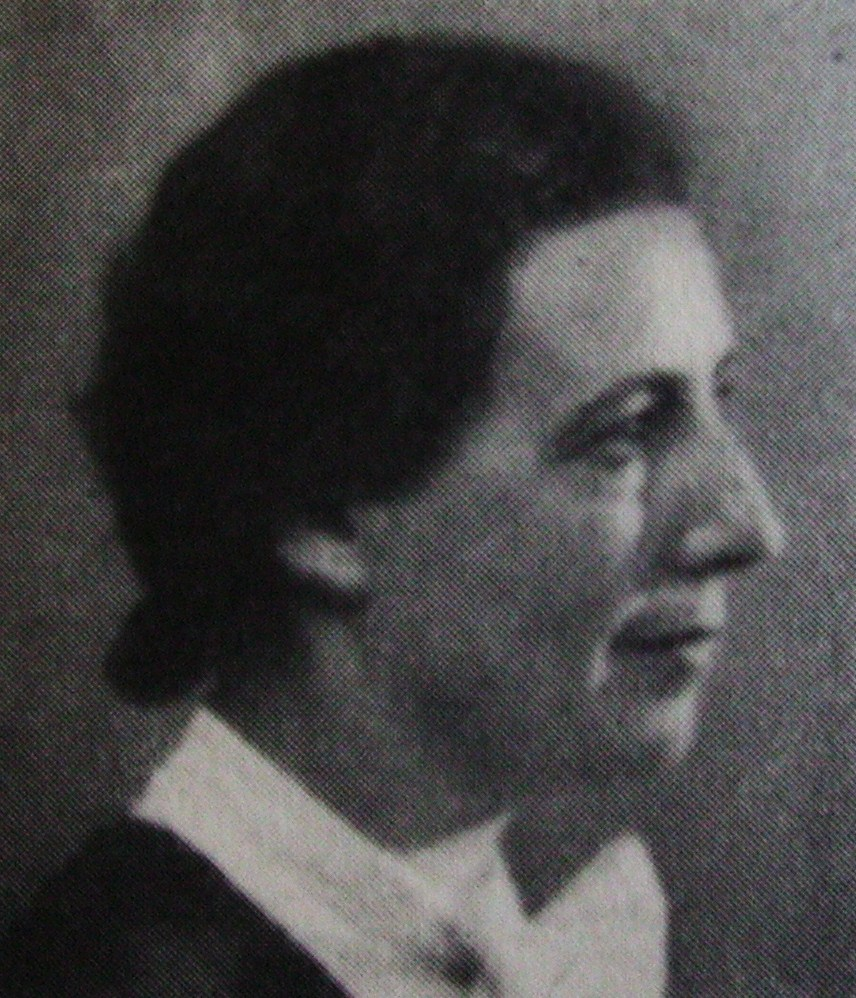
- Suber in 1936
- Born: November 2, 1892; Linköping, Sweden
- Died: April 6, 1984 (aged 91); Solna, Stockholm
- Occupations: Writer, journalist

Siri Margareta Augusta Suber (2 November 1892 – 6 April 1984) was a Swedish writer. She is best known as a novelist but was also a travel writer, translator, poet and children's writer.

== Biography ==
Suber was born in 1892 in Linköping to Johan Hjalmar Suber, a doctor, and Siri Hildegard Kindbom. She graduated from university in 1915 and began her writing career as a journalist from 1916 to 1924. In 1918, she reported on the Finnish Civil War as a correspondent to Stockholms Dagblad. She married Georg Topelius in the same year and began to write children's books under her married name, Margareta Tobelius (in her later life, she wrote under her maiden name). These included Mor berättar för sina små (1923), Negergossen Yoka (1924), Trollsaxen (1925) and De gamla goda sagorna (1926).

Suber's first and most famous novel was Charlie, published in 1932, which is considered the first Swedish lesbian novel. Charlie depicts an eponymous tomboy who realises that she is in love with another woman while on a summer vacation in Sardinia. The novel's release caused significant controversy even though the publishers advertised it discreetly, without emphasising the lesbian storyline.

Suber's three subsequent novels, Ett helsike för en man (1933), Du står mig emot (1939) and Jonna (1940), focus on marital and relationship problems. Her 1942 novel Vänd ditt ansikte till mig is a criticism of Nazi ideology and antisemitism. In the 1940s and '50s Suber also published a variety of travelogues from Sardinia, Bulgaria, Italy, France, Morocco and Algeria. She also published two collections of short stories, Musikanter på livstid (1950) and Ångest och dårskap (1965). She published her first poetry collection, Allt som närmar sig, in 1976 followed by Böljegång in 1980. She died in 1984 in Solna, Stockholm.

She is the subject of a 1934 portrait by artist Bertil Damm (1887–1942), which is part of the collection at the National Museum of Fine Arts.

Near the end of her life, she reprised authorship as she began: "she again wrote a book for young people. It was matter of life and death: Adventures in Sardinia (1984), which also became her last book."
