= The Enchanted Island of Oz =

Book by Ruth Plumly Thompson

- First edition
- Author: Ruth Plumly Thompson
- Illustrator: Dick Martin
- Language: English
- Series: The Oz Books
- Genre: Fantasy fiction
- Publisher: The International Wizard of Oz Club
- Publication date: 1976
- Publication place: United States
- Media type: Print
- Pages: 77 pp.
- Preceded by: Yankee in Oz
- Followed by: The Forbidden Fountain of Oz

The Enchanted Island of Oz is a children's novel written by Ruth Plumly Thompson and illustrated by Dick Martin, and first published in 1976. The novel is an unofficial entry in the Oz series created by L. Frank Baum and his successors. It is the last (and shortest) of Thompson's 21 novels about the Land of Oz. Written as a standalone novel, unrelated to Oz, around 1948, Thompson revised it as an Oz tale at the request of Oz Club president Fred Meyer.

Thompson's book tells the story of David Perry, a boy from Pennsylvania who, on a visit to a circus, wishes that a camel could talk. He is amazed when his wish is granted. (Only later does David learn that he possesses a magic wishing button, which enables and empowers the action of the story.) David nicknames the talking camel Humpty Bumpty; together the boy and camel embark on a whirlwind tour of strange lands, including Somewhere, Dwindlebury, and the flying island of Kapurta (which is the enchanted Island of the title). They meet the range of strange characters typical of Oz literature—among them, Water Lily (a lake nymph), Queen Else of Somewhere, and a dragon named Dismocolese. Eventually the boy and camel make their way to the Emerald City in time for a birthday party for the Cowardly Lion.

The Enchanted Island of Oz shows strong resemblances with Thompson's previous Oz book, Yankee in Oz. It also bears clear relationships to a larger context of fantasy works; Jonathan Swift's flying Island of Laputa in Gulliver's Travels is one of the most obvious of these links.

The original edition of the novel contains maps of the fantasy territories drawn by Martin and James Haff, and an afterword by Dorothy C. Maryott.

The Oz books
Previous book: Yankee in Oz	The Enchanted Island of Oz; 1976	Next book: The Forbidden Fountain of Oz
