= Elizabeth Foreman Lewis =

American writer (1892–1958)

Elizabeth Foreman Lewis (May 24, 1892 – August 7, 1958) was an American children's writer. She received the Newbery Award and the Lewis Carroll Shelf Award.

== Early years and education ==
Elizabeth Foreman was born in Baltimore, Maryland, May 24, 1892. She studied art at the Maryland Institute of Fine Arts from 1909 to 1910. Of that time, she has said,

My sister and I grew up in a world of books, country life, horses, dogs, and a variety of other pets, a background threaded by colorful strands of wit, hearty laughter, singing, hospitality, and naturally in Maryland, good food. Our chief instruction, beside that of school and church, came from the proverbs in the home. Sometimes I think these brief, pungent expressions of man's age-old wisdom have had more influence than anything else in shaping my life. When editors and secretaries weary of my endless re-writing, they do not guess that I am still at the mercy of ten words which accompanied every girlhood task: 'If worth doing at all, it is worth doing well!'

She attended a secretarial school in Baltimore from 1916 to 1917, preparatory to travel to China for the Methodist Women's Board. Later in 1917, she received religious instruction at the Bible Seminary in New York.

== Career ==
After her education, Foreman became a Methodist missionary and teacher in China, initially as the associate mission treasurer for the Women's Foreign Missionary Society in Shanghai (1917–1918). During the next two years, she was a teacher in the schools of Nanjing, and a district supervisor of schools in Chongqing. In Nanjing, she taught at two schools – a girls boarding school and a boys academy. She met her husband, John Abraham Lewis, who was also a Methodist Missionary in the Upper Yangtze for many years. They got married in 1921. They had one son, John Fulton Lewis, who grew up to become a newspaper editor and author.

After several years, due to illness, she had to leave China. Once back in the United States, she used her Chinese experiences as inspiration for novels and short stories. Her first book, Young Fu of the Upper Yangtze, based on her time as a director of schools in Chungking (Chongqing), won the 1933 Newbery Award and the Lewis Carroll Shelf Award in 1960. She died in Baltimore, Maryland.

== Publications ==
- Young Fu of the Upper Yangtze, 1932
- Ho-Ming, Girl of New China, 1934
- China Quest, 1937
- Portraits from a Chinese Scroll, 1938
- Test Tubes and Dragon Scales, 1940, in collaboration with Dr. George C. Basil
- When the Typhoon Blows, 1942
- To beat a Tiger, One Needs a Brother's Help, 1956
