= Ernst Haffner =

Ernst Haffner was a German social worker, journalist, and novelist whose only known novel, Blood Brothers, originally titled “Jugend auf der Landstrasse Berlin” (“Youth on the Road to Berlin”), was published in 1932 to critical acclaim by Bruno Cassirer and banned by the Nazis one year later. Sometime over the course of World War II, all traces of Haffner were lost, including any professional and personal records that may have helped to indicate what led to his disappearance. There is just a single entry for him in the Berlin registry, where Haffner lived between 1925 and 1933. At the end of the 1930s, it is documented that he was summoned to appear at the Reich Chamber of Literature, after which the details of his life remain unknown.

== Work ==
Published in the last year before Hitler's rise to power, Blood Brothers received a positive review by famed sociologist and philosopher Siegfried Kracauer in the Frankfurter Zeitung upon publication.

The book was subject to the 1933 Nazi book burnings.

Blood Brothers, titled Blutsbrüder in German, was reissued in 2013 by the German publishing house Metrolit Verlag (Berlin) ISBN 9783849300685. The first English edition, titled Blood Brothers, translated by Michael Hofmann was published in 2015.
