= The Causes of Evolution =

1932 book by John Burdon Sanderson Haldane

- Author: J.B.S. Haldane
- Publication date: 1932

The Causes of Evolution is a 1932 book on evolution by J.B.S. Haldane (1990 edition ISBN 0-691-02442-1), based on a series of January 1931 lectures entitled "A Re-examination of Darwinism". It was influential in the founding of population genetics and the modern synthesis.

== Chapters ==
It contains the following chapters:

1. Introduction
2. Variation within a Species
3. The Genetical Analysis of Interspecific Differences
4. Natural Selection
5. What is Fitness?
6. Conclusion

The book also contains an extensive appendix containing the majority of Haldane's mathematical treatment of the subject.

== See also ==
- Evolutionary biology
