= Edith Philips =

American educator and writer

- Born: November 3, 1892; Boston, Massachusetts, U.S.
- Died: July 19, 1983 (aged 90); Crozer-Chester Medical Center, Chester, Pennsylvania, U.S.
- Awards: Guggenheim Fellowship (1928)

Academic background
- Education: Goucher College (B.A., 1913); University of Paris (Ph.D. 1923)
- Thesis: Les réfugiés bonapartistes en Amérique (1815–1830) (1923)

Academic work
- Institutions: Goucher College; Swarthmore College
- Main interests: 18th-century French literature French emigration
- Notable works: The Good Quaker in French Legend

Edith Philips (November 3, 1892 – July 19, 1983) was an American writer and academic of French literature. Her research focused on eighteenth-century French literature and French emigration to the United States. She was a Guggenheim Fellow (1928) and a professor of French at Goucher College and Swarthmore College. In 1932, she published The Good Quaker in French Legend. She served as the acting dean of women at Swarthmore and was later appointed the Susan W. Lippincott Professor of French in 1941. Philips was the founding chair of the Department of Modern Languages at Swarthmore, serving in this position from 1949 to 1960.

== Early life and education ==
Edith Philips was born November 3, 1892, in Boston, Massachusetts to Mary Durham of Yorklyn and Jesse E. Philips of East Nantmeal Township. Her mother was a school teacher who helped assist her husband's operations. Her father served as an instructor of mathematics and was the assistant headmaster for two years at the Rutgers Preparatory School before opening the Philips Tutoring School in West Chester, Pennsylvania, in 1927.

Philips earned a Bachelor of Arts degree in 1913 from Goucher College. She earned a Doctor of Philosophy from University of Paris in 1923. She completed her dissertation entitled Les réfugiés bonapartistes en Amérique (1815-1830).

== Career ==
Philips joined the Goucher College faculty as an assistant professor of French in 1923. She conducted research in France the summer of 1927. Philips was awarded the Guggenheim Fellowship in 1928 to study "the Quaker as a type in French literature, chiefly in the eighteenth century." For her fellowship, she studied in Paris and Russia. In 1930, Philips, then an assistant professor of Romance languages at Goucher, was conducting an "exhaustive study" on French emigration to the United States where she uncovered much on the life of Louis Girardin, the first head of the Maryland Academy of Science and friend of Thomas Jefferson.

Philips started at Swarthmore College in 1930 as an associate professor of French. She became a full professor in 1934. Philips served as the acting dean of women from 1938 to 1939. She was appointed Susan W. Lippincott Professor of French in 1941. Philips was the founding chair of the Swarthmore Department of Modern languages from December 1949 until 1960. She retired in 1961. Philips was subsequently recognized as a professor emerita at Swarthmore.

== Personal life ==
Philips' sister Amy was a director of the Newington Hospital for Crippled Children in Newington, Connecticut. Her brother J. Evan Philips was a private school teacher in St. Louis, Missouri. She died after a surgery at Crozer-Chester Medical Center in Chester, Pennsylvania, on July 19, 1983.

== Selected works ==
=== Books ===
- Philips, Edith (1926). Louis Hue Girardin and Nicholas Gouin Dufief and their relations with Thomas Jefferson: an unknown episode of the French emigration in America. Johns Hopkins University Press.
- Philips, Edith (1926). Poesies Francaises 1860–1925 (in French). New York: F.S. Crofts and Company.
- Philips, Edith (1932). The Good Quaker in French Legend. Philadelphia: University of Pennsylvania Press.
- Becker, George J.; Philips, Edith (1971). Paris and the Arts, 1851-1896. New York: Cornell University Press. ISBN 9780801406553.
