= The Purple Prince of Oz =

1932 book by Ruth Plumly Thompson

- Cover of The Purple Prince of Oz.
- Author: Ruth Plumly Thompson
- Illustrator: John R. Neill
- Language: English
- Series: The Oz Books
- Genre: Children's novel
- Publisher: Reilly & Lee
- Publication date: 1932
- Publication place: United States
- Media type: Print (Hardcover)
- Pages: 281
- Preceded by: Pirates in Oz
- Followed by: Ojo in Oz

The Purple Prince of Oz (1932) is a children's novel, the 26th book in the Oz series created by L. Frank Baum and his successors, and the 12th written by Ruth Plumly Thompson. It was illustrated by John R. Neill. The novel was followed by Ojo in Oz (1933).

While visiting the neighboring kingdom of Pumperdink (incognito), Prince Randy of Regalia criticizes the king's grapes, claiming they are sour. Randy is sentenced to be "dipped" in a purple well, but Kabumpo, the Elegant Elephant, makes him his attendant instead. Later, the royal family of Pumperdink gets enchanted by Kettywig and Faleero, an evil fairy, and Randy and Kabumpo must escape and save the day, with the help of Jinnicky the Red Jinn. At the same time, Randy must earn his crown as Prince of Regalia, by accomplishing the seven challenging tasks required by the law of Regalia.

This is the first of Thompson's Oz books to carry the entire story (except for a bit at the very end) on characters of her own creation. The unpredictable, hot-tempered Red Jinn from Jack Pumpkinhead of Oz returns as a much more pleasant companion to Randy, and soon became a popular character.

The Silver Princess in Oz is a direct sequel to this book, reuniting readers with Randy, Kabumpo, and Jinnicky.

== Reception ==
The Spokane Chronicle wrote, "The new Oz book is brim full of adventure and fun and about the sort of people one can't forget." The Boston Globe agreed, "There are more odd incidents and characters and animals than you can think of to make the book fascinating." The Nashville Banner said, "The story deals with magic of a highly dangerous quality, which of course makes it all the more exciting."

== Copyright status ==
In the United States, the book is expected to enter the public domain on 1 January 2028.

The Oz books
Previous book: Pirates in Oz	The Purple Prince of Oz; 1932	Next book: Ojo in Oz
