= Morab =

American breed of horse

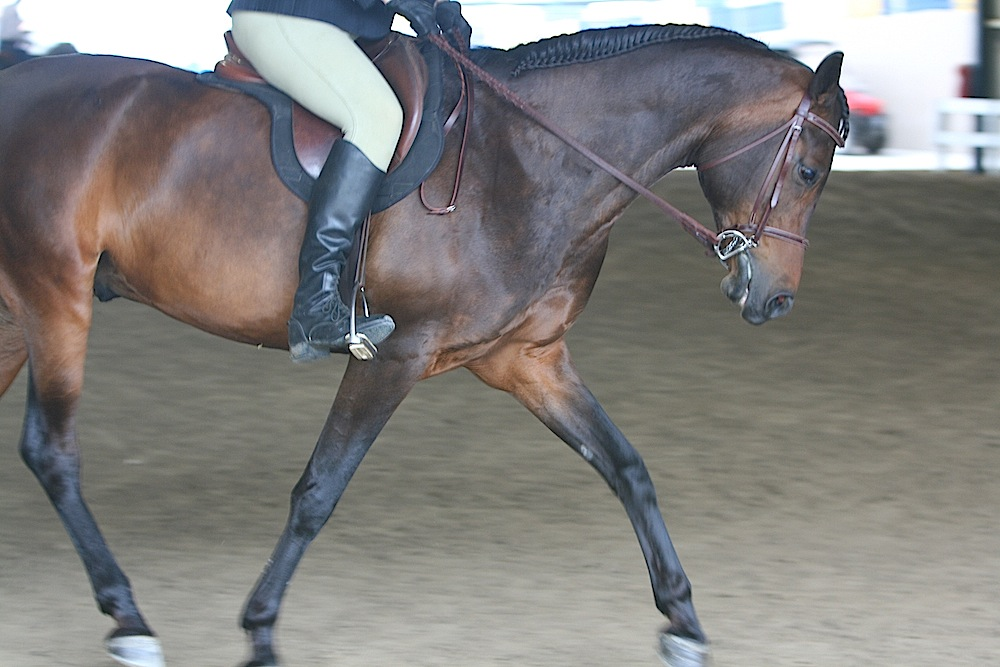
- Country of origin: United States
- Distribution: United States

Traits
- Height: 144–157 cm
- Color: any solid color

The Morab is an American horse resulting from the cross-breeding of Arabian and Morgan horses.

== Characteristics ==
The Morab usually stands between 144 and 157 cm (14.1 and 15.2 hands) at the withers, but may reach 163 cm (16.0 h). It may be of any solid color, including bay, black, chestnut or gray, or sometimes buckskin, palomino or dun.

The head is generally fine, with a broad forehead, large eyes, small ears, and a slightly concave profile. The mane and tail are thick, the tail high-set and often held high.

== Breed history ==
The Morab originated in the late nineteenth century as a result of cross-breeding of Arabian and Morgan horses with the intent of creating a finer carriage horse than the Morgan, but which was still substantial enough for moderate farm labor. The first Morab registry was created in 1973. Prior to this, Morabs were primarily undocumented horses bred for type. Many early Morabs were registered with the American Morgan Horse Association, as the Morgan studbook was still open that time, and these horses have since been fully assimilated into the Morgan breed.

In 2009, several Morab organizations and registries were merged into the Purebred Morab Horse Association (PMHA). Records of breedings included those from the Morab Horse Association & Register (MHA), the North American Horse Registry (WI), the Hearst Memorial Horse Registry (CA), portions of the Morab Registry of America (CA), and the Morab Horse Registry (IL). The older records of the California-based North American Morab Horse Association (NAMHA) were not included in the combined breeders database because the "[NAMHA] pedigrees miss an element of bloodline proof ... as pure Morabs are the goal".

PMHA, established in 1998, operates an open stud book. Along with matings between Morabs, they accept for registration the offspring of first and second generation crosses between purebred Arabians and purebred Morgans. It is required that the parentage of the applicant horse contains only Arabian and Morgan blood, and neither the Arabian nor Morgan blood may fall below the 25% mark. In cases of doubt, DNA tests may be performed to prove parentage.
