= University of Vermont Morgan Horse Farm =

Coordinates: 44.0411°N 73.1833°W

- U.S. National Register of Historic Places
- U.S. Historic district
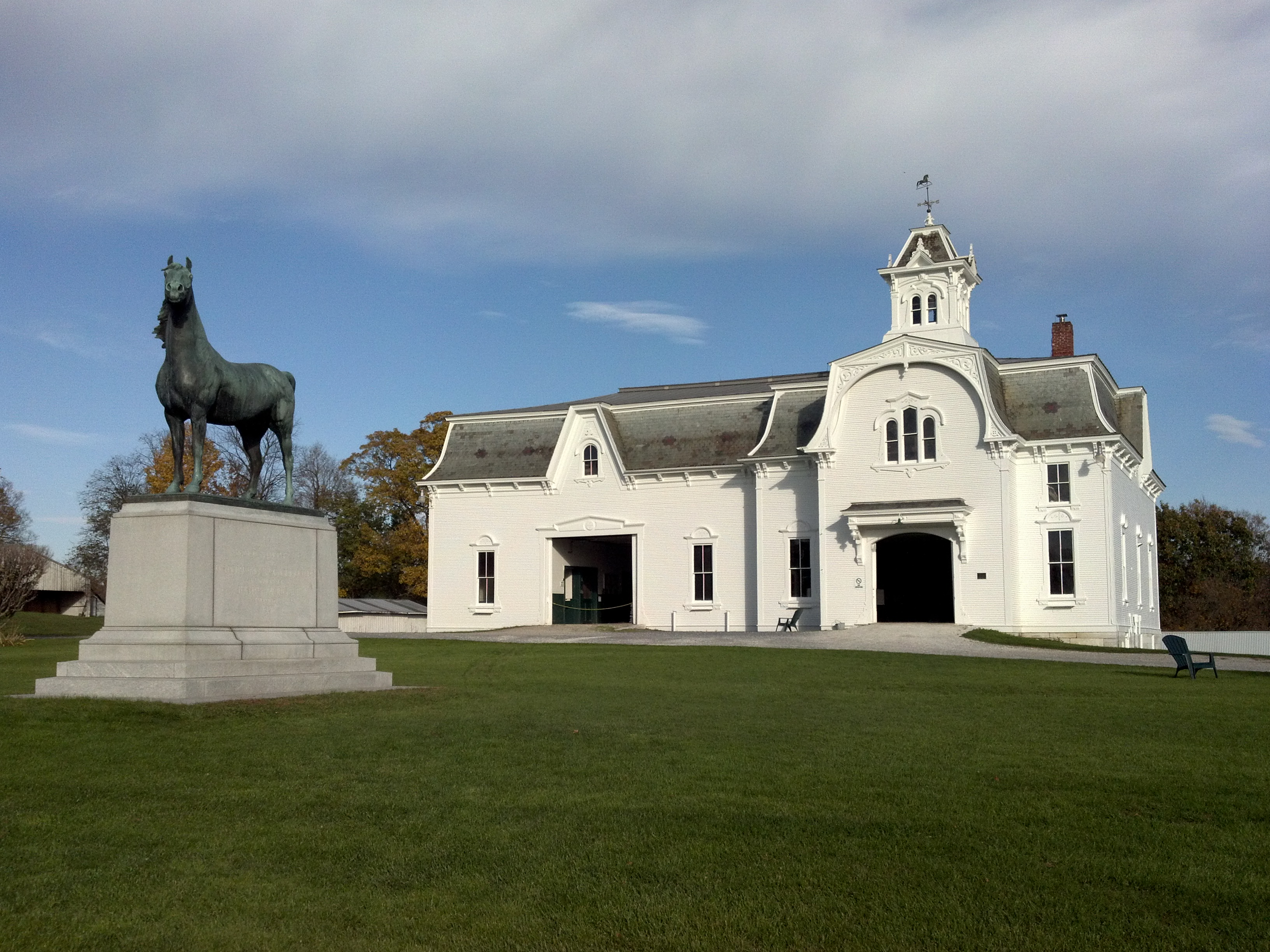

- Location within Vermont
- Location: 74 Battell Dr., Weybridge, Vermont
- Area: 127 acres (51 ha)
- Built: 1907
- Architectural style: Greek Revival, Second Empire, Mansard
- NRHP reference No.: 73000183
- Added to NRHP: April 11, 1973

The Morgan Horse Farm is a historic horse breeding facility at 74 Battell Drive (off Morgan Horse Farm Road) in Weybridge, Vermont. Since 1907, it has been an official breeding site for the Morgan horse, one of the first American-bred horse breeds, and Vermont's official state animal. The breeding program was established in Burlington in 1905, and moved to this site in 1907 by the United States Department of Agriculture, and is now run by the University of Vermont. The farm is listed on the National Register of Historic Places.

== Description and history ==
The Morgan Horse Farm is located on the east side of Morgan Horse Farm Road, on Weybridge's east side, on 127 acres (51 ha) overlooking Otter Creek. A broad lawn separates the farm's main cluster of buildings from the road, prominently featuring a statue of Figure the founding sire of the Morgan horse breed. The property includes a 19th-century mansard-roofed barn with Second Empire styling, and a historic brick Greek Revival house, built for one of the early farmers of the land.

The Morgan horse breed traces its origins to the activities of Justin Morgan, who purchased Figure in the 1790s. The breed saw widespread expansion and use throughout the United States in the 19th century, spawning several other important breeds. In 1905, the United States Department of Agriculture established a breeding program on the campus of the University of Vermont in Burlington. Two years later, it moved to this property, donated by Joseph Battell, founder of the American Morgan Register. The facilities were turned over to the University of Vermont in 1951. The site is a tourist attraction for aficionados of Morgan horses, and continues to be a leader in the development of the breed.

== See also ==
- National Register of Historic Places listings in Addison County, Vermont
