= Justin Morgan Had a Horse =

1945 children's book

- First edition
- Author: Marguerite Henry
- Illustrator: Wesley Dennis
- Language: English
- Publisher: Wilcox & Follett
- Publication date: 1945
- Publication place: United States
- Media type: Print (hardback & paperback)
- ISBN: 978-0689852794

Justin Morgan Had a Horse is an American children's historical novel by Marguerite Henry, illustrated by Wesley Dennis and published by Wilcox & Follett of Chicago in 1945. It concerns the real figures of Justin Morgan and his bay stallion Figure, who lived in Vermont in the late eighteenth century. It was a runner-up for the Newbery Medal in 1946.

An edition was published by Rand McNally in 1954 with new copyrights by both Henry and Dennis. The Library of Congress catalog records report 89 pp. and 169 pp.

== Plot summary ==
The schoolmaster, Justin Morgan, takes two colts as payment for an old debt. The younger of the two grows into a sturdy, though small, riding horse which served as the foundation of the Morgan breed.

== Adaptations ==
In 1972, the book was adapted as a film by Disney Studios and aired on The Wonderful World of Disney. It starred Don Murray as Justin Morgan. John Smith, formerly of the NBC series Laramie, played the part of Mr. Ames, and James Hampton played Aaron.
