= Ellen Feld =

American writer

Ellen Feld is an American author, most notably of children's books about horses, in particular, Morgan horses. Morgan horses are an American horse breed which traces its roots to Figure, also known as Justin Morgan, the first Morgan horse, born in West Springfield, Massachusetts, in 1789.

Feld's work has appeared regularly in such publications as The Morgan Horse Magazine, Stable Management, Just About Horses, Tri-State Horse, Equestrian and The Appaloosa Journal. Feld lives in Massachusetts with her husband, two children (Nick and Holly), seven horses, and assorted pets.

== Works ==
The "Morgan Horse" series (reading level ages 9–13) includes Blackjack: Dreaming of a Morgan Horse and its sequel, Frosty: The Adventures of a Morgan Horse. Both books were selected (in different years) as winners of Children's Choices, an award co-sponsored by the International Reading Association and The Children's Book Council. In 2007, Breyer Model Horses selected Blackjack: Dreaming of a Morgan Horse to be packaged with one of their model horses. Both books were adopted by Renaissance Learning for their Accelerated Reader program.

The third and fourth books in the Morgan Horse series are titled Rusty: The High-Flying Morgan Horse and Robin: The Lovable Morgan Horse. "Rusty" was also added to the Renaissance Learning Accelerated Reader program. Both "Rusty" and "Robin" have received the Adding Wisdom Award from Parent to Parent, an organization dedicated to recognizing excellence in children's products. In December 2006, this organization further honored these books by selecting Robin as one of their top 20 children's products of 2006, and Rusty as one of their top 100 products.

The fifth book in the series is Annie: The Mysterious Morgan Horse. Annie won a bronze medal in the Moonbeam Children's Book Awards and was a semi-finalist in the Reader Views Literary Awards.

The sixth book in the "Morgan Horse" series is "Rimfire: The Barrel Racing Morgan Horse". It was published in the 2009 and was selected by 'Tack 'n Togs' magazine as one of the 'Best New Products of 2009.'

The seventh book in the "Morgan Horse" series is "The Further Adventures of Blackjack: The Champion Morgan Horse," published in 2012. The same year, a photo book of the real horses behind the series, "Meet the Morgans" was also produced.

Author Feld has published five titles for younger children: "Shadow: The Curious Morgan Horse," "Justin Morgan and the Big Horse Race," "Blackjack: The Magical Morgan Horse," "What Can I Do? A Donkey-Donk Story," and "What Does A Police Horse Do?" The first three books are 32-page full-color hardcover books for readers aged 5 to 7. "Shadow" is a fictional story about a young foal who goes on an adventure, "Justin Morgan" is a historical fiction book about a real race that the famous horse participated in. This race is still celebrated each year in Vermont with the 'Morgan Mile Trotting Races,' which is held on the same stretch of road that Justin Morgan raced over 200 years ago, in Brookfield, Vermont, and "Blackjack: The Magical Morgan Horse" is a story of a horse from a child's drawing coming to life. "What Can I Do? A Donkey-Donk Story" and "What Does A Police Horse Do?" use photos of real horses to tell stories about real horses/donkeys.
