= King of the Wind (film) =

1990 film by Peter Duffell

- Directed by: Peter Duffell
- Produced by: Guy Collins; Peter S. Davis; Patrick Dromgoole; Johnny Goodman; Michael Guest; William N. Panzer; Paul Sarony
- Starring: Richard Harris; Glenda Jackson
- Cinematography: Brian Morgan
- Edited by: Lyndon Matthews
- Music by: John Scott
- Distributed by: Enterprise Pictures Limited
- Release date: 1990
- Country: United Kingdom
- Language: English

King of the Wind is a 1990 British adventure film directed by Peter Duffell and starring Richard Harris, Glenda Jackson and Frank Finlay. It is based on the novel King of the Wind by Marguerite Henry. The film depicts the life of the Godolphin Arabian, an Arab colt in 18th-century Kingdom of Great Britain.

== Cast ==
- Richard Harris as King George II
- Glenda Jackson as Queen Caroline
- Frank Finlay as Edward Coke
- Jenny Agutter as Hannah Coke
- Nigel Hawthorne as Achmet
- Navin Chowdhry as Agba
- Anthony Quayle as Lord Granville
- Peter Vaughan as Captain
- Ian Richardson as Bey of Tunis
- Neil Dickson as Earl of Godolphin
- Barry Foster as Mr. Williams
- Jill Gascoine as Mrs. Williams
- Ralph Bates as LeDuc
- Joan Hickson as Duchess of Marlborough
- Norman Rodway as Capt. 'Blueskin' Blake
- Melvyn Hayes as Twicker
- Hilton McRae as Cook
- Barry Stanton as Chef Richard
- Dicken Ashworth as Woodcarter
- Ben Aris as Squire Dunn
- Paul Spurrier as King Louis XV
- Richard Ridings as Jailer
- Terence Conoley as Cardinal
- Paul Sarony as French Ambassador
- Suzy Cooper as Lady Granville
- Jeremy Hodge as Teenage Gang Leader
- Courtney Roper-Knight as Rusty Williams
- John Forgeham as Blacksmith

== See also ==
- List of films about horses
