= Brighty of the Grand Canyon =

1953 children's novel and film

- First edition
- Author: Marguerite Henry
- Illustrator: Wesley Dennis
- Language: English
- Publisher: Rand McNally (1953); Aladdin Paperbacks (1991)
- Publication date: November 1953
- Publication place: United States
- Pages: 222
- ISBN: 978-0-689-71485-6 (second printing)
- OCLC: 305533

Brighty of the Grand Canyon
- Theatrical release poster
- Directed by: Norman Foster
- Screenplay by: Norman Foster
- Based on: Brighty of the Grand Canyon by Marguerite Henry
- Produced by: Stephen F. Booth for Stephen F. Booth Productions
- Starring: Joseph Cotten; Pat Conway; Dick Foran; Karl Swenson; Dandy Curran
- Cinematography: Ted Saizis; Vincent Saizis
- Edited by: Joseph Dervin
- Music by: Phyllis Lavsky; Richard Lavsky
- Distributed by: Feature Film Corporation of America
- Release date: July 1967
- Running time: 89 minutes
- Language: English

Brighty of the Grand Canyon is a 1953 children's novel by Marguerite Henry and a 1967 film of the same name based on the novel. They present a fictionalized account of a real-life burro named "Brighty", who lived in the Grand Canyon of the Colorado River from about 1892 to 1922.

== Book and film ==
Henry penned her novel after she read an article about Brighty in Sunset magazine. It won the 1956 William Allen White Children's Book Award.

Thomas McKee, the former manager of Wiley's Camp on the North Rim of the Canyon, read Henry's novel and wrote to express his interest in the book. McKee told Henry that his son, Bob, was Brighty's closest companion. He sent Henry a photograph of young Bob McKee sitting on Brighty's back. Bob became the composite character Homer Hobbs, played in the film by Dandy Curran.

The other film characters include Old Timer, a prospector played by Dick Foran, and Uncle Jim Owen, a man of the Old West played by Joseph Cotten. Pat Conway appears as Jake Irons, who murders Old Timer for his copper ore. Uncle Jim then proceeds to help bring Irons to justice. Theodore Roosevelt was played by Karl Swenson. Parts of the film were shot at the Colorado River in Utah and the Grand Canyon in Arizona.

== Statue ==
Brighty was honored with a bronze statue in the lobby of Grand Canyon Lodge, located near the terminus of Arizona State Route 67 approximately 43 miles (69 km) south of the junction with U.S. Route 89A. The sculpture was made by artist Peter Jepsen. The statue was recovered (with damage) from a fire that destroyed the lodge in July 2025.

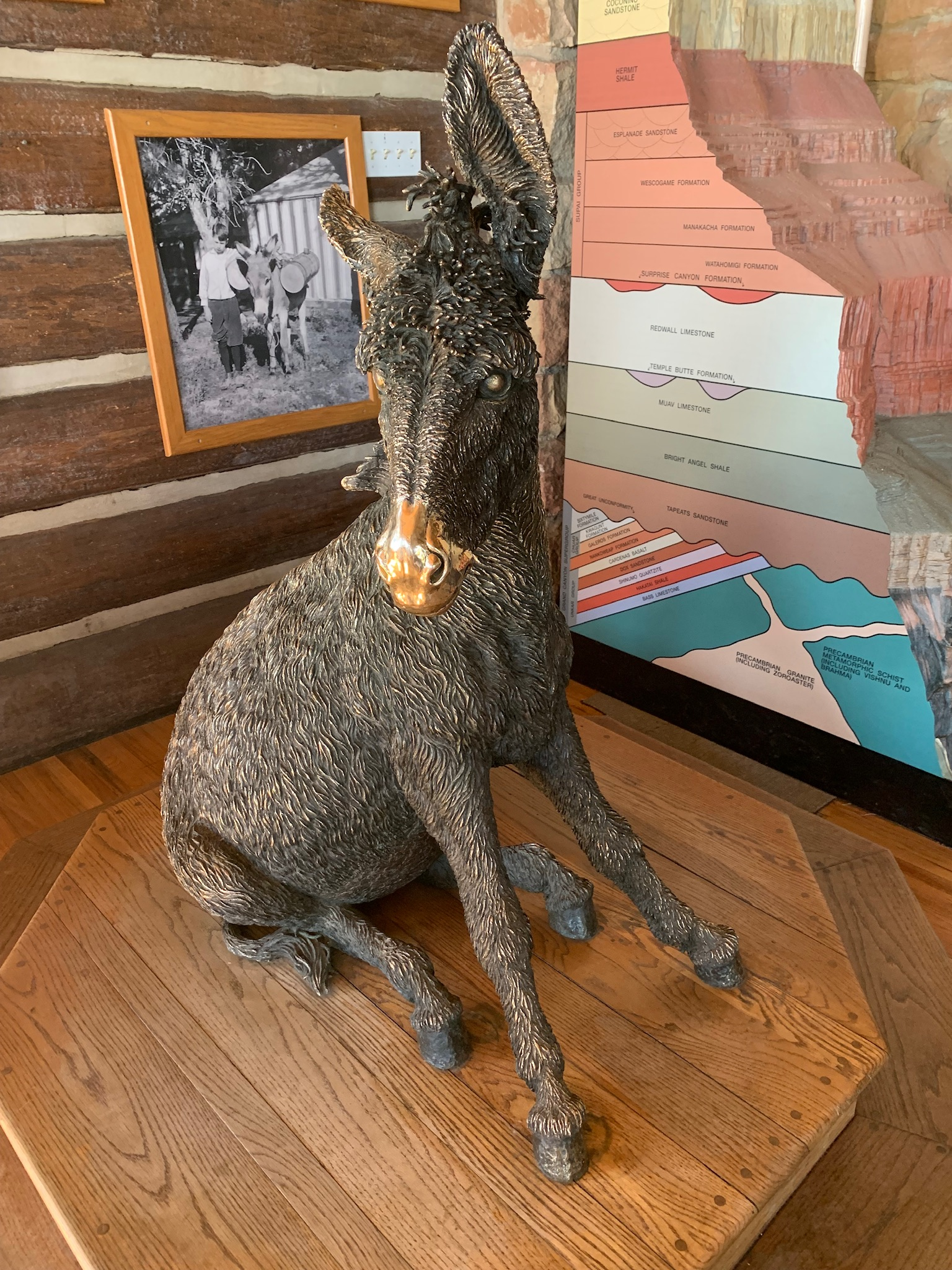
Statue of Brighty in the Grand Canyon Lodge in 2019

== See also ==
- Platero
