= King of the Wind =

1948 novel by Marguerite Henry

- First edition
- Author: Marguerite Henry
- Illustrator: Wesley Denis
- Language: English
- Publisher: Rand McNally
- Publication date: 1948
- Publication place: United States
- Media type: Print (hardback & paperback)
- ISBN: 0-7862-2848-2 (reissue)

King of the Wind is a novel by Marguerite Henry that won the Newbery Medal for excellence in American children's literature in 1949. It was made into a film of the same name in 1990.

== Plot ==
As the fast of Ramadan is ending in Morocco, Agba, a mute slave boy, tends to his favorite Arabian mare, who gives birth that night. The colt has a white spot on his hind heel, considered the emblem of swiftness and good luck, but it also has a wheat ear on his chest, symbolizing bad luck. The mare dies within a few days, but Sham matures into a promising racehorse. Later, the Sultan summons six horseboys to his palace, including Agba, and charges them to accompany six horses to France. The horses are to be given as gifts to the French King Louis XV. The horseboy is to remain with that horse until the horse's death, then return to Morocco.

When the racehorses arrive in France, they are frowned and laughed upon by the French, who believe that they are not 'lusty' enough to be racehorses. Sham becomes a kitchen horse, but he is so disobedient that the cook sells him to a carter. Agba becomes a servant to Sham's new owner and meets Grimalkin the cat along the way.

Sham is bought by a Quaker man and taken to England. When Sham refuses to let the Quaker's nephew ride him, his owner sells him to an inn. Agba is jailed when he is caught sneaking into the inn to see Sham, but the Quaker's housekeeper bails him out, and both Sham and Agba are released into the service of the Earl of Godolphin.

The Earl treats Sham as a workhorse, albeit kindly. A mare Lady Roxana, meant to be a mate for the horse Hobgoblin, arrives. Sham successfully fights Hobgoblin for her. She enjoys Sham's company, but the Earl is embarrassed by the incident. He orders Sham, Agba, and Grimalkin to live in Wicken Fen, and they depart.

Two years later, the Earl's Chief Groom comes to see Agba and reveals that Lady Roxana gave birth to Sham's son Lath, who was left untrained. One day, Lath jumped a fence and outran some of the colts that the Earl was training. The trio return to Godolphin, and Sham is named the Godolphin Arabian. After the Earl reveals that he is near bankruptcy, they race Sham's sons at Newmarket. The sons win the races and the Queen's purse, thus repairing the Earl's fortunes and establishing Sham as one of the founding stallions of English track racing.

Awards
Preceded by The Twenty-One Balloons	Newbery Medal recipient 1949	Succeeded by The Door in the Wall
