= Wesley Dennis (illustrator) =

American illustrator (1903–1966)

- Born: John Wesley Dennis; May 16, 1903; Falmouth, Massachusetts
- Died: September 3, 1966 (aged 63) (Note: Some sources give date of death September 5, 1966. An obituary or death notice published in The New York Times reports that Dennis "died Saturday", which was September 3 in 1966. Probably it was published Monday, September 5.); Falmouth, Massachusetts
- Known for: Children's book illustration

John Wesley Dennis (May 16, 1903 – September 3, 1966) was an American illustrator, known best for fifteen children's books about horses that he created in collaboration with writer Marguerite Henry. He illustrated over 150 books in his lifetime, including Anna Sewell's Black Beauty and John Steinbeck's The Red Pony. He also wrote and illustrated a few books of his own, among which are Flip, Flip and the Cows, Flip and the Morning, and Tumble.

== Biography ==
Dennis was born on May 16, 1903, in Falmouth, Massachusetts. He grew up on a farm on Cape Cod. He and his older brother Morgan both learned to draw specializing in farm animals, with preference for horses and dogs respectively.

Dennis failed the US Naval Academy entrance exam and dropped out of school at age 17. He looked for work in Boston, where Morgan was a newspaper illustrator with the Boston Herald, and got a similar job at the Boston American by showing some of Morgan's work as his own. He found illustration jobs with several department stores, including Jordan Marsh and Filene's. He did not intend to become an artist. "Most of my new friends were spending the mornings at the Boston Museum of Fine Arts drawing from plaster casts. They wanted to be artists. They usually were broke." However, Morgan convinced him to try to make a living drawing horses. Dennis began by sketching racetrack winners, hoping to receive portrait commissions from the owners. This brought some success. He decided to further his education, and traveled to France to study with artist Lowes Dalbiac Luard, an expert on horse anatomy.

In 1940, Dennis married Dorothy Schiller Boggs.

In 1941, he published his first book, Flip, a "fanciful story about a pony named Flip and his desire to jump the brook." His illustrations attracted author Marguerite Henry, who later wrote, "I had just finished writing Justin Morgan Had a Horse, and wanted the best horse artist in the world to illustrate it. So I went to the library, studied the horse books, and immediately fell in love with the work of Will James and Wesley Dennis. When I found out that Will James was dead, I sent my manuscript to Wesley Dennis." Thus began a 20-year collaboration which resulted in the publication of 15 books. (Below there are 20 listings of books "written by Marguerite Henry", including two editions of Justin Morgan.)

Also in 1941, Dennis visited Warrenton, Virginia. He purchased a farm there and made it his primary residence.

Dennis was a resident of Warrenton at the time of his death in Falmouth at age 63. Falmouth was a summer residence. He had been ill for six months. He had suffered a heart attack.

== Reissues ==
During 2014 Simon & Schuster initiated a reissue of "deluxe hardcover editions of 20 of Henry's novels. The books feature a uniform cover look, and many include Wesley Dennis's original art, digitally refreshed." The deal was arranged by an agent for the University of Minnesota, which inherited Henry's rights. The agent told Publishers Weekly that Henry had "shared all royalties from the books with Dennis, which is highly unusual", and that the Dennis estate will receive royalties from the new editions. Some of his illustrations had been dropped from latterday paperback editions. He sold most of the originals, which are thus unavailable today; the publisher says it is "cleaning up the artwork digitally to create as clean a scan as we can, working from existing reproductions."

== Books ==
=== Written by Marguerite Henry ===
The Henry–Dennis collaborations were published by Rand McNally except as noted.

- Justin Morgan Had a Horse (Wilcox & Follett, 1945), 89 pp., LCCN agr45000372
- Always Reddy (McGraw-Hill Whittlesey House, 1947); also published as Shamrock Queen
- Benjamin West and His Cat Grimalkin (Bobbs-Merrill, 1947) – "by Marguerite Henry and Wesley Dennis", LCCN 86-28658; about the artist Benjamin West, OCLC 300163
- Misty of Chincoteague (1947)
- King of the Wind: the Story of the Godolphin Arabian (1948)
- Little-or-Nothing from Nottingham (Whittlesey House, 1949)
- Sea Star, Orphan of Chincoteague (1949)
- Born To Trot (1950) – about the standardbred line
- Album of Horses (1951)
- Brighty of the Grand Canyon (1953)
- Justin Morgan Had a Horse (revised and expanded, Rand McNally, 1954), 169 pp., LCCN 54-8903
- Wagging Tails: Album of Dogs (1955)
- Cinnabar, the One O'Clock Fox (1956)
- Black Gold (1957) – about the horse Black Gold
- Muley-Ears, Nobody's Dog (1959)
- All About Horses, with drawings by Wesley Dennis and photos (1962)
- Five O'Clock Charlie (1962)
- Stormy, Misty's Foal (1963)
- Portfolio of Horse Paintings, with commentary by Henry (1964) – "Published in 1952 under title: Portfolio of horses." LCCN 64-22279

Portfolio of Horses (1952) LCCN 52-10418 – page-counts and plate-counts do not match the 1964 book

- White Stallion of Lipizza (1964) – about the Vienna Spanish Riding School

Some of the books have also appeared without the Dennis illustrations. Beginning 2014 Simon & Schuster reissues a series of Marguerite Henry novels in "deluxe hardcover editions" with illustrations by Wesley Dennis, where applicable, digitally refreshed from existing reproductions. The first six volumes in the series are Henry–Dennis collaborations: King of the Wind, Brighty, and White Stallion (late 2014); Justin Morgan, Sea Star, and Stormy (early 2015).

=== Other books illustrated ===
- Serpent’s Credo, written by George Faunce Whitcomb (1931)
- Flip, written by Dennis (1941)
- Flip and the Cows, Dennis (1942)
- Riders of the Gabilans, Graham M. Dean (1944)
- The Red Pony, John Steinbeck (1945)
- Holiday, Dennis (1946)
- Golden Sovereign, Dorothy Lyons (1946)
- Black Beauty, the autobiography of a horse, Anna Sewell (1946) [1877]
- Now Listen, Warden, Ray P. Holland (1946)
- Old Bones: The Wonder Horse by Mildred Mastin Pace (1956)
- Palomino and other horses, edited by Dennis (1950)
- Summerfield Farm, Mary Martin Black (1951)
- Flip and the Morning, Dennis (1951)
- Fools Over Horses, Helen Orr Watson (1952)
- Lord Buff and The Silver Star, George Agnew Chamberlain (1955)
- Crow I Know, Dennis (1957)
- Tony the Pony, Lilian Moore (1959)
- Cammie's Choice, Jane McIlvaine [McClary] (1961)
- Cammie's Challenge, Jane McIlvaine [McClary] (1962)
- A Horse Called Mystery, Marjorie Reynolds (1964)
- Book of Ponies, Suzanne Wilding (1965)
- Ice Bird, a Christmas legend, Pauline B. Innis (1965)
- Small War of Sergeant Donkey, Maureen Daly (1966)
- Tumble, the story of a mustang, Dennis (1966)
