= Ethan Allen (horse) =

American Morgan racehorse and sire

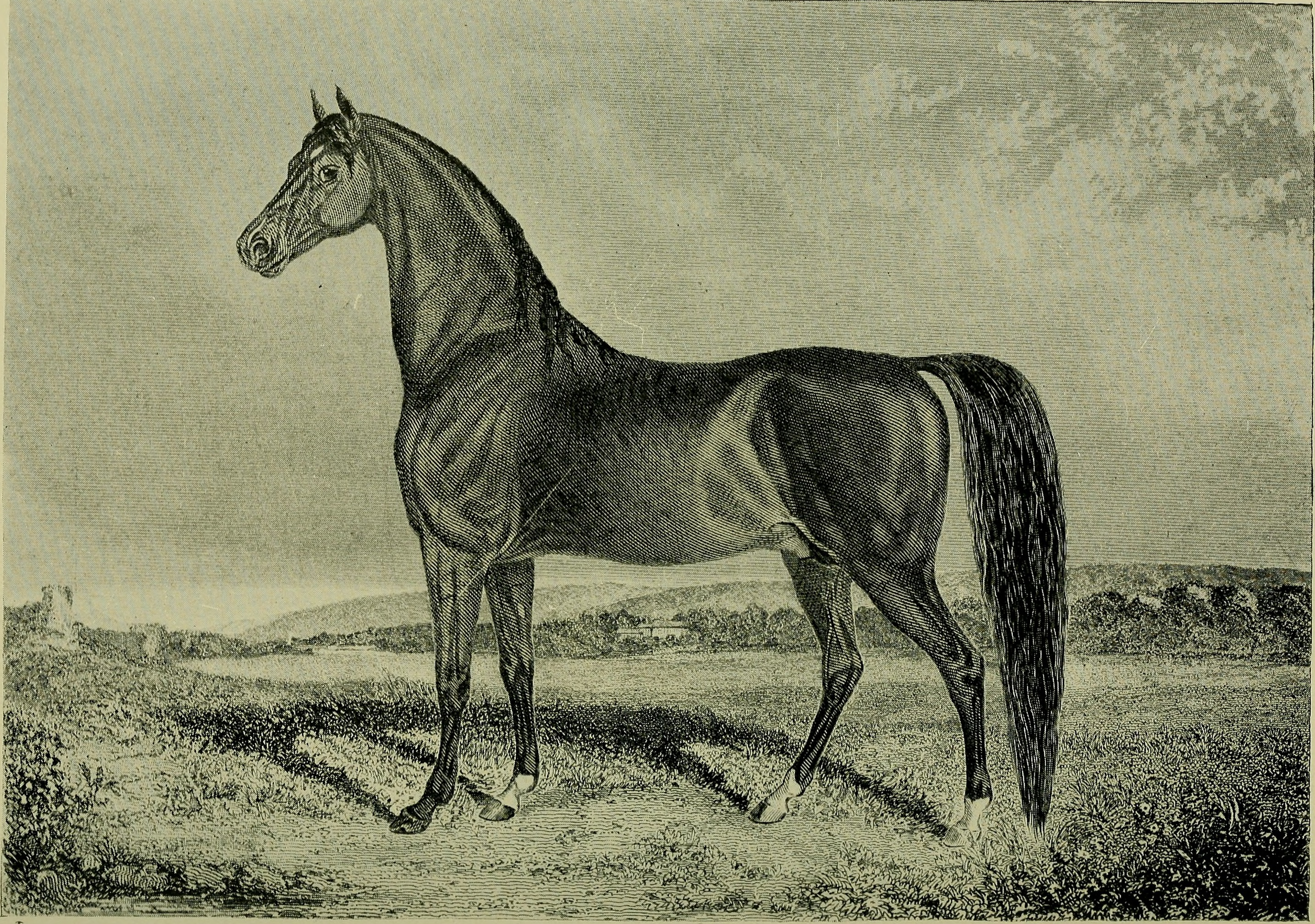
- Breed: Morgan
- Discipline: Harness racing
- Sire: Black Hawk
- Dam: Unnamed mare
- Maternal grandsire: Red Robin
- Sex: Stallion
- Foaled: 1849
- Country: United States
- Color: Bay
- Breeder: Joel W. Holcomb

Ethan Allen (June 18, 1849 – September 10, 1876) was an influential Morgan horse sire and trotting racehorse.

== Life ==
Ethan Allen was foaled June 18, 1849. He was sired by Black Hawk and out of an unnamed gray mare who was herself sired by Red Robin, a son of Figure. Ethan Allen was bred by Joel W. Holcomb of Ticonderoga, New York. Ethan Allen was a bay with three white socks and a white star on his forehead. He stood around 15 hands (60 inches, 152 cm) and weighed 1,000 pounds (450 kg) at maturity. Ethan Allen was the champion trotter of his time; he trotted the mile in 2:25. He was owned by multiple owners, and during 1866 and 1868 he stood at stud in Boston for a fee of $100. He sired approximately 72 foals in his lifetime, of which only two were fillies. He was featured in several Currier and Ives prints and was the model for a popular trotting horse weathervane. Ethan Allen died in Lawrence, Kansas on September 10, 1876 at the age of 28, and was buried there with a marker over his grave. Later, he was exhumed and his articulated skeleton was put on display in the museum there.

== Sire line tree ==
- Ethan Allen
  - Honest Allen
    - Denning Allen
      - General Gates
        - Autumn
        - Victor
        - Red Oak
        - Scotland
        - Ben Lomond
        - Bennington
        - Castor
        - Dewey
        - Gladstone
        - Linsley
  - Daniel Lambert
    - Colonel Moulton
    - Jubilee Lambert
      - Jubilee De Jarnette
        - Jupitor
        - The Admiral
        - Troubadour
        - Quintessence
        - Tyee
    - Lambert Chief
      - Lambert Boy
        - Clarion
    - Aristos
      - H B Winship
      - St Julian
    - Addison Lambert
    - Ben Franklin
      - Jasper Franklin
        - Allen Franklin
      - Aureolus
        - Selim
    - Motion
    - Cobden
      - Cobden Jr
        - Star Allen
      - Cobden S
        - Cobden S Jr
    - Star Ethan
      - Allen
        - H M Stanley
    - Thought
    - Lambert B
      - Madison Lambert
  - Ethan Allen (Holabird)
  - Superb
  - Ethan Allen (Woodward)

== Pedigree ==
Pedigree of Ethan Allen, bay stallion, 1849
Sire Black Hawk 1833	Sherman Morgan*; 1808	Figure (Justin Morgan)*^ 1789	True Briton
Sire Black Hawk 1833	Sherman Morgan*; 1808	Figure (Justin Morgan)*^ 1789	Diamond mare
Sire Black Hawk 1833	Sherman Morgan*; 1808	Fisk mare* 1798	Diamond
Sire Black Hawk 1833	Sherman Morgan*; 1808	Fisk mare* 1798	Sportsman mare
Sire Black Hawk 1833	Queen of the Neck; 1825	Captain Absolute; 1821	Clavileno
Sire Black Hawk 1833	Queen of the Neck; 1825	Captain Absolute; 1821	Pioneer Constitution mare
Sire Black Hawk 1833	Queen of the Neck; 1825	Saunder's mare by Nb; 181?	Lofty
Sire Black Hawk 1833	Queen of the Neck; 1825	Saunder's mare by Nb; 181?	Wildair mare
Dam Poll 1835	Morgan Robin; 1821	Sherman Morgan*; 1808	Figure (Justin Morgan)*^
Dam Poll 1835	Morgan Robin; 1821	Sherman Morgan*; 1808	Fisk mare*
Dam Poll 1835	Morgan Robin; 1821	Chamberlain mare 1817	Figure (Justin Morgan)*^
Dam Poll 1835	Morgan Robin; 1821	Chamberlain mare 1817	(unknown)
Dam Poll 1835	Bemis mare 1820	Grey Stallion; 1816	Bullrush Morgan^
Dam Poll 1835	Bemis mare 1820	Grey Stallion; 1816	Grey mare
Dam Poll 1835	Bemis mare 1820	Dr Chandler mare 1805	Figure (Justin Morgan)*^
Dam Poll 1835	Bemis mare 1820	Dr Chandler mare 1805	(unknown)

* Ethan Allen is inbred 2S × 3D to the stallion Sherman Morgan, meaning that he appears second generation on the sire side of his pedigree, and third on the dam side of his pedigree.

^ Ethan Allen is inbred 3S × 4D x 4D x 5D x 4D to the stallion Figure (Justin Morgan), meaning that he appears third generation on the sire side of his pedigree, fourth generation thrice on the dam side of his pedigree, and fifth generation once (via Bulrush Morgan) on the dam side of his pedigree.
