= Black Hawk (horse) =

Morgan sire (1833–1856)

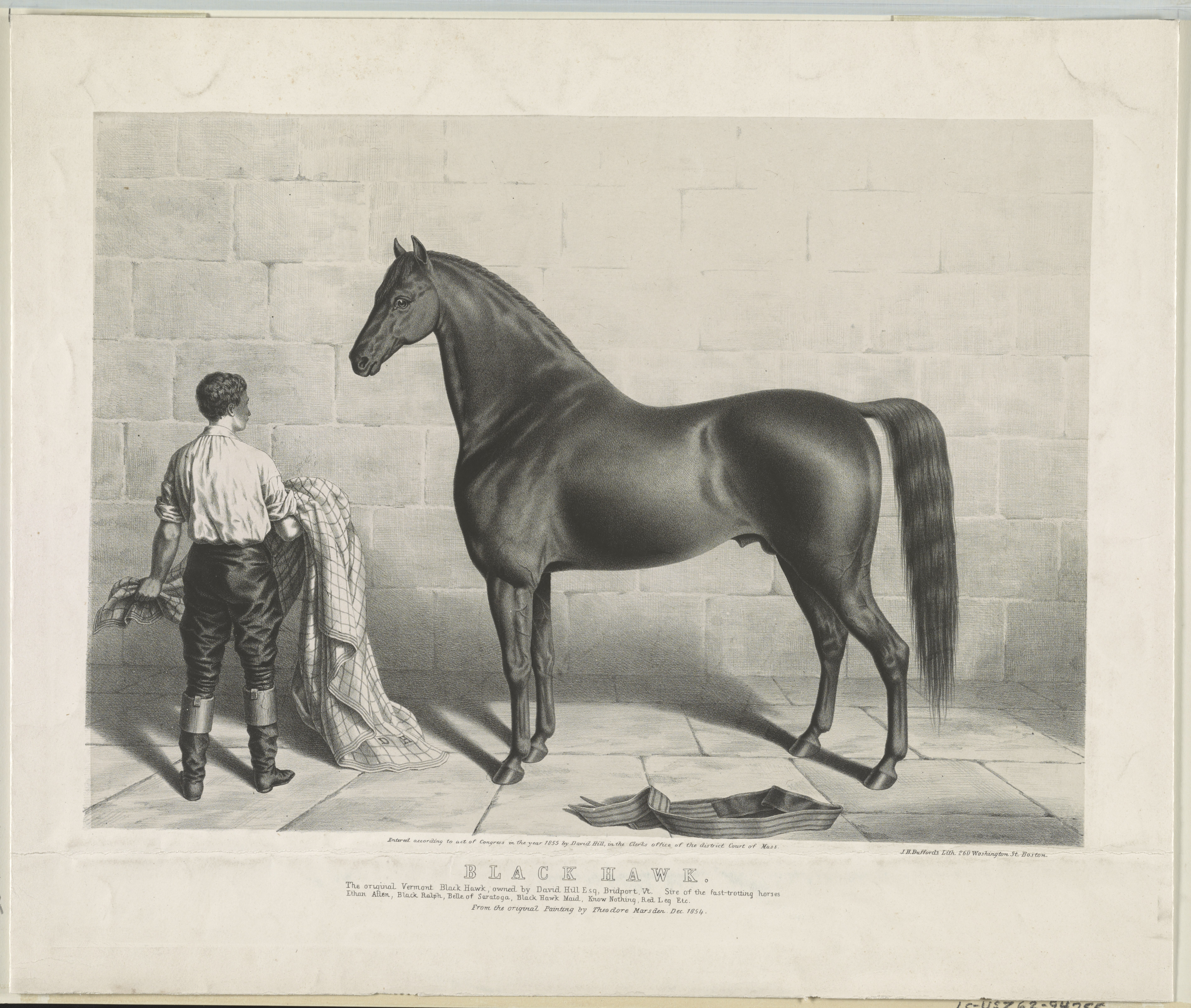
- J.H. Bufford's lithograph. Original painting by Theodore Marsden
- Breed: Morgan
- Discipline: Driving
- Sire: Sherman Morgan
- Sex: Stallion
- Foaled: 1833
- Country: United States
- Color: Black
- Breeder: Benjamin Kelly
- Owner: David Hill

Black Hawk (1833–1856) was an influential Morgan horse sire. All Morgan horses alive today have multiple pedigree crosses to this stallion. He has more influence on the Morgan breed than any other horse other than the foundation sire of the breed, Justin Morgan.

== Life ==
Black Hawk was foaled in April 1833. He was sired by Sherman Morgan and out of Queen of the Neck who was reputed to be half Thoroughbred. He was a solid black stallion with no white markings, standing 15 hands (60 inches, 152 cm) high. Black Hawk was bred by Benjamin Kelly, and owned by Ezekiel Twombly, both of Durham, New Hampshire. Black Hawk was sold multiple times during his early years, and in 1844 he was sold for $800 to his final owner, David Hill of Bridport, Vermont. During his years with Hill, he sired 1,772 foals, one of which, Ethan Allen, himself became well known as a sire. Black Hawk was trained to harness and according to his various owners, often driven 50 miles in one day. Black Hawk died on December 1, 1856.

== Race career ==
His early race records were not preserved. In 1842, he won $1,000 by trotting 5 miles in 16 minutes at Cambridge Park Course. In 1843 he won three two-mile races in 5 minutes 43 seconds, 5 minutes 48 seconds, and 5 minutes 47 seconds. He also won a one-mile race in 2 minutes 42 seconds. In 1847, he competed in a best-of-three series against the Morse Horse, winning two races in the following times: 2:50 1/2 and 2:43 1/2. It was the last regular race he competed in.

== Stud record ==
Black Hawk began his stud career as early as age two. During the period from 1844 through 1856, he covered 1,772 mares. At the 1859 St. Louis World’s Fair, five of the six leading roadster stallions were sons of Black Hawk.

Some of his best progeny as runners included Ethan Allen, Black Ralph, Lancet, Belle of Saratoga, Black Hawk Maid, and Flying Cloud. His sire line survives today primarily through three sons: Ethan Allen, Sherman Black Hawk, and Benedict’s Pathfinder.

== Sire line tree ==
- Black Hawk
  - Black Ralph
  - Kossuth
  - Selim
  - Sherman Black Hawk
    - Vermont Hero
      - General Knox
        - Uncle Shube
        - Gilbreth Knox
        - Bismarck (Howe)
        - Sagadahoc
        - Phil Sheridan
        - Whalebone Knox
        - Black Sultan
        - General Lightfoot
        - Eastern Boy
        - Victor
        - General Washington
    - King Herod
      - Herod
        - Hercules
      - King Herod Jr
        - Captain Herod
  - Ticonderoga
    - Black Prince
  - Vermont Black Hawk (Blood)
    - Black Hawk (Gist)
    - Indian Chief
    - Blood Chief
  - Black Hawk (Hill)
    - Ti Boy
  - Paul Clifford
  - Rounds Horse
    - Darkey
  - Black Hawk (Chris Doyle)
    - Grey Eagle
  - Flying Cloud
    - Star of the West
  - Stockbridge Chief
    - Mambrino Black Hawk
    - Stockbridge Chief Jr
      - Abe Edgington
  - Ethan Allen
    - Honest Allen
      - Denning Allen
        - General Gates
    - Daniel Lambert
      - Colonel Moulton
      - Jubilee Lambert
        - Jubilee De Jarnette
      - Lambert Chief
        - Lambert Boy
      - Aristos
        - H B Winship
        - St Julian
      - Addison Lambert
      - Ben Franklin
        - Jasper Franklin
        - Aureolus
      - Motion
      - Cobden
        - Cobden Jr
        - Cobden S
      - Star Ethan
        - Allen
      - Thought
      - Lambert B
        - Madison Lambert
    - Ethan Allen (Holabird)
    - Superb
    - Ethan Allen (Woodward)
  - Gray Eagle (b.1849)
  - Lancet
  - Telegraph (Bradford)
  - Bay State
  - Black Hawk (Smith)
  - Trotting Childers
  - Wild-air
  - Chieftain
    - Young Rix
  - Vermont (Downing)
  - Gray Eagle (b.1852)
    - Grey Eagle
  - Black Hawk Telegraph
    - Strideaway
  - Pathfinder (Benedict)
    - Pathfinder (Buell)
      - Pathfinder Jr
        - Goldfinder
  - Rienzi
  - Illinois Black Hawk
    - Morgan Eclipse

== Pedigree ==
Pedigree of Black Hawk, black stallion, 1833
Sire Sherman Morgan 1808	Figure (Justin Morgan); 1789	True Briton; 1780	Traveller (Lloyd)
Sire Sherman Morgan 1808	Figure (Justin Morgan); 1789	True Briton; 1780	Betty Leeds
Sire Sherman Morgan 1808	Figure (Justin Morgan); 1789	Diamond mare 1784	Diamond
Sire Sherman Morgan 1808	Figure (Justin Morgan); 1789	Diamond mare 1784	Sportsman mare
Sire Sherman Morgan 1808	Fisk mare 1798	Eclipse (Hall); 1778	Eclipse
Sire Sherman Morgan 1808	Fisk mare 1798	Eclipse (Hall); 1778	Phoebe
Sire Sherman Morgan 1808	Fisk mare 1798	Bellow's mare by Ranger or son 178?	Lindsay's Arabian
Sire Sherman Morgan 1808	Fisk mare 1798	Bellow's mare by Ranger or son 178?	(unknown)
Dam Queen of the Neck 1825	Captain Absolute; 1821	Clavileno; 1813	Sorcerer
Dam Queen of the Neck 1825	Captain Absolute; 1821	Clavileno; 1813	Bonny Lass
Dam Queen of the Neck 1825	Captain Absolute; 1821	Pioneer Constitution mare 181?	Pioneer
Dam Queen of the Neck 1825	Captain Absolute; 1821	Pioneer Constitution mare 181?	Constitution mare
Dam Queen of the Neck 1825	Saunder's mare from Nb; 181?	Lofty; 181?	Wildair (Saunders)*
Dam Queen of the Neck 1825	Saunder's mare from Nb; 181?	Lofty; 181?	Old Doll*
Dam Queen of the Neck 1825	Saunder's mare from Nb; 181?	Wildair mare 180?	Wildair (Saunders)*
Dam Queen of the Neck 1825	Saunder's mare from Nb; 181?	Wildair mare 180?	Old Doll*

* Black Hawk is inbred 4D × 4D to the stallion Wildair (Saunders), meaning that he appears twice fourth generation on the dam side of his pedigree.

* Black Hawk is inbred 4D × 4D to the mare Old Doll, meaning that she appears twice fourth generation on the dam side of his pedigree.
