= American Morgan Horse Association =

Equine registry

- Location within Kentucky American Morgan Horse Association (the United States)
- Abbreviation: AMHA
- Predecessor: Morgan Horse Club
- Formation: 1909; 117 years ago
- Purpose: Register and promote Morgan horses
- Headquarters: 4037 Iron Works Parkway, Suite 130, Lexington, Kentucky 40511
- Coordinates: 38.14709713445013°N 84.51529330483591°W
- Services: Breed registry
- Publication: The Morgan Horse
- Affiliations: USDF, USEF, WDAA, 50 recognized clubs, 20 youth clubs
- Website: morganhorse.com

The American Morgan Horse Association (AMHA) is a horse breed registry for the Morgan horse, founded in 1909, and is a membership and service organization for Morgan horse breeders and owners. Its offices are located at the Kentucky Horse Park in Lexington, Kentucky. AMHA has published the print magazine The Morgan Horse since 1941, operates a museum in Maine, and offers a variety of public information and educational services.

== History ==
The Morgan Horse Club was founded in 1909 at the 1909 Vermont State Fair, and incorporated as a membership corporation in 1927. In 1971 it was renamed the American Morgan Horse Association.

In 1988, AMHA constructed a complex in Shelburne, Vermont, called the Morgan Horse Complex, which housed the National Museum of the Morgan Horse (NMMH), the American Morgan Horse Association (AMHA), and the American Morgan Horse Institute (AMHI).

In 2020 it moved its offices to the Kentucky Horse Park in Lexington, Kentucky. It has grown to include about 7,000 active members and 90,000 living registered horses.

== Breed registry ==
The first recordings of Morgan horse pedigrees were by Joseph Battell who published The Morgan Horse and Register in 1894,. Battell's early books were incorporated into the stud books of the AMHA who maintain them today. In 2013, AMHA provided their pedigree archives to the University of Massachusetts Amherst for research purposes. By 2010, the registry had recorded more than 179,000 Morgan horses.

In 1948 the registry closed the stud book to preserve the type, and set up reciprocal agreements with the Canadian Morgan Horse Association in 1985 and the British Morgan Horse Society in 1990. Only purebred Morgan horses with two registered parents can be registered with the AMHA; half Morgans cannot be registered. Horses already registered with the British Morgan Horse Society, Swedish Morgan Horse Association, or Canadian Morgan Horse Association are eligible for AMHA registration. Cloned horses may not be registered with the AMHA, but foals resulting from embryo transfer may be.

== National Museum of the Morgan Horse ==
National Museum of the Morgan Horse is located at Pineland Farms Equestrian Center in New Gloucester, Maine. It maintains exhibits on the historical role of the Morgan horse, maintains a research library and a broad collection of artifacts. The purpose of NMMH is to maintain and preserve the history of the Morgan breed through archives and education. NMMH holds the library of the AMHA registry volumes, manuscripts, a complete collection of the breed's official publication The Morgan Horse, an extensive collection of individual Morgan horse photographs, sculptures and paintings, information about Morgan farms and breeders, and club and breed-related organizations.

== American Morgan Horse Institute ==
The American Morgan Horse Institute provides funding for educational projects, scholarships, and conducts the Grand National Morgan Horse Show annually.

== Competitions ==
Morgan horses registered with the AMHA are eligible to compete in events sanctioned by the United States Equestrian Federation, which holds all purebred Morgan shows in the United States. The AMHA also partners with the American Horse Council, the American Driving Society, the United States Dressage Federation, and the Western Dressage Association of America. There are ten sanctioned regional shows held annually, and the largest Morgan horse show, the Grand National and World Championship Morgan Horse Show, is held annually in Oklahoma City.

== See also ==
- Morgan horse
- Grand National and World Championship Morgan Horse Show
