= Morgan horse =

Breed of horse

Morgan Horse
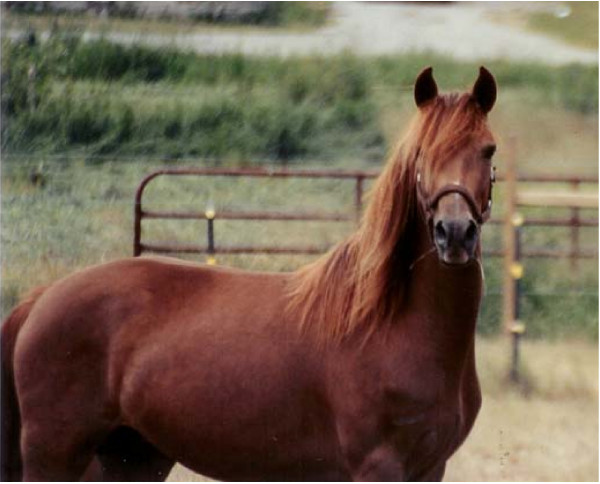

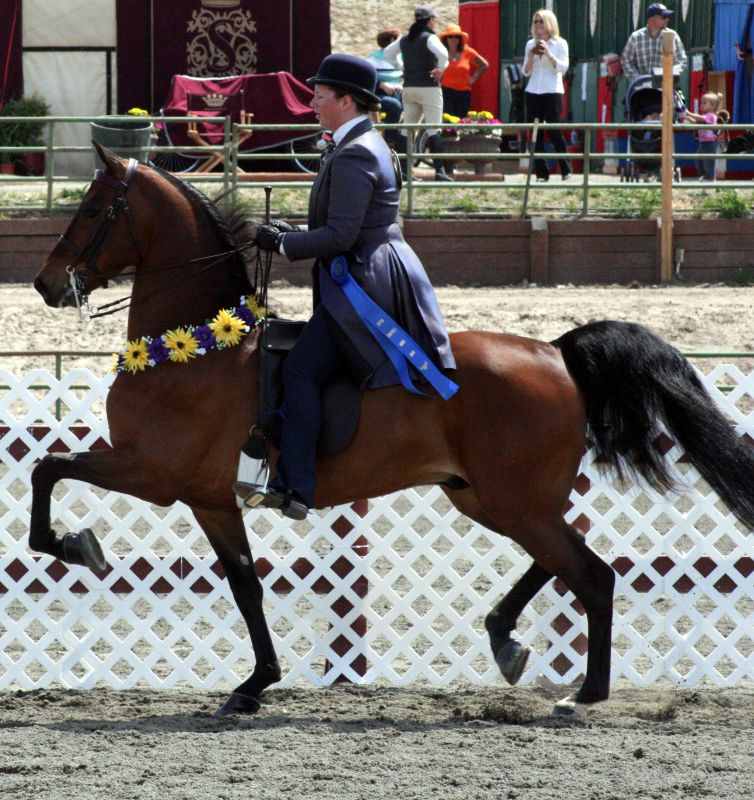
- Country of origin: United States

Traits
- Height: 14.1 to 15.2 hands (57 to 62 inches, 145 to 157 cm)
- Distinguishing features: Compact, muscular but refined build, expressive head, well arched neck.

Breed standards
- American Morgan Horse Association

The Morgan horse is one of the earliest horse breeds developed in the United States. Tracing back to the foundation sire Figure, later named Justin Morgan after his best-known owner, Morgans served many roles in 19th-century American history, being used as coach horses and for harness racing, as general riding animals, and as cavalry horses during the American Civil War on both sides of the conflict. Morgans have influenced other major American breeds, including the American Quarter Horse, Tennessee Walking Horse and the Standardbred. During the 19th and 20th centuries, they were exported to other countries, including England, where a Morgan stallion influenced the breeding of the Hackney horse. In 1907, the US Department of Agriculture established the US Morgan Horse Farm near Middlebury, Vermont for the purpose of perpetuating and improving the Morgan breed; the farm was later transferred to the University of Vermont. The first breed registry was established in 1909, and since then many organizations in the US, Canada, Europe and Oceania have developed. There were estimated to be over 175,000 Morgan horses worldwide in 2005.

The Morgan is a compact, refined breed, generally bay, black or chestnut in color, although they come in many colors, including several variations of pinto. Used in both English and Western disciplines, the breed is known for its versatility. The Morgan is the state animal of Vermont and the state horse of Massachusetts and the state mammal of Rhode Island. Popular children's authors, including Marguerite Henry and Ellen Feld, have portrayed the breed in their books; Henry's Justin Morgan Had a Horse was later made into a Disney movie.

== Breed characteristics ==
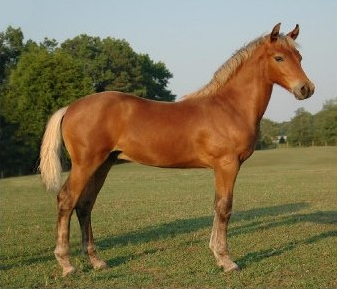
A young Morgan showing typical breed type

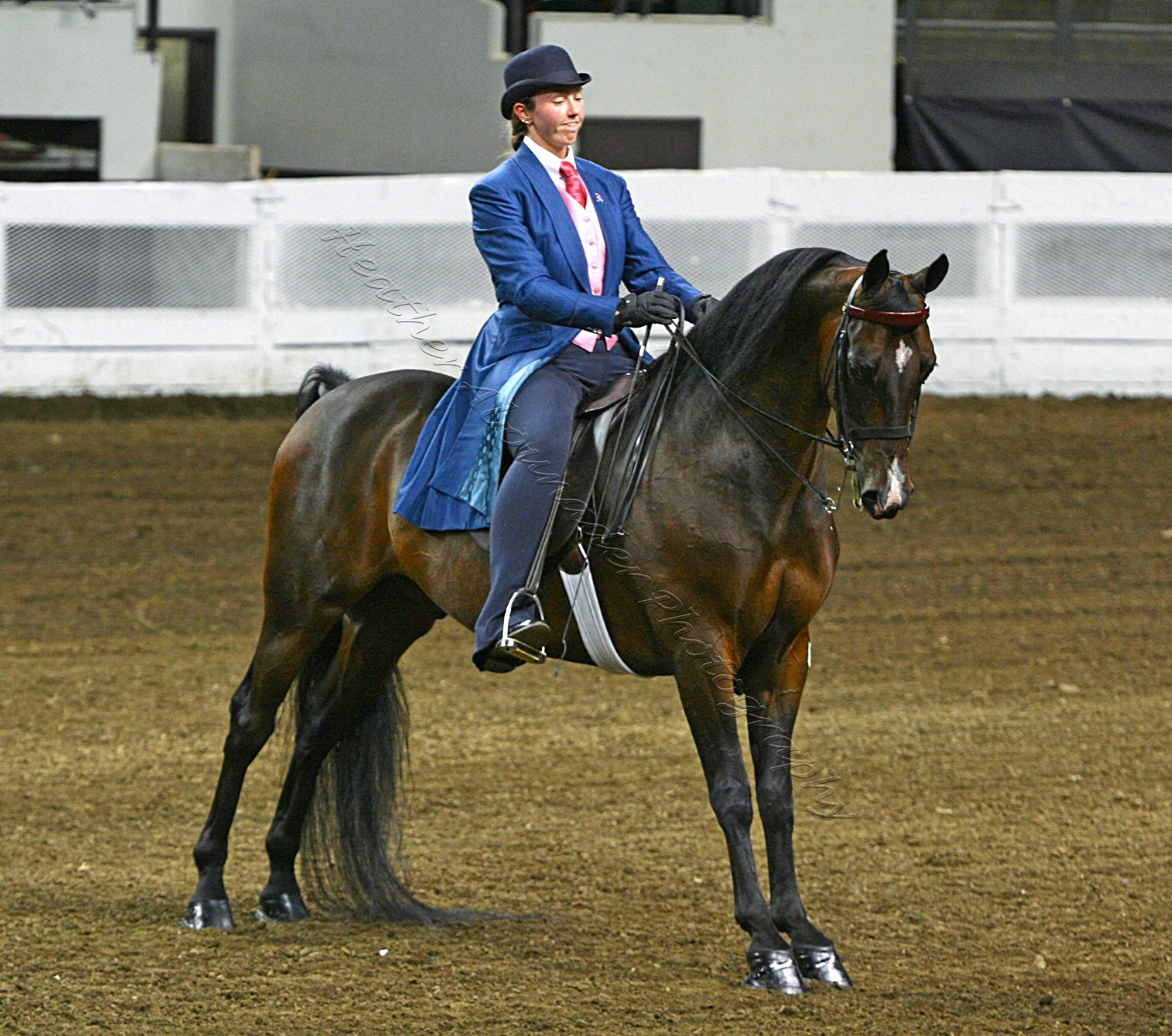
A Morgan in horse show competition

There is officially one breed standard for the Morgan type, regardless of the discipline or bloodline of the individual horse. Compact and refined in build, the Morgan has strong legs, an expressive head with a straight or slightly convex profile and broad forehead; large, prominent eyes; well-defined withers, laid back shoulders, and an upright, well arched neck. The back is short, and hindquarters are strongly muscled, with a long and well-muscled croup. The tail is attached high and carried gracefully and straight. Morgans appear to be a strong powerful horse, and the breed is well known as an easy keeper. The breed standard for height ranges from 14.1 to 15.2 hands (57 to 62 inches, 145 to 157 cm), with some individuals over and under.

Gaits, particularly the trot are "animated, elastic, square, and collected," with the front and rear legs balanced. A few Morgans are gaited, meaning they can perform an intermediate speed gait other than the trot such as the rack, fox trot, or pace. The United States Equestrian Federation states, "a Morgan is distinctive for its stamina and vigor, personality and eagerness and strong natural way of moving." The breed has a reputation for intelligence, courage and a good disposition. Registered Morgans come in a variety of colors although they are most commonly bay, black, and chestnut. Less common colors include gray, roan, dun, silver dapple, and cream dilutions such as palomino, buckskin, cremello and perlino. In addition, three pinto color patterns are also recognized: sabino, frame overo, and splashed white. The tobiano pattern has not been noted in Morgans.

One genetic disease has been identified within the Morgan breed. This is Type 1 polysaccharide storage myopathy, an autosomal dominant muscle disease found mainly in stock horse and draft horse breeds caused by a missense mutation in the GYS1 gene. Morgans are one of over a dozen breeds found to have the allele for the condition, though its prevalence in Morgans appears to be quite low compared to stock and draft breeds. In one study, less than one percent of randomly tested Morgans carried the allele for this condition, one of the lowest percentages amongst breeds in that study.

Two coat color genes found in Morgans have also been linked to genetic disorders. One is the genetic ocular syndrome multiple congenital ocular anomalies (MCOA), originally called equine anterior segment dysgenesis (ASD). MCOA is characterized by the abnormal development of some ocular tissues, which causes compromised vision, although generally of a mild form; the disease is non-progressive. Genetic studies have shown that it is closely tied to the silver dapple gene. A small number of Morgans carry the silver dapple allele, which causes cysts but no apparent vision problems if heterozygous, but when homozygous can cause vision problems. There is also the possibility of lethal white syndrome, a fatal disease seen in foals who are homozygous for the frame overo gene. At present, there is one mare line in the Morgan breed that has produced healthy heterozygous frame overo individuals. The American Morgan Horse Association advocates genetic testing to identify carriers of these genetics, and advises owners to avoid breeding horses that are heterozygous for frame overo to each other.

== Breed history ==
=== Justin Morgan ===
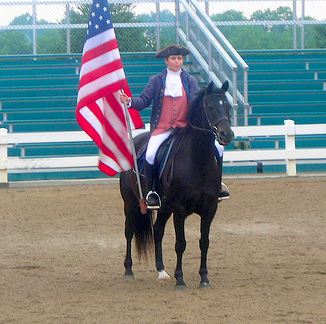
A Morgan horse with rider in colonial attire to resemble Justin Morgan and Figure

All Morgans trace back to a single foundation sire, a stallion named Figure, who was born in West Springfield, Massachusetts in 1789. In 1792, he was given to a man named Justin Morgan as a debt payment. The horse later came to be identified by the name of this particular owner, and "the Justin Morgan horse" evolved into the name of the breed. Figure is thought to have stood about 14 hands (56 inches, 142 cm), and to have weighed about 1,000 pounds (450 kg). He was known for his prepotency, passing on his distinctive looks, conformation, temperament, and athleticism. His exact pedigree is unknown, although extensive efforts have been made to discover his parentage. One historian notes that the writings on the possibility of his sire being a Thoroughbred named Beautiful Bay would "fill 41 detective novels and a membership application for the Liars' Club." In 1821, Figure was kicked by another horse and later died of his injuries. He was buried in Tunbridge, Vermont.

Although Figure was used extensively as a breeding stallion, records are known to exist for only six of his sons, three of whom became notable as foundation bloodstock for the Morgan breed. Woodbury, a chestnut, stood 14.3 hands (59 inches, 150 cm) high and stood for many years at stud in New England. Bulrush, a dark bay the same size as Figure, was known for his endurance and speed in harness. Best known was Sherman, another chestnut stallion, slightly shorter than Figure, who in turn was the sire and grandsire of Black Hawk and Ethan Allen. Black Hawk, born in 1833, went on to become a foundation stallion for the Standardbred, American Saddlebred and Tennessee Walking Horse breeds, and was known for his unbeaten harness racing record. Ethan Allen, sired by Black Hawk in 1849, is another important sire in the history of the Morgan breed, and was known for his speed in trotting races.

=== Breed development ===
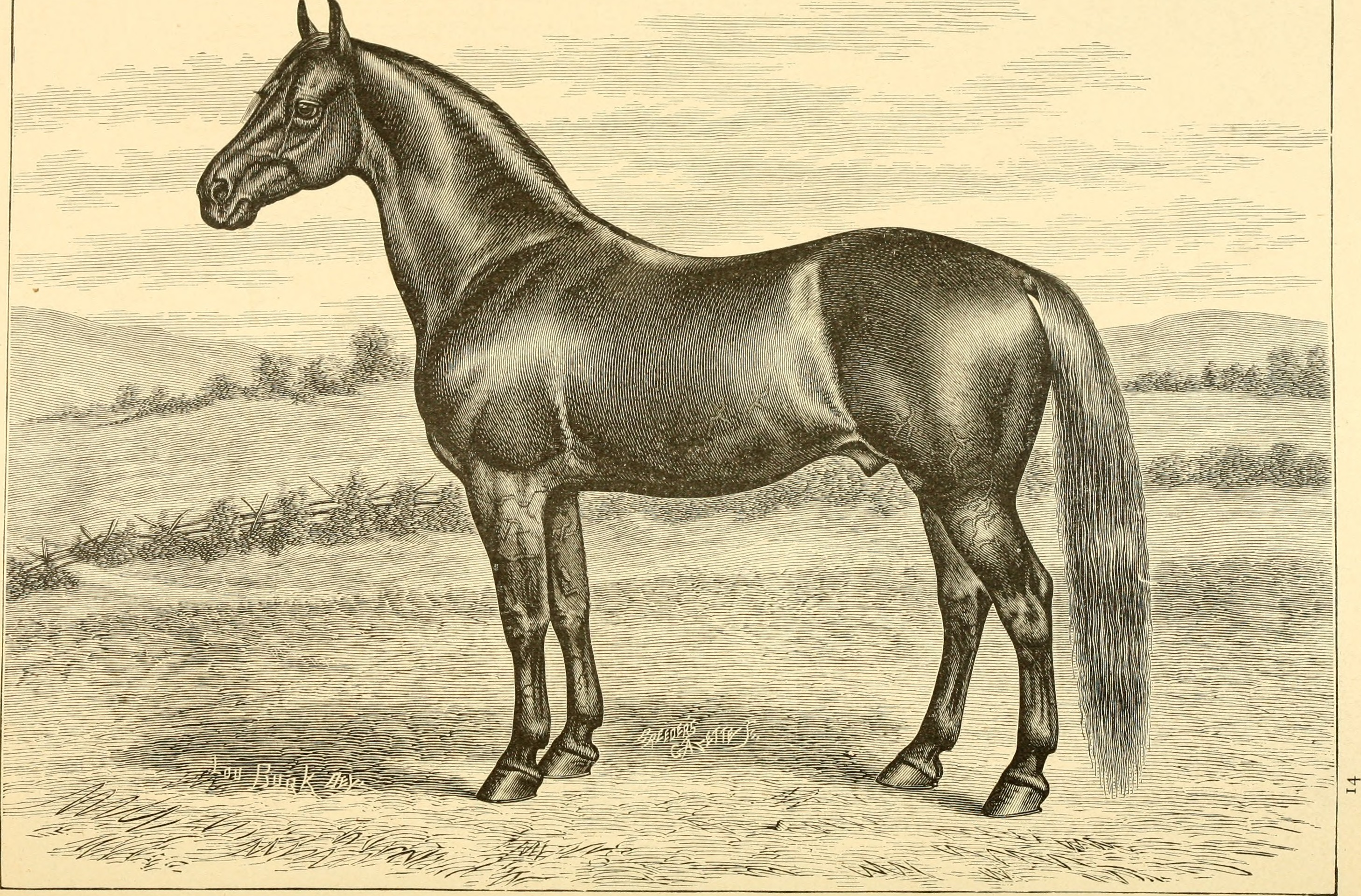
Morgan horse, 1887

In the 19th century, Morgans were recognized for their utilitarian capabilities. They were used extensively for harness racing, as well as for pulling coaches, due to the breed's speed and endurance in harness. They were also used as stock horses and for general riding, as well as light driving work. Miners in the California Gold Rush (1848–1855) used the breed, as did the Army during and after the American Civil War for both riding and harness horses.

The Morgan trotting stallion Shepherd F. Knapp was exported to England in the 1860s, where his trotting ability influenced the breeding of Hackney horses. During this period, numerous Morgan mares may have been brought west and integrated into Texan horse herds, which influenced the development of the American Quarter Horse breed. The Morgan horse also was an ancestor of the Missouri Fox Trotter. By the 1870s, however, longer-legged horses came into fashion, and Morgan horses were crossed with those of other breeds. This resulted in the virtual disappearance of the original style Morgan, although a few remained in isolated areas.

Daniel Chipman Linsley, a native of Middlebury, Vermont, compiled a book of Morgan breeding stallions, published in 1857. Colonel Joseph Battell, also a Middlebury, Vermont native, published the first volume of the Morgan Horse Register in 1894, marking the beginning of a formal breed registry. In 1907, the US Department of Agriculture established the US Morgan Horse Farm in Weybridge, Vermont on land donated by Battell for the purpose of perpetuating and improving the Morgan breed. The breeding program aimed to produce horses that were sound, sturdy, well-mannered, and capable of performing well either under saddle or in harness. In 1951, the Morgan Horse Farm was transferred from the USDA to the Vermont Agricultural College (now the University of Vermont).

=== Military use ===
Morgans were used as cavalry mounts by both sides in the American Civil War. Horses with Morgan roots included Sheridan's Winchester, also known as Rienzi, (a descendant of Black Hawk). Stonewall Jackson's horse Little Sorrel has alternately been described as a Morgan, an American Saddlebred, a breed heavily influenced by the Morgan, or a Narragansett Pacer. While Morgan enthusiasts have stated that the horse Comanche, the only survivor of the Custer regiment after the Battle of the Little Big Horn, was either a Morgan or a Mustang/Morgan mix, records of the U.S. Army and other early sources do not support this. Most accounts state that Comanche was either of "Mustang lineage" or a mix of "American" and "Spanish" blood. The University of Kansas Natural History Museum, which has the stuffed body of Comanche on display, makes no statement as to his breed. All sources agree that Comanche originated in the Oklahoma or Texas area, making his Mustang background more likely.

=== Bloodlines ===
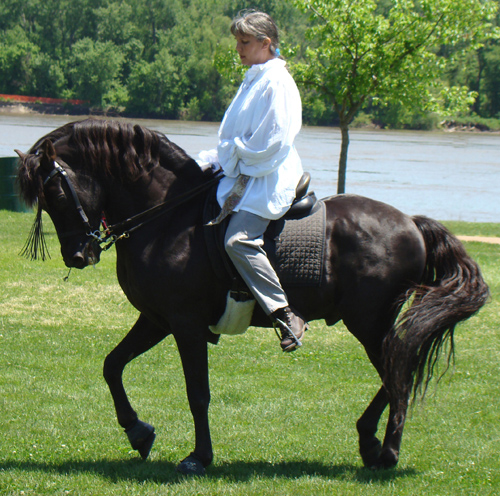
A Lippitt Morgan stallion

There are four main bloodlines groups within the Morgan breed today, known as the Brunk, Government, Lippitt, and Western Working "families." There are also smaller subfamilies. The Brunk Family, particularly noted for soundness and athleticism, traces to the Illinois breeding program of Joseph Brunk. The Lippitt Family or "Lippitts" trace to the breeding program of Robert Lippitt Knight, grandson of industrialist Robert Knight and maternal great-great grandson of Revolutionary War officer Christopher Lippitt, founder of the Lippitt Mill. Robert Lippitt Knight focused on preservation breeding of horses descended from Ethan Allen II and this line is considered the "purest" of the four lines, with the most lines tracing back to Figure and no outcrosses to other breeds in the 20th or 21st centuries. The Government Family is the largest, tracing to Morgans bred by the US Morgan Horse Farm between 1905 and 1951. The foundation sire of this line was General Gates. When USDA involvement ended, the University of Vermont purchased not only the farm, but much of its breeding stock and carries on the program today. The Working Western Family, abbreviated 2WF, have no common breeder or ancestor, but the horses are bred to be stock horses and work cattle, some descended from Government farm stallions shipped west.

=== Organizations ===
In 1909, the Morgan Horse Club was founded, later changing its name to the American Morgan Horse Association. During the 1930s and 1940s, there was controversy within the registry membership as to whether the stud book should be open or closed; this mirrored similar controversies in other US breed registries. The result of these discussions was that the stud book was declared closed to outside blood as of January 1, 1948. In 1985, the US and Canadian registries signed a reciprocity agreement regarding the registration of horses, and a similar agreement was made between the US and Great Britain registries in 1990. As of 2012, approximately 179,000 horses had been registered over the life of the association, with over 3,000 new foals registered annually. It is estimated that between 175,000 and 180,000 Morgans exist worldwide, and although they are most popular in the United States, there are populations in Great Britain, Sweden and other countries.

The American Morgan Horse Association (AMHA) is the largest association for the breed. In addition to the AMHA, since 1996, there has also been a National Morgan Pony Registry, which specializes in horses under 14.2 hands (58 inches, 147 cm). There are several other organizations that focus on specific bloodlines within the Morgan breed. These include the Rainbow Morgan Horse Association, begun in 1990, which works with the AMHA to develop and promote unusually-colored Morgans, such as those with the silver dapple and cream genes. The Foundation Morgan Horse Association registers those horses bred to resemble the stockier type seen in the late 1800s and early 1900s, before crossbreeding with the American Saddlebred became common. Two other membership based organizations, both devoted to preserving the old-time Vermont or "Lippitt" strain of Morgans, also exist. The first, the Lippitt Club, was started in 1973, and the second, the Lippitt Morgan Breeders Association, was founded in 1995. The Lippitt Morgan Horse Registry, Inc., was formed in 2011. It registers and maintains a dna data base with pedigrees of Lippitt Morgans. There are also associations for Morgans in several countries besides the US, including Canada, Australia, New Zealand, Great Britain, Sweden, Austria and Germany. In Middlebury, Vermont there is a museum dedicated to the history of the breed.

== Uses ==
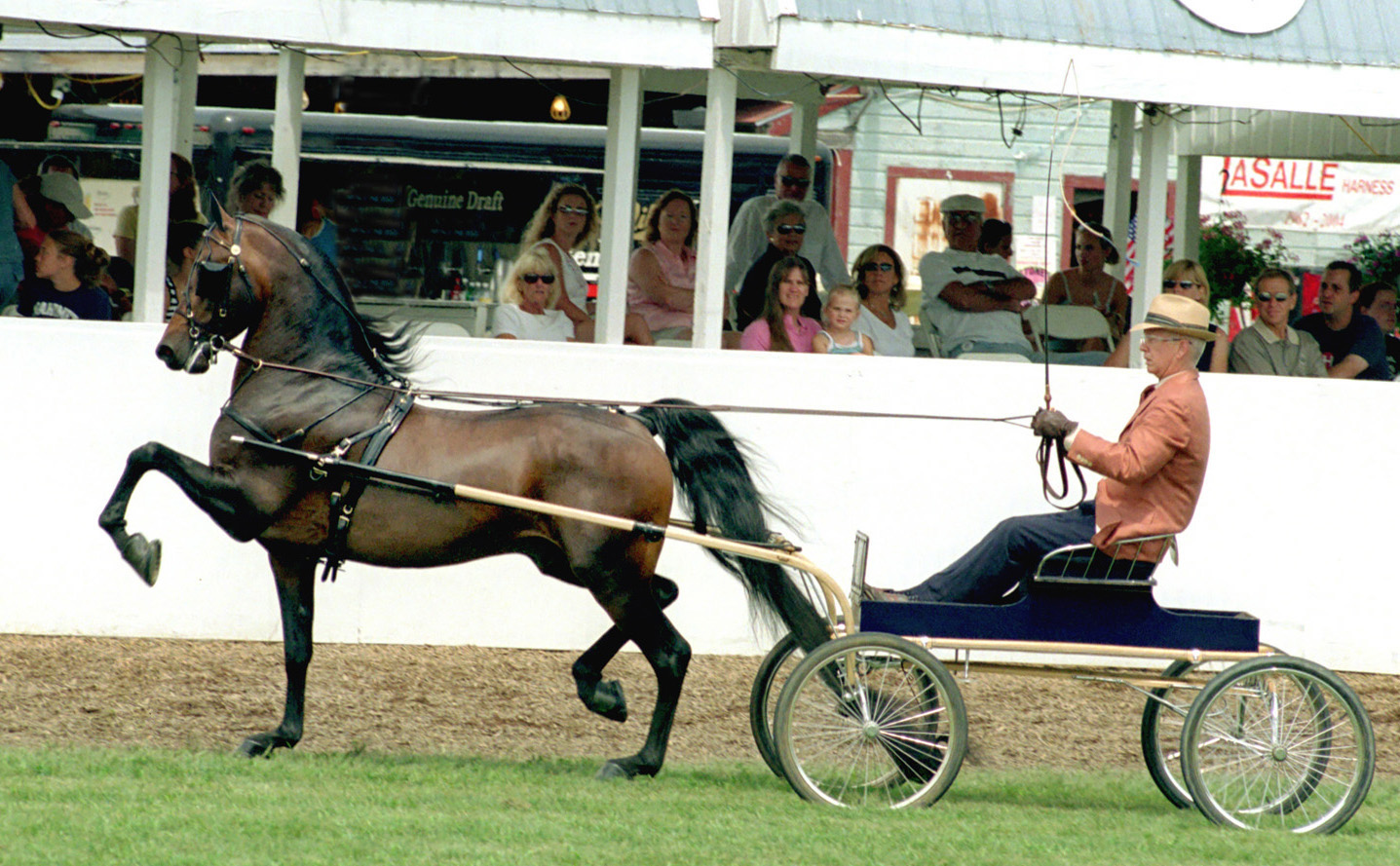
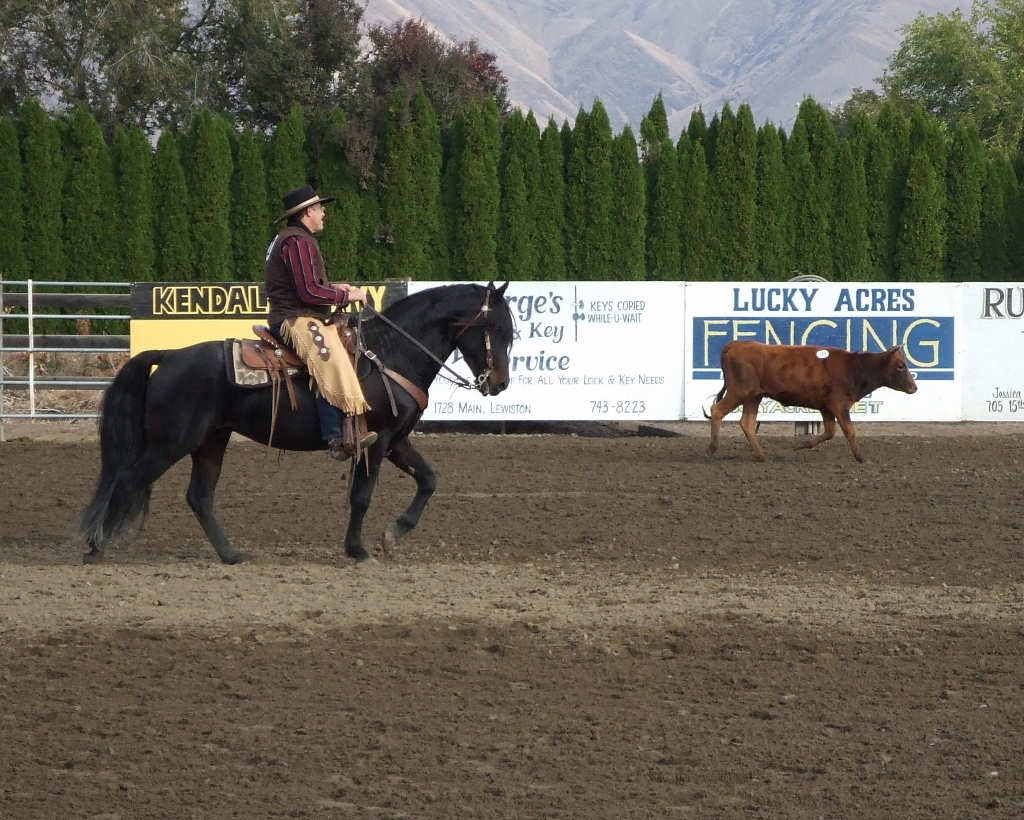
Morgan horse driving in fine harness, and one being ridden Western

The Morgan breed is known for its versatility, and is used for a number of English and Western events. They have been successfully shown in many disciplines, including dressage, show jumping, Western pleasure, cutting and endurance riding. They are also used as stock horses and for pleasure riding and driving. They are frequently seen in driving competitions, including combined driving and carriage driving. Morgans were the first American breed to compete in the World Pairs Driving competition, representing the US. They can be seen as mounts for 4-H and Pony Club participants and therapeutic riding programs, due to their gentle disposition and steady movement.

There are Morgan-only shows held throughout the US, as well as an "open competition" program run by the AMHA that gives points based on competition success at all-breed shows. The first annual Grand National and World Championship Morgan Horse Show was held in 1973 in Detroit, Michigan and in 1975 moved to its current home in Oklahoma City, Oklahoma. Over 1,000 horses compete in the show each year. In 1961, the Morgan horse was named the official state animal of Vermont, and in 1970, the official state horse of Massachusetts.

== In literature and film ==
The children's book, Justin Morgan Had a Horse by Marguerite Henry, published in 1945, was a fictional account of Figure and Justin Morgan. It was a Newbery Honor Book in 1946. A movie based on the book was made by Walt Disney Studios in 1972. Both the book and the movie have been criticized for containing a number of historical inaccuracies and for creating or perpetuating some myths about both Justin Morgan and Figure. One equine historian stated, "these should be looked upon not as true happenings but as entertainment vehicles."

Ellen Feld, a children's author, is also known for her "Morgan Horse" series. Blackjack: Dreaming of a Morgan Horse, won a Children's Choice Award in 2005, following the 2004 award for its sequel, Frosty: The Adventures of a Morgan Horse. These awards were given by the International Reading Association and the Children’s Book Council.

A Morgan horse is the subject of the poem, The Runaway by Robert Frost. In the poem, the speaker observes "A little Morgan" colt who has been left out in a mountain pasture during winter and seems to be afraid of the falling snow.
