= Figure (horse) =

Small bay stallion owned by Justin Morgan

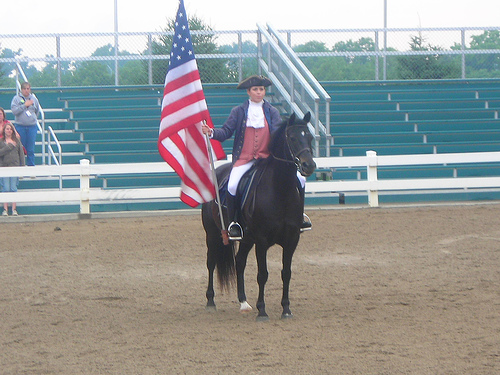
Horse and rider costumed to resemble Figure and Justin Morgan.

Figure was a small bay stallion owned by Justin Morgan; he became the foundation sire of the Morgan horse breed.

== Early years ==
The stallion was born in West Springfield, Massachusetts in 1789. The small, dark colt is believed to have been sired by an English Thoroughbred stallion named "True Briton." Figure's dam was of "Wild-Air" breeding (part thoroughbred, part Arabian), sired by Diamond, foaled in 1784 in West Springfield. Figure is thought to have stood about 14 hands high (1.42 m), and to have weighed about 950 lb (430 kg). Figure was a hard worker and fast racer.

== Controversy ==
N.Y. Wallace, a respected trotting expert and 1968 Harness Racing Hall of Fame inductee, claimed that Figure's sire was not the English thoroughbred True Briton. Wallace asserted that there was a different horse named Figure foaled in Hartford, Connecticut that was not this horse. Wallace concluded that Morgan was engaging in fraud by misrepresenting the horse's lineage. Morgan and his proponents denied the claims, pointing to the horse's performance as evidence of its legitimacy.

== Ownership by Justin Morgan ==
In 1792, Figure was advertised for stud before he was given as payment for a debt to Justin Morgan (1747–1798), a singing teacher and one-time Randolph, Vermont, Town Clerk. Morgan owned Figure from 1792 to 1795, advertising him for stud in Randolph and Lebanon, New Hampshire (1793), and Royalton, Vermont (1794), and Williston and Hinesburg, Vermont (1795). He leased Figure to Robert Evans in the fall of 1795 to clear land for a Mr. Fisk at a rate of $15.00 a year.

Morgan later traded the horse to Samuel Allen for land in Moretown, Vermont. Allen sold the stallion later that year to William Rice of Woodstock, Vermont.

== Accomplishments ==
In 1796, Figure raced in a sweepstakes in Brookfield, Vermont, beating New York horses to win $50. That year, he was advertised at stud by Johnathan Shepard of Montpelier, who also raced him in several match races in which he did well. Figure became known as the "Justin Morgan horse."

== Other owners ==
Figure was traded again in 1797, along with a blacksmith shop, to James Hawkins. In 1801 he was recorded as owned by Robert Evans of Randolph. Evans owned the horse until 1804, using the stallion for logging, racing, and breeding, until he fell into debt to Colonel John Goss. Goss collected the horse as part of the debt, and used him to review troops. He entered the horse in a pulling bee, which the little horse won. In 1805, Goss traded Figure for a mare owned by his brother David.

David Goss owned Figure from 1805 to 1811, where he worked on the farm for 10 months, and was used for breeding for two months each year. He was sold in 1811 to Philip Goss for the breeding season. Philip Goss sold Figure to Jacob Sanderson, who sold him to Jacob Langmeade. Langmeade used the horse to haul freight, and is thought to have abused the aging stallion.

Langmeade sold Figure to Joel Goss and Joseph Rogers at the end of 1811. Figure stood at stud for several years, before he was sold to Samuel Stone in 1817. Stone exhibited the stallion in the Randolph fair. Figure was used as a parade mount by President James Monroe later that year.

== Final years ==
In 1819, Figure was sold to his final owner, Levi Bean of Chelsea, Vermont. Toward the end of his life, Figure was put out to pasture. He died in 1821 from an injury to the flank, caused by a kick, at the age of 32. Figure is now buried in Chelsea, Vermont.

== Stories, myths and legends ==
Many myths developed surrounding Figure and Justin Morgan. The popular 1945 children's book, Justin Morgan Had a Horse by Marguerite Henry, is a fictionalized account of Figure (called "Little Bub" in the book) and his early life. Walt Disney Studios adapted the book into a film in 1972.

== Sire line tree ==
- Figure (Justin Morgan)
  - Gascon la Rocque
    - Carillon
      - Old Pacing Pilot
        - Pilot Junior
  - Hawkin's Horse
    - Papineau
      - Young Papineau
        - Farmer's Beauty
    - De Mars Horse
      - Francis Lareau Horse
        - St Lawrence
  - Sherman Morgan
    - Royal Morgan
      - Scott Horse
    - Cock of the Rock
      - Barden Morgan
        - Young Morgan
      - American Star (Coburn)
        - American Star (Seeley)
      - Morgan Deforrest
        - General Gifford
      - Black Prince
    - Flint Morgan
      - Napoleon Morgan
        - Granite State Morgan
    - Vermont Morgan Champion
      - Shedd Horse
        - Vincent Horse
          - Mountaineer Morgan
            - Knox Morgan
              - Senator Knox
                - Senator Graham
                  - Starfire
                    - Waseekas Nocturne
                      - Waseekas In Command
                        - Noble Command
                          - Noble Flaire
    - Green Mountain (Bachup)
      - Black Morgan
        - Black Morgan 2nd
        - Morgan Tiger
    - Whalebone
    - Billy Root
      - Greely Horse
        - Mountaineer
      - Morgan General
      - Vermont Boy
        - Reconstruction
      - Comet (Wood)
        - Fox Morgan
      - Morgan Comet
    - Black Hawk
      - Black Ralph
      - Kossuth
      - Selim
      - Sherman Black Hawk
        - Vermont Hero
        - King Herod
      - Ticonderoga
        - Black Prince
      - Vermont Black Hawk (Blood)
        - Black Hawk (Gist)
        - Indian Chief
        - Blood Chief
      - Black Hawk (Hill)
        - Ti Boy
      - Paul Clifford
      - Rounds Horse
        - Darkey
      - Black Hawk (Chris Doyle)
        - Grey Eagle
      - Flying Cloud
        - Star of the West
      - Stockbridge Chief
        - Mambrino Black Hawk
      - Ethan Allen
        - Honest Allen
        - Daniel Lambert
        - Ethan Allen (Holabird)
        - Superb
        - Ethan Allen (Woodward)
      - Gray Eagle (b.1849)
      - Lancet
      - Telegraph (Bradford)
      - Bay State
      - Black Hawk (Smith)
      - Trotting Childers
      - Wild-air
      - Chieftain
        - Young Rix
      - Vermont (Downing)
      - Gray Eagle (b.1852)
        - Grey Eagle
      - Black Hawk Telegraph
        - Strideaway
      - Pathfinder (Benedict)
        - Pathfinder (Buell)
      - Illinois Black Hawk
        - Morgan Eclipse
  - Weasel
  - Copperbottom
    - Tom Hal (b.1812)
      - Carrilion
        - Old Pilot
    - Brutus
      - Copperbottom (Johnson)
        - Copperbottom (Curdy)
  - European
    - Morse Horse
      - Norman
        - Blackwood
  - Bulrush Morgan
    - Randolph Morgan
      - Jennison Colt
        - Morrill
    - Morgan Emperor
      - North Star
    - Andrew Jackson
      - Andrew Jackson Jr
  - Blazing Star
  - Fox (Corbin)
  - Tom Hal (b.1816)
    - Bald Stockings
      - Tom Hal (Kitttrel)
        - Tom Hal (Gibson)
  - Woodbury Morgan
    - Gifford Morgan
      - Hacket Horse
        - Flying Morgan
        - Black Jack
      - Green Mountain Morgan (Hale)
        - Prince Albert
        - Wood Horse
        - Romeo
        - Dan Rice
        - Eureka (Ross Butler)
        - Clifton
        - Sir William (Turner)
        - Rutland Morgan
      - Barnard Morgan
        - Vermont Morgan
      - Morgan Hunter
      - Gifford Morgan Jr
      - General Gifford
    - Morgan Caesar
      - Mac
    - Putnam Morgan
      - Chittenden County Morgan
        - Comet
      - Wildair
        - Billy King

== Pedigree ==
Pedigree of Figure, bay stallion, 1789
Sire True Briton 1780	Traveller (Lloyd); 1761	Traveller (Morton); 1746	Partner (Old)
Sire True Briton 1780	Traveller (Lloyd); 1761	Traveller (Morton); 1746	Bay Bloody Buttocks
Sire True Briton 1780	Traveller (Lloyd); 1761	Jenny Cameron; 1742	Quiet Cuddy
Sire True Briton 1780	Traveller (Lloyd); 1761	Jenny Cameron; 1742	Sultan mare
Sire True Briton 1780	Betty Leeds; 1760	Babraham; 1738	Godolphin Arabian
Sire True Briton 1780	Betty Leeds; 1760	Babraham; 1738	Sachrissa
Sire True Briton 1780	Betty Leeds; 1760	Bolton Starling mare 1750	Bolton Starling
Sire True Briton 1780	Betty Leeds; 1760	Bolton Starling mare 1750	Bonny Bay
Dam Diamond mare 1784	Diamond; 1779	Wildair (Church); 1774	Wildair
Dam Diamond mare 1784	Diamond; 1779	Wildair (Church); 1774	Wildair mare (Burt)
Dam Diamond mare 1784	Diamond; 1779	(unknown)	(unknown)
Dam Diamond mare 1784	Diamond; 1779	(unknown)	(unknown)
Dam Diamond mare 1784	Sportsman mare 1779	Sportsman; 1774	Arabian Ranger
Dam Diamond mare 1784	Sportsman mare 1779	Sportsman; 1774	(unknown)
Dam Diamond mare 1784	Sportsman mare 1779	(unknown)	(unknown)
Dam Diamond mare 1784	Sportsman mare 1779	(unknown)	(unknown)

== See also ==
- List of historical horses
