= Grand National and World Championship Morgan Horse Show =

- Location: Oklahoma City, Oklahoma
- Held: Annually
- Length: One week
- Inaugurated: 1973
- Breeds shown: Morgan horses
- Largest honor: Open World Championships and AMHA Medal Finals
- Total purse: $300,000
- Number of entries: Over 1,000
- Slogan: A Tradition of Excellence
- Website: www.morgangrandnational.com

The Grand National and World Championship Morgan Horse Show is the largest annual competition for the Morgan horse. The "Grand National" was first held in 1974 in Detroit, Michigan and was held there again the following year, before it permanently moved to State Fair Park in Oklahoma City in 1975. The Morgan Grand National averages attendance of about 5,000, and over 1,000 horses compete over the course of the week-long show, which is held in early to mid October. The show offers classes in disciplines such as western, hunt seat, saddle seat, dressage, and reining. The show offers $300,000 in prize money. It includes a wide variety of classes, including saddle seat, western pleasure, harness, and show jumping.
