= Marguerite Henry =

American novelist

- Born: Marguerite Breithaupt; April 13, 1902; Milwaukee, Wisconsin, US
- Died: November 26, 1997 (aged 95); Rancho Santa Fe, California
- Occupation: Writer
- Spouse: Sidney Crocker Henry
- Writing career
- Pen name: Marguerite Henry
- Period: 1940–1997
- Genres: Children's books, animal stories, historical novels, pony books
- Subject: Geography picture books
- Notable works: Misty of Chincoteague; King of the Wind; Brighty of the Grand Canyon
- Notable awards: Newbery Medal; 1949

Marguerite Henry (née Breithaupt; April 13, 1902 – November 26, 1997) was an American writer of children's books, writing fifty-nine books based on true stories of horses and other animals. She won the Newbery Medal for King of the Wind, a 1948 book about horses, and she was a runner-up for two others. One of the latter, Misty of Chincoteague (1947), was the basis for several related titles and the 1961 movie Misty.

== Biography ==
Born to Louis and Anna Breithaupt, the youngest of five children, Henry was a native of Milwaukee, Wisconsin. Henry's love of animals started during her childhood. Soon afterwards, she also discovered a love for writing when her parents presented her with a writing desk for Christmas. Henry later said, "At last I had a world of my very own – a writing world, and soon it would be populated by all the creatures of my imagination." Henry was stricken with rheumatic fever at the age of six, which kept her bedridden until the age of twelve. She was unable to attend school with other children due to her weak condition and the fear of spreading the illness to other people. While confined indoors, she turned to reading and writing to keep herself entertained.

Henry sold her first story at the age of 11. The Delineator (a popular women's magazine) had solicited articles about the four seasons from children, and she was paid $12 (now about $250) for "Hide-and-Seek in Autumn Leaves". She often wrote about animals, such as dogs, cats, birds, foxes, and mules, but chiefly her stories focused on horses.

She studied at Milwaukee State Teachers College. After graduation she traveled to Wisconsin's North Woods with her family and met a traveling salesman from Sheboygan, Sidney Crocker Henry. On May 5, 1923, Henry married Sidney Henry in Milwaukee. The couple moved to the north side of Chicago where Henry launched her writing career by writing for magazines. During their 64 years of marriage they did not have any children, but instead had numerous pets that served as the inspiration for some of Henry's stories. They lived in Wayne, Illinois.

In 1945, Henry began a 20-year collaboration with artist Wesley Dennis. "I had just finished writing Justin Morgan Had a Horse," she recalled, "and wanted the best horse artist in the world to illustrate it. So I went to the library, studied the horse books, and immediately fell in love with the work of Will James and Wesley Dennis. When I found out that Will James was dead, I sent my manuscript to Wesley Dennis." Henry and Dennis eventually collaborated on nearly 20 books.

Misty of Chincoteague was published in 1947 and was an instant success. In 1961, it was adapted for film, as were Justin Morgan had a Horse (1972) and Brighty of the Grand Canyon (1967). (Note: Brighty of the Grand Canyon (1953) may have originated with Dennis. The National Sporting Library hosted an exhibition of work by Wesley Dennis late in 2001. According to a contemporary biographical sketch by one NSL librarian, Dennis was in New Mexico c. 1940 "to gather material for a book idea he called Brighty of the Grand Canyon". By chance he met the children's book editor May Massee there, which proved to be a crucial breakthrough in his career.) San Domingo, the Medicine Hat Stallion was adapted for television as Peter Lundy and the Medicine Hat Stallion in 1977.

Henry's last book was Brown Sunshine of Sawdust Valley, a 93-page novel published in September 1996, when she was 94 years old. Kirkus Reviews called it "Vintage Henry ...a lighthearted version of the old girl-meets-horse story; only this time, the horse is a mule."

She died on November 26, 1997, at home in Rancho Santa Fe, California, after multiple strokes.

== Legacy ==
Misty features the annual Pony Penning of feral horses from Assateague Island, a two-day round-up, swim, and auction that Henry had been "sent to look at" by her hopeful editor, Mary Alice Jones. She created several Misty-related titles including two more children's novels illustrated by Dennis, Sea Star, Orphan of Chincoteague (1949) and Stormy, Misty's Foal (1963). The beneficiaries of "Marguerite Henry's Legacy", as a Washington Post editorial termed local tourism, were the Assateague nature preserve and Chincoteague town. Within her lifetime Pony Penning itself drew about 25,000 visitors and their number was 40 to 50,000 according to a local estimate ten years later. In 2023 the Museum of Chincoteague raised donations to purchase the Beebe Ranch—the location where Misty was born in 1946.

Henry's papers are held in the Marguerite Henry Collection of the Elmer Andersen Library at the University of Minnesota. This extensive collection contains production material for titles published between 1942 and 1996 as well as material from unpublished works, correspondence, research notes, and awards.

== Awards ==
Henry won the annual Newbery Medal from the American Library Association in 1949, recognizing King of the Wind: the story of the Godolphin Arabian as the year's "most distinguished contribution to American literature for children". She had been a runner-up for Justin Morgan Had a Horse in 1946 and Misty of Chincoteague in 1948. Brighty of the Grand Canyon was given the William Allen White Children's Book Award in 1956. In 1960, Black Gold won the Sequoyah Book Award. Gaudenzia: Pride of the Palio was awarded the Clara Ingram Judson Award for children's literature in 1961. Misty of Chincoteague was named to the Lewis Carroll Shelf Award list in 1961. Mustang, Wild Spirit of the West received the 1967 Western Heritage Award for Outstanding Juvenile Book and the 1970 Sequoyah Book Award.

== Works ==
Auno and Tauno by Marguerite Henry

- Auno and Tauno: a Story of Finland, illus. Gladys Rourke Blackwood (1940)
- Dilly Dally Sally, illus. Gladys Rourke Blackwood (1940)
- Birds at Home, illus. Jacob Bates Abbott (1942)
- Geraldine Belinda, illus. Gladys Rourke Blackwood (1942)
- Their First Igloo On Baffin Island, illus. Gladys Rourke Blackwood (1943)
- A Boy and a Dog, illus. Diana Thorne and Ottilie Foy (1944)
- Justin Morgan Had a Horse, illus. Wesley Dennis (1945)
- The Little Fellow, illus. Diana Thorne (1945)
- Robert Fulton, Boy Craftsman, illus. Lawrence Dresser (1945)
- Always Reddy, illus. Wesley Dennis (1947); also published as Shamrock Queen
- Benjamin West and His Cat Grimalkin, by Henry and Wesley Dennis (1947) – about the artist Benjamin West, OCLC 300163
- Misty of Chincoteague, illus. Wesley Dennis (1947)
- King of the Wind: the Story of the Godolphin Arabian, illus. Wesley Dennis (1948)
- Little-or-Nothing from Nottingham, illus. Wesley Dennis (1949)
- Sea Star, Orphan of Chincoteague, illus. Wesley Dennis (1949)
- Born To Trot, illus. Wesley Dennis (1950) – about the Standardbred line and specifically the mare Rosalind
- Album of Horses, illus. Wesley Dennis (1951)
- Brighty of the Grand Canyon, illus. Wesley Dennis (1953)
- Justin Morgan Had a Horse (revised), illus. Wesley Dennis (1954)
- Wagging Tails: Album of Dogs, illus. Wesley Dennis (1955)
- Cinnabar, the One O'Clock Fox, illus. Wesley Dennis (1956)
- Misty, the Wonder Pony, by Misty, Herself, illus. Clare McKinley (1956) – picture book
- Black Gold, illus. Wesley Dennis (1957) – about the horse Black Gold
- Muley-Ears, Nobody's Dog, illus. Wesley Dennis (1959)
- Gaudenzia, Pride of the Palio, illus. Lynd Ward (1960); also published as The Wildest Horse Race in the World – featuring the Palio di Siena horserace
- All About Horses, illus. drawings by Wesley Dennis and photos (1962)
- Five O'Clock Charlie, illus. Wesley Dennis (1962)
- Stormy, Misty's Foal, illus. Wesley Dennis (1963)
- Portfolio of Horse Paintings, illus. Wesley Dennis, "with commentary by Marguerite Henry" (1964), LCCN 64-22279
- White Stallion of Lipizza, illus. Wesley Dennis (1964) – about the Vienna Spanish Riding School
- Mustang, Wild Spirit of the West, illus. Robert Lougheed (1966) – about Wild Horse Annie and American mustang conservation
- Dear Readers and Riders (1969); also published as Dear Marguerite Henry
- San Domingo, the Medicine Hat Stallion, illus. Robert Lougheed (1972); also published as Peter Lundy and the Medicine Hat Stallion (1977) and adapted for television under that title by Ed Friendly (1978) – set in Pony Express-era Wyoming, LCCN 77-83915
- Stories from Around the World, edited and with an introduction by Marguerite Henry (1974)
- The Little Fellow (revised), illus. Rich Rudish (1975)
- A Pictorial Life Story of Misty, drawings by Wesley Dennis (1976)
- One Man's Horse, illus. Wesley Dennis, "with famous paintings and prints by selected artists" (1977) – selections from Born to Trot (1950), LCCN 77-10080
- The Illustrated Marguerite Henry, illus. Wesley Dennis, Robert Lougheed, Lynd Ward, Rich Rudish (1980) – biographical material about these four of her illustrators, with selections from their work, LCCN 80-52017
- Our First Pony, illus. Rich Rudish (1984)
- Misty's Twilight, illus. Karen Haus Grandpre (1992)
- Album of Horses: a pop-up book, illus. Ezra N. Tucker (1993)
- Brown Sunshine of Sawdust Valley, illus. Bonnie Shields (1996)
- My Misty Diary, illus. Bill Farnsworth (1997)

=== Pictured Geography ===
Albert Whitman and Company of Chicago published the Pictured Geography series in the 1940s. Four sets of eight 28-page children's picture books about world nations and other territories were illustrated by Kurt Wiese. Henry wrote the texts for the first and fourth sets. At least one library catalog record indicates a "preschool" audience. Kirkus Reviews observed in a brief contemporary positive review of the fourth series, "Third and fourth graders will find this a pleasant way to expand the confines of school geographies."

First Series, 1941

- Alaska in Story and Pictures
- Argentina in Story and Pictures
- Brazil in Story and Pictures
- Canada in Story and Pictures
- Chile in Story and Pictures
- Mexico in Story and Pictures
- Panama in Story and Pictures
- West Indies in Story and Pictures

Fourth Series, 1946

- Australia in Story and Pictures
- Bahamas in Story and Pictures
- Bermuda in Story and Pictures
- British Honduras in Story and Pictures
- Dominican Republic in Story and Pictures
- Hawaii in Story and Pictures
- New Zealand in Story and Pictures
- Virgin Islands in Story and Pictures

Bernadine Bailey wrote the second, 1942 series; Lois Donaldson the third, 1944 series. The Virgin Islands volume was reviewed briefly in the "New Biological Books" section of The Quarterly Review of Biology: "A brief account of the historical, economic, and geographical features of the Virgin Islands. The illustrations are not particularly attractive to the reviewer, but the text should serve to introduce children to this little-known possession of the United States."

== See also ==
- Assateague Island
- Chincoteague Pony
