= Miracle at Moreaux =

1985 Canadian made-for-television drama film

- Based on: Twenty and Ten by Claire Huchet Bishop
- Written by: Jeffrey Cohen; Paul Shapiro
- Directed by: Paul Shapiro
- Starring: Loretta Swit; Robert Joy; Ken Pogue
- Music by: Jonathan Goldsmith
- Countries of origin: Canada; United States
- Original language: English

Production
- Executive producer: Lee Polk
- Producers: Janice Platt; Seaton McLean
- Production location: Toronto
- Cinematography: Rene Ohashi
- Editor: George Appleby
- Running time: 58 minutes
- Production company: Atlantis Films

Original release
- Network: PBS
- Release: December 2, 1985

Miracle at Moreaux is a 1985 Canadian made-for-television drama film based on the novel Twenty and Ten by Claire Huchet Bishop. The film stars Loretta Swit as the main character of Sister Gabrielle, and was co-written and directed by Paul Shapiro.

Set in France, the movie was filmed in Quebec and first aired 2 December 1985 on PBS as part of the series WonderWorks. It has been noted for its portrayal of Jewish children during World War II.

== Plot ==
In December 1943, three Jewish children in France are fleeing the Nazis toward a contact who will guide them into neutral Spain. A friend who has been guiding them tries to steal food for them from a Catholic convent/boarding school. However, his raid proves untimely, as Nazi officers arrive to tell the convent that roads in the area are being closed off to prevent possible escapes across the nearby border. Having been spotted, the man tries to run but is killed by the Germans. Seeing this, the youngest child runs toward the downed man, oblivious to the Germans' presence. In a quick act of thinking, Sister Gabrielle grabs the girl and pretends she is one of the convent's students, carrying her inside. After the Germans depart, the two other refugees also take cover inside the convent. They have arrived while the school is preparing to stage a Nativity pageant. After examining the body of the man who was guiding the children, the Germans found three forged Spanish passports that were made for the children. The Jewish children remain in the school while the Nazis are patrolling the area, led by an SS Major (Robert Joy), hunt for them in the woods surrounding the convent. Sister Gabrielle takes great lengths to keep the children's identities a secret, but the major is suspicious and continues to believe that Jewish refugees are hiding in the school after seeing the luggage belonging to the children when he came to apologize to Sister Gabrielle for the shooting incident earlier.

Meanwhile, the three children have to cope with negative attitudes towards Jews from the Catholic students at the boarding school. The Jewish students are able to gradually win over their classmates by teaching them about Judaism. Eventually, the entire school helps in the escape by dressing the Jewish and Catholic children in each other's clothing during a school outing. This stunt confuses and distracts the Nazi pursuers, who focus on the wrong children while the real Jewish children flee towards the border and escape into Spain. An older Nazi officer sees them, but lets them escape and reports that he didn't see them.

== Cast ==
- Loretta Swit as Sister Gabrielle
- Robert Joy as Major Braun
- Ken Pogue as Sgt. Schlimmer
- Geneviève Appleton as Jeannette
- Milan Cheylov as The Guide
- Simon Craig as André
- Thomas Hellman as Louis
- Robert Kosoy as Daniel
- Bonfield Marcoux as The Passer
- Marsha Moreau as Anna
- Carla Napier as Dominique
- Talya Rubin as Sabine

== Reception ==
The Los Angeles Times gave a negative review for the film, saying that the film didn't contain much drama and failed to make the story's setting understandable for the movie's target audience of children. In contrast, the Orlando Sentinel gave a more favorable review, calling the movie a "gem".
