= Christmas calendar =

Christmas calendar may refer to:

- The Christmas Calendar (2017 film), a Canadian made-for-TV film directed by Allan Harmon and starring Laura Bell Bundy
- A Christmas Calendar, a 1987 PBS holiday special hosted by Loretta Swit
- Advent calendar, a special calendar used to count the days of Advent
- Nordic Christmas calendar, a form of televised advent calendars in the Nordic countries

See also:

- The Holiday Calendar, a 2018 Netflix-premiered film directed by Bradley Walsh and starring Kat Graham
