= Pancakes-Paris =

1947 children's novel by Huchet Bishop

- First edition
- Author: Claire Huchet Bishop
- Illustrator: Georges Schreiber
- Language: English
- Genre: Children's literature
- Publisher: Viking
- Publication date: 1947
- Publication place: United States

Pancakes-Paris is a 1947 children's novel written by Claire Huchet Bishop and illustrated by Georges Schreiber. Set in Paris a few months after the end of World War II, it follows young boy Charles' quest to make crêpes for the Mardi Gras feast. While out, Charles gives two American G.I.s directions, and they repay him with a box of pancake mix. As the instructions are in English, he heads to the Embassy for help. Charles gets the instructions translated into French, and the same two G.I.s give him a lift home. At his house, Charles discovers he has no grease to fry the pancakes; the G.I.s help Chalres a third time when they arrive with not only the grease, but also other food, so Charles' family can have the best feast since before the war started.

== Reception ==
The novel was a Newbery Honor recipient in 1948, Bishop's first of two (1954).
