= Guy Pène du Bois =

American painter (1884–1958)

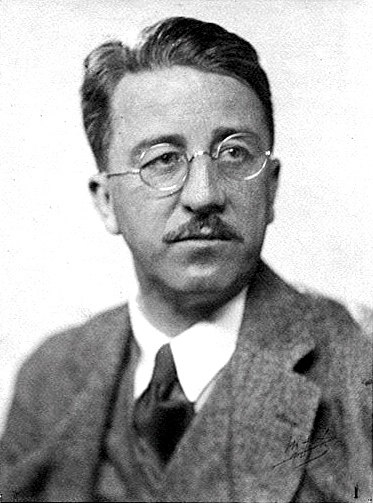
- c. 1912
- Born: January 4, 1884; Brooklyn, New York, U.S.
- Died: July 18, 1958 (aged 74); Boston, Massachusetts, U.S.
- Education: New York School of Art
- Known for: Painting

Guy Pène du Bois (January 4, 1884 – July 18, 1958) was a 20th-century American painter, art critic, and educator. Born in the U.S. to a French family, his work depicted the culture and society around him: cafes, theatres, and in the twenties, flappers.

== Artistic training ==
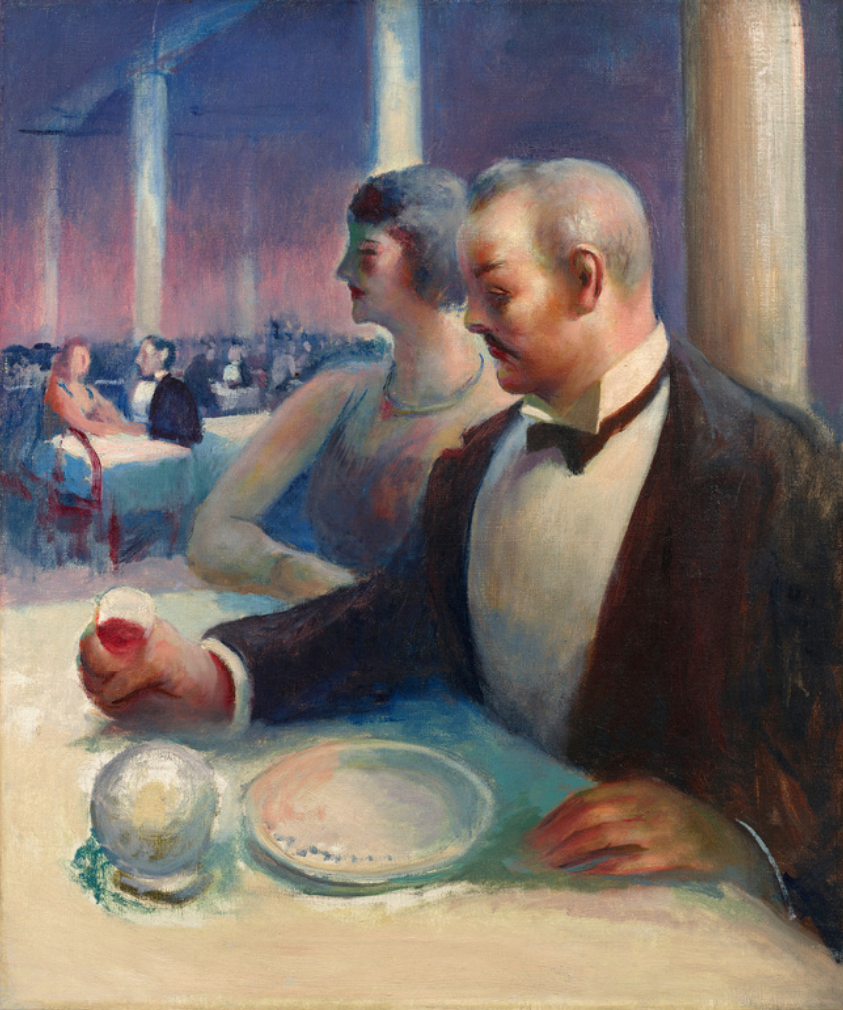
Supper Club, 1925

Pène du Bois began his artistic training in 1899, when he enrolled in the New York School of Art to study under the painter William Merritt Chase. In 1902 he enrolled in a painting class with Robert Henri, whose teachings lead Pène du Bois to focus more on everyday life in his own artwork. Pène du Bois traveled to Europe in 1905 to study under Théophile Steinlen, but returned to the U.S. upon his father's death the following year.

He was a close friend to Edward Hopper and was his best man for his wedding to Josephine Hopper. They remained lifelong friends.

== Illustrations and art criticism ==
Beginning in 1906, Pène du Bois worked as an illustrator and cartoonist for the New York American, and he began writing art criticism for the publication two years later. He became the editor of Arts and Decoration in 1913 and also wrote for the New York Post and the magazines The Arts and Arts Weekly. He was also one of the founders of the magazine Reality: A Journal of Artists' Opinions.

In 1940, he published his autobiography, Artists Say the Silliest Things.

His son was the French-American author and illustrator William Pène du Bois. His daughter was the painter Yvonne Pene du Bois.

The American artist Jerome Myers recalled his close friendship with Pène du Bois in his 1940 autobiography Artist in Manhattan: "Guy Pene du Bois has long been the auditor of my thoughts on art and life. Our contacts were so pleasurable and profitable. So often in his charming home circle, over our coffee, we would spend hours together, analyzing art conditions, forecasting the careers of various artists then commanding the spotlight, as well as of others whose light shone less brightly. I regret that I made no notes of our talks, for to me they were always an inspiration.

"Guy was then the noted art critic and painter; and even later, when he became the noted painter, he was still the art critic as well, coining his brief aphorisms with a dash of cosmopolitan cynicism, cool wisdom and dry humor. I regretted the intervention of his trips abroad; but our intimate conversations were resumed whenever opportunity afforded, Guy remaining as ever my real spiritual comrade. He was always a wise friend, a wise teacher, the possessor of an individual and rare skill in painting, his life a notable one, his contacts illustrious. I envy him only all that his history entails in names and places, covering so much of our present art history."

== Artwork ==
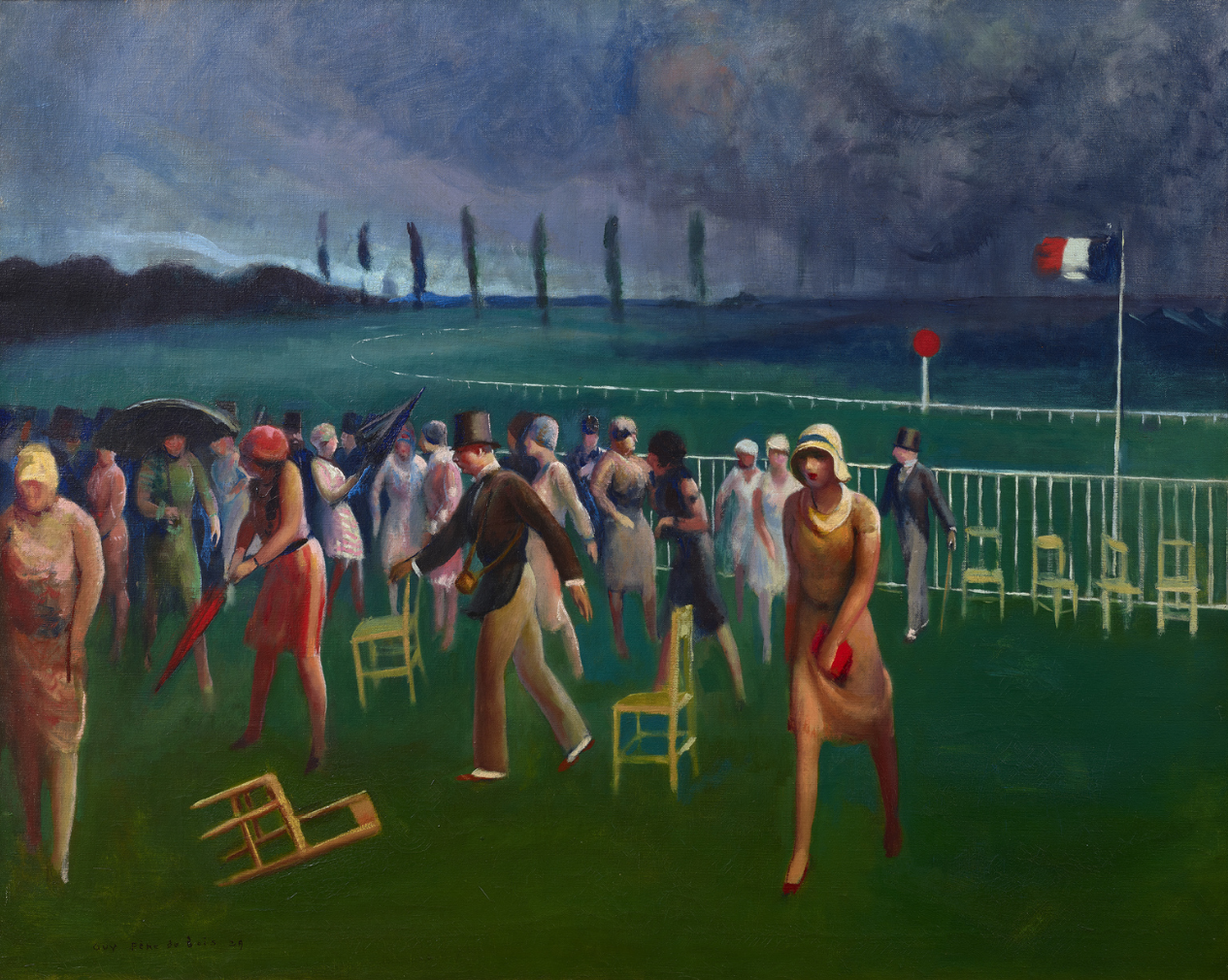
Approaching Storm, Racetrack, 1929

His work is in numerous museum collections, including the Smithsonian American Art Museum, the National Gallery of Art, the Phillips Collection, the Montgomery Museum of Fine Arts, the Brooklyn Museum, the Whitney Museum of American Art, the Pennsylvania Academy of the Fine Arts and the University of Virginia Art Museum. A mural by Pène du Bois titled "John Jay at His Home" was completed in 1938 and installed in the United States Post Office in Rye, NY during the WPA era. There is a mural by Guy Pène du Bois in the Saratoga Springs New York Post Office, "Saratoga in Racing Season" 1937, oil on canvas, two panels.

His work was also part of the painting event in the art competition at the 1932 Summer Olympics.

== Sources ==
- Guy Pène du Bois: The Twenties at Home and Abroad, Betsy Falhman. (1994)
