= Yvonne Pène du Bois =

American painter

- Born: July 3, 1913; Staten Island
- Died: September 2, 1997 (aged 84); Brookline, Massachusetts
- Known for: Artist

Yvonne Pène du Bois (1913–1997) was an American artist who specialized in architectural subjects and landscapes. She received her art education privately from her father, Guy Pène du Bois, and as a student at the Art Students League. She once said that her three greatest influences were her father, artist Edward Hopper, and architect Hugh Ferriss. She said she intended her paintings to evoke emotions and to be expressive rather than analytic. She worked almost entirely in oil-on-canvas. She painted in her studio from sketches made in the field.

During her career, she exhibited widely in both nonprofit and commercial galleries, including the Whitney Museum of American Art, the Art Institute of Chicago, and the Corcoran Gallery of Art. In 1985, the Graham Gallery in New York held a retrospective exhibition showcasing four decades of her work. Critics praised her for good draughtsmanship and handling of color. She spent most of her youth in France and later established her career in New York.

== Early life and training ==
In 1913 du Bois was born in the New York City borough of Staten Island and spent her early childhood in Greenwich Village. In 1924 the du Bois family moved to a tiny commune in central France so that her father could devote full time to painting. For the next four years she attended a boarding school in Versailles, and when, in 1928, her family moved to Nice, she completed her secondary education at a prestigious local day school. Du Bois later said drawing and painting came naturally to her and she was always the best student in these schools' art classes. After the Wall Street crash of 1929 caused an abrupt change in its finances, the family returned to New York. Guy Pène du Bois took a position as instructor at the Art Students League. Then aged 16, Du Bois began to work under him as a student and, somewhat later, became his assistant teacher. Her other teachers included Kenneth Hayes Miller, Kimon Nicolaïdes, William Von Schegell, and Thomas Hart Benton. She later said it was at first difficult for her to accept that her work at the league was no better than the work of other students.

== Career in art ==
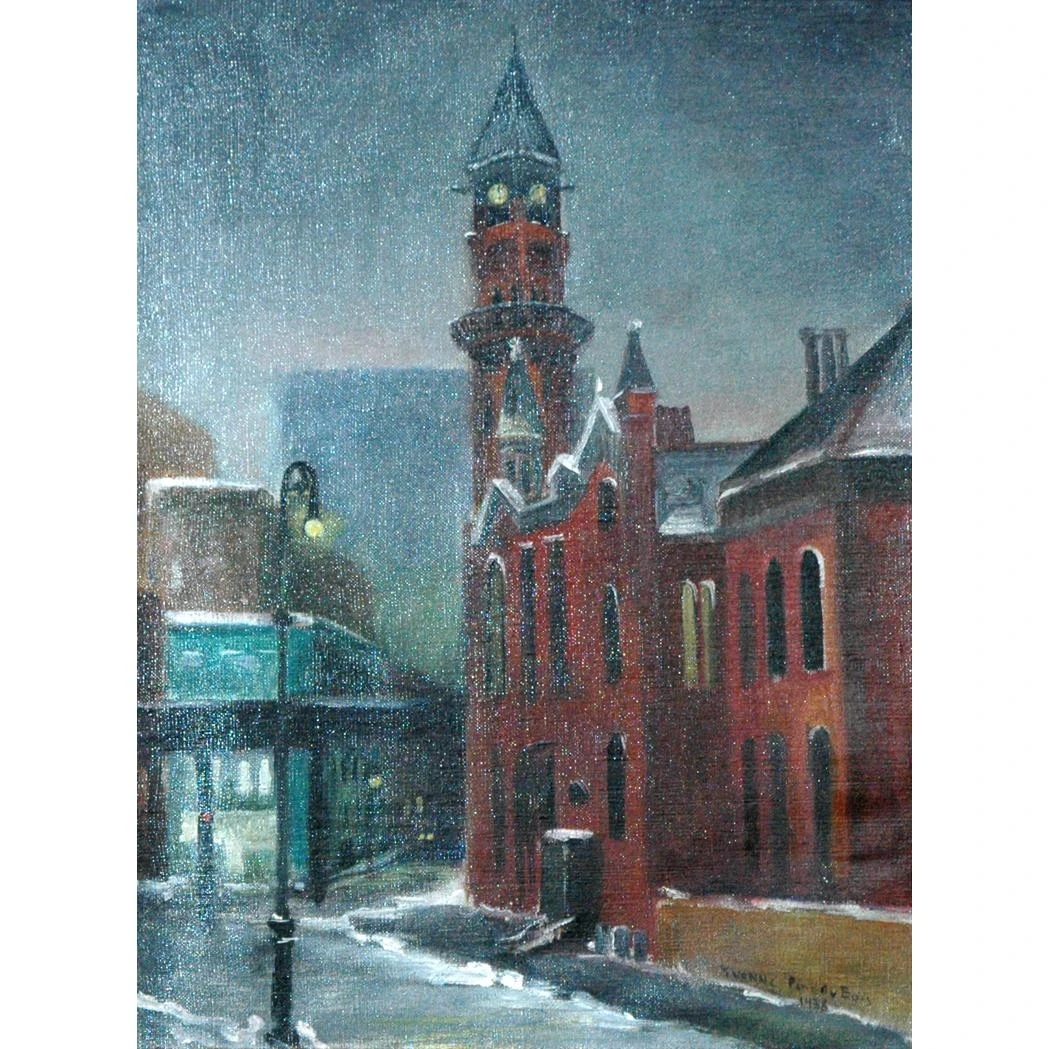
Yvonne Pène du Bois, 1938, Jefferson Market, oil on canvas, 16 × 22 inches

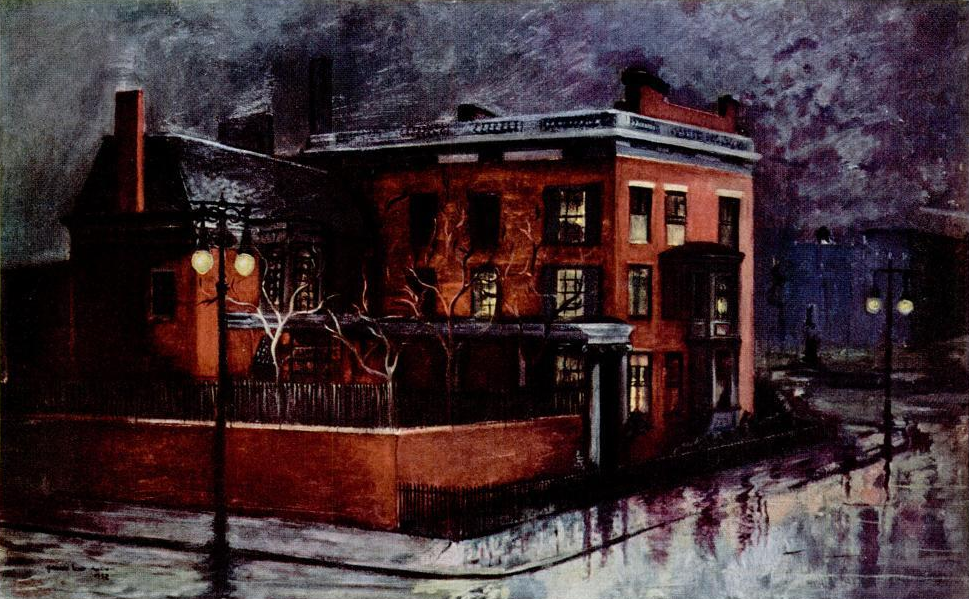
Yvonne Pène du Bois, 1938, Wanamaker House, oil on canvas

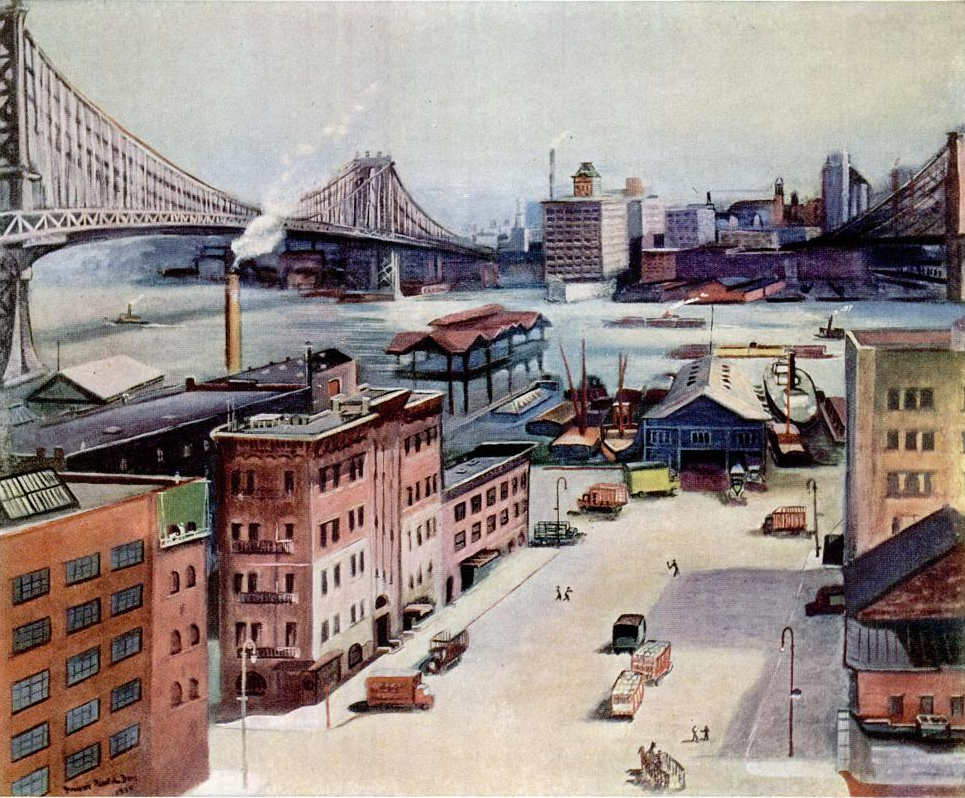
Yvonne Pène du Bois, 1939, East River, oil on canvas

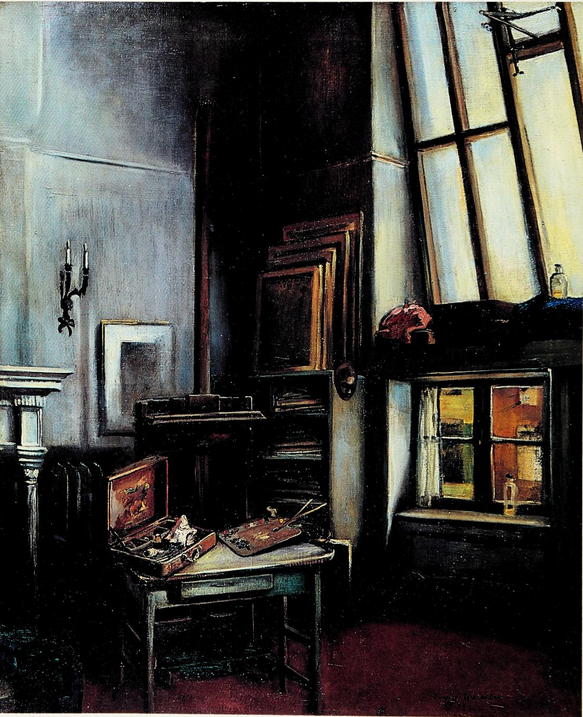
Yvonne Pène du Bois, 1945, Our Studio, oil on canvas

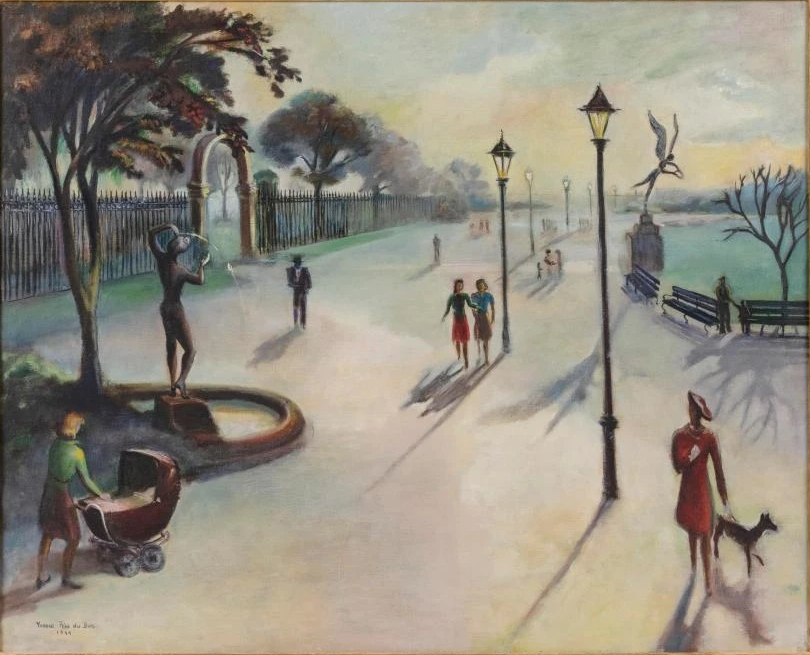
Yvonne Pène du Bois, 1946, Late Afternoon Paris, oil on canvas, 24 × 30 inches

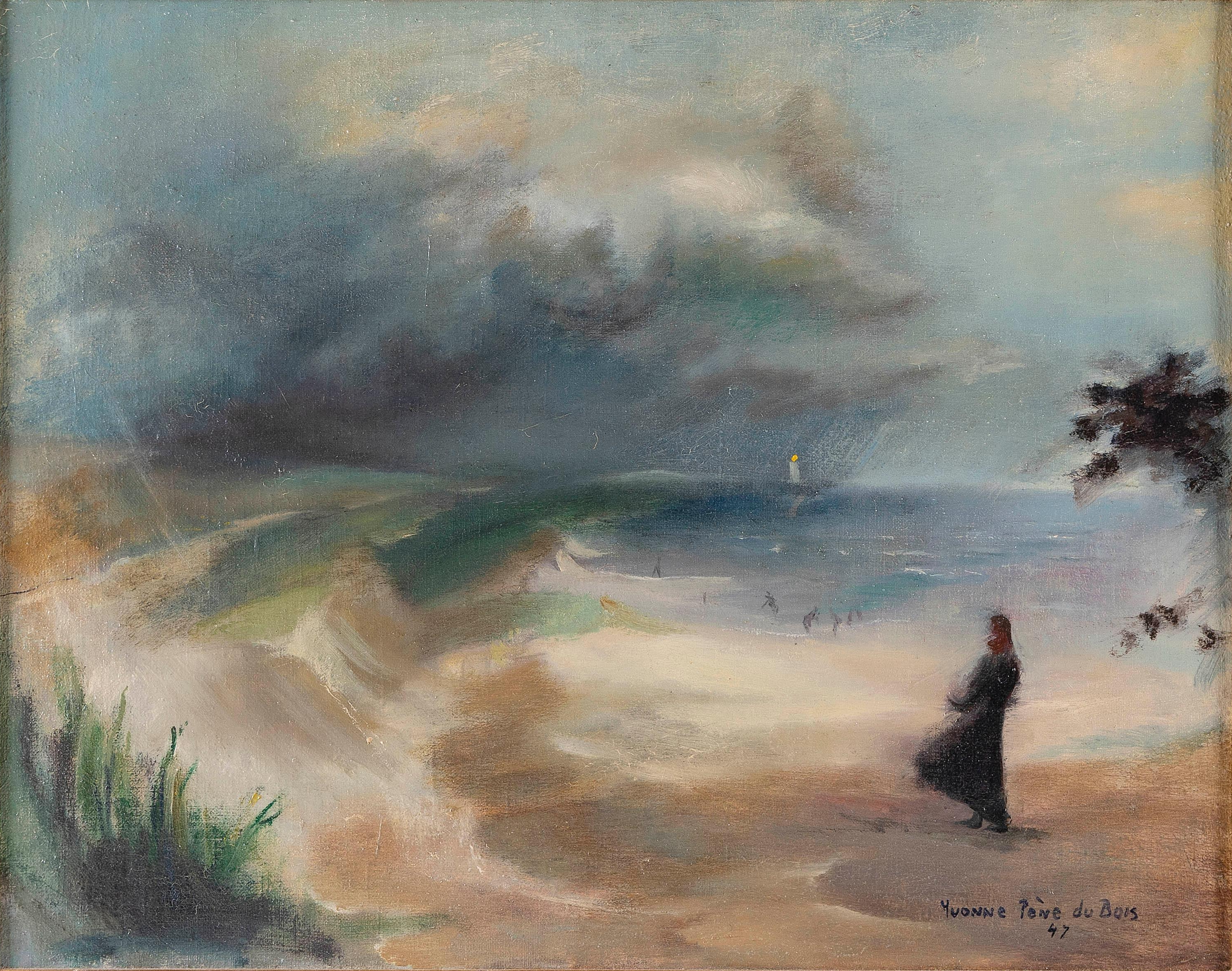
Yvonne Pène du Bois, 1947, Girl in a Storm, oil on canvas, 16 × 20 inches

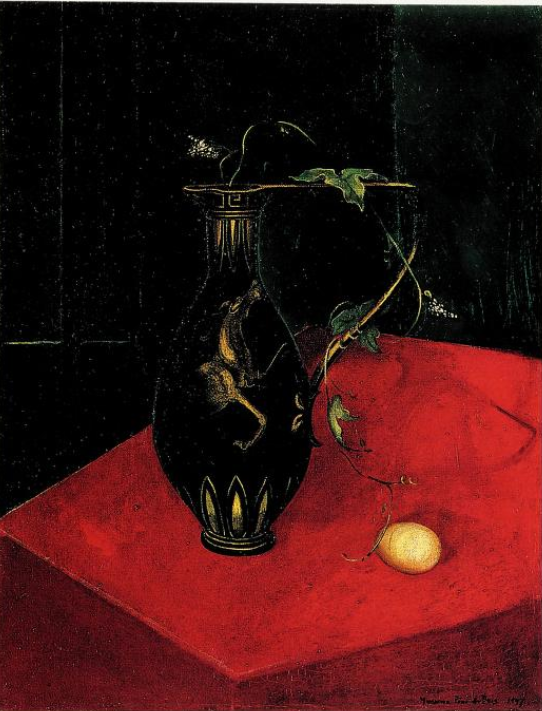
Yvonne Pène du Bois, 1947, Still Life, oil on canvas

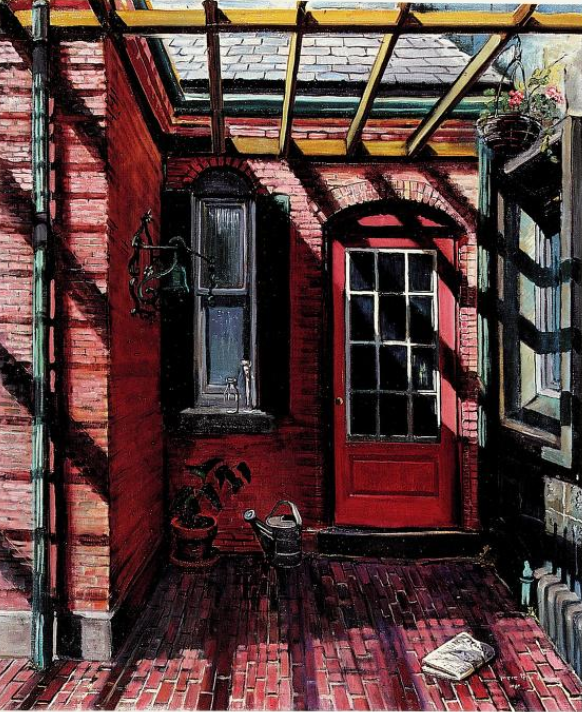
Yvonne Pène du Bois, Sunlight and Shadows, 1969, oil on canvas

In 1933 and 1937 du Bois participated in a group exhibitions at the Jumble Shop in Greenwich Village (Note: Located on 8th Street in Greenwich Village the Jumble Shop was a café that hosted informal art exhibitions. The proprietors, Frances E. Russell and Winifred J. Tucker, had opened the place as an antiques shop in the early 1920s. After they turned it into a tea room, it became an artists' hangout, with men such as du Bois's father and Reginald Marsh, selecting paintings to be shown in exhibitions that changed every month or so.) Two years later she showed with other young artists in an exhibition in the Squibb Building at Fifth Avenue and 57th Street. (Note: During the 1930s, the Squibb Building, now known as 745 Fifth Avenue, had a gallery on its 33rd floor where groups, notably the New York Society of Women Artists, held exhibitions.) The following year she was given a solo exhibition the gallery run by Theodore Kohn and Sons in Manhattan. Thereafter, her paintings appeared with some frequency in group shows held in non-profit venues, including the Municipal Art Committee in New York (1937), (Note: The Municipal Art Committee was established by New York Major Fiorello La Guardia in January 1935. There were 188 members. Mrs. Henry Breckenridge was chair.) the Corcoran Biennial (1939, 1941, 1943), the Golden Gate International Exposition (a world's fair, 1939), the Carnegie Institute in Pittsburgh, the Whitney Annual (1940, 1944), Art Institute of Chicago Annual (1940, 1944), and the Galerie Andre Maurice in Paris. Du Bois was represented by Kraushaar Galleries during the 1940s.

Reviewing the 1940 Whitney Annual, Edward Alden Jewell of the New York Times called "Dressing the Bride" by du Bois "a delicious bit of genre, reminiscent of an earlier American genre style, yet instinct, too, with the flavor of the young artist's own personality, and subtly of our own time." Following its appearance in the San Francisco World's Fair, a painting of hers called "Wanamaker House" was reproduced in Art Digest, American Painting Today, The Magazine of Art, and Life magazine.

New York galleries gave Du Bois solo exhibitions in 1936 and 1939. The first appeared in the gallery of Theodore A. Kohn & Son and the second at the Architectural League. Of the first, Howard Devree said she had made "a very auspicious beginning".

She continued to show in group exhibitions in the 1940s, including shows at the National Institute of Arts and Letters in 1950 and the Carnegie Institute in 1947 and 1949. In 1947 a critic said her painting "Introspection" revealed "great delicacy." In 1954 she produced the cover art for the Fall-Winter issue of The Paris Review and in 1960 she contributed paintings to an exhibition called "Artist Families", subtitled "Famous Families in American Art", at the Dallas Museum of Fine Arts.

In 1985 the Graham Gallery gave du Bois a retrospective exhibition containing 18 representative works from 1942 to 1979. (Note: Located in Manhattan, the gallery of James Graham & Sons began operation in 1857.)

=== Artistic style ===
Du Bois said she was interested in perspective and abstract composition. She called herself a romanticist. Her paintings, whether buildings, cityscapes, or interiors, evoked emotions. She called her landscapes "turbulent". She said, "When I paint people they are alone, lonely, introspective and beautiful."

She named Edward Hopper and Hugh Ferriss as her two biggest influences after her father, the first known best for the introspection and emotional resonance of his paintings, and the second for his exact perspective and dramatic treatment of skyscrapers and other urban structures he painted. Both men would drop by at her studio and criticize her work in progress. She said, "I don't remember changing anything, but I was flattered by their interest and did learn from both of them."

Along with an expressionist inclination, de Bois said she was interested in historical developments in art. She said she was "interested in architectural periods, in historical detail, in style, in decoration, whether it be on an arch or column, the hardware and graphics on drapes and furniture."

Critics credited du Bois with sound training and "superb draughtsmanship" and said she showed an "architectural strength" in some of her paintings.”

She normally painted in her studio from sketches and once told an interviewer that it was hardly possible to do otherwise on New York streets.

== Personal life and family ==
Du Bois was born on July 3, 1913, in Staten Island, New York. Her mother, Florence Sherman du Bois, designed and ran a factory that sewed expensive children's clothing. She had a younger brother, William Pène du Bois, who became an author and illustrator of children's books.

Du Bois attended a school she called Miss Bartow's before the family moved to France in 1924. Once there, they lived in a tiny commune called Gargilesse-Dampierre. Her mother ended her business career and put du Bois under the care of a French governess. From 1924 to 1928 Du Bois attended first a one-room school in the hamlet where they lived and then a boarding school called La Lycée des Jeunes Filles in Versailles. Du Bois later said the happiest year of her childhood began when the family moved to Nice in 1928. There, she attended an exclusive finishing school called Cours Moulins and, as she later said, "mingled with our parents in sophisticated society on the Riviera, in Nice, Monte Carlo and Cannes."

After the family returned to New York in 1929, du Bois lived with her parents while attending the Art Students League. She later said she had sometimes considered making a career as a writer or musician, but always felt that in the end she would choose art. She said painting came to her so naturally that it was not work at all.

In 1936 du Bois married a New York advertising executive named Houghton Field Furlong. They lived in New York City. They had no children and were divorced by 1953. In 1957 she married a steel merchant, James Harvey McKenney Jr. The couple had one child Clodagh Pène McKenney who grew up to be an artist who signed her paintings "Felix".

James McKenney died in 1983 while the couple were living in Brookline, Massachusetts. Du Bois remained living in Brookline for another 14 years; she died on September 2, 1997, from complications related to a stroke.
