= Paul Shapiro (director) =

Canadian director

- Born: 1955 (age 70–71)
- Occupations: Director, producer and writer
- Years active: 1980–present

Paul Shapiro (born 1955) is a Canadian television director, producer and writer, who has worked in both Canada and the United States.

== Life and career ==
He began his career in 1973 on the film Life Times Nine, an anthology of short films by high school students in Toronto which garnered a nomination for the Academy Award for Best Live Action Short Film in 1974. While a student at Ryerson Polytechnical Institute, he made the film The Understudy, which aired as a television film in 1976. His early credits included the television series Street Legal, Adderly, Road to Avonlea, Mom P.I. and The Campbells, and the television films Clown White (1981), Hockey Night (1984), Miracle at Moreaux (1986) and The Truth About Alex (1988).

He went on to amass number of notable television credits, including The X-Files, Millennium Dark Angel, Roswell, Smallville, Fastlane, Tru Calling, Heroes, Supernatural, Las Vegas, 24, Criminal Minds, Continuum and Rookie Blue.

He has also directed one theatrical feature film, The Lotus Eaters (1993).

He now works as a director at Seattle Academy.
