= Sweet 15 =

1990 American TV movie

- Theatrical release poster
- Genre: Drama
- Written by: Sharon Weil
- Screenplay by: Sharon Weil
- Directed by: Victoria Hochberg
- Starring: Karla Montana; Panchito Gómez; Jerry Stiller; Tony Plana
- Music by: Michael Aarvold
- Country of origin: United States
- Original languages: English; Spanish

Production
- Producers: Richard Soto; Sharon Weil
- Production location: Los Angeles
- Cinematography: Hal Trussell
- Running time: 120 minutes
- Budget: Unknown

Original release
- Release: January 15, 1990

Sweet 15 is a 1990 American made-for-television family drama film directed by Victoria Hochberg and starring Karla Montana, Panchito Gómez, Jerry Stiller, and Tony Plana. The plot concerns a fourteen-year-old girl whose dreams of having a perfect quinceañera are suddenly halted when she realizes that her family is residing in the United States illegally.

A WonderWorks film produced by PBS, is commonly shown in Spanish classes all over the country to teach about Hispanic culture. Hochberg received the 1990 Daytime Emmy Award for outstanding achievement in directing, special class, for her work on Sweet 15.

== Plot ==
Marta de la Cruz is the daughter of two hardworking Mexican immigrants. She and her two siblings were born in the United States and are living in Los Angeles. They are a working-class family, and their hardworking father, Samuel, is the operations manager of a steel mill that makes chain link fences, where he uses the fake name "Arturo Montoya". He has been working hard for much of his life, and the work finally paid off when they became legal citizens. They also have a close relationship with their next-door neighbor Jorge, who is struggling to find work because he has no papers. Marta is seen as spoiled, immature, and somewhat naive, but she wants to have an amazing quinceañera, as her friends are not having one. Her parents tell her that she may have to postpone it, because of financial problems, when in reality, they are not legal citizens, and they need to save money in case Samuel's boss, Mr. Waterman finds out and he is left jobless. Marta does not understand the situation and is very angry and upset. Her jealousy only increases when she is forced to get a job in their church to volunteer in the community.

She continues to plan, however, determined to have her "quince". At the same time, her friend Jacqueline pressures her to take their mutual friend Gabi's older cousin Ramon as her quince escort, but she is too shy, and Ramón is struggling with his inability to read or write.

Samuel knows that he has earned his citizenship, as he has worked hard and respected the laws and customs of America for over a decade, but as he has no papers, he cannot be. While working at the church one day, Marta discovers that Samuel is undocumented. Understandably, she becomes upset, and eventually confronts her father. The same day that Maria discovered her fathers status, despite Samuel's warnings, Jorge gets a job at a warehouse that is known for deporting illegal employees on pay day.

Despite her father's wishes for her to not date Ramón, she goes behind his back and enlists him for help in getting all of Samuel's previous employer's signatures, so he can get his papers. Meanwhile, Jorge is deported to Mexico when he fails to present his papers. Also, at Samuel's plant, more and more employees are being fired or deported, and Samuel fears he may be next, so he is hard at work trying to find a second job that does not require papers. Meanwhile, Marta gets all but one signature, and goes to an auto salvage yard for the last one, but the manager is rude, berates Marta with racial remarks, and stubbornly refuses to sign the papers. Marta is persistent, and the manager has a change of heart and signs the papers.

She presents her father with his signatures, and he sends them in for their papers. Soon after, he is given his temporary papers to show at his job, as it will be a while before their permanent papers arrive. Samuel thanks his daughter and they embrace. However, Marta is soon told that they found that she had been tampering with the files and she has to go inside. Expecting the worst, she discovers a surprise quince. During the quinceañera, Ramón shows Marta that he had learned to write.

== Cast ==
- Karla Montana as Marta de la Cruz
- Panchito Gómez as Ramón
- Jerry Stiller as Mr. Waterman
- Tony Plana as Samuel De la Cruz
- Robert Covarrubias as Jorge
- Laura P. Vega as Gabrielle 'Gaby' Corea
- Giselle Anthony as Jacqueline "Jackie"

== Reception ==
The New York Times said that Karla Montana "is positively beguiling" in the lead role. The Best Family Videos (1995) said that the film provides "a very compassionate look at the joys and sorrows among Hispanics trying to assimilate to American culture" while also celebrating their heritage.
