= William Pène du Bois =

American writer and illustrator (1916–1993)

William Sherman Pène du Bois
- Born: May 8, 1916; Nutley, New Jersey
- Died: February 5, 1993 (aged 76); Nice, France
- Education: Lycée Hoche, Versailles, France
- Known for: author, illustrator of books for young readers
- Notable work: The Twenty-One Balloons; Bear Party
- Spouses: Jane Michèle Bouche (m. 1943) Willa Kim (m. 1955)
- Partner: Reneclair Sinreich
- Awards: Newbery Award; 1948 The Twenty-One Balloons

William Sherman Pène du Bois (Note: The writer and illustrator is "William Sherman Pène Du Bois", surname "Pène Du Bois", in prose "Pène du Bois" and also "Billy", in the historical-biographical sketch at the New York Public Library where the Manuscripts and Archives Division holds his papers. Contemporary Authors Online (Gale, 2003) is the primary biographical source cited there. He is "William Pène Sherman du Bois", in prose "du Bois", in his Encyclopædia Britannica biographical entry. The Library of Congress catalogs both father Guy and son William under "Pène du Bois" primarily (Yvonne and Raoul under "Du Bois"). The proper form of her father's name is "Pène du Bois, Guy" according to a 1985 letter from daughter Yvonne to the Smithsonian Institution.) (May 9, 1916 – February 5, 1993) was an American writer and illustrator of books for young readers. He is best known for The Twenty-One Balloons, published in April 1947 by Viking Press, for which he won the 1948 Newbery Medal. He was twice a runner-up for the Caldecott Medal for illustrating books written by others, and the two Caldecott Honor picture books, which he also wrote.

From 1953 to 1960, Pène du Bois was art editor of The Paris Review, working alongside founder and editor George Plimpton.

== Early life ==
William Pène du Bois was born in Nutley, New Jersey in May 1916. His mother was Florence Sherman Pène du Bois who worked as a children's fashion designer until "Billy" was about seven years old. His father Guy Pène du Bois was a noted art critic and a painter known for landscapes and portraits. His older sister Yvonne (born 1913, later Yvonne Pène du Bois McKenney) would become a painter and their cousin Raoul Pene Du Bois would become a noted costume and scenic designer. Their Du Bois ancestors had moved from France to New Orleans in 1738.

When William was eight the family moved to France, where he was educated at the Lycée Hoche in Versailles and the Lycée de Nice in Nice. They returned to Nutley when he was 14. After high school he was accepted by the Carnegie Technical School of Architecture, and offered a scholarship, but he sold a book that he had written and illustrated to pass the time during a vacation and pursued the creation of books rather than college. Thomas Nelson & Sons accepted Elisabeth, the Cow Ghost in 1935, when he was nineteen, and published it in 1936.

== Writing career ==
By the time he entered the army in March 1941 at age 24, he had written and illustrated five more books. He spent his years in the army (1941–1945) with an artillery unit stationed in Bermuda. He worked as a correspondent for Yank magazine. He also edited the camp newspaper and illustrated strategic maps.

In addition to writing and illustrating his own books, Pène du Bois illustrated books written by Jules Verne, Isaac Bashevis Singer, Rumer Godden, Claire Huchet Bishop and John Steinbeck, as well as magazine articles and advertisements. In 1960 he developed an interest in vintage cars, going to great pains and expense to refurbish a 1931 Brewster Croydon Coupe Rolls-Royce P11.

He was one of the founding editors of The Paris Review along with Thomas Guinzburg, Harold L. Humes, Peter Matthiessen, George Plimpton, and John P. C. Train, and designed the publication's logo. He illustrated The Rabbit's Umbrella by George Plimpton, published in 1955.

The highlight of his career was winning the Newbery Medal in 1948 for The Twenty-One Balloons. As an illustrator he was a runner-up for the companion Caldecott Medal in 1952 for Bear Party and in 1957 for Lion. He was the illustrator for Claire Huchet Bishop's Twenty and Ten, which won the Child Study Association of America's Children's Book Award (now Josette Frank) in 1952.

Some of his books including Bear Party and Lion are children's picture books with a minimum of text. The Twenty-One Balloons, however – and others including The Three Policemen, The Great Geppy, Squirrel Hotel, Peter Graves and The Giant – appeal to all ages. These books exhibit whimsical ingenuity in story and illustrations. Though not usually so classified, these books seem to qualify as science fiction. Their interest lies more in their imaginative elaboration of ideas than in their characters. Some of his fictional ideas are fantastic but many are plausible, and some such as the Balloon Merry-Go-Round in The Twenty-one Balloons may be feasible. Many show the influence of Jules Verne.

Many of his papers are in the collection of the New York Public Library, Humanities and Social Sciences Library, Manuscripts and Archives Division.

== Personal life ==
Pène du Bois married Jane Michèle Bouche of Manhattan, daughter of artist Louis Bouche, in 1943. They later divorced and in 1955 he married theatrical costume designer Willa Kim.

Children's book illustrator Margot Tomes was a cousin, as was theatrical costume and set designer Raoul Pene Du Bois.

He died on February 5, 1993, in Nice, France, from a stroke.

== Books ==
=== As writer ===
- Elisabeth, the Cow Ghost (Thomas Nelson, 1936) OCLC 18172602
- Giant Otto & Otto at Sea (1936)

A giant dog named Otto (akin to Clifford the Big Red Dog) goes on a voyage.

- The 3 Policemen, or, Young Bottsford of Farbe Island (1938)

The ingenuity of ten-year-old Bottsford enables the three clownish policemen of an isolated idyllic isle to catch thieves who have been stealing the islanders' fish and fishing nets.

- The Great Geppy (1940) – his fifth book published, featured on one page of a Life magazine story about his family

A striped horse (NOT a zebra) is hired to solve a robbery at a circus. To investigate the crime, Geppy poses as a variety of circus entertainers, including a freak, a tightrope walker, and a lion tamer. In the end he discovers that there has not been any theft; rather, the culprit has been breaking into the company safe to contribute money to the financially struggling circus. For his success, Geppy is honored as a hero and is even appointed the circus's newest star: he gives an extraordinary performance when shot from a cannon.

- The Flying Locomotive (1941)
- The Twenty-One Balloons (1947)

A schoolteacher who decides to spend a year in a balloon but, because of an accident, crashes on Krakatoa. It turns out that the island is populated by twenty families who share the wealth of a secret diamond mine. They have used their wealth to build elaborate houses which also serve as restaurants. They have a calendar with a 20-day month. On A day, everyone eats in Mr. and Mrs. A's American restaurant; on B day, in Mrs. and Mrs. B's British chop house; on C day, in Mr. and Mrs. C's Chinese restaurant; on D day, in Mr. and Mrs. D's Dutch restaurant, and so forth. When Krakatoa explodes, the families and the protagonist escape on a flying platform lofted by twenty balloons.

- Peter Graves: An Extraordinary Adventure (1950)

A well-meaning but mischievous boy who encounters a gentlemanly and not-very-mad scientist named Houghton Furlong. Furlong is the inventor of an antigravity material named Furloy, and a Furloy-based invention called "the ball that bounces higher than the height from which you drop it." In an unfortunate accident with the latter invention, Peter destroys Houghton's house. Little of value is left in the wreckage except six balls of Furloy, each about the size of a golf ball, with an antigravity pull of 25 pounds-force (110 newtons) each. Peter commits himself to spending the summer with Houghton in an attempt to earn the $45,000 necessary to rebuild his house. The implied puzzle is: how can Peter and Houghton make use of the six Furloy balls to earn $45,000?

- Bear Party (1951)
- Squirrel Hotel (1952)

A bittersweet story about a man who builds an elaborate hotel for squirrels, with illustrations of the dollhouse-like structure full of squirrels sniffing, playing, sliding down spiral slides, and generating electricity for the lighting by running around a squirrel cage. The man disappears and the narrator tries to find him by tracing his purchases (48 miniature four-poster beds; 1 gross flashlight bulbs; 2 electric motors, Meccano; 6 American flags; etc.).

- The Giant (1954)

An eight-year-old boy is seven stories tall because he has "a perfect digestive system": if the boy eats one pound of food, he gains one pound of body mass. Illustrations show the various arrangements made by family and friends to take care of him. He is sweet and well-mannered, but great effort is taken to conceal him because of the fear and hostility giants arouse. The narrator befriends him and comes up with a plan to introduce him to the public in such a way that they will accept him, so he will not need to spend his life in concealment.

- Lion (1956)

An angel tries to design the animal known to us as a lion. This angel is new to the skill of designing animals, and his first few attempts are reviewed by his fellow artists as lacking for one reason or another. The angel perseveres and eventually Lion is perfected. It is a story about art, artists, creativity, and finding one's place in the world – for both the angel (amidst his fellow angels) and the lion.

- Castles and Dragons (1958)
- Otto in Texas (1959)

Otto the giant dog visits Texas, where he discovers a dinosaur skeleton and a tunnel used by oil rustlers.

- Otto In Africa (1961)

Further adventures of Otto the giant dog.

- The Three Little Pigs (1962) – the familiar story is told in verse
- The Alligator Case (1965)
- Lazy Tommy Pumpkinhead (1966)

A boy lives in an electric house that automatically tips him out of bed into the bath, dresses him and feeds him breakfast every morning without requiring him to move a muscle. After each morning routine he yawningly climbs up a staircase that takes him until bedtime to reach the top of, at which point he tiredly goes to bed and sleeps until next morning's automatic wakeup. However, a power failure incapacitates the entire house and causes Tommy to sleep for seven days. When the power resumes, his bed tips him into seven-day-cold water. Shivering and struggling to get out of the tub, he lands upside-down in his clothes, is showered with a seven-day backup of breakfast food, and ends up sitting in a big mess on the floor. This serves as a moral to children not to be lazy, but to arise promptly every morning, take their own bath, and dress and feed themselves.

- The Horse in the Camel Suit (1967)

The town policeman, in a huff, locks up a show troupe and a young detective contrives to set them free without hurting the policeman's feelings. He discovers, however, that they actually are criminals, and he must get them behind bars again.

- Pretty Pretty Peggy Moffitt (1968)

A vanity obsessed girl who loves looking at herself suffers many accidents.

- Porko von Popbutton (1969)

On gluttony, in a series on the seven deadly sins, a 274-pound thirteen-year-old boy whose sole passion is food is miserable when sent to boarding school until he accidentally gets on the hockey team. Also published under the title of "Beat the Queen" in Sports Illustrated of December 23, 1968.

- Otto And The Magic Potatoes (1970)

Further adventures of Otto the giant dog.

- Call Me Bandicoot (1970)

A fast-talking young man entertains passengers on the Staten Island Ferry in exchange for food and money; serialized in Children's Digest

- Bear Circus (1971)
- Mother Goose for Christmas (Viking, 1973), picture book
- The Forbidden Forest (1978)

Lady Adelaide, a boxing kangaroo, helps to defeat the German army, thus becoming a heroine of the Great War.

- Gentleman Bear (1985)

A story about a London gentleman and his inseparable companion of over seventy years, his teddy bear.

=== As illustrator only ===
- The Mousewife, written by Rumer Godden (Viking Press, 1951).
- Twenty and Ten, by Claire Huchet Bishop as told by Janet Joly (Viking, 1952), OCLC 297331 – also published by Scholastic as The Secret Cave, OCLC 767735471.
- The Great Dog Robbery, written by Dodie Smith, published serially in Woman's Day, June–September 1956.
- Castles and Dragons: Read-to-yourself fairy tales for boys and girls, compiled by the Child Study Association of America (Thomas Y. Crowell Co., 1958), 292 pp., OCLC 302982.
- A Certain Small Shepherd, Rebecca Caudill (Holt, Rinehart and Winston, 1965).
- The Magic Finger, Roald Dahl (Allen & Unwin; Harper & Row, 1966) – later editions illustrated by Pat Mariott, Tony Ross, and Quentin Blake.
- The Topsy-Turvy Emperor of China, Isaac Bashevis Singer (Harper & Row, 1971).
- William's Doll, Charlotte Zolotow (Harper & Row, 1972).
- My Grandson Lew, Charlotte Zolotow (Harper & Row, 1974).
- Bear in Mind: A book of bear poems, selected by Bobbye S. Goldstein (Viking Kestrel, 1989), picture book, OCLC 18832873.
- Harriet, by Charles McKinley Jr. (Viking Press, 1946).
