= Twenty and Ten =

American children's novel

- Author: Claire Huchet Bishop
- Illustrator: William Pène du Bois
- Language: English
- Genre: Children's novel
- Publisher: Viking Press
- Publication date: 1952
- Publication place: United States
- Media type: Print
- Pages: 76

Twenty and Ten is an American children's novel written by Claire Huchet Bishop and illustrated by William Pène du Bois, first published in 1952 by Viking Press. In 1973 it was republished with minor revisions as The Secret Cave.

Set in Beauvallon, Rhône, France in 1944, near the end of the Nazi occupation, it is a story about twenty French fifth-graders who helped shelter ten Jewish children from Nazi soldiers. May Hill Arbuthnot called it "exciting, often exceedingly funny and full of the gallantry of decent human beings".

In 1985 it was filmed as Miracle at Moreaux.
