= The Twenty-One Balloons =

1947 book by William Pène du Bois

- First edition
- Author: William Pène du Bois
- Illustrator: William Pène du Bois
- Cover artist: William Pène du Bois
- Language: English
- Genre: Children's novel
- Publisher: The Viking Press
- Publication date: 1947
- Publication place: United States
- Media type: Print (hardcover and paperback)
- Pages: 181
- ISBN: 0-14-032097-0
- OCLC: 17885994

The Twenty-One Balloons is a novel by William Pène du Bois, published in 1947 by the Viking Press and awarded the Newbery Medal for excellence in American children's literature in 1948. The story is about a retired schoolteacher whose ill-fated balloon trip leads him to discover Krakatoa, an island full of great wealth and fantastic inventions. The events and ideas are based both on scientific fact and imagination, and the descriptions are accompanied by illustrations by du Bois.

The novel depicts the 1883 eruption of Krakatoa.

== Plot summary ==
The introduction compares two types of journeys: one that aims to reach a place within the shortest time, and another that begins without regard to speed and without a destination in mind. Balloon travel is said to be ideal for the second kind.

The main story begins with the rescue of Professor William Waterman Sherman, who is picked up by a steamship while floating among a strange wreck of twenty deflated gas balloons in the North Atlantic. Sherman, a recently retired schoolteacher, was last seen three weeks earlier leaving San Francisco on a giant balloon, determined to spend a year drifting alone, relaxing on the balloon basket house. The world waits breathlessly to find out how Sherman could have circumnavigated the globe in record time and landed in the ocean with twenty balloons rather than the one with which he began his journey. After several days' rest and a hero's welcome, the professor recounts his journey before a captivated audience.

Sherman's uneventful flight over the Pacific Ocean was serene until an unfortunate accident involving a seagull puncturing his balloon forced him to crash land on a small volcanic island. He is befriended by Mr. F who informs him that he has landed on the island of Krakatoa and it is populated by twenty families sharing the wealth of a secret diamond mine - by far the richest in the world - which they operate as a cartel. Each year, the families sail to the outside world with a small amount of diamonds, to purchase supplies for the hidden and sophisticated civilization they have built on the island (they explain that introducing too many diamonds into the market at once would drive down their value to "a shipload of broken glass"). Each family has been assigned one of the first twenty letters of the alphabet, and lives in its own whimsical and elaborate house that also serves as a restaurant. The Krakatoa society follows a calendar with twenty-day months. On "A" Day of each month, everyone eats in Mr. and Mrs. A's American restaurant; on "B" Day, in Mr. and Mrs. B's British chop house; on "C" Day, in Mr. and Mrs. C's Chinese restaurant; on "D" Day, in Mr. and Mrs. D's Dutch restaurant, and so forth. Sherman's first friend on the island, Mr. F, runs a French restaurant containing a replica of the Hall of Mirrors. The houses are full of incredible items, such as Mr. M's Moroccan house, which has a living room with mobile furniture that operate like bumper cars. The children of the island invented their own form of amusement that combines elements from merry-go-rounds and balloon travel.

When the volcano on Krakatoa erupts, the families and Sherman escape on a platform held aloft by twenty balloons. As the platform drifts westward around the world, the families parachute off to India and Belgium to start their new lives. Sherman remains on the platform and finally descends onto the waters of the Atlantic Ocean, where he is rescued. The professor concludes his speech by telling the audience he intends to build an improved balloon for a year of life in the air, financed by the diamond cufflinks he obtained in Krakatoa.

== Comparison to The Diamond as Big as the Ritz ==
The story is preceded by a note from du Bois, informing that just before publication his publisher noted a "strong resemblance" between the book and The Diamond as Big as the Ritz, a novella written by F. Scott Fitzgerald in 1922. Du Bois acknowledges it is "not only quite similar in general plot, but was also altogether a collection of very similar ideas." He says it was the first time he had heard of Fitzgerald's story, and "the fact that F. Scott Fitzgerald and I apparently would spend our billion in like ways right down to being dumped from bed into a bathtub is, quite frankly, beyond my explanation."

The two stories share the common concept of a giant diamond mine and the resulting need to protect the secret of its existence. However, they differ significantly in tone and plot details. Fitzgerald's story does not involve balloons, nor a Utopian society on Krakatoa, nor fantastic mechanical inventions like those described in du Bois's story. Fitzgerald's story also takes a darker tone, with the mad owner of the mine having constructed a hollow in the earth to imprison the unfortunates who had discovered the mine. The story's protagonist has a sexual encounter with the daughter of the mine owner, and discovers that he faces execution.

The stories also differ in their intentions and audiences. The Twenty-One Balloons is a children's story, with only a mild, playful interest in social commentary. By contrast, "The Diamond as Big as the Ritz" is a parable for adults; it articulates large social themes that preoccupied Fitzgerald throughout his career as a mature writer, and which found their way into his major novels, notably The Great Gatsby.

== In popular culture ==
In the TV show Mad Men, season four, episode five ("The Chrysanthemum and the Sword"), The Twenty-One Balloons is being read by a child, Sally Draper.

Awards
Preceded by Miss Hickory	Newbery Medal recipient 1948	Succeeded by King of the Wind
