= Claire Huchet Bishop =

American writer

- Born: 30 December 1898; Switzerland
- Died: 13 March 1993 (aged 94); Paris, France
- Education: Sorbonne, University of Paris
- Known for: Writing, writer, children's literature, poet, lecturer, editor
- Notable work: The Five Chinese Brothers, Pancakes-Paris, All Alone, and Twenty and Ten

Claire Huchet Bishop (30 December 1898 – 13 March 1993) was a Swiss children's writer and librarian. She wrote two Newbery Medal runners-up, Pancakes-Paris (1947) and All Alone (1953), and she won the Josette Frank Award for Twenty and Ten (1952). Her first English-language children's book became a classic: The Five Chinese Brothers, illustrated by Kurt Wiese and published in 1938, was named to the Lewis Carroll Shelf Award list in 1959.

== Life ==
Claire Huchet was born in Geneva, Switzerland and grew up in France or Geneva. She attended the Sorbonne and started the first children's library in France. After marrying the American concert pianist Frank Bishop, she moved to the United States, worked for the New York City Public Library from 1932–36, and was an apologist for Roman Catholicism and an opponent of antisemitism.

She was a lecturer and storyteller throughout the US and was a children's book editor for Commonweal for some time.

Bishop was the President of the International Council of Christians and Jews from 1975–77 and the Amitié judéo-chrétienne de France (Jewish-Christian Fellowship of France) from 1976-81.

Two of her books were made into films.

After residing in New York for 50 years, Bishop returned to France and died in Paris in 1993. She was 94 years old and died of a hemorrhage of the aorta.

== Awards ==
- 1947 New York Herald Tribune Spring Book Festival prize for the book Pancakes Paris
- 1948 Newbery Medal runner-up for Pancakes-Paris
- 1952 Well-Met Children's Book Award, Child Study Association of America also known as the Josette Frank award for Twenty and Ten
- 1959 Lewis Carroll Shelf Award list for The Five Chinese Brothers
- 1988 Nicholas and Hedy International Brotherhood award
- All Alone was a runner-up for the Newbery Medal and was chosen as the best-liked book by the Boys' Club of America

== Works ==
=== Children's books ===
- 1938 The Five Chinese Brothers, illustrated by Kurt Wiese
- 1940 The King's Day, illus. Doris Spiegel
- 1941 The Ferryman, illus. Wiese
- 1942 The Man Who Lost His Head, illus. Robert McCloskey
- 1945 Augustus, illus. Grace Paul
- 1947 Pancakes-Paris, illus. Georges Schreiber
- 1948 Blue Spring Farm, a novel, LCCN 48-2029
- 1950 Christopher The Giant, illus. Berkeley Williams, Jr.
- 1952 Bernard and His Dogs, illus. Maurice Brevannes – about Saint Bernard de Menthon, LCCN 52-7143
- 1952 Twenty and Ten, by Bishop "as told by Janet Joly", illus. William Pène du Bois, OCLC 297331 (re-published with minor edits in 1969 and 1973 as The Secret Cave by Scholastic)
- 1953 All Alone, illus. Feodor Rojankovsky
- 1954 Martín de Porres, Hero, illus. Jean Charlot – about Saint Martín de Porres
- 1955 The Big Loop, illus. Carles Fontserè – about the Tour de France
- 1956 Happy Christmas: Tales for Boys and Girls, edited by Bishop, illus. Ellen Raskin
- 1957 Toto's Triumph, illus. Claude Ponsot
- 1960 French Roundabout, 360 pp. illus. – LCSH France—Description and travel, LCCN 60-6027; revised 1966
- 1960 Lafayette: French-American Hero, illus. Maurice Brevannes
- 1961 A Present from Petros, illus. Dimitris Davis
- 1964 Twenty-Two Bears, illus. Wiese
- 1966 Yeshu, Called Jesus, illus. Donald Bolognese
- 1968 Mozart: Music Magician, illus. Paul Frame
- 1971 The Truffle Pig, illus. Wiese
- 1972 Johann Sebastian Bach: Music Giant, illus. Russell Hoover
- 1973 Georgette, illus. Ursula Landshoff

=== Adult books ===
- 1938 French Children's Books for English-speaking Children (New York: Sheridan Square Press), bibliography, LCCN 39-1262
- 1947 France Alive. LCCN 48-5494
- 1950 All Things Common. LCCN 50-10448
- 1950 Boimondau: A French Community of Work
- 1971 Jesus and Israel by Jules Isaac, edited with a foreword by Claire Huchet Bishop; translated from French by Sally Gran
- 1974 How Catholics look at Jews: Inquiries into Italian, Spanish, and French Teaching Materials. LCCN 73-91371

=== Other Writings ===
- (Editor) Jules Isaac, Has Anti-semitism Roots in Christianity?, National Conference of Christians and Jews, 1961.
- (Editor) Isaac, The Teaching of Contempt, Holt, 1964.
- Poetry to some French avant-garde literary magazines

== Quotes ==
- "Government is too big and too important to be left to the politicians."
- "Those who marry to escape something usually find something else."
