= Lion (picture book) =

1957 Caldecott picture book

- Author: William Pène du Bois
- Publisher: Viking
- Publication date: 1956
- Pages: unpaged
- Awards: Caldecott Honor

Lion is a 1956 picture book written and illustrated by William Pène du Bois. The book tells the story of an "artist" who attempts to invent a cloud lion. The book was a recipient of a 1957 Caldecott Honor for its illustrations.
