= The Man Who Lost His Head (book) =

1942 picture book by Claire Huchet Bishop

- Early edition cover
- Author: Claire Huchet Bishop
- Illustrator: Robert McCloskey
- Publisher: Viking Press
- Publication date: 1942
- ISBN: 1-590-17332-5

The Man Who Lost His Head is a 1942 children's picture book written by Claire Huchet Bishop and illustrated by Robert McCloskey.

== Plot ==
The alarm clock rings as a headless man gets out of bed. He searches for the head everywhere and sits down trying to remember that he lost his head. The headless man takes off his pajamas and gets dressed and can't go out as a headless fellow. He puts on his tuxedo and takes his hat, goes to the vegetable garden and takes a pumpkin and carves holes in it and makes a face. The village people see the man with a pumpkin head. He goes back to the vegetable garden, removes the pumpkin head, and takes a parsnip and carves holes in it and makes a face. The village people see the man with a parsnip head. He goes to the woodshed and takes a log and carves a wooden head and makes a face while he sandpapers and polishes it. He removes the parsnip head and puts on the wooden head. This is the perfect head made of wood for a man. He goes to the fair for a perfect head. He wins the cup and goes on the merry-go-round. He sees the wild animals and touches a tiger. The tiger roars at the man with a wooden head. The man meets a boy at the fair and tells him his woes, and the boy solves the mystery of the man's missing head.

== Versions ==
- The man with his head in the clouds walking with a pig and cat
- The headless man walking with a magnifying glass to the fair
