= The Five Chinese Brothers =

American children's book

- Author: Claire Huchet Bishop
- Illustrator: Kurt Wiese
- Language: English
- Genre: Children's books, picture books
- Publisher: Coward-McCann
- Publication date: 1938
- Publication place: United States
- ISBN: 978-0-698-11357-2
- OCLC: 50015354

The Five Chinese Brothers is an American children's book written by Claire Huchet Bishop and illustrated by Kurt Wiese. It was originally published in 1938 by Coward-McCann. The book is a retelling of a Chinese folk tale, Ten Brothers.

== Plot ==
In the Imperial China of the Qing dynasty, there are five brothers who "all looked exactly alike." They each possess a special talent: the first brother can swallow the sea, the second has an unbreakable iron neck, the third can stretch his legs to incredible lengths, the fourth is immune to burning, and the fifth can hold his breath forever. The five live with their mother by the sea. The first brother, a fisherman, is able to catch rare fish that sell at the market quite well, allowing the family to live comfortably. One day, he agrees to let a young boy accompany him on his fishing trip. He holds the entire sea in his mouth so that the boy can retrieve fish and other sea treasures from the seabed. When he can no longer hold in the sea, he frantically signals for the boy to return to shore. The boy ignores him, and then drowns in the sea when the man is forced to expel the water.

The first brother returns alone, and is accused of murder and sentenced to death. However, one by one, his four brothers assume his place before four attempts at execution. They are each able to carry forth this deception, by convincing the judge to let them return home briefly to bid their mother goodbye, before each method of execution is attempted. The second brother, with his iron neck, cannot be beheaded; the third brother, with his ability to stretch his legs all the way to the bottom of the ocean, cannot be drowned; the fourth brother, with his immunity to burning, is unharmed at the stake, and the fifth brother, with his ability to hold his breath, survives overnight in an oven full of whipped cream. Finally, the judge decrees that since the man could not be executed, he must have been innocent. The man is released, and all five brothers live happily ever after with their mother.

== Reception and controversy ==
Though often considered a classic of children's literature, The Five Chinese Brothers has been accused of promoting ethnic stereotypes about the Chinese, particularly through its illustrations, and many teachers have removed the book from their classrooms. However, the book has had some defenders. In a 1977 School Library Journal article, Selma G. Lanes described the illustrations as "cheerful and highly appealing", characterizing Wiese's "broad cartoon style" as "well suited to the folk-tale, a genre which deals in broad truths".

Based on a 2007 online poll, the National Education Association listed the book as one of its "Teachers' Top 100 Books for Children."
