= WonderWorks =

American children's television anthology series

- Country of origin: United States

Original release
- Network: PBS
- Release: 1984 – 1993

WonderWorks is an American children's anthology television series which ran from 1984 to 1993. It was produced by the Public Broadcasting Service (PBS). Walt Disney Home Video purchased the rights to the series in 1987 and made it available on VHS and later DVD, in addition to airing some of the programs on the Disney Channel.

== Films ==
The series consisted of made-for-television films, many of which were adapted from acclaimed children's books.

Before the final season, most episodes were just under one hour, with longer films either being edited for time or split into multiple episodes.

Examples of book adaptations include Lucy Maud Montgomery's Anne of Green Gables, Bridge to Terabithia, All Summer in a Day, Jacob Have I Loved, The Box of Delights, C.S. Lewis' The Chronicles of Narnia series (co-produced by WonderWorks and the BBC), Miracle at Moreaux, The Hoboken Chicken Emergency, Odile & Yvette at the Edge of the World, How to Be a Perfect Person in Just Three Days! (by Stephen Manes), Gryphon, A Little Princess, A Girl of the Limberlost, Sweet 15, A Waltz Through the Hills, The Canterville Ghost, Frog, The Haunting of Barney Palmer, Lone Star Kid, Caddie Woodlawn, The House of Dies Drear, and The Boy Who Loved Trolls.

WonderWorks also co-produced the Australian Clowning Around series, which in 1993 was edited into a 3-hour movie for PBS (split into two parts on some stations).

== Production ==
During the airing of new productions, the series was retitled as The WonderWorks' Family Movie up until the series' ending in 1993.

The program was co-produced by numerous PBS stations, including WQED (Pittsburgh, PA), KCET (Los Angeles, CA), KTCA (St. Paul-Minneapolis, MN), WHRO (Hampton-Norfolk, VA), South Carolina Educational Television (SC), WETA (Washington, D.C.), and KERA (Dallas-Fort Worth, TX).

== Broadcast and home media ==
WonderWorks primarily aired on PBS from 1984 through 1991. From 1987 to the mid-1990s, some programs also aired on The Disney Channel.

In late 1986, WonderWorks entered into a 5-year agreement with The Disney Channel to supply content and engage in co-productions. Under the deal, some programs would first air on The Disney channel, some on PBS. The deal also gave Walt Disney Home Video the rights to release several previous WonderWorks titles and all upcoming shared programming, and it gave Disney's Buena Vista Television syndication rights over the same material.

In 1990, Public Media Video acquired the home video rights more broadly, and began releasing WonderWorks Family Movie titles on VHS starting in August of that year.

Although the series was discontinued after the 7th season in 1991, reruns continued to air on most PBS stations. Several new productions also appeared in 1992 and 1993, first being released on home video before airing as WonderWorks Family Movie presentations on PBS and Disney.

In 1996, the home video line, then at 44 titles, was acquired and reissued by Salt Lake City-based Bonneville Worldwide Entertainment, which began reissuing content at lower prices, as well as releasing new titles over at least the next two years. By 1998, there were 52 titles in the series.

In 1999, VHS rights to 55 WonderWorks specials were passed over to Canadian company CINAR Corporation (now in WildBrain), which sold the rights to Questar Entertainment sometime in the 2000s.
