= Bear Party =

1952 Caldecott picture book

- Author: William Pène du Bois
- Publisher: Viking Press
- Publication date: 1951
- Pages: unpaged
- Awards: Caldecott Honor

Bear Party is a 1951 picture book written and illustrated by William Pène du Bois. In order to stop fighting, koala bears throw a party. The book was a recipient of a 1952 Caldecott Honor for its illustrations.
