= Loretta Swit =

American actress (1937–2025)

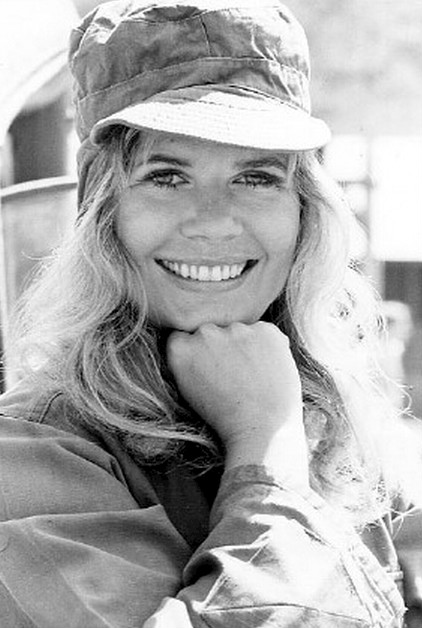
- Swit on M*A*S*H set in 1972 as Major Margaret "Hot Lips" Houlihan
- Born: Loretta Jane Szwed; November 4, 1937; Passaic, New Jersey, U.S.
- Died: May 30, 2025 (aged 87); New York City, U.S.
- Education: Katharine Gibbs College; American Academy of Dramatic Arts
- Occupation: Actress
- Years active: 1961–2019
- Known for: M*A*S*H; Pyramid
- Spouse: Dennis Holahan (m. 1983; div. 1995)

Loretta Swit (born Loretta Jane Szwed; November 4, 1937 – May 30, 2025) was an American stage and television actress. She was widely known for her character roles, especially her role as Major Margaret "Hot Lips" Houlihan on M*A*S*H, for which she was nominated for Emmy Awards in each season of the long-running show, and won two, in 1980 and 1982.

== Early life ==
Loretta Jane Szwed was born on November 4, 1937, in Passaic, New Jersey, to Nellie (née Kassack) and Lester Szwed, both of Polish descent. Her father was a salesman and upholsterer. Swit's brother, Robert, was six years and one day her senior. As a child, Swit was a member of a Girl Scout troop sponsored by the Holy Rosary R.C. Church of Passaic.

She graduated from Pope Pius XII High School in Passaic in 1955, where she had been a cheerleader, had taken part in theatrical productions, and was co-captain of the girls' basketball team. She graduated from Katharine Gibbs School in Montclair, New Jersey, in June 1957, then was employed at a variety of clerical jobs, including as a stenographer in Bloomfield, New Jersey; personal secretary to Elsa Maxwell; secretary to the ambassador from Ghana to the United Nations; and at the American Rocket Society in New York City while being trained to dance by a classmate, Elizabeth Parent-Barber, a Rockette and student at the New York School of Ballet. During this time, she began developing her acting career.

She studied drama with Gene Frankel in Manhattan and considered him her acting coach. She regularly returned to his studio to speak with aspiring actors throughout her career. Swit was also a singer, having trained at the American Academy of Dramatic Arts.

== Theatre ==
Swit's first off-Broadway appearance was in the Actors Playhouse production of An Enemy of the People. In 1961, Swit landed a role in the Circle in the Square production of The Balcony, written by Jean Genet and produced by José Quintero.

In 1967, Swit toured with the national company of Any Wednesday, starring Gardner McKay. She continued as one of the Pigeon sisters opposite Don Rickles and Ernest Borgnine in a Los Angeles run of The Odd Couple.

In 1975, Swit played in Same Time, Next Year on Broadway opposite Ted Bessell. She also performed on Broadway during the 1980s in The Mystery of Edwin Drood. From there, she played Agnes Gooch in the Las Vegas version of Mame, starring Susan Hayward and later, Celeste Holm.

She played Shirley Valentine, a one-woman play, from the 1990s into the 2010s, appearing in a variety of locales and revivals.

In October to November 2003, she starred as the title character in North Carolina Theatre's production of Mame in Raleigh, North Carolina.

In August to September 2010, Swit starred in the world premiere of the Mark Miller play Amorous Crossing at the Alhambra Dinner Theatre in Jacksonville, Florida, directed by Tod Booth.

In 2016, Swit appeared in Six Dance Lessons in Six Weeks at Totem Pole Playhouse in Fayetteville, Pennsylvania and again, in 2017, in Buffalo, New York.

== Television ==
When Swit arrived in Hollywood in 1969, she performed guest roles in various television series, including Hawaii Five-O (her first TV credit), Gunsmoke, Mission: Impossible, and Mannix.

=== M*A*S*H ===
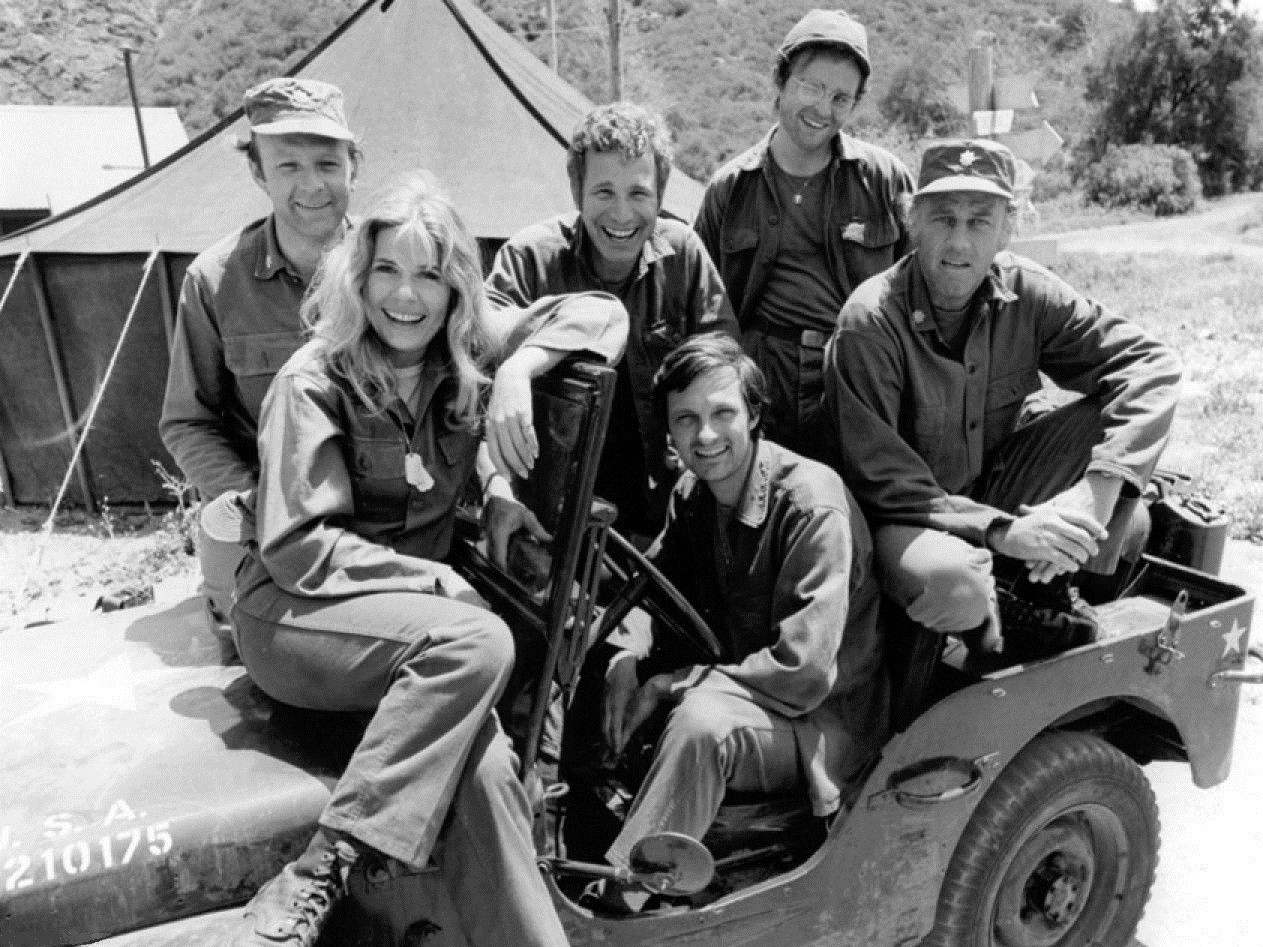
The cast of M*A*S*H (1974); clockwise from left: Larry Linville, Swit, Wayne Rogers, Gary Burghoff, McLean Stevenson, and Alan Alda

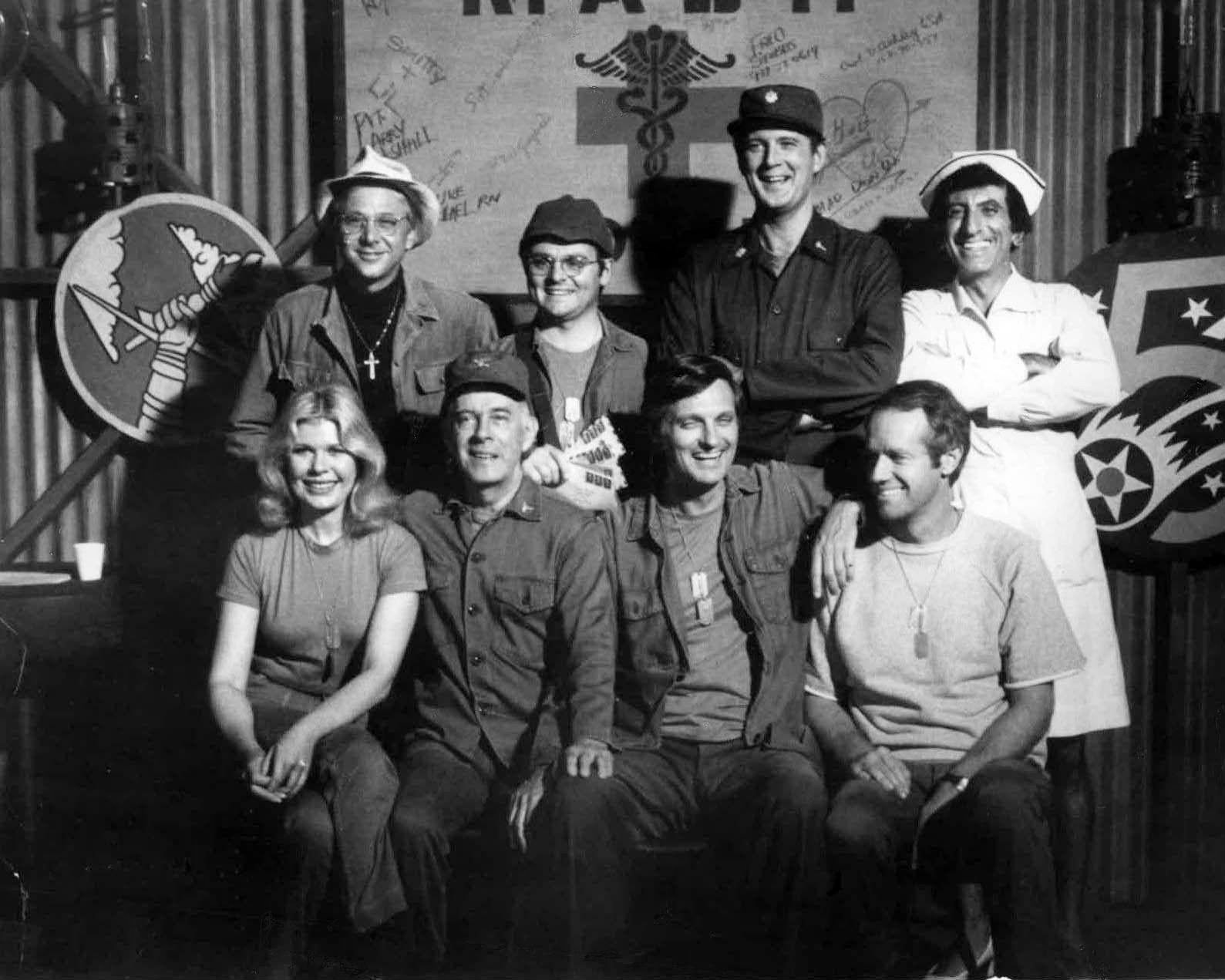
The cast of M*A*S*H (1977); back row, L-R: William Christopher, Gary Burghoff, David Ogden Stiers, and Jamie Farr, front: Swit, Harry Morgan, Alan Alda, and Mike Farrell

Starting in 1972, Swit played the extremely capable head nurse Major Margaret "Hot Lips" Houlihan in the television series M*A*S*H, a comedy set in a U.S. Mobile Army Surgical Hospital during the Korean War. Swit inherited the star-making role from actress Sally Kellerman, who had portrayed Houlihan in the feature film. In the first few seasons, her character was single and patriotic, and she had no friends among the camp surgeons and nurses, with the notable exception of her married lover, Major Frank Burns, portrayed by Larry Linville. Over time, her character was considerably softened. She married a lieutenant colonel, but divorced soon after. She became good friends with her fellow officers, and her attitude towards the Koreans in and around the camp became more enlightened. The change reflected that of the series in general, from absurdist dark humor to mature comedy-drama. Swit was one of only four cast members to stay for all 11 seasons of the show, from 1972 to 1983 (the others were Alan Alda, Jamie Farr, and William Christopher).

Swit and Alda were the only actors to have been in both the pilot episode and the finale; she appeared in all but 11 of the 256 episodes. Swit received two Emmy Awards for her work on M*A*S*H.

Her favorite episodes were "Hot Lips and Empty Arms", "Margaret's Engagement", and "The Nurses".

She also had a close relationship with Harry Morgan, who played Colonel Sherman T. Potter. They became neighbors after the series ended, until his death on December 7, 2011. Swit remained close to Alda, along with his wife, three daughters, and seven grandchildren.

=== Cagney and Lacey ===
In 1981, Swit played the role of Christine Cagney in the movie pilot for the television series Cagney & Lacey, but was precluded by contractual obligations from continuing the role. Meg Foster portrayed Cagney for the first six episodes of the television series, then Sharon Gless took over the role.

=== Other TV work ===
Swit also guest-starred in television shows, including The Muppet Show, Bonanza, The Love Boat, and Gunsmoke. She also appeared as a celebrity guest on game shows, including Match Game, Pyramid, Win, Lose or Draw, Password, and Hollywood Squares. Additionally, she starred in Christmas programs such as the television version of The Best Christmas Pageant Ever and 1987's PBS special A Christmas Calendar. In 1988, she hosted Korean War—The Untold Story, a documentary on the true events of the war, and went to South Korea to film it, becoming the first M*A*S*H cast member to actually visit the country since Jamie Farr's service there in the mid-1950s while a member of the U.S. Army. In 1992, she hosted the 26-part series Those Incredible Animals on the Discovery Channel. Swit's last appearance was on GSN Live on October 10, 2008.

She was also in the TV movie The Last Day (1975), with Richard Widmark and Robert Conrad.

Swit guest-starred with Mike Connors in Mannix, episode 78, season four, "Figures in a Landscape", written by Paul Krasny and directed by Donn Mullally, originally airing on October 10, 1970. Swit guest-starred as Wanda Russell in the Hawaii Five-O episode titled "Three Dead Cows at Makapuu", which aired February 25, 1970. She also starred in the Hawaii Five-O episode "Bait Once, Bait Twice", on January 4, 1972.

== Personal life and death ==
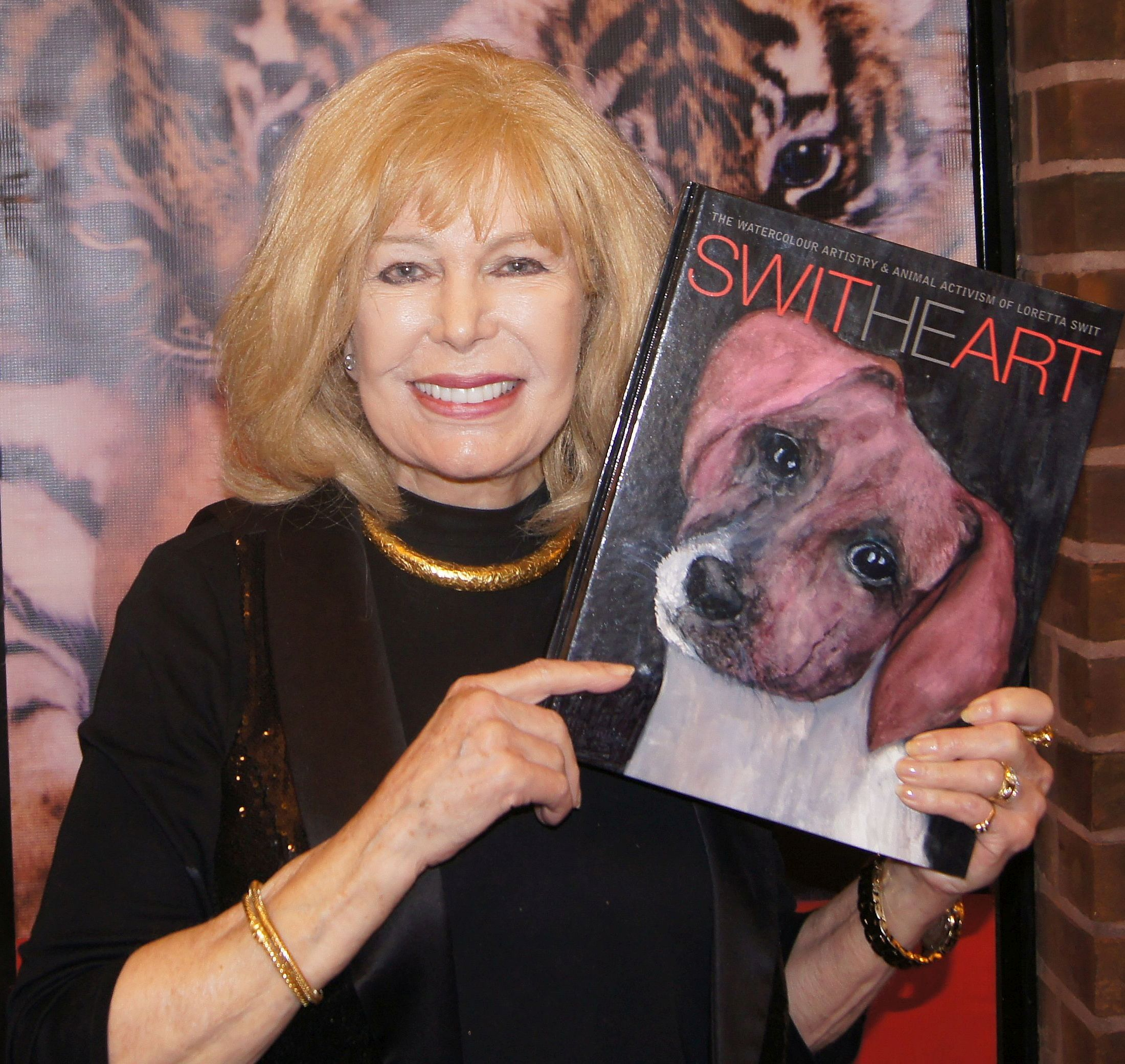
Swit with her book, 2019

Swit was once linked with musician Bill Hudson. She married actor Dennis Holahan in 1983 and divorced him in 1995. Holahan played Per Johannsen, a Swedish diplomat who became briefly involved with Swit's character in an episode of M*A*S*H.

Swit was an animal rights activist. She was a vegetarian for many years before becoming a vegan in 1981.

Swit wrote a book on needlepoint, titled A Needlepoint Scrapbook.

Swit died from natural causes at her home in New York City, on May 30, 2025, at the age of 87.

== Filmography ==
=== Film ===
Loretta Swit film credits
Year	Title	Role	Notes
1972	Stand Up and Be Counted	Hilary McBride	
1973	Deadhead Miles	Lady With Glass Eye	
1974	Policewomen	Police clerk	Uncredited
1974	Freebie and the Bean	Mildred Meyers, Red's Wife	
1975	Race with the Devil	Alice	
1981	S.O.B.	Polly Reed	
1985	Beer	B.D. Tucker	
1986	Whoops Apocalypse	President Barbara Adams	
1996	Forest Warrior	Shirley	
1998	Beach Movie	Mrs. Jones	
2019	Play the Flute	Mrs. Kincaid	

=== Television ===
Loretta Swit television credits
Year	Title	Role	Notes
1970–1972	Hawaii Five-O	Anna Schreuder / Wanda Russell / Betty	4 episodes
1970	Mission: Impossible	Midge Larson	Episode: "Homecoming"
1970	Mannix	Dorothy Harker / Jill Packard	Episodes: "Only One Death to a Customer" (Season 3-Episode 20), "Figures in a Landscape" (Season 4-Episode 04)
1970	Gunsmoke	Belle Clark / Donna	Episodes: "The Pack Rat", "Snow Train" (Parts 1 & 2)
1971	Cade's County	Ginny Lomax	Episode: "Homecoming"
1971	The Bold Ones: The New Doctors	Rosalyn	Episode: "The Convicts"
1972	Fireball Forward	Nurse (uncredited)	TV movie
1972	Bonanza	Ellen Sue Greely	Episode: "A Visit to Upright"
1972	Young Dr. Kildare	Alice	Episode: "The Nature of the Beast"
1972–1983	M*A*S*H	Major Margaret "Hot Lips" Houlihan	Main cast Primetime Emmy Award for Outstanding Supporting Actress in a Comedy Series (1980, 1982); People's Choice Award for Favorite Female TV Performer (1983); Nominated – Primetime Emmy Award for Outstanding Supporting Actress in a Comedy Series (1974–79, 1981, 1983); Nominated – Golden Globe Award for Best Actress – Television Series Musical or Comedy (1980, 1982); Nominated – Golden Globe Award for Best Supporting Actress – Series, Miniseries or Television Film (1974, 1983)
1972	Love, American Style	Doris	Segment "Love and the Pick-Up Fantasy"
1973	Ironside	Sally Pearson	Episode: "Ollinger's Last Case"
1973	Match Game	Herself	Game Show Participant / Celebrity Guest Star
1973	Shirts/Skins	Linda Bush	TV movie
1973	Love, American Style	Mary Beth Scoggins	Segment "Love and the Locksmith"
1973–1979	Pyramid	Herself	90 episodes
1973–1979	Match Game	Herself	51 episodes
1973–1979	The Mike Douglas Show	Herself	6 episodes
1974	Petrocelli	Ella Knox	Episode: "By Reason of Madness"
1974	The Merv Griffin Show	Herself	1 episode
1975	The Last Day	Daisy	TV movie
1975	It's a Bird... It's a Plane... It's Superman	Sydney	TV movie
1975	Rickles	Major Margaret "Hot Lips" Houlihan	TV special
1975	The Bobby Vinton Show	Herself	1 episode
1975	Celebrity Bowling	Herself	2 episodes
1976	Good Heavens	Maxine	Episode: "Good Neighbor Maxine"
1977	The Hostage Heart	Chris LeBlanc	TV movie
1977–1978	The Love Boat	Terry Larsen / Anoushka Mishancov	2 episodes
1979	Supertrain	Alice Phillips	Episode: "Hail to the Chief"
1979	Mirror, Mirror	Sandy McLaren	TV movie
1979	Friendships, Secrets and Lies	B.J.	TV movie
1979	Valentine	Emily	TV movie
1979–1980	Password Plus	Herself	Game Show Contestant / Celebrity Guest Star (4 episodes)
1980	The Muppet Show	Herself	1 episode
1980	The Love Tapes	Samantha Young	TV movie
1981	Cagney & Lacey	Detective Christine Cagney	TV movie
1982	The Kid from Nowhere	Caroline Baker	TV movie
1982	Games Mother Never Taught You	Laura Bentells	TV movie
1983	First Affair	Jane Simon	TV movie
1983	The Best Christmas Pageant Ever	Grace Bradley	TV movie
1984	The Love Boat	Kathy Ross	Episode: "My Mother, My Chaperone/The Present/The Death and Life of Sir Albert Demerest/Welcome Aboard"
1985	The Execution	Marysia Walenka	TV movie
1985	Sam	Samantha Flynn	TV pilot episode
1985	Miracle at Moreaux	Sister Gabrielle	TV movie
1986	Dreams of Gold: The Mel Fisher Story	Deo Fisher	TV movie
1987	A Christmas Calendar	Herself (Host)	TV special
1988	14 Going on 30	Miss Louisa Horton	TV movie
1988	Dolly	LuWanda Novack	Episode: "#1.19"
1989	ABC Afterschool Special	Wanda Karpinsky	Episode: "My Dad Can't Be Crazy... Can He?"
1990	A Matter of Principle	Jane Short	TV movie
1991	Hell Hath No Fury	Connie Stewart	TV movie
1991	Memories of M*A*S*H	Herself / Major Margaret "Hot Lips" Houlihan	TV special
1992	Batman: The Animated Series	Marcia Cates (voice)	Episode: "Mad as a Hatter"
1992	A Killer Among Friends	Detective Patricia Staley	TV movie
1992	The Big Battalions	Cora Lynne	TV miniseries
1994	Murder, She Wrote	Kim Mitchell	Episode: "Portrait of Death"
1995	Burke's Law	Evelyn Turner	Episode: "Who Killed the Sweet Smell of Success?"
1997	Cow and Chicken	Judge (voice)	Episode: "Space Cow/The Legend of Sailcat"
1998	Diagnosis: Murder	Maggie Dennings	Episode: "Drill for Death"
1999–2004	Hollywood Squares	Herself	6 episodes
2002	M*A*S*H: 30th Anniversary Reunion	Herself / Major Margaret "Hot Lips" Houlihan	TV special

== Awards and honors ==
- In 1991, she won the Sarah Siddons Award for her work in Chicago theater.
- Swit received a star on the Hollywood Walk of Fame in 1989.

== Published works ==
- Swit, Loretta (1986). A Needlepoint Scrapbook. Doubleday. ISBN 978-0-38-519905-6.
- Swit, Loretta (2017). SwitHeart: The Watercolour Artistry & Animal Activism of Loretta Swit. Ultimate Symbol. ISBN 978-0-97-695139-1.
