= Call Me Bandicoot =

1970 novel by William Pène du Bois

- First edition (publ. Harper & Row)
- Author: William Pène du Bois
- Language: English
- Publisher: Harper & Row
- Publication date: 1970
- LC Class: PZ7.D8527 Cal

Call Me Bandicoot is a 1970 young adult novel written by U.S. author William Pène du Bois. The novel takes place on the Staten Island Ferry and focuses on the relationship between an adult passenger and a young man who spins tall tales in exchange for food.
