= Carles Fontserè =

Catalan poster illustrator, photographer and set designer

- Born: Carles Fontserè i Carrió; March 9, 1916; Barcelona
- Died: January 4, 2007
- Occupation: poster illustrator

Carles Fontserè i Carrió (Barcelona, March 9, 1916 – Girona, January 4, 2007) was a prominent Catalan poster illustrator, especially known for his works during the Second Spanish Republic and Spanish Civil War. He also worked as a photographer and set designer.

He was born in Barcelona in 1916. During the Civil War he was a soldier of the International Brigades and distinguished as a poster artist. He experienced World War II and the immediate post-war years in France. In 1948 he travelled to Mexico; there he produced, together with Mario Moreno, a magazine show, of which he was the costume designer and the set designer. In 1950 he moved to New York, where he stayed until 1973, when he returned to Spain.

He has worked as an illustrator, comic book artist, set designer, poster artist, painter and photographer. He has done various publishing projects and was the artistic director of the Spanish-American magazine Temas.

He spent the last years of his life he in Porqueres, Girona, where he wrote his memoirs and in 2007 he died at the age of 90.
