= A Christmas Calendar =

1987 holiday TV special

- Opening card for program
- Written by: Hildegarde Schroeder
- Directed by: Jochen Richter
- Presented by: Loretta Swit
- Country of origin: United States
- Original languages: English; German

Production
- Producer: Franz Lazi
- Running time: 60 minutes
- Production company: Deutsche Welle

Original release
- Network: PBS
- Release: December 18, 1987

A Christmas Calendar is a 1987 American Christmas television special hosted and narrated by Loretta Swit. The program was co-produced for PBS by Deutsche Welle and Oregon Public Broadcasting and premiered December 18, 1987 on PBS.

== Description ==
Loretta Swit travels to Germany to discover the holiday traditions in the European country. Swit journeys through various regions of Germany including spending some of the holiday with a German family. She discovers the origins of St Nicholas, the Christmas traditions such as the Christkindlmarkt as well as show the viewers the winter scenery of the country. The program includes seasonal music with insight of the origins of the titles.

== Cast ==
- Loretta Swit
- Reinhardt Schmidt
- Theresia Schmidt
- Felicia Sharon
- Barry Sharon
- Regensburger Domspatzen
- Fischer Choir of Stuttgart

== Production ==
Location scenes for the program included Nuremberg, Munich, Aachen, Stuttgart, Hamburg, and Berlin, Germany. The program has not been released on VHS or DVD.

== See also ==
- Loretta Swit
