= All Alone (novel) =

1953 novel by Claire Huchet Bishop

- First edition cover
- Author: Claire Huchet Bishop
- Illustrators: Feodor Rojankovsky
- Publisher: Scholastic
- Publication date: January 1, 1953
- ISBN: 9780590457071

All Alone is a children's book by Claire Huchet Bishop, published by Viking Press with illustrations by Feodor Rojankovsky in 1953. It was a runner-up for the annual Newbery Medal from the American Library Association, which recognizes the year's most distinguished contribution to American literature for children.

== Plot ==
Marcel Mabout is a "ten-year-old man", sent by his father with their three cows to summer pasture in the French mountains. While he is being trusted with the "family fortune" for the first time, Marcel is even more entrusted with the family creed, which also permeates his village, "Mind your own business". It is a village of friendless strangers, not neighbours. In the mountains, Marcel faces the cold, fear, and loneliness he was not prepared for. But when he hears the yodels of Pierre Pascal, a slightly older cowherd boy in the mountains, and their yodeling consoles each other. Then Pierre's cows wander over to Marcel's mountain, and he is faced with a crisis of conscience that pits his antisocial upbringing with his inner sense of righteousness. Deciding to take the risk of returning Pierre's cows, Marcel sets off a chain of events that leads to a revolution in the village.
