= Leisure horses =

Equestrianism for pleasure

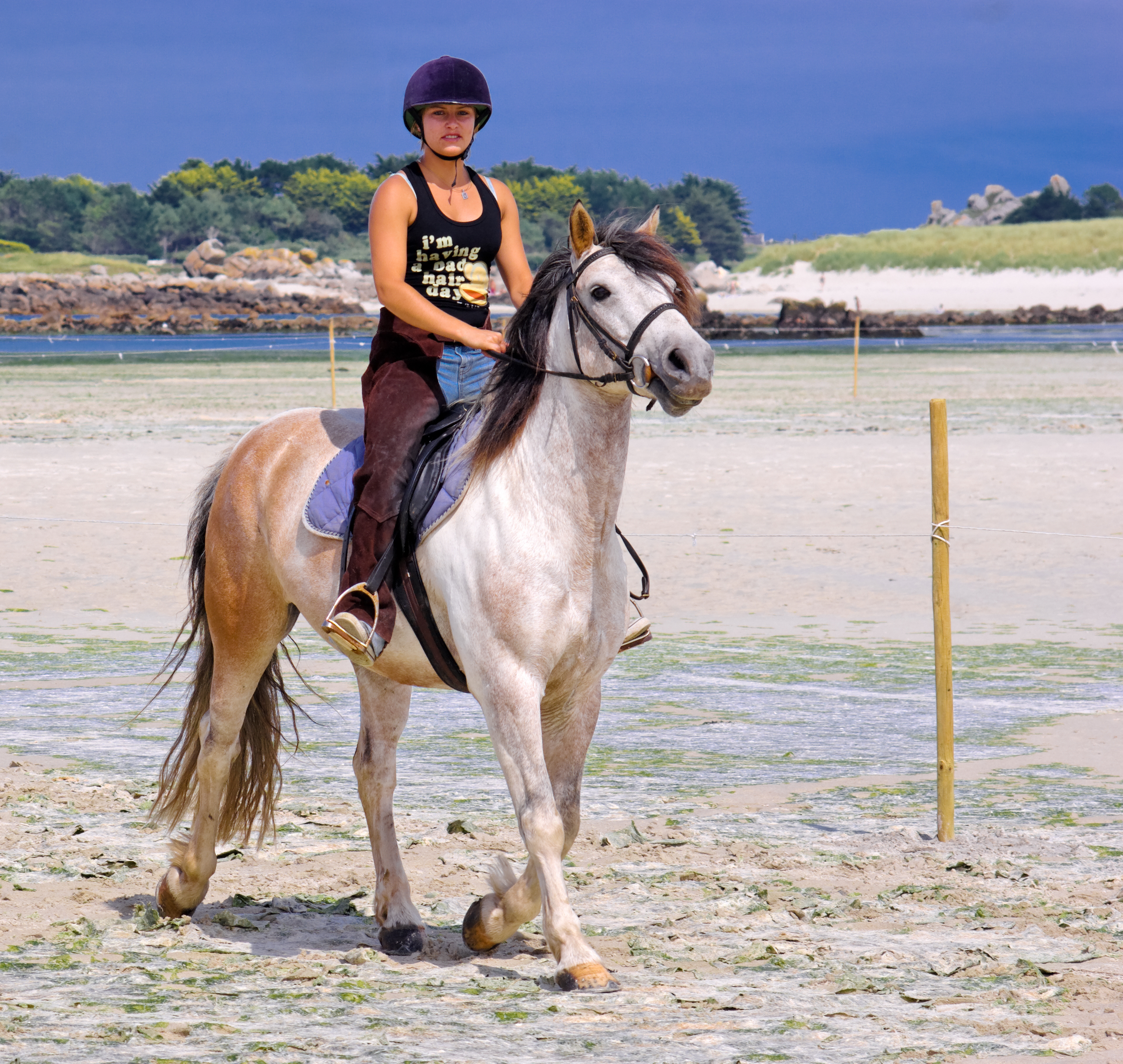
Leisure rider riding on a beach in Brittany

Leisure horses are intended for pleasure riding, and in particular for trail riding by private individuals. Difficult to define, it is above all an animal endowed with particular qualities, rather than a precise breed. It must be versatile and calm in character, with a willing and courageous mind. As early as the 1970s, breeders such as those of the Swiss Freiberger were breeding animals for this then-new use. The market for leisure horses is now buoyant. France has created "leisure qualifications" for this purpose.

Raising such a horse often involves reducing sensitivity to external stimuli and early handling of foals. Horses retired from horseracing can also be re-educated for leisure. Leisure horses are now an important part of the equestrian landscape in Western countries, particularly in the USA, Canada, Belgium, Switzerland and France, where they accounted for almost two-thirds of all horses registered in 2015.

== Definition ==
The notion of a leisure horse is difficult to define. According to various sources (including Carlos Henriques Pereira), it is a horse defined by its adaptation to all forms of equestrian leisure, rather than by a particular breed or type, as can be the case for sport and stock horses. As such, leisure horses can be highly varied in terms of breed and morphology.

=== Mental and physical qualities ===
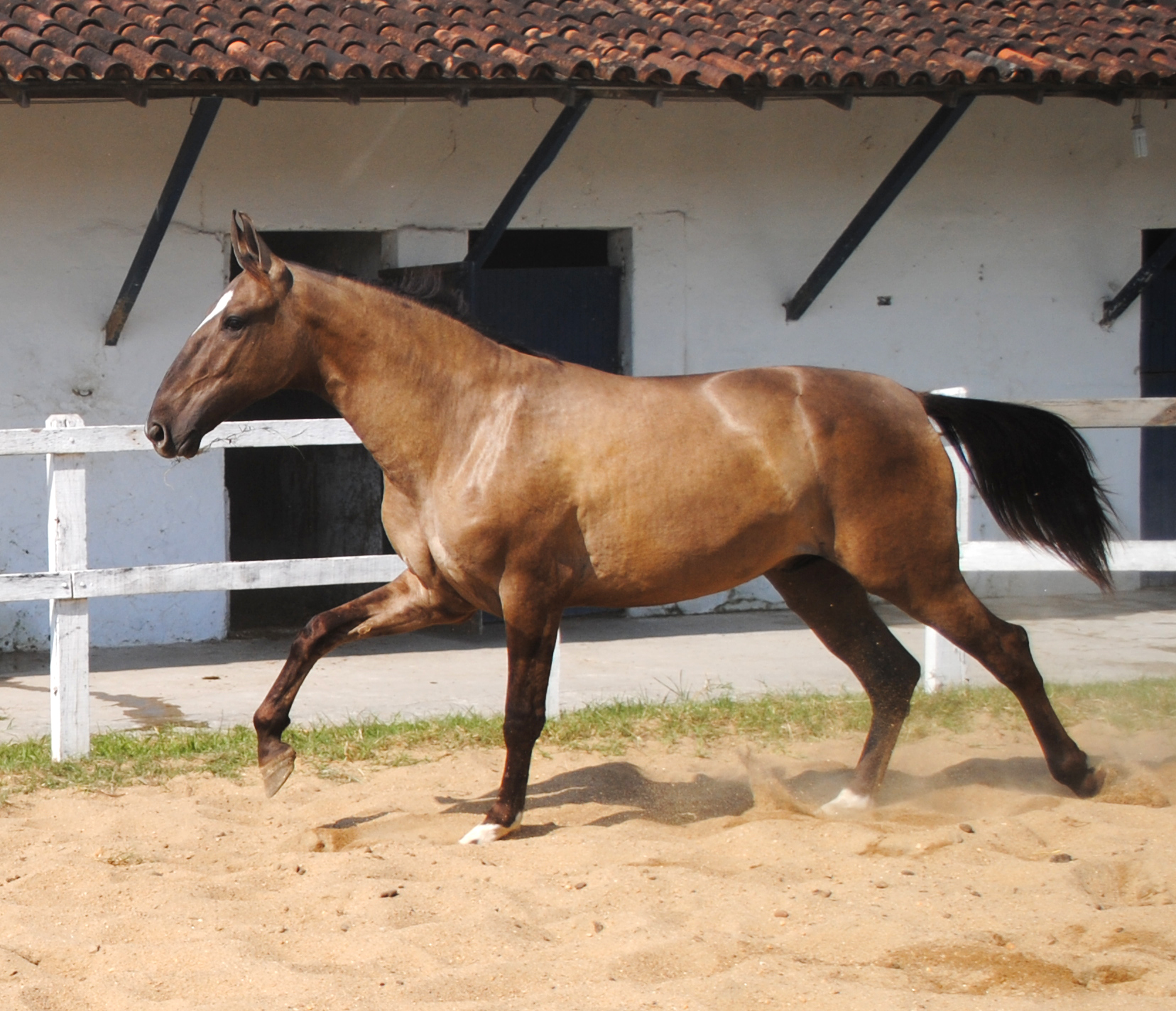
A Campolina horse, a breed widely used for leisure in Brazil

The main criteria for a good leisure horse are a supple, easy-going character, sociability, and the ability to support beginners in horseback riding. The versatility and character of a leisure horse can also be acquired through appropriate training and work. In 2015, the award of a label for pleasure riding in France made it possible to define the qualities required in these horses: a willing and courageous mind, an unemotional character, limbs and hooves of excellent quality, a rather modest size to make it easier to get on and off the saddle and great versatility, unlike sport horses which specialize in a single equestrian discipline.

=== Breeds ===
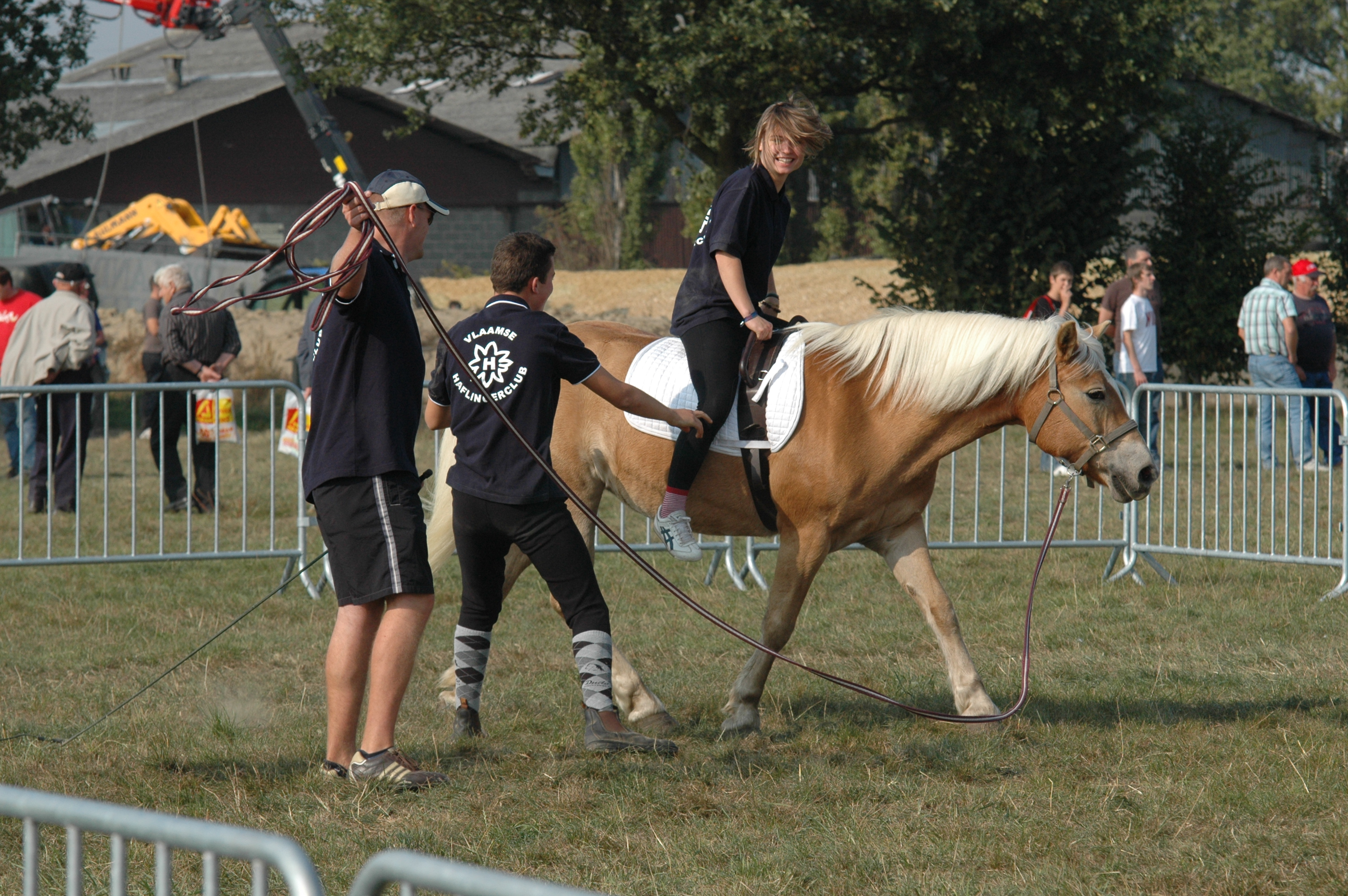
The Haflinger generally makes an excellent leisure horse

Although there are a large number of horses with no pedigree (grade horses) among leisure riders, certain breeds are a better fit for leisure riding, such as the Haflinger, the Fjord horse, the Camargue and the Mérens, breeds renowned for their hardiness and modest size. In the United States, we find the Appaloosa, Quarter Horse, Tennessee Walker and Arabian breeds. For children, it's the American Shetland and the Pony of the Americas. In France, racehorses of the French Trotter and Thoroughbred breeds can be converted into leisure horses by dedicated organizations or experienced riders. The same phenomenon can be found in the United States, where many pleasure horses are Thoroughbreds and Standardbreds.

Some breeds have specific qualities. Arabians and Barbs, for example, are renowned for their stamina, while Franches-Montagnes and Hensons are known for their temperament. Some draft horse breeders (particularly in France) also select their animals for leisure purposes, giving them the appropriate qualifications, as is the case with the Breton.

== History ==
In Antiquity and the Middle Ages, the horse may have been used as a de facto leisure animal, but generally on a small scale and by a wealthy social class, without being defined as such. The legal notion of "leisure horse" was introduced on March 27, 1888. A Scottish man asked the British parliament for an exact definition of a pleasure horse, since it was suggested that owners of this type of horse should be taxed. He was told that a horse kept as a "luxury item", not for commercial use but for "what we call leisure", met the definition of a pleasure horse. However, some horses can be used for more than one activity. The same type of question, that of the "legendary and clerical beast of Flanders: the mixed horse", arose in Belgium in 1878, when Flemish peasants, supporters of the Catholic party, used their draft horses for Sunday rides to pay a tax enabling them to vote, in a country where censal suffrage existed. In 1964, in the Canadian Parliament, the same issues were raised with a view to differentiating between draft and leisure horses, particularly when the same horse was used for both activities.

The idea of the leisure horse has been codified much more recently. Particularly in France, it has accompanied the expansion of outdoor equitation. The idea was raised as early as 1988, and put into practice in 1993. The "leisure qualifications" were created to assess the qualities of horses intended for leisure purposes, and to enable buyers to better orient themselves within an abundant offer. Over the years, the system has met with a positive response. The creation of the "riding horse" register in 1994 was intended to create a breeding ground for leisure horses, but few people actually use the leisure qualifications: in 2000, only around a thousand horses passed them. In Switzerland, the Franches-Montagnes breed has been selected specifically for equestrian leisure since the 1970s, thanks to very selective behavioral tests, making it highly valued.

The development of pleasure riding in Western countries is also recent (early 1990s), and studies are still lacking (2011), despite the widely observed multiplication of "leisure horse" purchases. The term "hobby breeding" did not exist in academic publications in 1997, yet in the two townships of Ganges and Saint-Martin-de-Londres alone, horses accounted for 72% of the 138 leisure animal farms surveyed that year. This growth in the leisure horse market has been accompanied by an increase in the number of amateur riders who, depending on the region, owned between 45% and 85% of leisure horses in France in 2011. It is also helping to transform the territories and skills required, for example by equine veterinarians, who need to adapt to this new clientele.

== Horse training and care ==
Different breeders talk about how to educate and train a leisure horse. Genetics play a role: horses from cold-blooded parents are more likely to be predisposed to leisure work. Similarly, life in the field is recommended for more balanced horses. Breeders handle foals extensively from an early age, haltering them, and picking up their hooves, to obtain horses that are closer to humans. Some breeders train their leisure horses in natural horsemanship techniques. Serious breeders also train their horses to be less sensitive to the environment. Horses retired from racing often have to undergo specific training for leisure riding, as most of them are not adapted to it.

In addition to their diet, leisure horses require specific care to ensure their well-being. Equine vets generally identify three types of cases in the treatment of these horses. Sport and leisure riders tend to medicalize their horses and seek specific advice from professionals. Trail riders are more independent and tend to look after their horses themselves, with varying levels of satisfaction. Owners of "companion horses", who do not ride them, are often the most ignorant of their animals' needs. From a veterinary point of view, they are similar to "canine clients".

== Economic aspects ==
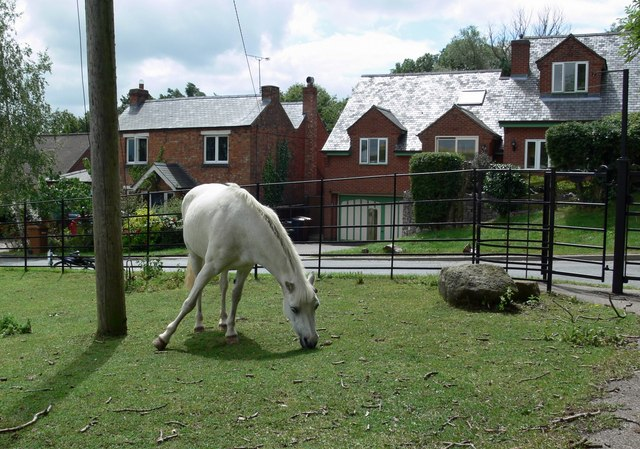
Interest in horses for leisure purposes is probably contributing to the phenomenon of peri-urbanization

According to a prospective study carried out by INRA in 2012, the leisure horse market is booming and will become increasingly profitable (particularly in France) if enough people have the financial means to acquire this type of animal. However, the economic crisis that has hit the eurozone has led to fierce competition between leisure horse breeders. In France, since the increase in VAT, these animals are sold at higher prices than in other European countries such as Ireland, Germany and the Iberian Peninsula, despite a drop in the average selling price from €2,700 to €2,400 in 2014. An important aspect of leisure horse activities is that they consume a lot of space in rural areas. The horses themselves occupy a territory for their breeding, grazing and working areas, to which must be added the space given over to the paths used by riders.

Leisure horse owners generally have very few animals (fewer than five in the USA) and do not practice responsible breeding. A significant proportion breed a favorite horse for sentimental reasons. When it comes to maintaining leisure horses, there are two types of owners: those who delegate to professionals (such as equestrian centers), and those who keep their horses at home. They are generally motivated by the need to minimize transaction costs: owners of a single leisure horse often place their horse in a professional facility, but try to keep them at home as soon as they have two or more. Some owners aim to maintain a special relationship with one or more of their horses, and therefore keep them at home, although this requires more skill and time. This solution is only possible for horse owners living in rural areas. The desire to participate in non-competitive equestrian sports is also a factor, as sports facilities are generally only available in professional establishments. Independent owners are usually people of modest incomes, with land and equestrian skills, who attach little importance to having freedom of movement. The hypothesis that interest in leisure horses contributes to the development of a peri-urbanization phenomenon is plausible.

The average monthly cost of keeping a leisure horse in France in 2011 was estimated at over €300 in a professional facility, compared with less than €150 at home. However, this cost does not take into account all expenses: including feed, routine care and farriery, the cost of maintaining a leisure horse in a professional facility is over €5,000 per year.

== Usage ==
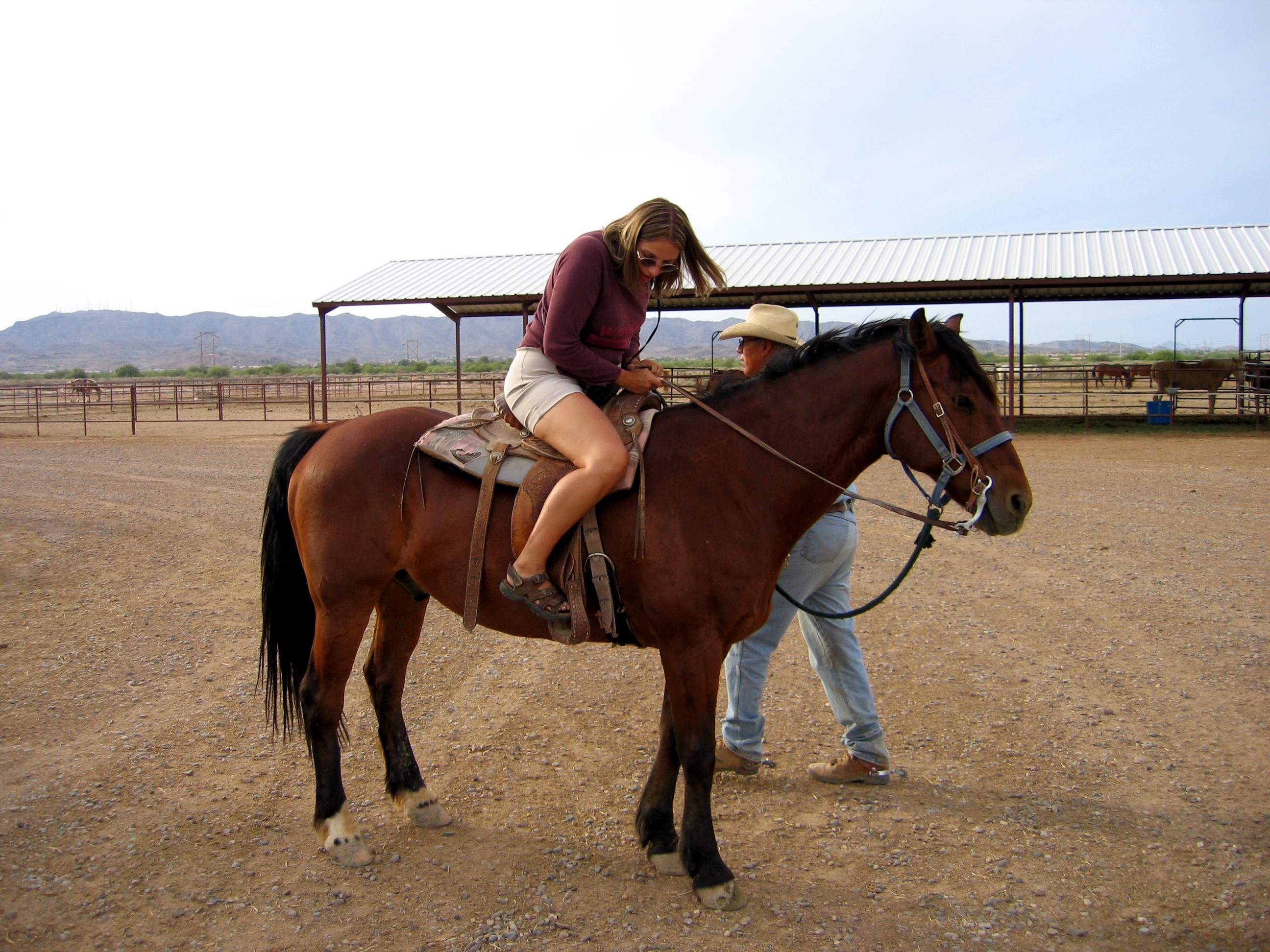
Woman riding a leisure horse on a ranch in the United States

A leisure horse can be put to a broad range of uses, depending on the rider's wishes. This includes trail riding and "strolling" most of the time, with the vast majority of leisure riders wishing for a riding horse that can be ridden over a variety of terrains. However, pleasure riders may also wish to try out other equestrian disciplines such as dressage or polo. Riders often teach circus tricks or simple dressage to leisure horses.

Like any horse, a leisure horse can theoretically be slaughtered for the horse-eating market by its owner. In France, however, a growing number of leisure horse owners are refusing this option, in particular by campaigning for the horse to be recognized as a pet rather than a livestock animal. In Switzerland, horse owners have a definitive choice in the legal status of their animal, depending on their activity, with leisure horses excluded from the food chain. Around 66% of young sport and leisure horses (aged 2 to 7) are slaughtered because their behavior is unsuited to their intended activity.

== Statistics ==
A survey carried out in the United States in 2003 revealed that 43% of horse owners own horses for leisure. In May 2015 in France, 64% of registered horses are leisure horses, and half of these are used solely for trail riding. Farms specializing in leisure horses are in the minority, however, with only 15% breeding such animals. A large proportion of declared leisure horses (60,000) are in fact racehorses that have been retired and rehabilitated for use as leisure horses. The same statistic is found in the United States.

== See also ==
- Pleasure riding
- Trail riding

== Bibliography ==
- Chauvin, Maylis (2015). Cheval de loisir : inné ou acquis ? (in French). Cheval Magazine.
- Herlin, Christine-Emmanuelle (2000). Cheval de loisir: mode d'emploi (in French). Larivière. ISBN 9782907051361.
- Lee, Hollis (1978). The pleasure horse. Country home & small farm guides. Countryside Books.
- Roche, Bénédicte; Labouesse, François; Moulin, Charles-Henri; Dimanche, Marc (1997). Un phénomène mal connu : les élevages de loisirs autour des villes (in French). Le Courrier de l'environnement.
- Vial, Céline; Aubert, Magali; Perrier-Cornet, Philippe (2011a). "Les choix organisationnels des propriétaires de chevaux de loisir dans les espaces ruraux". Économie rurale (in French) (321): 42–57. doi:10.4000/economierurale.2911.
- Vial, Céline; Aubert, Magali; Perrier-Cornet, Philippe (2011b). "Le développement de l'équitation de loisir dans les territoires ruraux : entre influences sectorielles et périurbanisation". Revue d'Économie Régionale & Urbaine. juin (3): 549–573. doi:10.3917/reru.113.0549.
