= Horses in Denmark =

Equines in Denmark

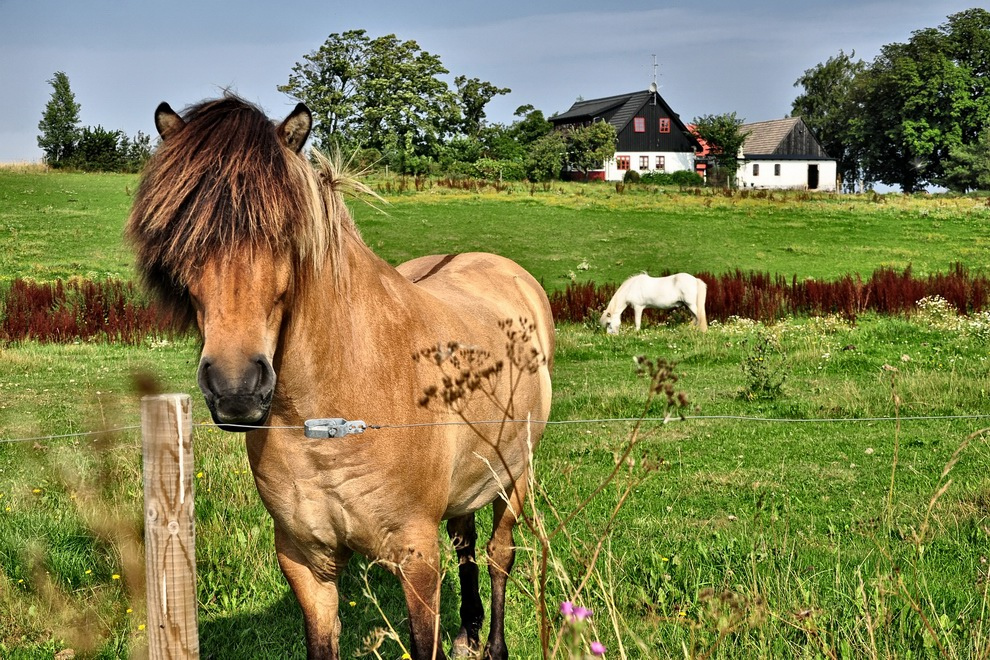
Danish ponies grazing on Bornholm island

Pony breeds and saddle and sport horses are the main horse breeds in Denmark.

Through imports and the establishment of dedicated racecourses, the development of trotting is reflected in the breeding of the Danish trotter.

Most of the Danish horses are to be found on the Jutland peninsula, especially the local draft horse breed (Jutland horse).

== History ==
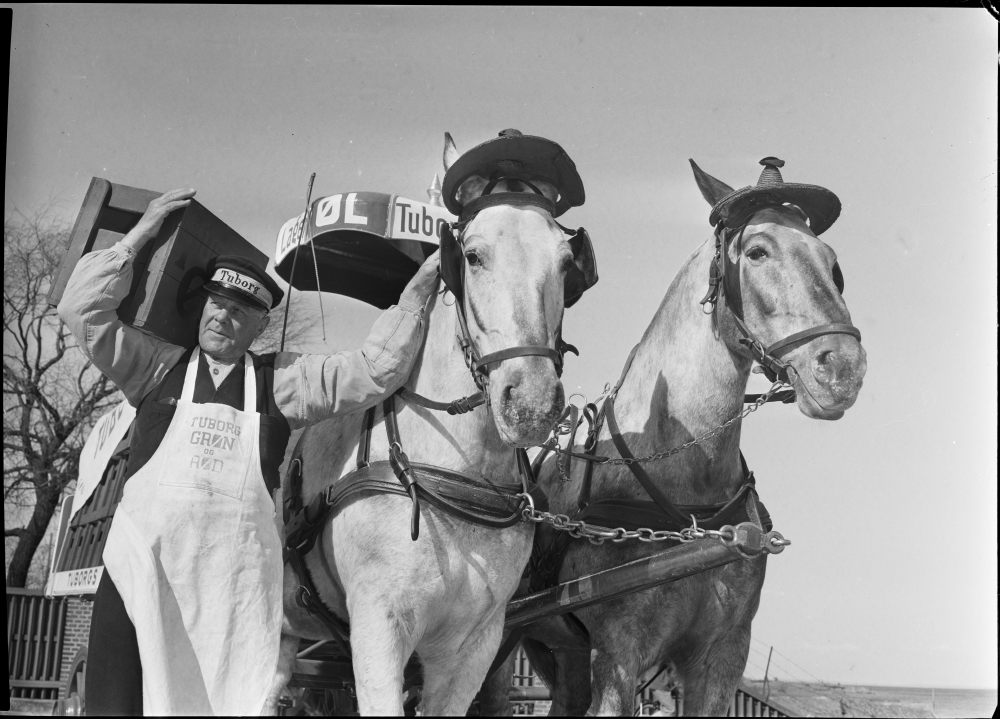
Beer delivery by horse-drawn carriage in the 20th century

According to Eugène Tisserand (1865), Danish horses have always had an excellent reputation for their beauty, docility, and strength:

- King Christian V's grand equerry rode a purebred Danish horse from Copenhagen to Frederiksberg (about 34 km) in less than 45 minutes, winning a bet of 3,000 francs with the English ambassador.
- In 1771, a Jutland horse ran 3,800 m in 4 minutes, winning a bet with another Englishman for its master, the Count of Rantzau.
  - Around the same time, a fifteen-year-old horse, bought at the age of ten for 30 francs, circled the Copenhagen racecourse (11,300 m) three times in 11 minutes (over 1 kilometer per minute).
- In 1833, in Viborg, a Danish mare weighing 85 kg, with no previous training, covered the equivalent of 2 Danish miles (15 km) in 32 minutes and 22 seconds on an uneven, hilly, and sometimes sandy track.
- Tisserand also cites 2 Jutland mares who, hitched to a 600-kilogram carriage, managed a 7.5-kilometer run in 24 minutes and 30 seconds, and who, at the end of the day, ran 15.5 miles (116 kilometers) back to their stables without showing any significant fatigue.

According to J. Jensen:

- In 1900, the province of Jutland alone had 230,000 horses, all of the local breed.
- In 2000, Denmark had about 150,000 horses, a high rate of 28.3 horses per 1,000 inhabitants.
- Since 2008, the Danes have been lobbying equine professionals to improve the housing, transportation, and medication of horses, resulting in a law that was updated in 2016.

== Uses and practices ==
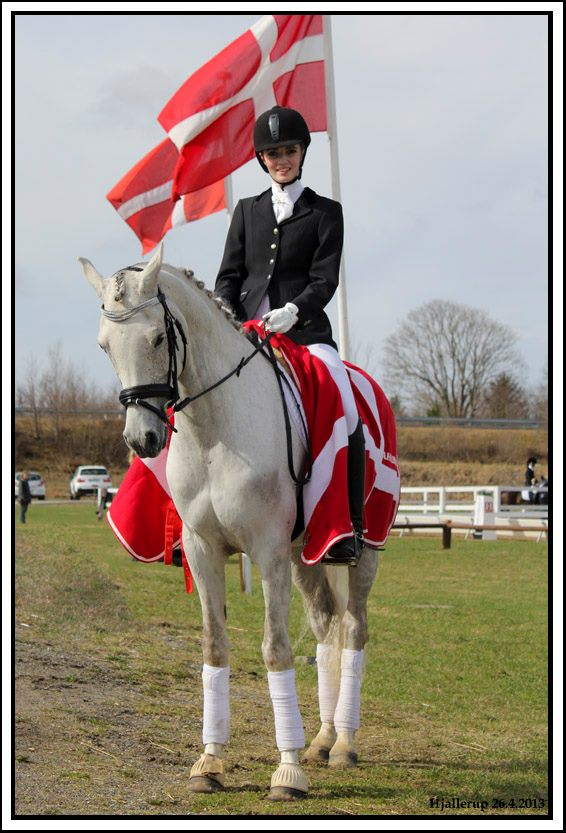
An arabian horse

The Danish equestrian sector represents a turnover of 1.1 billion euros (in 2017) and creates 20,849 full-time equivalent jobs, according to the 2010 Hestesektoren Report. Taxation is very high, with a VAT rate of 25%, with no exemption for equestrian activities.

The Danish Riding Federation (DRF) is one of the leading sports federations in the country. Denmark has a central database managed by SEGES, part of Landbrug & Fødevarer F.m.b.A (Ministry of Agriculture), which registers and publishes the papers of horses belonging to Denmark's 24 recognized breed associations. It shares its data with the DRF and veterinarians, making it possible, among other things, to calculate genetic indices.

Dansk Hestevaeddelob administers trotting races. Denmark is relatively active in this sector with eight dedicated racecourses, although it is in recession.

Dansk Galop manages Galop racing. This sector is very small, with the 96 purebred foals offered for sale in Hørsholm in 2015 representing a turnover of approximately 958,000 euros.

== Breeding ==
- In 2008, there were approximately 150,000 horses in Denmark. A rate of 27.6 horses per 1,000 inhabitants, which is one of the highest rates in the European Union.
- The 2014 Dansk Landbrugsrådgivning census shows a herd of 175,000 horses in the possession of 78,000 people. Most of them live in rural areas, and 60% of these owners live on the Jutland peninsula alone.
- About 100,000 hectares of Danish land are used for equestrian activities, including 93,000 hectares for horse feed (pasture or forage production) and 7,000 hectares for buildings such as racecourses, sports facilities and stables.
- The country's native breeds are the Fredericksborg, the Jutland, the Knabstrup and the Faroe pony, which is one of Europe's oldest horse breeds and the least influenced by crossbreeding.

=== Ponies ===
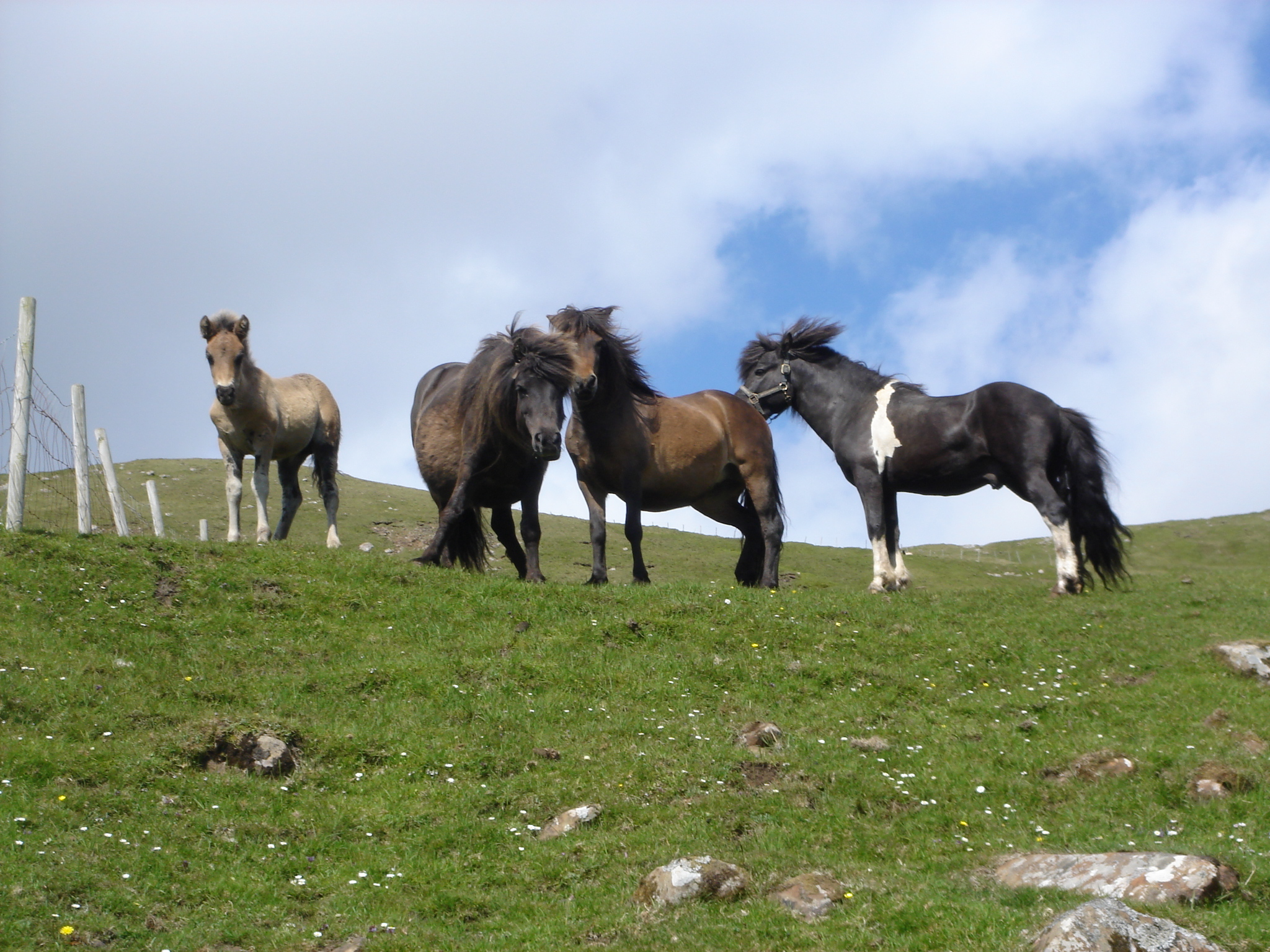
Herd of Faroese ponies.

According to the Delachaux guide, Denmark breeds mainly saddle and sport horses. Aline Decouty and Astrid Engelsen in their article (2017) for the

Institut Français du Cheval et de l'Equitation (French Equestrian Institute) contradicted this. According to them, 51% of the country's horses (90,000) are ponies of the Fjord, Haflinger, Danish sport pony, New Forest, Shetland, Icelandic, Gotland, Connemara, Dartmoor and miniature breeds. Being the Shetland pony the most common.

=== Saddle and sport horses ===
Danish trotters are bred from imported breeds using artificial insemination.

However, the trotter numbers are declining, with a loss of one-third of new births between 2010 and 2015, leaving a remaining herd of about 400 foals, 85 stallions, and 500 broodmares in 2015. This represents 2% of the total European trotter breeding herd with 251 breeders.

Purebred horses were abundant in 2010, although the number of new births is low.

In 2015, only 14 stallions, 160 broodmares, and 101 foals were registered, representing 0.11% of the world's registered purebreds. It is important to mention that the Oldenburg, imported from neighboring Germany, is rare.

=== Draft horses ===
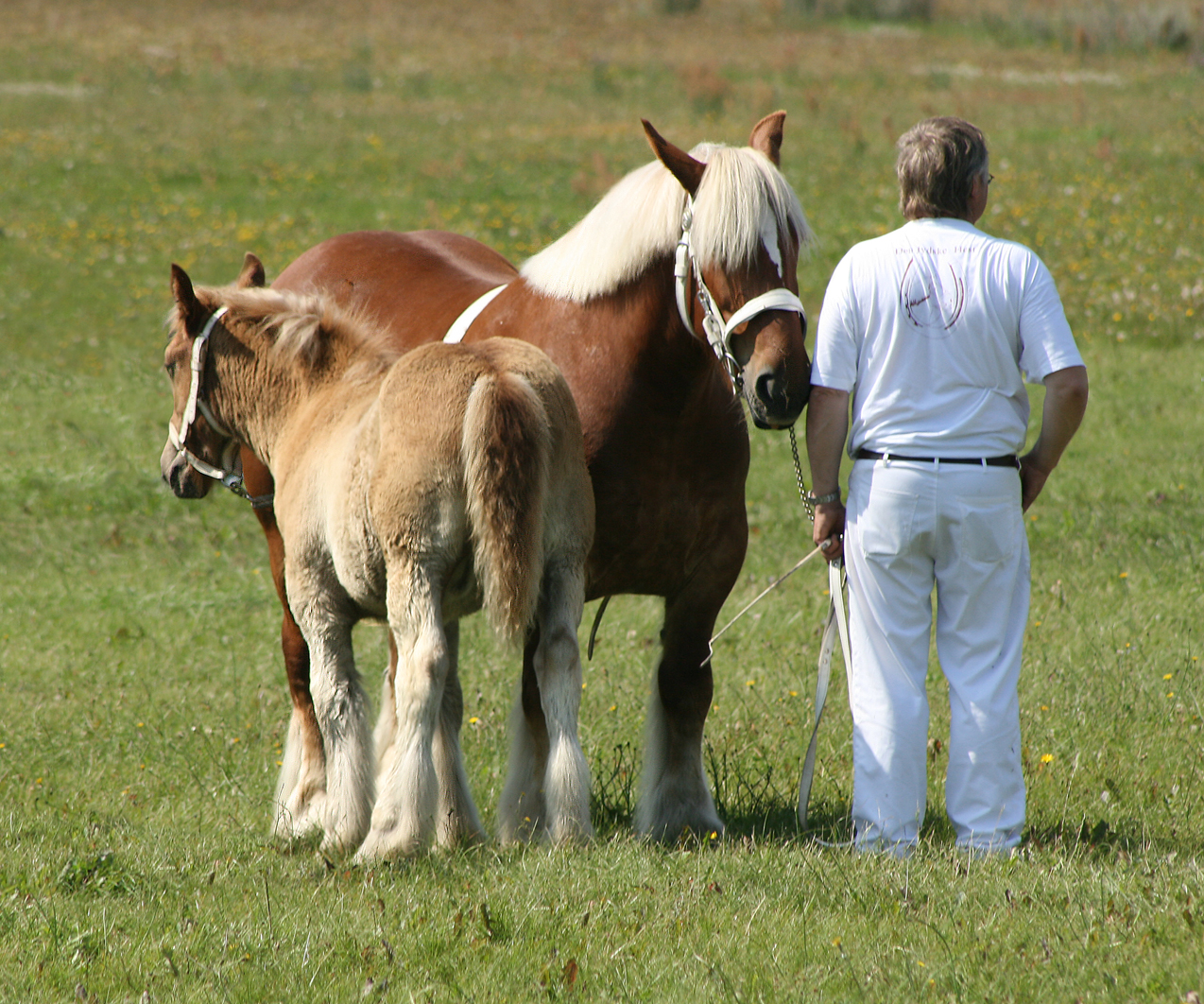
Juutland mare and foal

In addition to the local Jutland breed, which numbered 1,817 in 2017, Denmark is home to a small number of draft Belgian breeds.

== Culture ==
The horse is well represented in Danish proverbs, such as Det er en slem Heft som gaaer tilbage og ey freni, naar han stik, which means "It's a bad horse that moves backward instead of forwards when you give it a spur".

== See also ==
=== Bibliography ===
- Jensen, J. (1900). "Le cheval danois". L'agriculture en Danemark, texte, planches et gravures (in French). Libraire agricole de la maison rustique. pp. 135–140.
- Porter, Valerie; Alderson, Lawrence; Hall, Stephen; Sponenberg, Dan Phillip (2016). Mason's World Encyclopedia of Livestock Breeds and Breeding (1st ed.). CAB International. ISBN 978-1-84593-466-8.
- Rousseau, Élise (2016). Guide des chevaux d'Europe (in French). Illustrated by Yann Le Bris. DELACHAUX. p. 80. ISBN 978-2603024379.
- Tisserand, Eugène (1865). Études économiques sur le Danemark, le Holstein et le Slesvig (in French). V. Masson.

=== External links ===
- SEGES
