= Henson horse =

Modern horse breed from northeast France

Henson
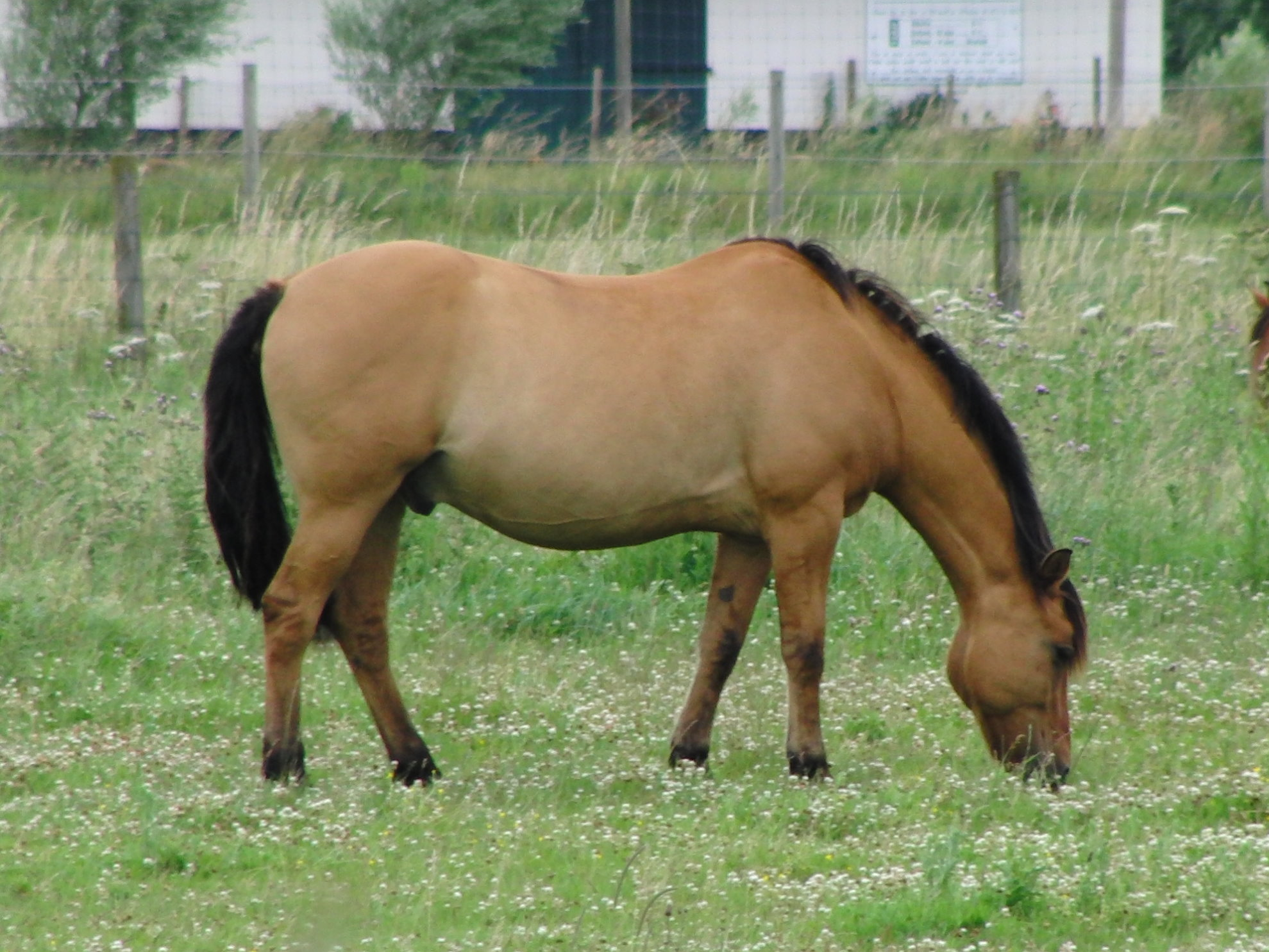

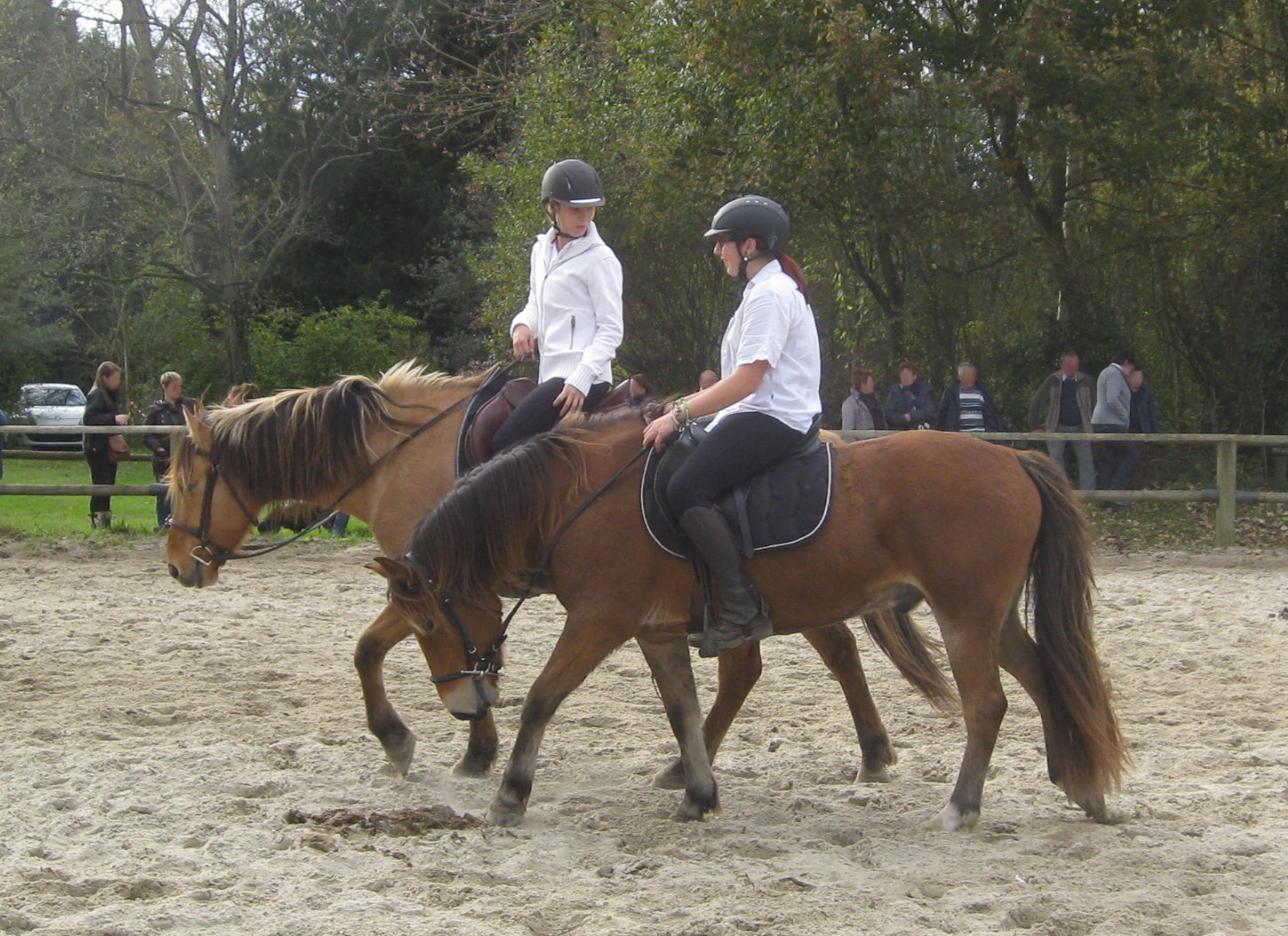
- Other names: Cheval Henson; Cheval de Henson
- Country of origin: France
- Use: Combined driving, Pony trekking, Endurance riding, Horseball

Traits
- Color: Dun

Breed standards
- Association du Cheval Henson; Haras Nationaux

The Henson horse, or cheval de Henson, is a modern horse breed from northwest France. It was created by the selective breeding of light saddle horses with the smaller, heavier Norwegian Fjord horse to create small horses suitable for the equestrian vacation industry. The breeders' association, Association du Cheval Henson, was formed in 1983. In 1995 the studbook was closed to horses not born from Henson parents, and in 2003 the breed was officially recognised by the French government agencies for horse breeding. A hardy breed of horse, each winter the broodmares and youngstock from several breeders are let loose together to graze freely in the wetland reserves in France.

== History ==
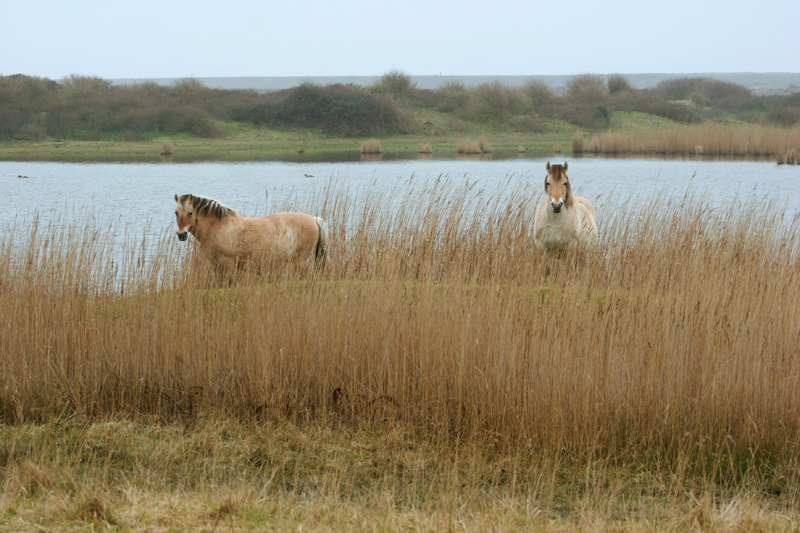
Hensons at Hâble-d'Ault

Unlike the majority of French horse breeds, the Henson was created in the late 20th century with the goal of obtaining a hardy horse adapted to all forms of equestrian tourism, outdoor riding and pleasure riding; it is therefore the most recent of all French horse breeds. The birthplace of the breed was the Baie de Somme in Picardy (now part of Hauts-de-France), a natural area of 70 km^{2}. The Henson became one of the emblems in the same way as birds, thanks to its mode of breeding "in the sense of a preserved area". Its economic impact remains modest but is growing from year to year with the rise of ecotourism. It is considered a regional success "in the new logic of horse riding".

Near the end of the 1970s, horseback riding became a popular form of outdoor recreation for nature-loving families. This led to increased interest in pony trekking as well as driving in the Somme, creating a need for a leisure horse suited to the region.

The Henson breed was originally an experimental cross between first generation Fjord horses and various other riding horses from the breeders Bernard Bizet and Lionel and Marc Berquin. In 1972, Bernard Bizet bought a Fjord stallion and four fillies with the idea of using them to breed a leisure horse, following a trip to Denmark in his youth. Fjord horses are an ideal breed for activities geared towards a younger clientele, and are hardy enough to live outside year round. In 1973, Bizet's Fjord stallion was too young to breed with his mares, so he decided to take them to the Haras Nationaux, and breed them to an Anglo-Arab.

In 1974, the birth of two Fjord cross Anglo-Arab foals attracted the attention of Lionel Berquin, attendant at the Centre Équestre de Morlay (Morlay Equestrian Centre). He discovered the talents of these foals. Adopted by the Association des Cavaliers de la Baie de Somme (located in Port-le-Grand), they were named "Henson" a few years later. They combine the Fjord's dun coat colour, hardiness and mental balance with the Anglo-Arab's fiery temperament and body adapted to driving and recreation. This cross resulted in heterosis, such that the hybrids retained the desired qualities of both parent-breeds. With the success of this breeding, the Fjords were also crossed with Trotters and Selle Français horses, but the Anglo-Arab proved to be the best cross.

Members of the breed's development project, including Berquin and Bizet, joined in 1982 and became the Association des Cavaliers de la Baie de Somme. Lionel Berquin co-created the Association of the Henson Horse that same year with Dominique Cocquet, then leader of the "Syndicat Mixte Pour l'Aménagement de la Côte Picarde" (Mixed Union for the Development of the Picardy Coast), to "give life to this crazy bet" which was to create a new breed of horse, promote it, and establish it. They gathered all their Fjord-cross horses, and bred their mares to the stallions. The goal was to get horses with similar phenotypes, so the genotype would be stable and reproducible, but also to have sufficient first generation animals that were 50/50. From 1984 to 1986, the 50/50 Fjord mares were bred to Anglo stallions; the progeny being 25% Fjord blood. The morphology and character were interesting but the dun coat colour was lost in more than half of the cases. The same mares were then bred to Fjords to produce foals that were 75% Fjord, in order to better establish the coat colour for selection criteria.

In 1986, the creation of the Henson horse breed was formalized by Bizet and Berquin. The little horse from the Baie de Somme had an identity, although it remained unrecognized by the Haras Nationaux. The fillies with 75% Fjord blood were bred in 1992 by Riesling Pierre and Agmar D'Oc, to two Anglo-Arabs from the Boismont stud belonging to the Haras Nationaux. In 1993, the first foal with 37.5% Fjord blood was born, Fantasio de Morlay, and was voted Best Foal of the Year at the Henson Festival in Marquenterre. The goal of the breeding was to create a horse for recreation through breeding registered mares, where the breeding of mares to their sires was forbidden in order to avoid inbreeding and its resultant health and genetic problems.

In 1989, the Association des Cavaliers de la Baie de Somme moved to the Marquenterre property, land of the Jeanson family. In 1995, they believed the population of first generation horses was sufficient, the breed studbook was closed to horses whose parents were not of the Henson breed. Purebred breeding continued exclusively on horses of second and following generations. This is why Henson horses born after this date are no longer bred from a cross between Fjord and saddle horses, contrary to popular belief.

The Henson was recognized as a breed by the Ministry of Agriculture and the Haras Nationaux in July 2003. Dominique Cocquet thought in 2010 that this breed had a future because 12 million French thought they would like to practice horse riding in contact with nature.

== Characteristics ==
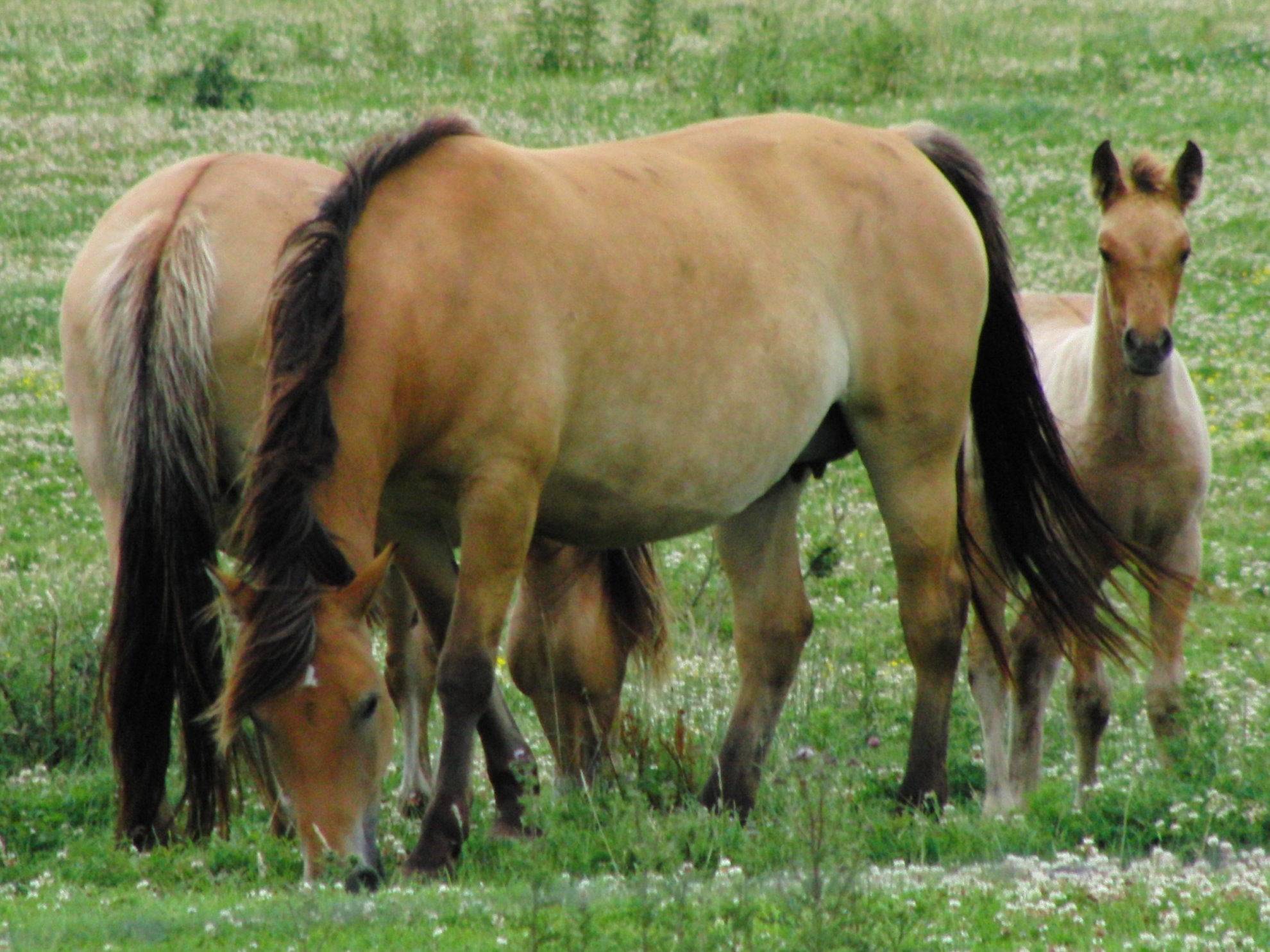
Henson horses

The Henson has between 25% and 50% Fjord blood and measures between 1.50 and 1.60 metres (14.3 and 15.3 hands; 59 and 63 in). As a result, it looks a lot like the Fjord, but is slightly taller and more slender. It is well-structured but not heavy. Its phenotype has well-marked features even though the relatively recent creation of this breed led to a certain lack of homogeneity. It is ranked among the 23 most beautiful horse breeds in the world by the "Cheval Pratique", a French equine magazine.

Morphological features are those of a pleasure horse, with extended gaits and a strong use of the hind limbs.

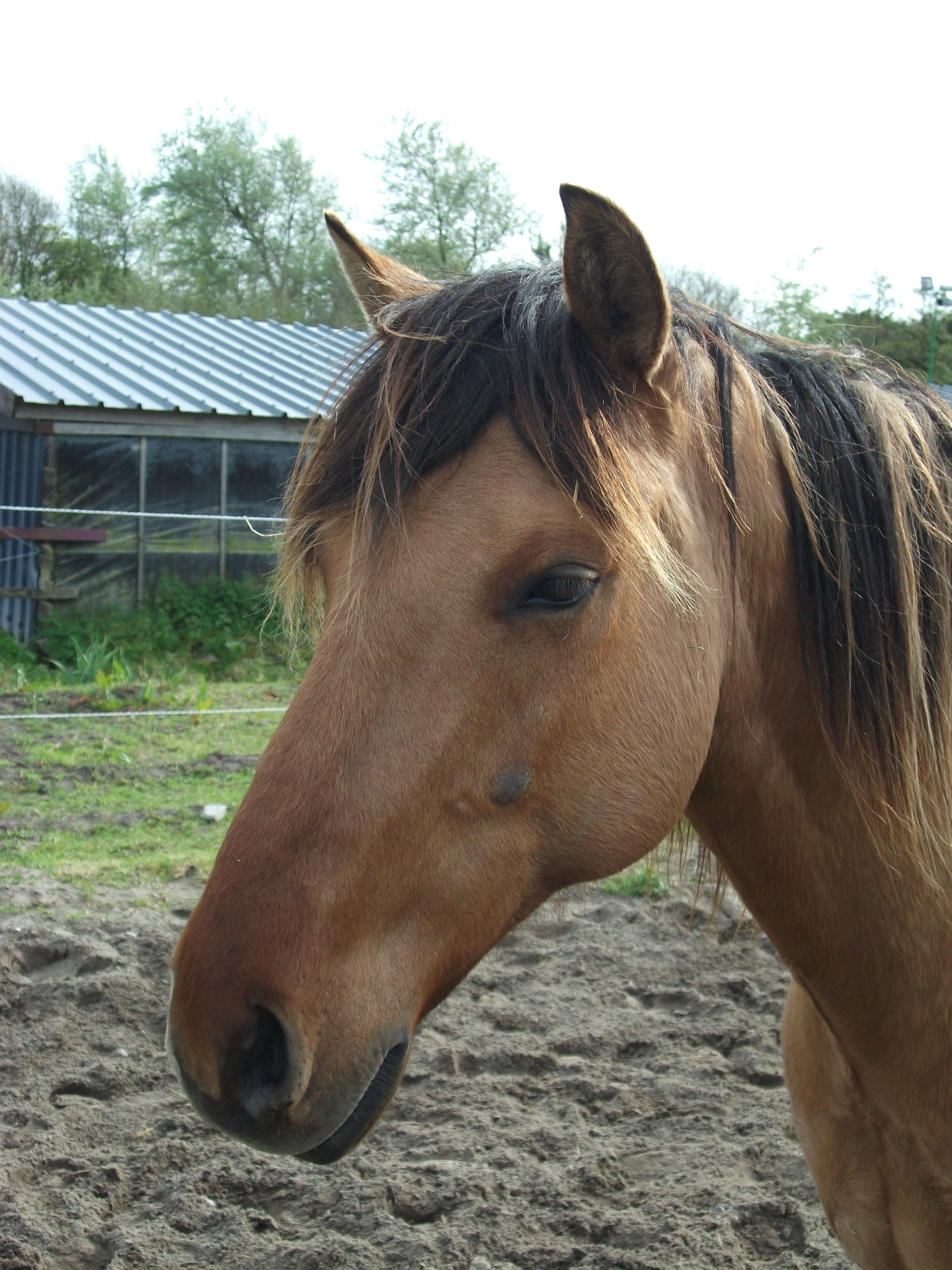
Henson head

The head is refined, expressive and as light as possible; it is generally medium-sized with relatively deep jowls and a straight or slightly concave profile. The ears are short and well-sculpted with a darker tip. The eyes are sharp, but with a sweet expression, and are surrounded by black skin. The neck is sufficiently long and not heavy, well set on the shoulders, but is usually relatively short and wide. The chest is broad, the shoulder long and sloping. The body is stocky, the back often short and wide but preferably of medium length. The hindquarters are large, the pasterns are short, legs solid and muscular with a hoof wall as strong as that of the Fjord. The hooves should not be light coloured.

The coat colour is most often a dark beige colour ranging from sand tones to brown, known as dun, and arises from the presence of the dun gene seen in the Fjord. Bay colouring is also acceptable. The presence of a dorsal stripe along the back is mandatory, and a lot of horses also have zebra-like striping or bars on the legs. White markings (stripe, blaze, socks, etc.) are discouraged, and are prohibited in breeding stallions so that they do not appear in their offspring. The mane is solid black or two-tone black-and-gold or black-and-white. The coat still lacks a bit of stability and periodically non-dun horses or carriers of white markings are born.

The Henson is described as having a confident manner, sociable and friendly. It is easily approached in the pasture. It is quiet, docile, versatile and hardy. Undemanding in the level of care and feeding, it can live outdoors year-round thanks to its hardiness and resistance. It is often reared in a natural manner outside, and reproduces unassisted, which gives balance and hardiness from birth. The many swamps and other wetlands in the Baie de Somme form the main area where it is traditionally bred and lives part of the year, living off the barren pastures and sandy or marshy ground without problems. This hardiness comes from its Fjord ancestors which are accustomed to harsh conditions. The presence of horses in Marquenterre attracts cattle egrets, and it complements the presence of salt-meadow sheep. A study done at the University of Lille I concluded that this horse integrates well into this ecosystem.

=== Selection ===
The Henson Horse Association has been the national breed association since 3 February 1983. Its purpose is to consolidate breeders and owners of Henson horses, manage the studbook, guide the direction of the breed, develop it, and promote it. To help renew the blood in the breed, the Henson studbook has a "Henson factor" section open to horses crossed between a Fjord horse and a Thoroughbred, Anglo-Arabian, Selle Français, French Trotter, Andalusian or American Quarter Horse — maintaining 25% to 50% Fjord blood and a coat colour that meets the Henson breed standard.

There is a limit to the number of breedings permitted per stallion — a maximum of ten mares for stallions up to six years old, and up to fifty mares for stallions over six years. Artificial insemination and embryo transfer are not allowed, and the approval of a stallion or a mare for breeding is subject to passing a qualification test as to appearance, character and gait.

== Use ==
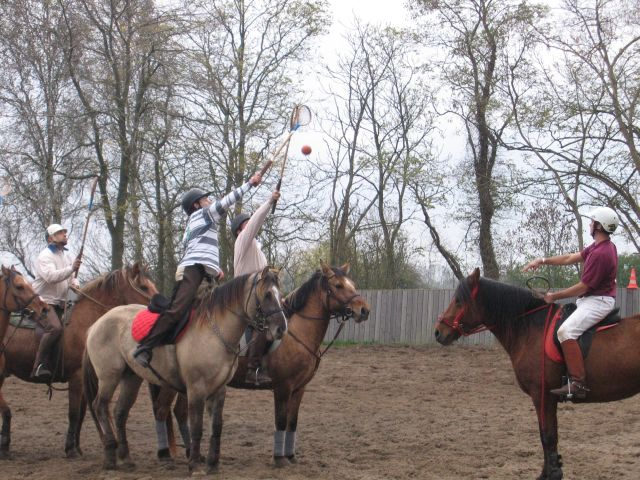
Polocrosse competition between the Marquenterre team (on the Henson horses) and the English national team

The Henson is used for all kinds of outdoor and pleasure riding and is suitable for beginners to advanced riders. It is widely used for this activity in Marquenterre. Described as an "interesting experience" in the field of leisure, according to Lætitia Bataille, the Henson does not have the qualities of horse breeds that have been selected for several centuries.

The Henson has great endurance, and is both handy and fast. It can participate in polocrosse and is used for hunting. Driving, where a team of four Henson horses earned a bronze medal in the Championship of France, horse-ball, in which the women's team of Marquenterre was national champion of France in 2002, endurance and Le TREC, where the Henson is seen at the national level, are among its preferred disciplines. Thanks to its coat colour, it is striking in the field of traditional driving.

It is also used for the maintenance of the marshes of the Somme, in its role as a grazing animal.

== Distribution ==
In 2007 the FAO had no data on the conservation status of the breed; population data was first reported to DAD-IS in 2020, according to which the total population in 2018 was 977, with 515 breeding mares and 49 stallions. The breed is now stabilised and bred mainly for pleasure, while some find opportunities in sport. These horses are found in all pastures of the Baie de Somme and in the Marquenterre. The Baie de Somme, and in particular the Marquenterre, birthplace of the breed, is the main breeding area. The horses are also found throughout France and in Belgium. Since 2008, this horse is found in Nord-Pas-de-Calais, the departments of Oise and Eure, and on a farm located in Berry.

There were about 400 Hensons identified in France in 2010, including 200 in the equestrian "Henson-Marquenterre" area, in Tourmont-Saint-Quentin, and equestrian "L'Étrier" area, in the Baie d'Authie. In 2011, a new equestrian area dedicated to this horse began in Rue, the "Henson Stud". In 2006, there were 31 breeders, 9 stallions standing at stud, and 36 new births. These numbers were relatively stable over the following years.

Year	2004	2005	2006	2007	2008
Number of births in France.	20	32	43	43	?

== Trans'Henson gathering ==
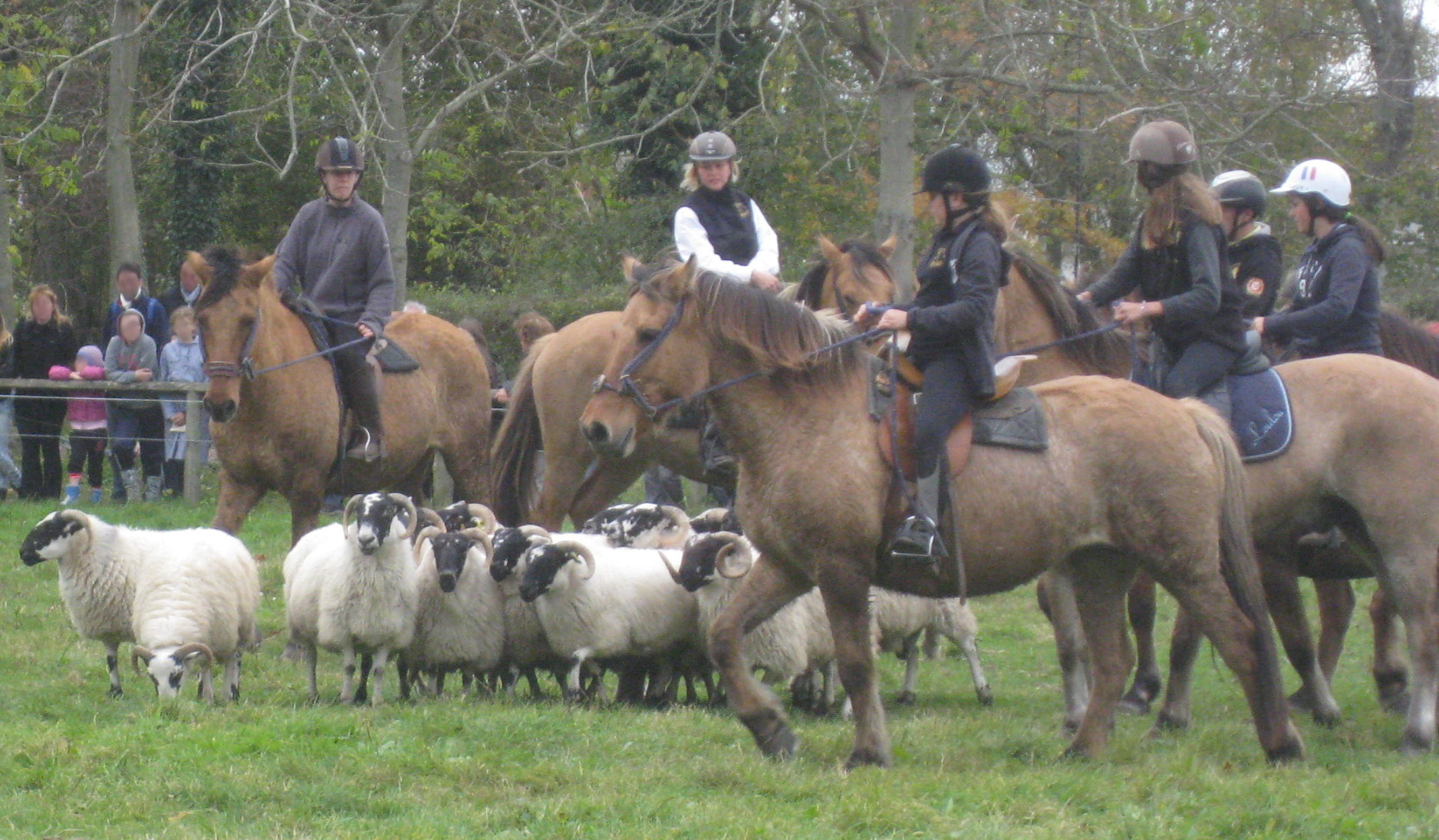
Trans'Henson 2014

The last weekend of October, during All Saints' Day, marks the "Trans'Henson", a gathering by Henson horse owners who assemble the year's foals, broodmares and young stock (from one to three years old) to reunite them on the winter pasture close to the centre of Saint-Quentin-en-Tourmont. It is an opportunity to see more than 200 horses gathered. A "Ferya" is organized in mid-July, exhibiting horses and selecting the most beautiful colt and the most beautiful filly. Otherwise, these animals participate in other events such as the Paris International Agricultural Show, where they were the stars in 2003.

== See also ==
- List of French horse breeds
