= Danish Sport Pony =

Breed of riding pony

- Country of origin: Denmark

Traits
- Distinguishing features: well-formed head and neck, sloping shoulders, prominent withers and usually dark in color

The Danish Sport Pony is a breed of riding pony. The Danish Sport Pony Breeding Association began breeding for the pony in the 1970s. The ponies are classified according to height and grouped into three classifications. It is usually dark, although the classic color was originally gray. The horses are registered through the Landsudvalget.

== Characteristics ==
The Danish Sport Pony should never be taller than 14.2^{1}/_{4} hands (58.25 inches, 148 cm). The riding classes for Danish Sport ponies are separated into three categories: ponies up to 14.2 hands; ponies up to 13.2 hands (54 inches, 137 cm); and ponies up to 12.2 hands (50 inches, 127 cm). The ideal pony has muscular limbs, giving it both agility and speed. It should also have a well-formed head and neck, sloping shoulders and prominent withers. Its back should be muscular, as should its thighs. Traditionally, the predominant color was gray, but over time and with crossbreeding, Danish Sport Ponies are also bay, chestnut, and black. Since the Danish Sport Pony is meant to be used as a mount for children, it should have a good temperament; calm and obedient.

== History ==
The Danish Sport Pony breed has only become a serious endeavor for Danish breeders within the past few decades because Icelandic and Norwegian horses were more popular as mounts. When pony riding rose in popularity, however, the demand for ponies increased. To cope with the demand, the Danish Sport Pony Breeding Association was formed in 1976. The organization was dedicated to creating a uniform breed of riding ponies, and this they achieved by crossing different breeds with the Danish Sport Pony. The horse breeds used for development of the Danish Sport Pony included the Connemara pony, New Forest pony, Welsh pony and Arabian horse. Today, Danish Sport Ponies are registered through the Landsudvalget.

== Related articles ==
- Horses in Denmark
