= Jutland horse =

Danish horse breed

Jutland
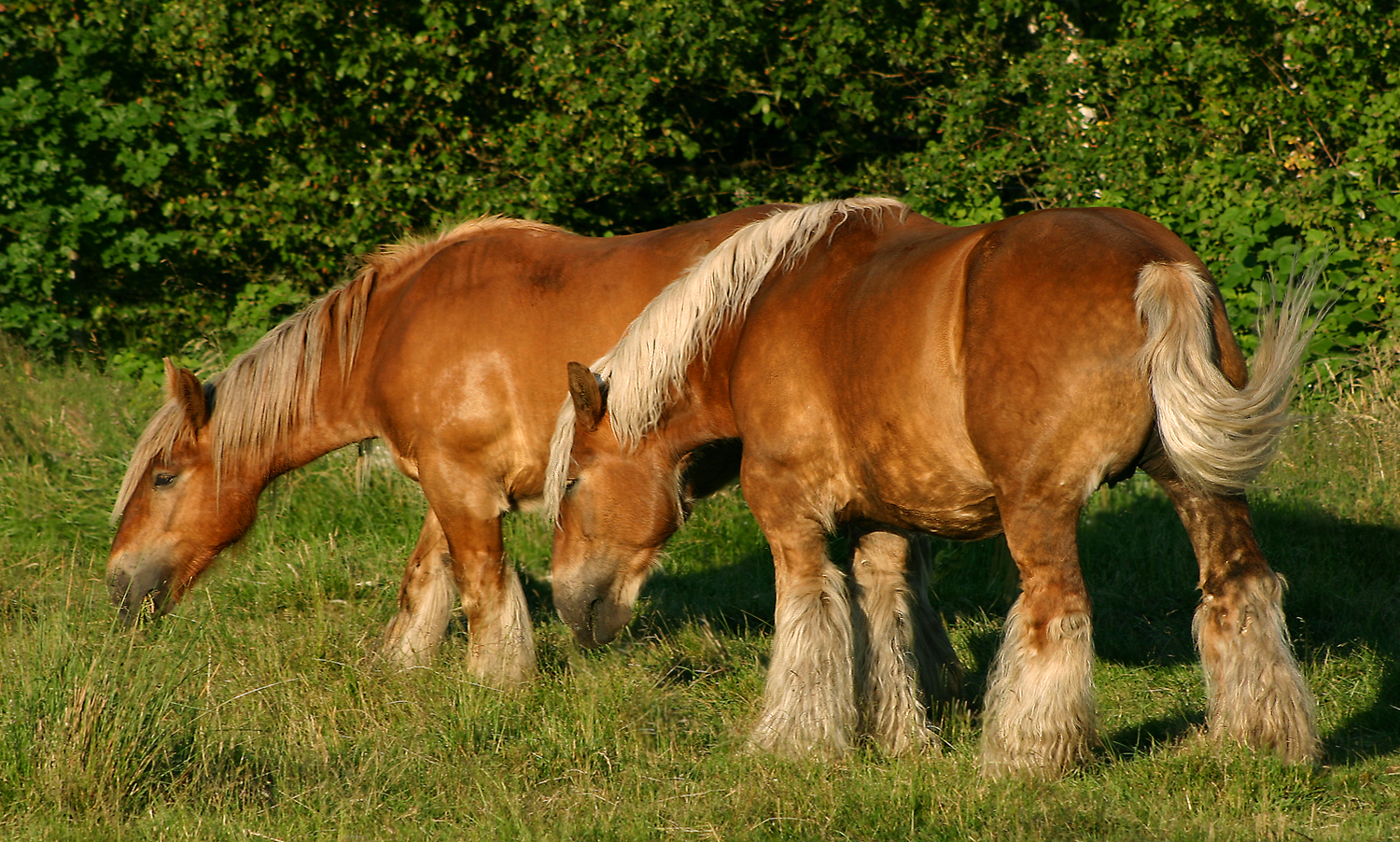

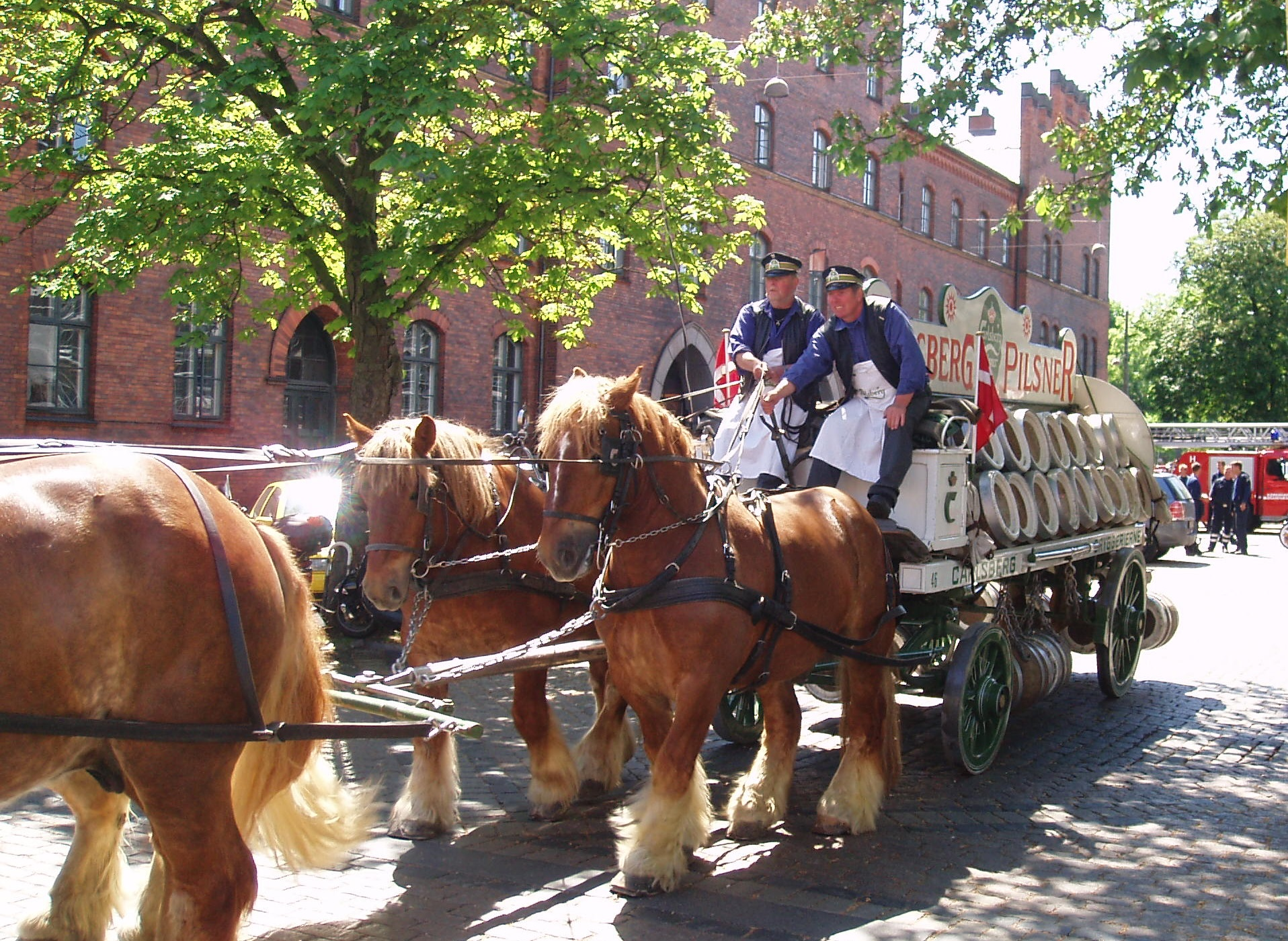
- Other names: Jydsk; Danish; Cheval du Jutland
- Country of origin: Denmark

The Jutland horse (Danish: Den jyske hest) is a draft horse breed originating in Denmark, named after the Jutland Peninsula which forms the western part of the country. Usually chestnut, they are a compact, muscular breed known for their calm and willing temperament. The breed was originally developed for use in agriculture, but today is more often seen in urban settings and at horse shows. Some of the best known members of the breed pull beer wagons for the Carlsberg brewery around Copenhagen, as well as at competitions and for demonstrations. Images from the 9th century show a horse similar to the Jutland being used by Viking raiders in what is now Great Britain. The first written record is from the 12th century, when they were popular as war horses. Some infusion of bloodlines from other breeds occurred in the 18th century, but the modern Jutland type only began about 1850 with the addition of blood from several other breeds, mainly draft horses. A stud book was created in the late 19th century, and the Jutland population grew to a maximum around 15,000 by 1950. Numbers subsequently declined, and as of 2011, only an estimated 1,000 horses remained.

== Characteristics ==
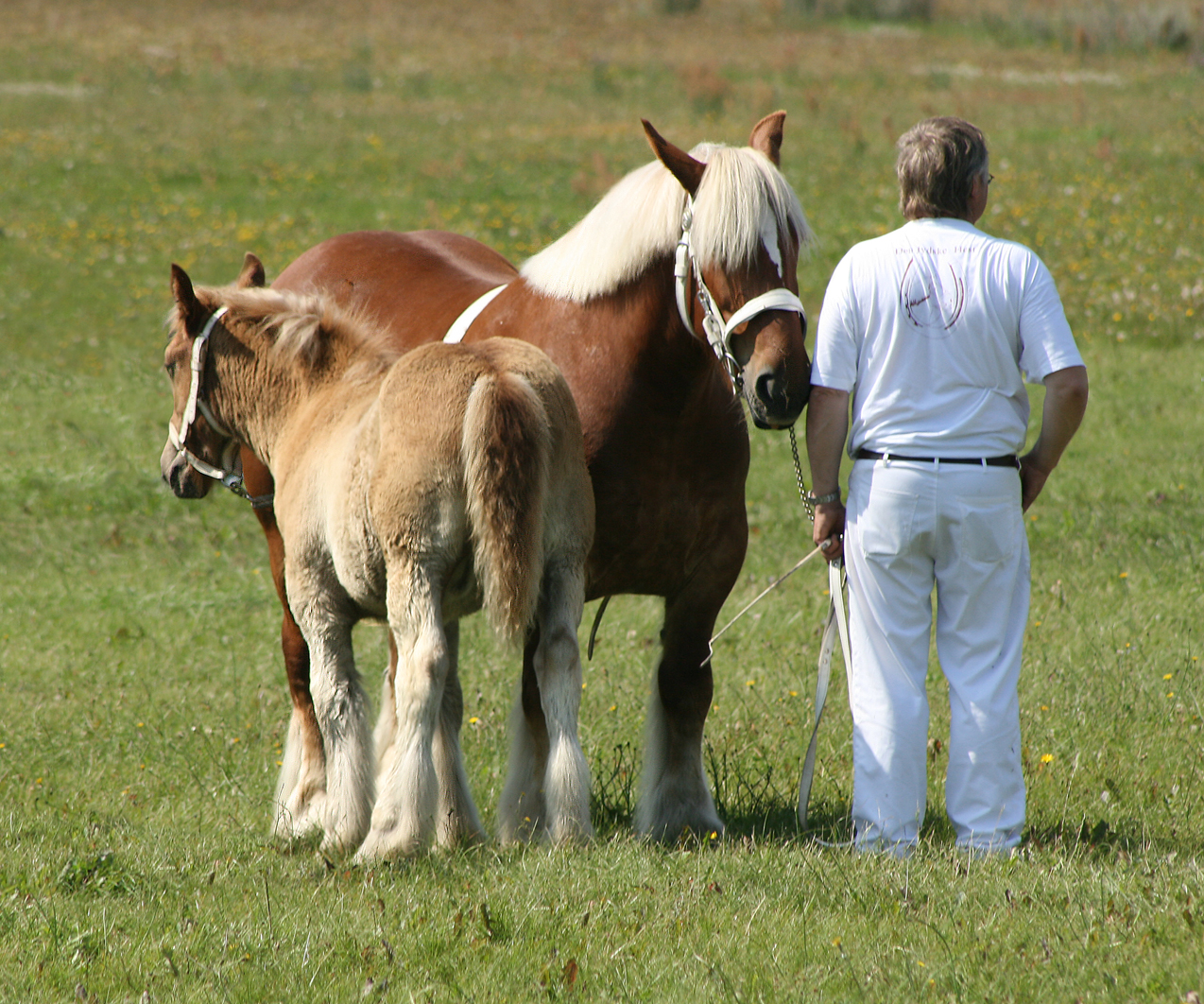
Mare and foal

The Jutland is typically chestnut, but may also be bay, gray, black, or roan, and frequently has white markings. In the early 1900s, most Jutlands were bay or black, but those colors are now in the minority; chestnut is now considered to be the horse's "national color" and is selectively bred. They generally stand between 15 and 16.1 hands (60 and 65 inches, 152 and 165 cm), and weigh between 1,430 and 1,760 pounds (650 and 800 kg). The breed has a convex facial profile, a short, arched neck, low withers, a wide chest and straight shoulder, and a slightly sloped croup. Overall, it is a compact, muscular breed. Their temperament is calm yet energetic, and they are considered by breed enthusiasts to be willing workers.

Although compact in size, the Jutland is a strong, powerful horse that was used to transport carriages and heavy goods. An 1897 publication by the United States Bureau of Foreign Commerce noted the ability of the horse to pull carriages, and stated, "For this class of work and for heavy draft generally there is probably no better animal than the Jutland horse—a heavy, powerful beast."

== Breed history ==
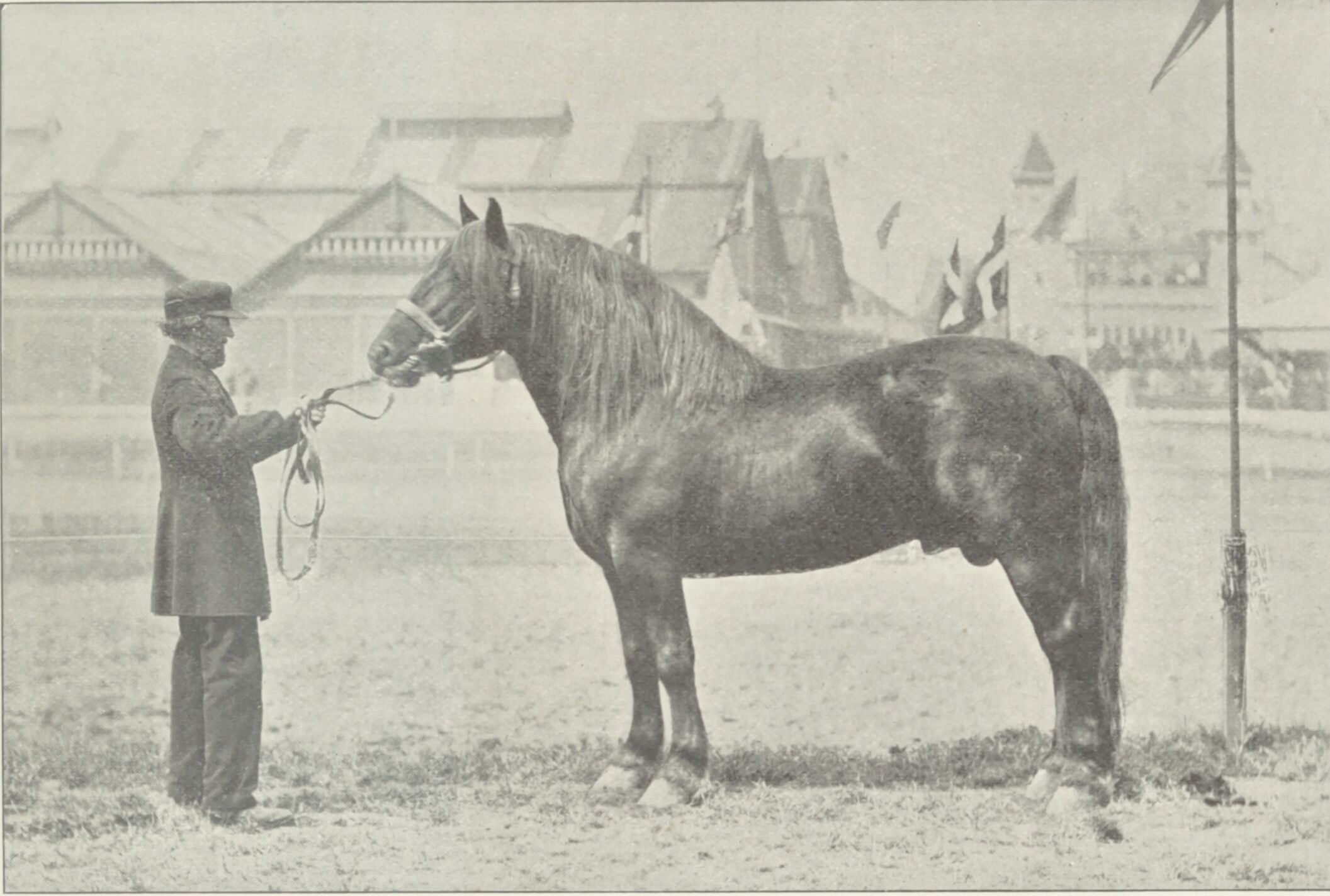
Jutland horse (1900)

The origins of the breed are not fully documented, but some evidence points to the ancestors of the Jutland being used by the Vikings during the early 9th century. Images from the time show Viking raiders in what is now Great Britain riding horses similar in appearance to the modern Jutland. Some of those horses may have been left behind, contributing to the base stock from which the Suffolk Punch was eventually developed. Horses from Jutland were exported to England, Germany, and France during the Middle Ages, and were popular mounts for knights, especially for use in jousting. The first mention of the Jutland type is from the 12th century, when they are documented as war horses with many useful attributes. The Jutland horse appears in the Danish ballad "Svend Felding's Kamp med Risen", in which mythic hero Svend Fælling goes on a pilgrimage to Rome and on his journey encounters a giant. Other horses prove too shy or too weak to enable him to confront the giant, so Svend obtains a Jutland horse from a passing miller, who claims that it is strong enough to carry 15 skippund. Mounted on the Jutland, Svend succeeds in killing the giant.

The Frederiksborg horse, another Danish breed, influenced the Jutland during the 18th century. The Frederiksborg had a significant amount of Spanish influence, and was used to give the Jutland more active gaits. Selection for the modern-day Jutland appears to have begun around 1850, when Suffolk Punch and Ardennes blood was crossbred on native bloodstock. Cleveland Bay and Yorkshire Coach Horse (a Cleveland Bay/Thoroughbred cross) horses were also added during the 19th century. The development of the breed was significantly influenced by a stallion named Oppenheim LXII, imported into Denmark in 1862. Sources disagree as to whether Oppenheim was a purebred Suffolk Punch or a Suffolk/Shire cross. Six generations from Oppenheim, his descendant, Aldrup Munkedal (spelled Oldrup Munkedal in some sources), was foaled. Aldrup Munkedal is considered the founding stallion of the modern breed. Most Jutlands alive today descend from two of his sons, Hovding and Prins af Jylland. The Jutland strongly resembles the Schleswig, another heavy draft breed with similar origins that was influenced by Oppenheim LXII and his descendants. With the exception of feathering on its lower legs, the Jutland also resembles the Suffolk Punch.

The first stud book for the breed was created in 1881, and 22,000 horses were registered between then and 2007. In 1887, the first breeders' association was formed. The first stallions were evaluated according to breed standard in 1888, the same year the Cooperative Jutlandic Breeding Association was created. In 1898, the "Federated Funen Horse Breeding Societies" were established in Funen, dedicated to the development of Jutland horse breeding and other heavy draught horses. By the 1950s, Jutland population numbers exceeded 15,000, and 405 stud farms were devoted to their breeding in Denmark, but since that time, population numbers have dwindled. Though numbers dropped, a 2008 study of the 716 Jutland horses in the Danish studbook at that time concluded that little risk of the Jutland becoming extinct existed due to inbreeding or low genetic diversity. The study, which also included populations of the Knabstrupper and Fredericksborg breeds, theorized that the greatest loss to genetic diversity for horses in Denmark would be through the extinction of the Jutland breed, because of its genetic distance from the other two native breeds. The level of genetic diversity of the three Danish breeds was found to be similar to other European breeds. As of 2011, one Danish breed conservation organization estimates that about 1,000 Jutlands remained.

== Uses ==
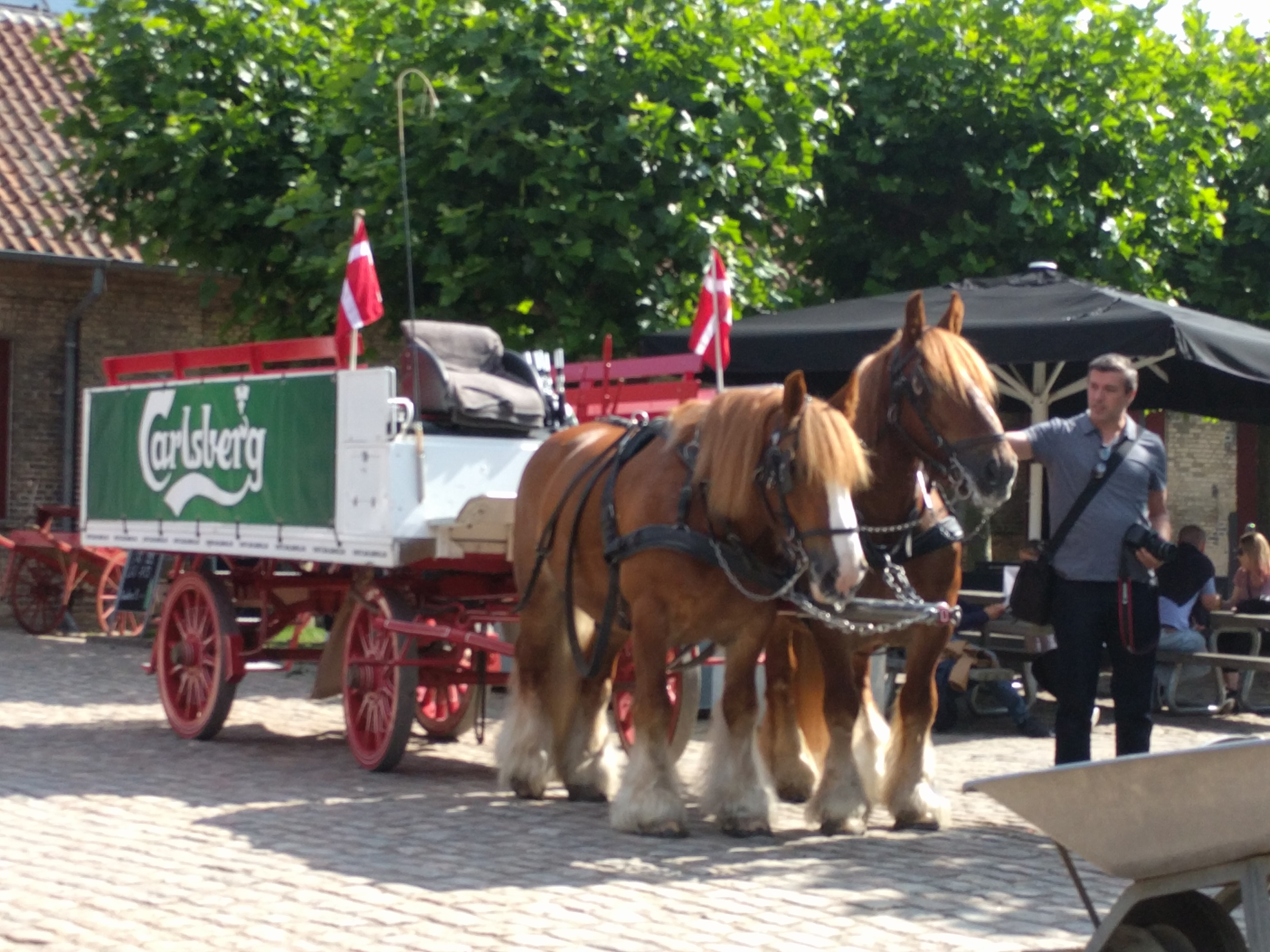
Carlsberg wagon

Although originally bred for use on farms, few members of the breed are used for agricultural purposes today, and are now mostly bred for horse shows and working in urban areas. However, the Carlsberg brewery has used the Jutland to pull its drays since 1928. The brewery owned 210 Jutlands at their peak, but nowadays uses only four hourses for transporting beer around Copenhagen. The Carlsberg horses also compete and put on demonstrations at many shows, promoting the brewery and the breed.

== See also ==
- Horses in Denmark
