= Pleasure riding =

Form of equestrianism

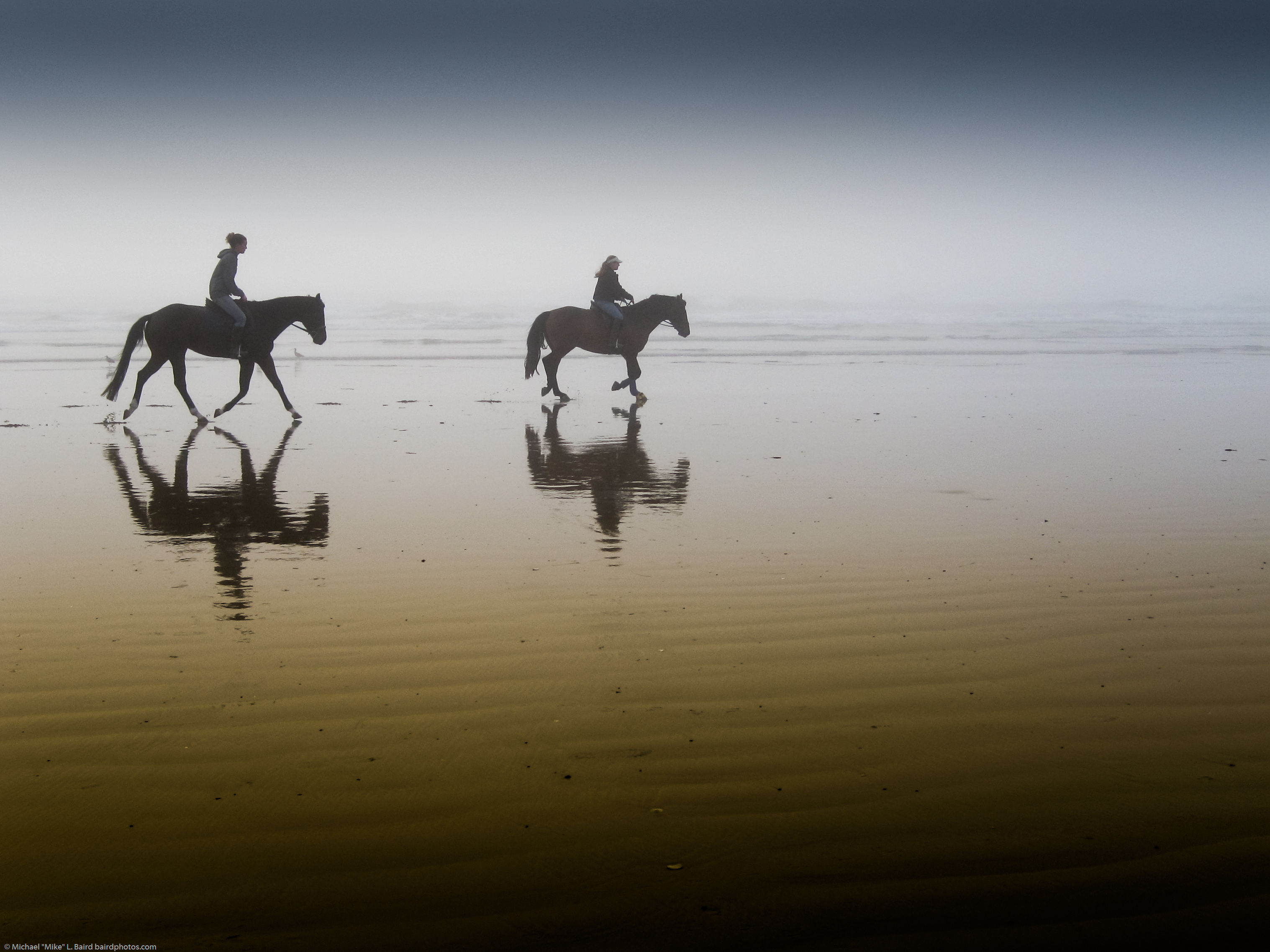
Pleasure riding on Morro Strand State Beach

Pleasure riding is a form of equestrianism that encompasses many forms of recreational riding for personal enjoyment, absent elements of competition. In horse show competition, a wide variety of classes are labeled pleasure classes with judging standards based on the concept that horses or ponies exhibited should be well-mannered and thus a “pleasure” to ride.

Pleasure riding is called hacking in British English, and in parts of the eastern United States and Canada. In the United States, particularly the American west, the term trail riding is used to describe recreational pleasure riding, particularly on public lands.

== Pleasure riding ==
Many horses are suitable for pleasure riding, including grade horses and other animals of ordinary quality and good disposition. Such horses are sometimes called "hacks," particularly in areas where pleasure riding is known as hacking.

Statistics provided by the American Horse Council (AHC) in a 2005 study indicated that out of 9.2 million horses in the United States, the largest number, 3.9 million, were used for recreation, and this activity directly contributed $11.8 billion, or roughly one-third of the GDP effect of the horse industry. Later studies reinforce these numbers. A 2008 survey found that pleasure/trail riding was the primary pursuit for 78% of Wisconsin horses and 80% of horse owners. Similarly, a 2006 study in Virginia found that 48.4% of the horses in that state were used for pleasure riding.

The prevalence of pleasure riding and its economic impact also dispels the misperception that horse ownership is only for the wealthy. The 2005 AHC study also found that approximately 34% of horse owners have an annual household income of less than $50,000, 46% have an income of between $25,000 to $75,000, and 28% have an income of over $100,000.

Horse showing ranks second in the AHC study of horse activities, with 2.7 million horses involved. Even in competition, the term "pleasure" or "hack" is also applied to a number of horse show classes where the performance of the animals are judged on their manners, performance and way of going, originally to determine a horse's suitability to be a pleasure riding mount.

== See also ==
- Trail riding
- Western pleasure
- English pleasure
- Show hack
- Pleasure driving
- Leisure horses
- Bicycle touring
- Motorcycle touring
