= Fjord horse =

Breed of horse

Fjord
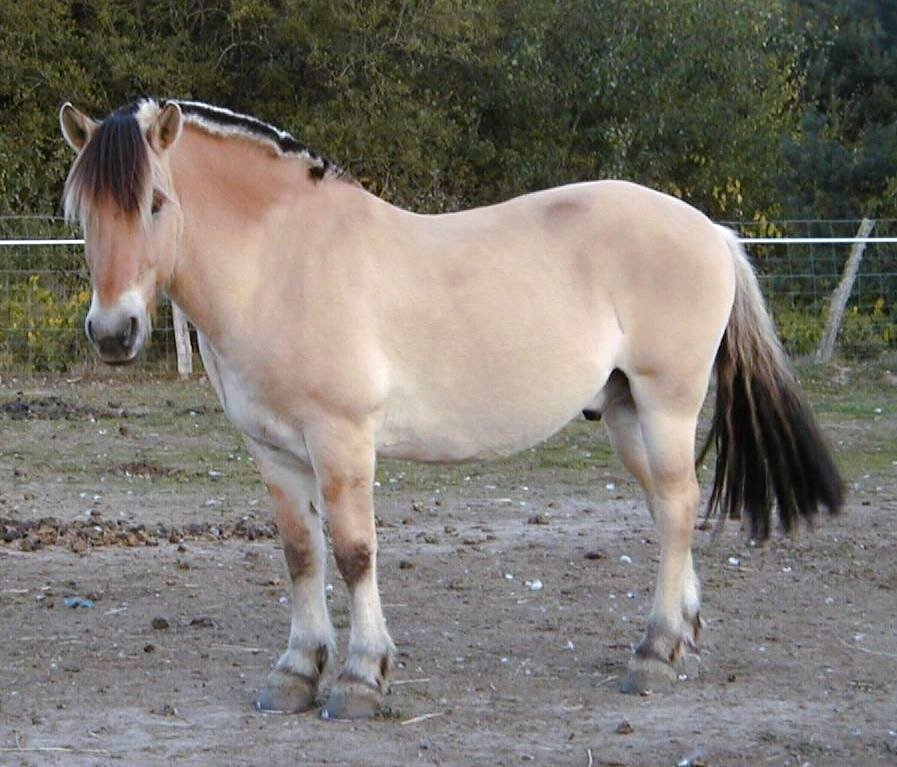

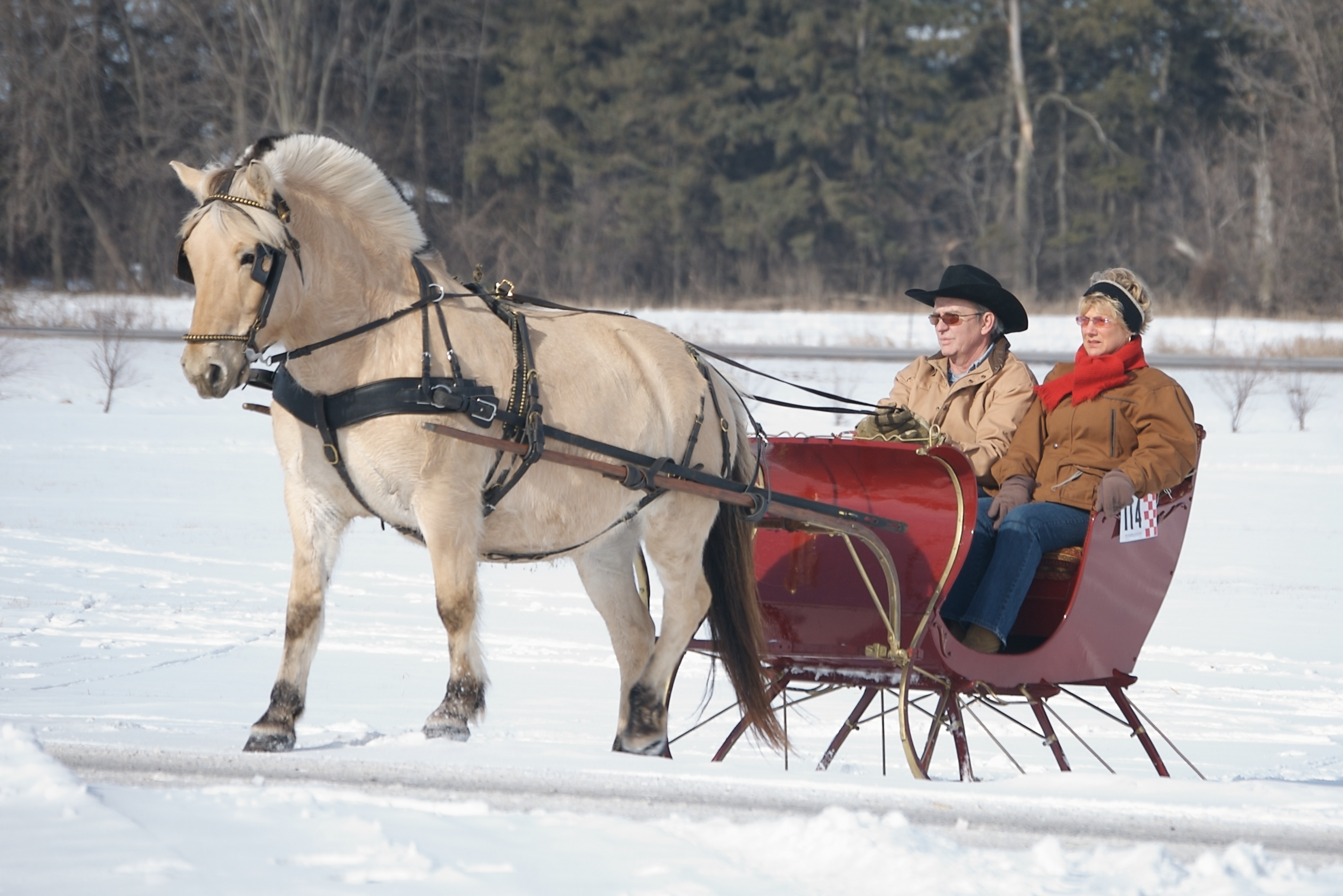
- Other names: Norwegian Fjord Horse; Fjording; Fjordhest; Fjord Horse
- Country of origin: Norway
- Use: riding; driving

Traits
- Weight: 400 to 500 kilograms (880 to 1,100 lb)
- Height: 135 and 150 cm (13.1 and 14.3 hands; 53 and 59 inches)
- Colour: dun

Breed standards
- Norges Fjordhestlag (Norwegian Fjord Horse Association, in English); Fjord Horse International

The Fjord or Norwegian Fjord Horse (Norwegian: fjordhest) is a relatively small but very strong horse breed from the mountainous regions of western Norway. It is an agile breed of light draught horse build. It is always dun in colour, with five variations in shade recognised in the breed standard. One of the world's oldest breeds, it has been used for hundreds of years as a farm horse in Norway, and in modern times is popular for its generally good temperament. It is used both as a harness horse and under saddle.

== Characteristics ==
The conformation of the Norwegian Fjord Horse differs from that of many other breeds in that it is a blend of draught horse muscling and bone, with smaller size and greater agility. It has a strong, arched neck, sturdy legs and good feet, and a compact, muscular body. The head is medium-sized and well defined with a broad, flat forehead and a straight or slightly dished face, with small ears and large eyes. Despite its small size, the breed is fully capable of carrying an adult human and pulling heavy loads. The hair coat becomes particularly heavy and thick in the winter.

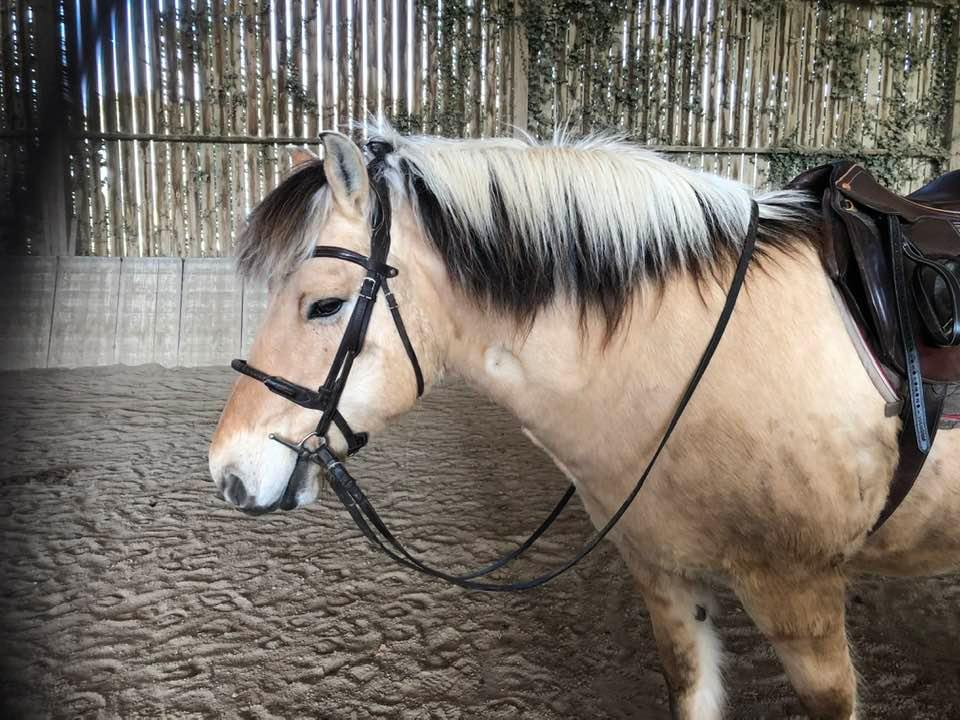
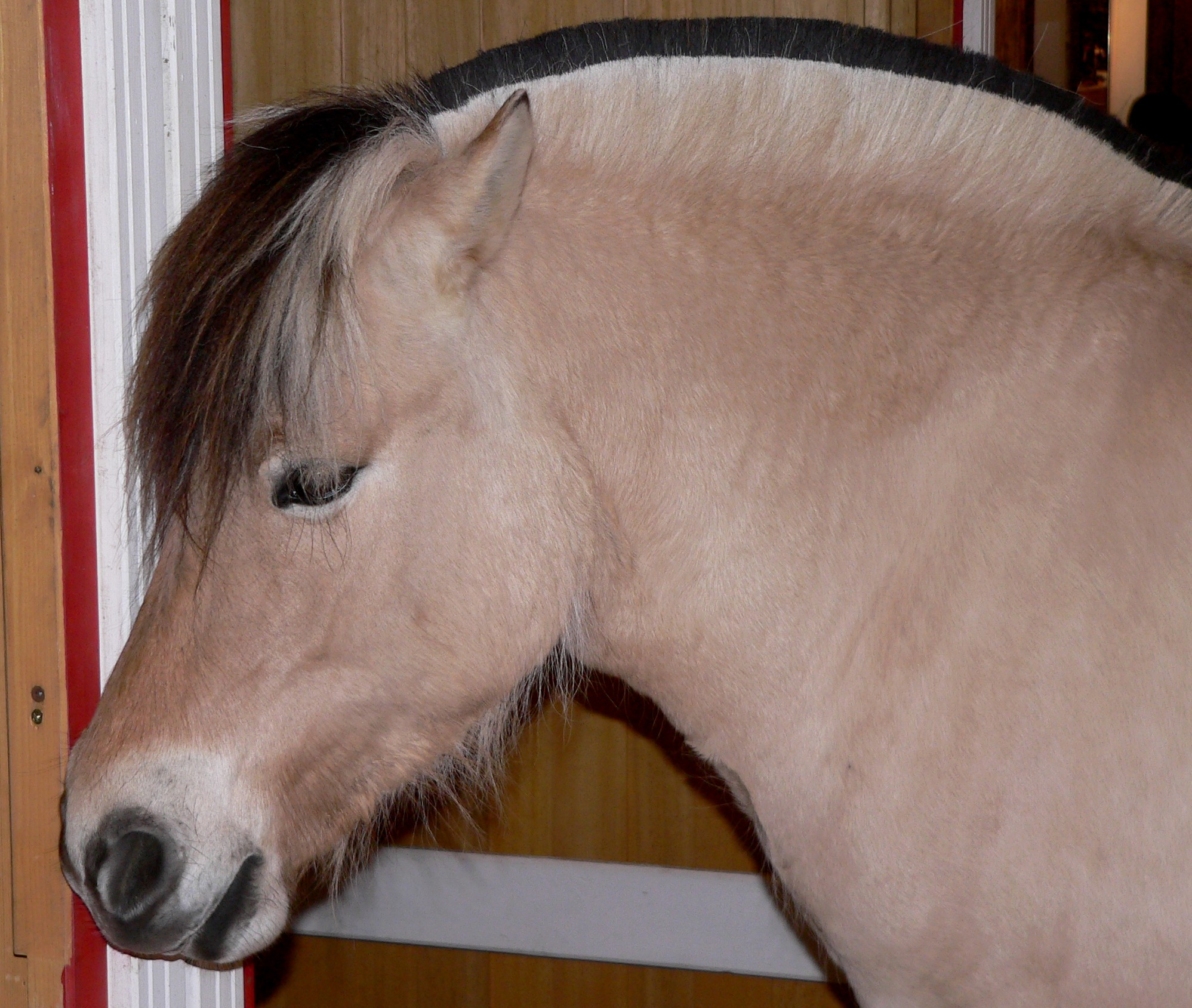
A natural mane and a typical trimmed mane

The natural mane is long, thick, and heavy, but is usually clipped in a distinctive crescent shape to between 5 and 10 cm (2.0 and 3.9 in) so that it stands straight up and emphasises the shape of the neck. This roached mane is thought to make for easier grooming. It also accentuates the horse's strong neck and full-length dorsal stripe. There is some feathering on the lower legs; however, the breed standard discourages profuse feathering.

There is no upper or lower limit for height set for the breed, but heights between 135 and 150 cm (13.1 and 14.3 hands; 53 and 59 inches) at the withers are recommended. The weight normally ranges from 400 to 500 kilograms (880 to 1,100 lb).

=== Colour ===
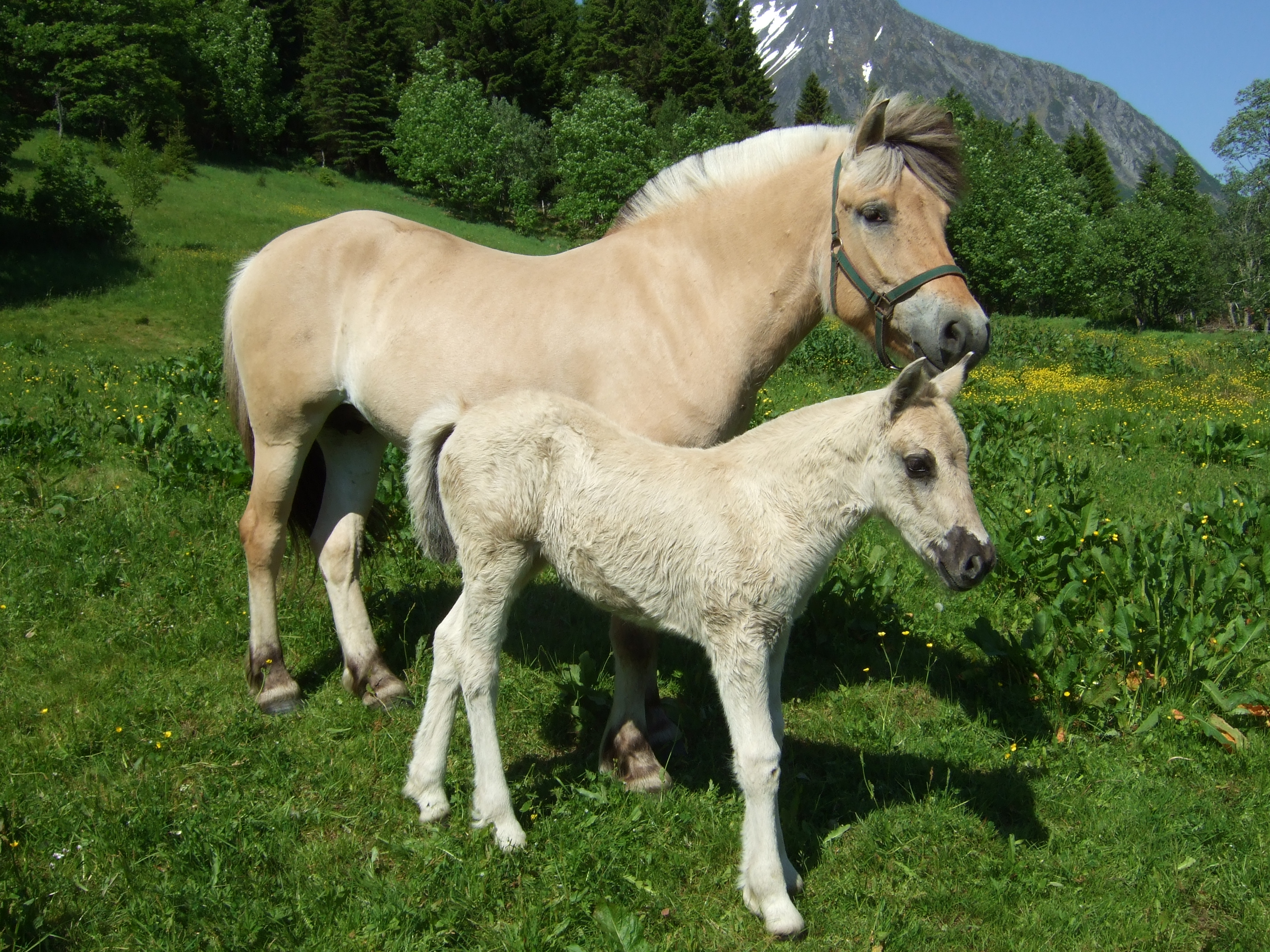
Mare and foal of slightly different shades

Most of the horses are dun. Dun is a body colour that is a tan, gold or related shade with darker (usually black or dark brown) points and primitive markings. The breed standard recognises five shade variations. These shades have been officially recognised in Norway since 1922. The hooves are most often dark, but can be a lighter brown colour on lighter-coloured horses.

The dun colour itself is a dominant dilution gene. All the horses are dun; therefore, they are homozygous or nearly so for dun colouration. No equine coat colour genetics studies have been done specifically on the horses; but if they were not homozygous for the dun gene, then a dark-coloured, non-dun individual could occasionally occur. However, this is very rare or non-existent today; dark cropouts existed in the past, but breed standardisation has favoured duns and the colour is now produced consistently.

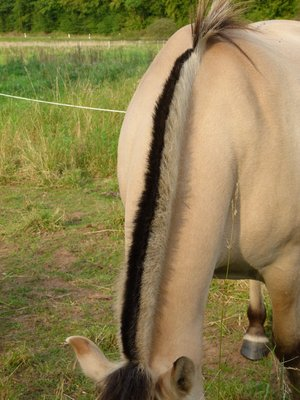
Two-toned mane, showing black midtstol, characteristic of the breed

The primitive markings associated with the dun gene are often quite vivid. These include the dorsal stripe, darker mane and tail, horizontal stripes on the back of the forearms, and, in rare cases, transverse striping across the withers. Some horses have small brown spots on the body or the head. These spots are called "Njal marks" after one of the foundation sires of the breed, who had such markings. The horses are also consistent for having pangare traits: lighter hair on the muzzle, belly, inside of legs, and over the eyes. Some also carry the cream gene, which combines with the dun gene to create the lighter shades of the breed.

The horses have a significant amount of lighter hairs on the outside edges of the mane and edges of the tail, and when teamed with the darker-coloured centre of the mane common to most colour shades gives a two-toned look that is more dramatic than seen in dun horses of other breeds. The dark section of hair in the middle of the mane and the darker hair in the middle of the tail are described by the Norwegian terms midtstol and halefjær, respectively.

White markings are rare, but have been noted as long as written records have been kept of the breed. A small star is acceptable, but any other white or pink markings are considered undesirable. Norges Fjordhestlag (The Norwegian Fjord Horse Association) decided in 1982 that stallions of any age with any other white markings than a small white star cannot be accepted for breeding.

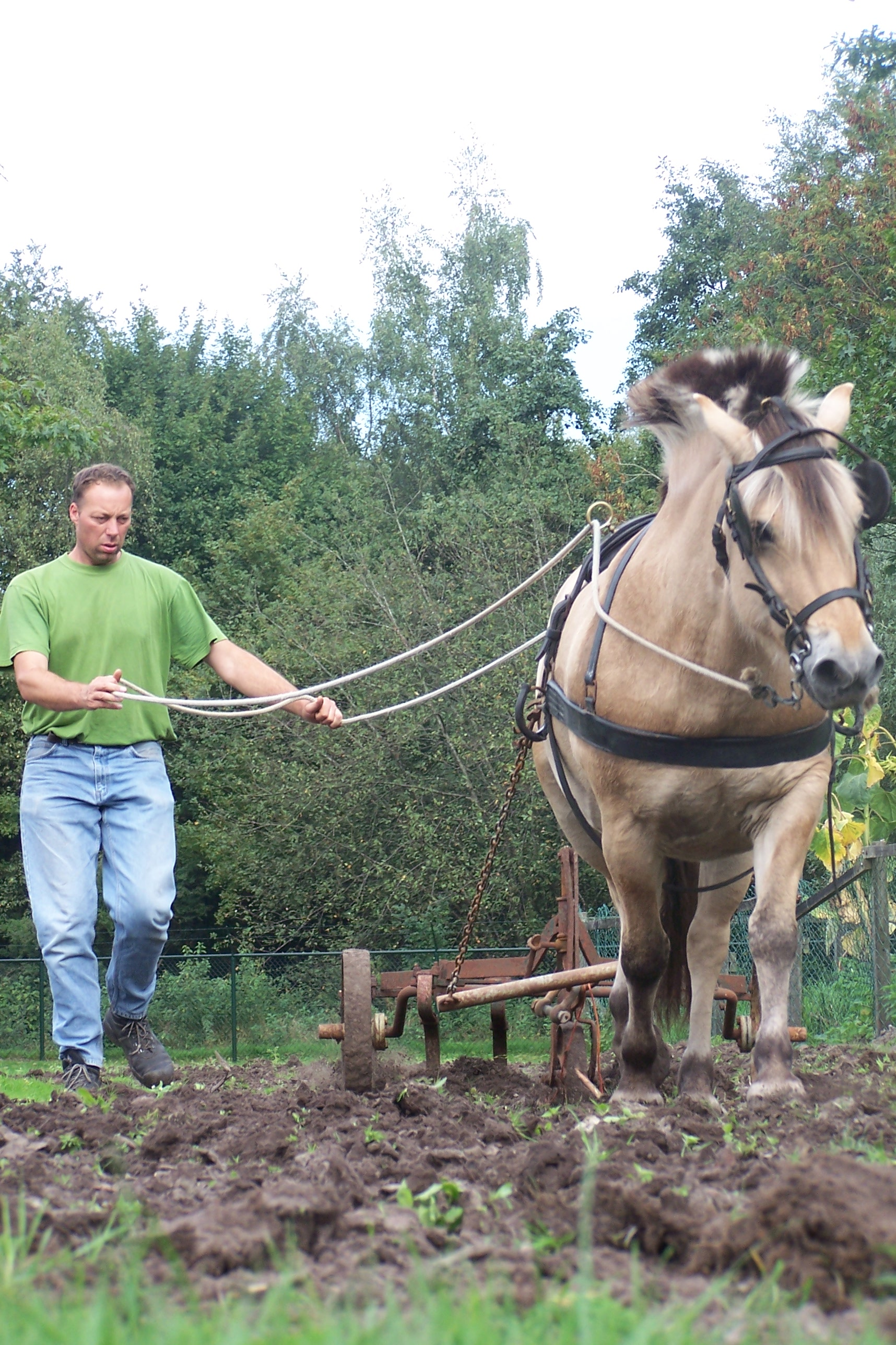
A "brown dun" (bay dun or brunblakk) mare working

The breed standard recognises five colours. 90% of all the horses are "brown dun" (the colour called "bay dun" in other breeds). The remaining 10% are either "red dun", "grey" (less often "grey dun", the colour known as mouse dun in other breeds), or two colours reflecting the influence of the cream gene: "white dun" (or "uls dun") and "yellow dun". The breed association encourages preservation of all colours. The dun colour variations can be subtle and hard to distinguish unless horses of different shades are standing side by side. The colour terms are also non-standard when compared to English terminology more commonly used to describe horse coat colours in other breeds. This difference appears to be based in part from being derived from Norwegian-language terms, which were set in 1922, and their English translations, which were made official in 1980. While these terms were set before equine coat colour genetics were fully understood, the variations do match up to modern genetic studies as variations of dun colour with the addition of other genetic factors.

- Brown dun (brunblakk) is the most common colour. The body colour is a pale yellow-brown, and can vary from cream to almost a light chestnut. The primitive markings, as well as the midtstol and halefjær, are black or dark brown. The remainder of the mane and tail is usually cream or white, though they may be darker on darker individuals. The colour is genetically bay diluted by the dun factor, called "dun", "bay dun" or "zebra dun" in other breeds.

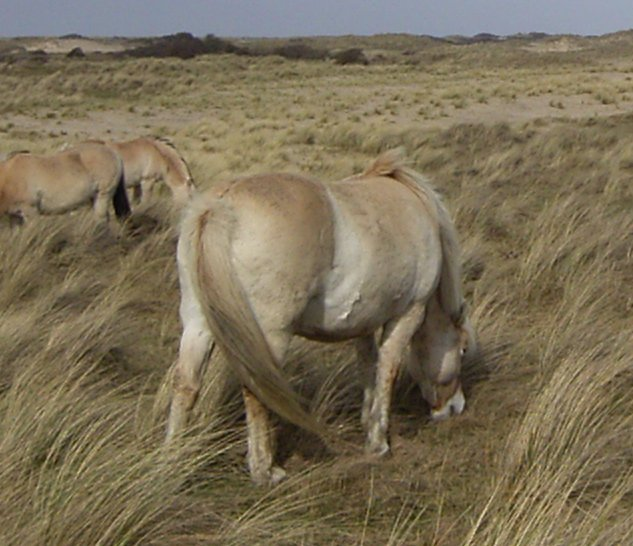
Red dun, showing lighter tail and body colour

- The red dun (rødblakk) has a pale golden body colour. Midtstol, halefjær and primitive markings are red or red-brownish, always darker than the colour of the body, but never black. The rest of the mane and tail is usually cream, though on some individuals the entire mane and tail may be white. Like red duns in other breeds, this shade is produced by the dun factor diluting a genetic chestnut base colour.

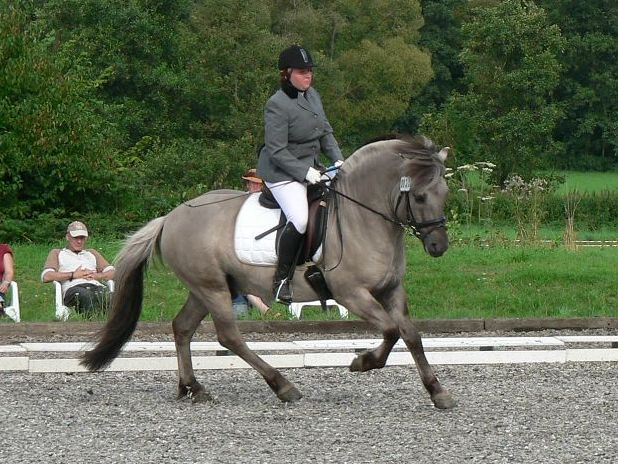
A "grey" form of dun called mouse dun in other breeds

- The "grey" (grå) has a grey body; the shade can vary from light silver to dark slate grey. The midtstol, halefjær and primitive markings are dark grey or black. The remainder of the mane, tail and forelock are a lighter grey than the body colour, and can be very pale. Though the term used in the breed standard for this colour is grey, it is actually a form of dun and not a true genetic grey. The term grey and even grey dun are misnomers, as the Fjord gene pool does not carry the greying gene. The term used for this colour in other breeds and by geneticists is mouse dun or blue dun. As in other breeds, the "grey" body colour is produced by the dun factor diluting a genetic black base colour. The term grey dun or gråblakk is sometimes used to describe this colour, but among Fjord owners, that terminology is considered incorrect even if more consistent. Had English-speaking Fjord breeders used the same naming conventions as for their breed's other shades, the colour could genetically be called a "black dun," but this did not happen.
- The white dun or uls dun (ulsblakk) has a cream body colour. The midtstol, halefjær and primitive markings are black or off-black. The rest of the mane and tail are lighter than the body colour. The colouration is genetically a bay-based dun further diluted by a single allele of the cream gene, what is sometimes called a "buckskin dun" in other settings.
- The yellow dun (gulblakk) is the rarest colour aside from kvit (see below). It is a red dun with an additional dilution factor that makes the body a light cream colour. This also due to the cream gene. The forelock, mane and tail can be completely white, and the primitive markings can be indistinct.
- White (kvit): Along with the recognised five shades of dun, two cream dilution alleles (C^{Cr}) on any other colour results in a horse with a light cream coat colour and blue eyes. This colour is called kvit ('white') in Norwegian, and is known as cremello, perlino or smoky cream in other breeds. A dun with double cream dilution will have faint or indistinguishable primitive markings. In the Fjord, kvit was traditionally considered undesirable, and thus is a very rare colour in the breed due to intentional selection against it. Nonetheless, it is a normal colour within the gene pool, as the nature of cream genetics statistically will result in the occasional kvit horse any time two horses that both carry a single copy of the cream dilution are mated, such as an ulsblakk and/or a gulblakk.

== Breed history ==
The Fjord is one of the world's oldest and purest breeds. Horses were known to exist in Norway at the end of the last ice age. It is believed that its ancestors migrated to Norway and were domesticated over 4000 years ago. Archaeological excavations at Viking burial sites suggest that horses of this type have been selectively bred for at least 2000 years. The horses were used by the Vikings as war mounts, and have been used for hundreds of years as farm animals in western Norway. Even as late as World War II, they were useful for work in mountainous terrain. Its strength, durability and thick coat fare well in the rough winters of Norway.

The breed has a long history of pure breeding without cross-breeding from other sources.

The Norwegian Fjordhorse Center (Norsk Fjordhest Senter) is the national resource center of the Fjord Horse breed in Norway, established in 1989 and owned by the Norwegian Fjord Horse Association. Its main goal is to promote the breeding and use of the horses. The center holds an annual event in Nordfjordeid during which stallions are evaluated against the breed standard and receive grades for conformation and movement.

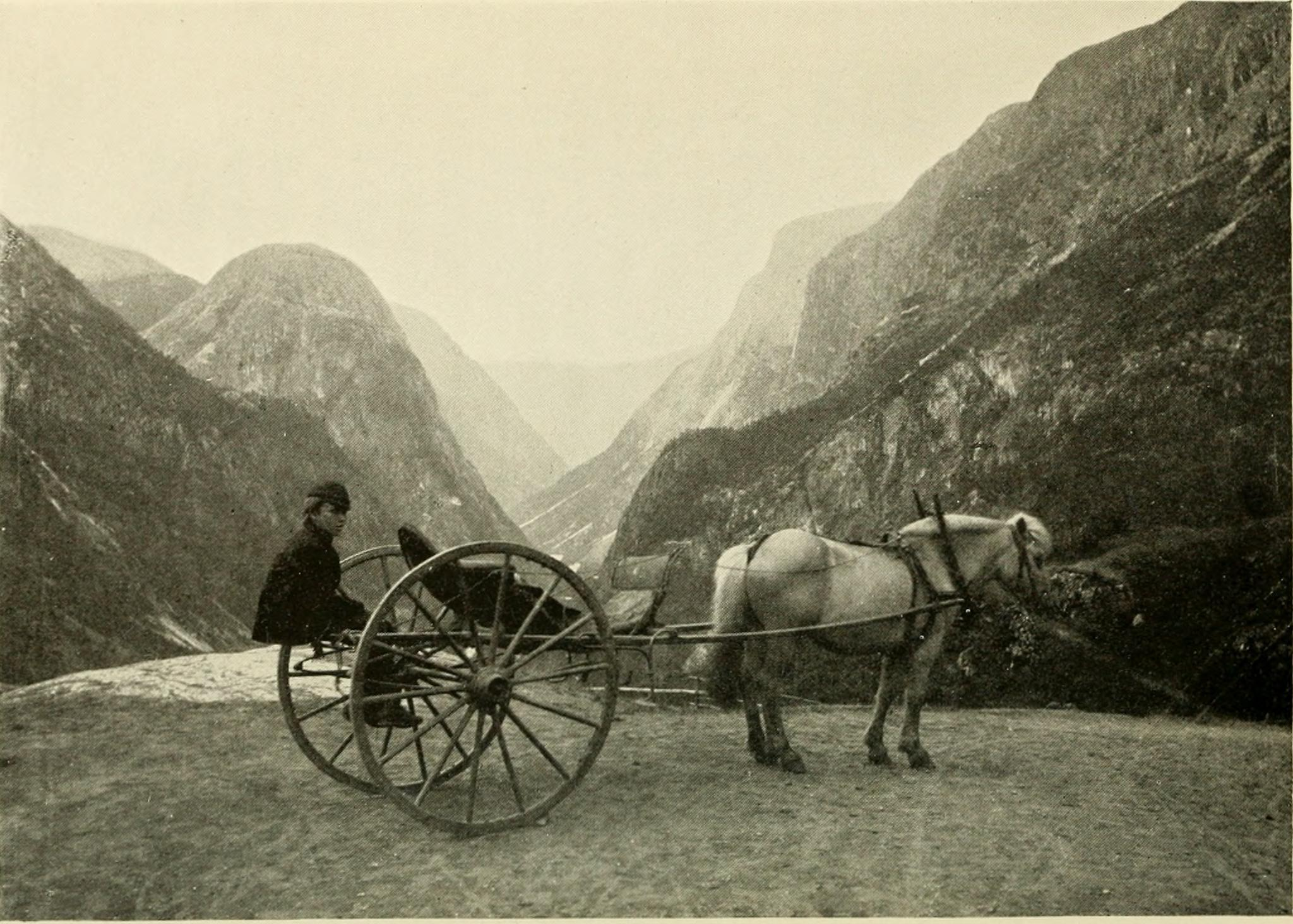
Fjord horse and cariole (1907)

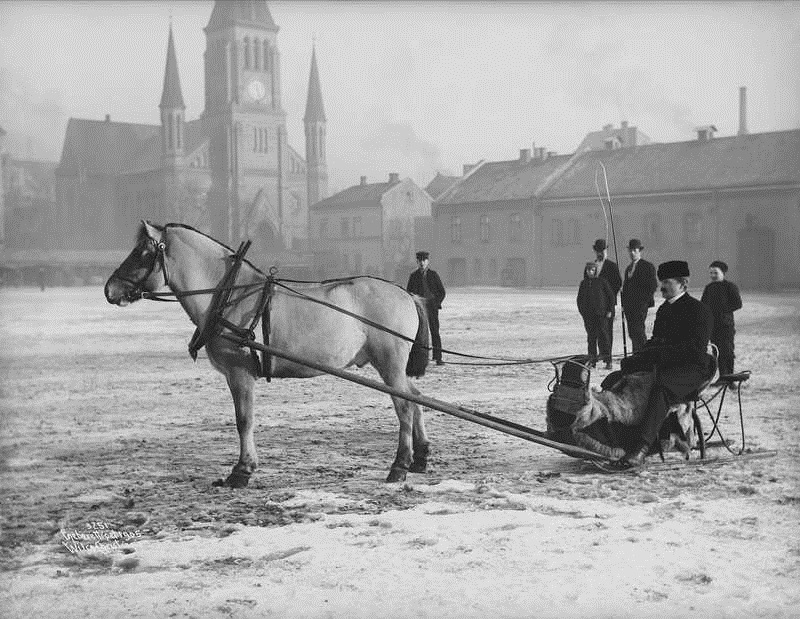
Sleigh in Oslo (1904)

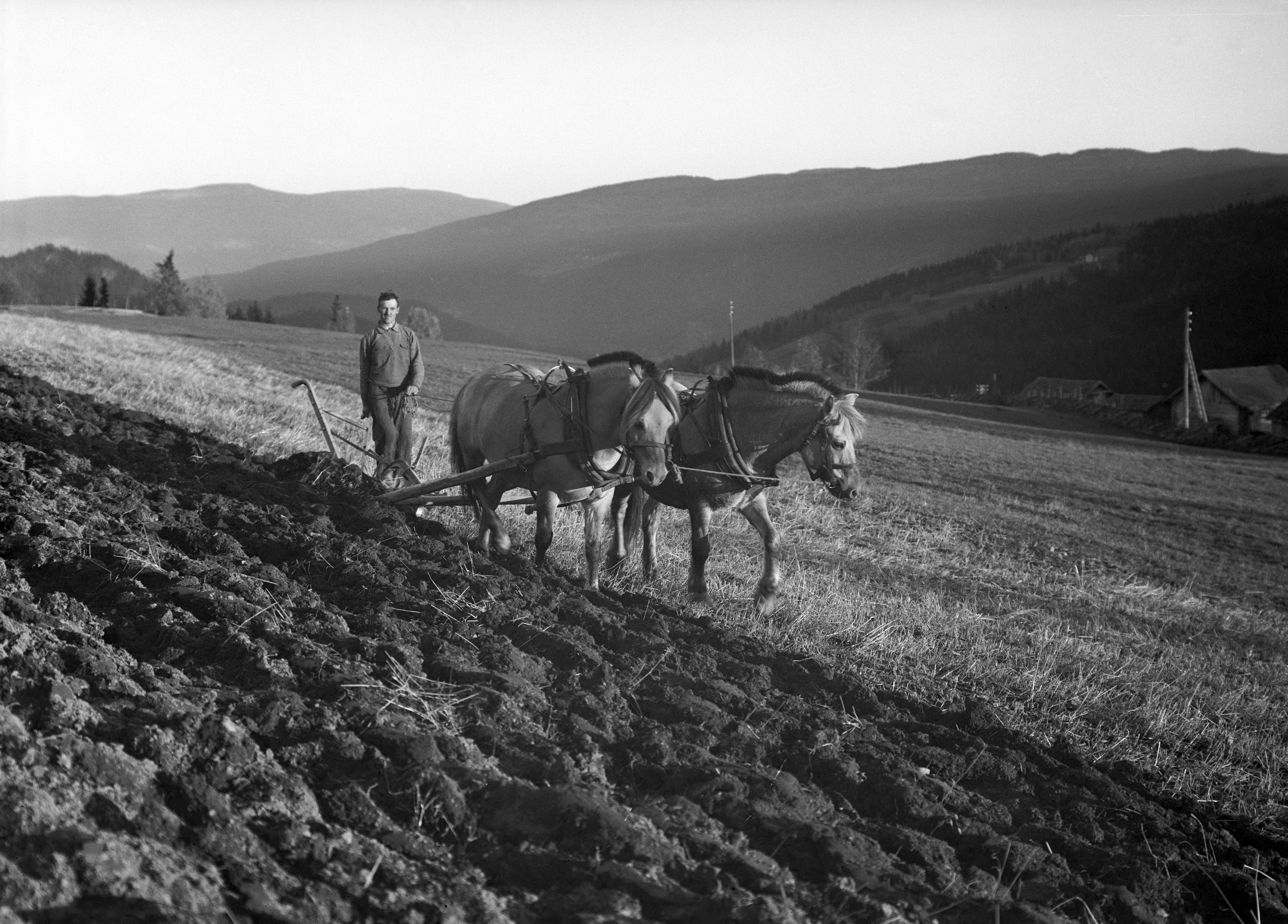
Ploughing with Fjords (mid-1900s)

Coat of arms of Gloppen Municipality

Coat of arms of Eid Municipality

== Use ==
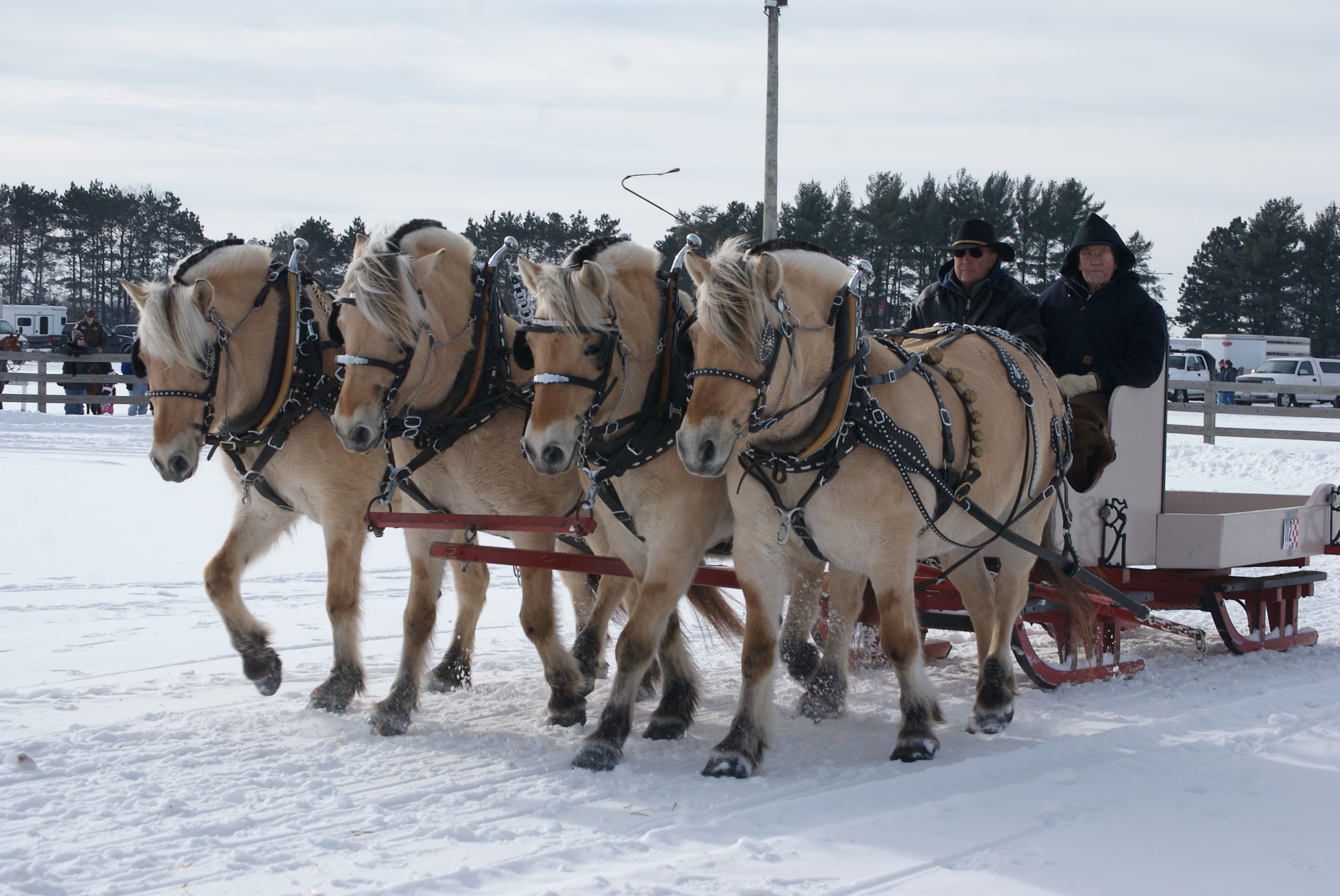
Team in harness

The Fjord is strong enough for heavy work, such as ploughing fields or hauling wood, yet light and agile enough to be a good riding and driving horse. It is also sure-footed in the mountains. It is common at Norwegian riding and therapeutic schools, as its generally mild temperament and small size make it suitable for children and disabled individuals. It is considered a good harness horse, and is commonly used in competition and in tourist transport.

== See also ==
- Faroe pony
- Icelandic horse
- Henson horse
