= Smoky black =

Horse coat color

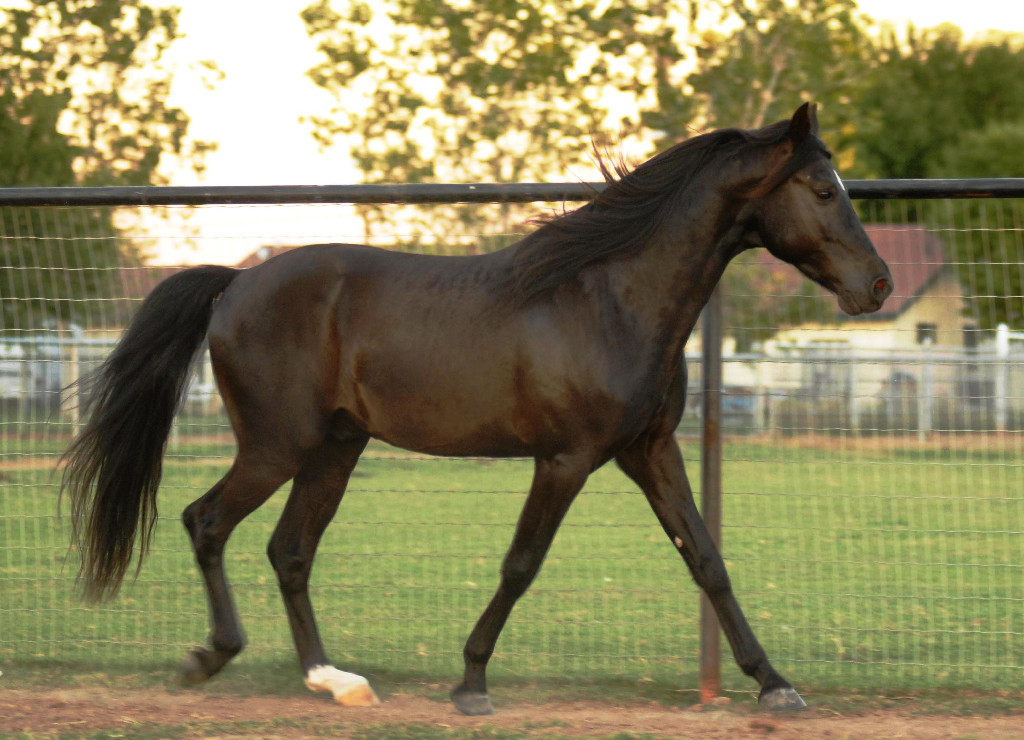
A smoky black Missouri Fox Trotter horse, with typical "off-black" impression.

Smoky black or just smoky is a coat color of horses which appears dark brown to deep black in color. Smoky black horses have a black base color with a heterozygous (single copy) cream gene. Therefore, smoky black may be found in horse populations that have other cream-based colors such as palomino, buckskin, perlino, cremello and smoky cream. All smoky blacks must have at least one parent with the cream gene, and a smoky black can only be verified through DNA testing or parentage. Smoky black has been mistaken for black, dark bay or brown, grullo or even liver chestnut.

A single copy of the cream gene can have a subtle effect on the color of an otherwise black horse. On average, smoky black horses tend to be slightly lighter in color than black horses. However, this cannot be used to positively identify an individual horse as black or smoky black, as too much variation comes from other sources. An individual black horse may well be a lighter shade than an individual smoky black horse, even if the reverse is more common. Other factors that can influence the shade of black and smoky black horses include sun fading and nutrition.

Two copies of the cream gene on a black base coat produce a smoky cream, a cream-colored horse visually similar to perlino or cremello. These colors can be distinguished through DNA testing.

== Appearance ==
Smoky black horses can range from a pure black color to a lighter color resembling bay. The palest can be mistaken for dull bays or liver chestnuts, especially if exposed to the elements. Bleaching due to the elements means that the legs retain their color better, and can take on an appearance of having dark points like a bay horse.

While it superficially resembles other coat colors, experienced horse persons often detect something "off" about the coat of an adult smoky black. The darkest shades among smoky blacks are almost indistinguishable from true black but for a slightly burnished look often chalked up to sun bleaching. The palest can be mistaken for dull bays or liver chestnuts, especially if exposed to the elements. Smoky black coats tend to react strongly to sun and sweat, and many smoky blacks turn to a chocolate color with particularly reddish tips of the manes and tails. Bleaching due to the elements means that the legs retain their color better, and can take on an appearance of having dark points like a bay horse. Smoky blacks, however, will lack rich red tones in the coat, instead favoring chocolate and orange tones.

Smoky black horses, like other horses with a single copy of cream, often have slightly lighter eyes and skin than non-cream horses. Their eye color may be amber even at adulthood. However, it is sometimes difficult to distinguish an amber-brown eye from an ordinary dark brown eye unless there are other horses available for direct comparison.

Like black foals, smoky black foals are typically quite silvery, and may be mistaken for grullos, especially when born with primitive markings. Smoky black foals are sometimes born with reddish tufts of hair in their ears, again like black foals.

== Identification ==
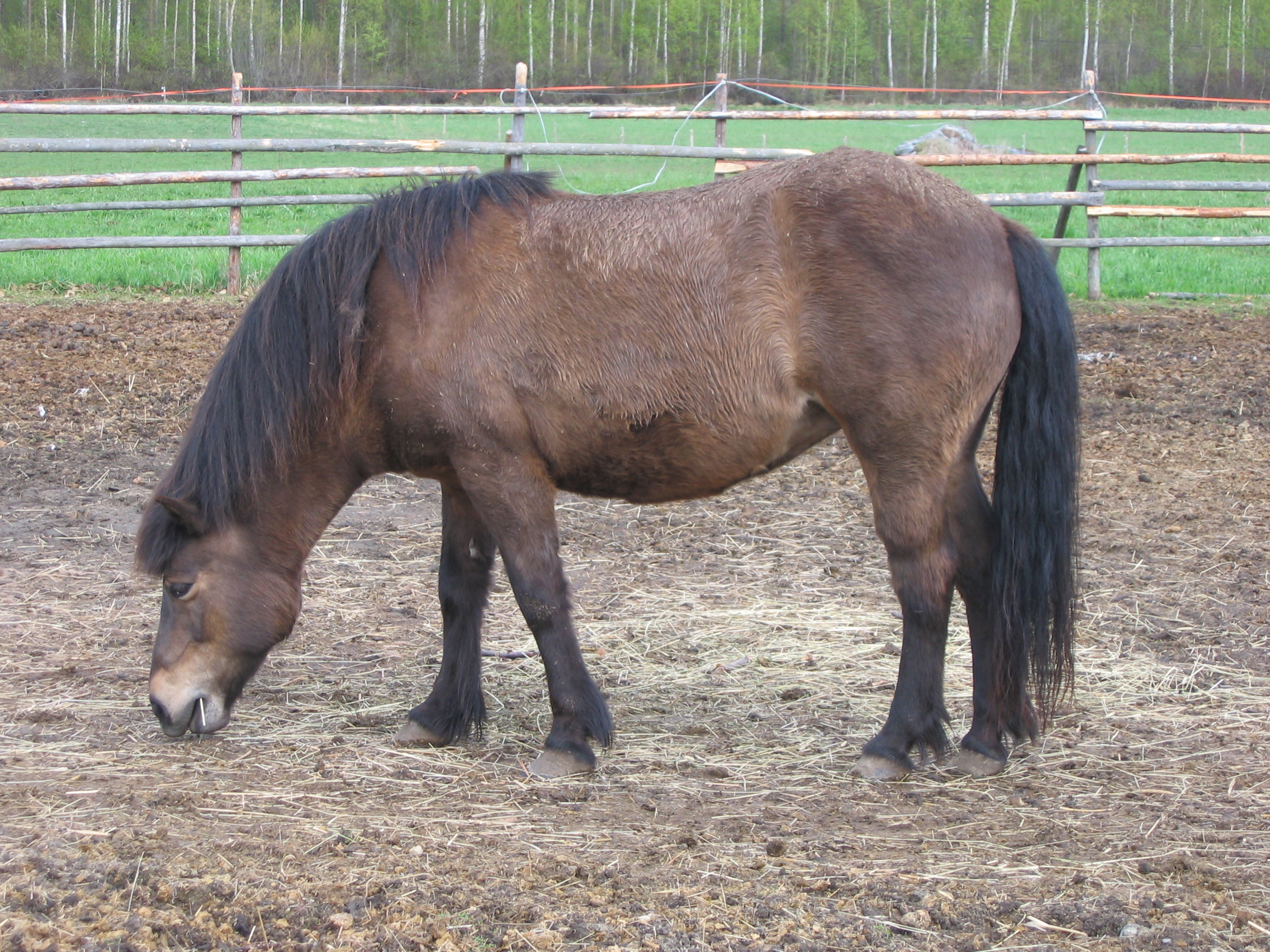
A sun-bleached smoky black Icelandic horse, which has the superficial appearance of a dark bay.

There is no reliable way to be certain that a horse is smoky black through purely visual identification, because it can so closely resemble black or bay.

Although the single copy of cream can slightly affect the shade of black, this subtle effect cannot be used to confirm a horse as either black or smoky black. For an analogy, consider humans. Men are on average taller than women, and yet if you only know someone's height, that does not tell you their gender.

Some genetically palomino horses may be such a dark shade that they could be mistaken for smoky black.

=== By genetic test ===
A smoky black horse will test as having one copy of the cream gene, two copies of the recessive a allele at agouti, and one or two copies of the dominant E allele at extension.

=== By parentage ===
Smoky black horses must always have at least one parent with the cream dilute allele and at least one parent with the E allele of extension. Additionally, both parents must have at least one copy of the a allele of agouti. If these conditions are not met, the horse is definitely not smoky black.

If one parent is a double dilute cream (such as cremello, perlino, or smoky black), then absent mutations the foal is guaranteed to inherit at least one copy of the cream gene. In this case, the horse is definitely not black and must be palomino, buckskin, smoky black, or another cream-based color.

== Glóbrúnn ==
Among Icelandic horses, some horses with the genetics expected of smoky black are a noticeably lighter color, a shade of reddish-brown called "glóbrúnn" or "muskóttur". It is believed this color is caused by one or more additional genetic modifiers that change the appearance when cream is also present.

== Smoky black mimics ==
- Dark bay: When smoky blacks fade from exposure to the elements, their legs usually retain their color, giving them the appearance of a bay or brown horse with black points. However, the brown coat of a bleached smoky black recalls orange rather than red or mahogany.
- Black: A black horse without cream may still develop a sun-bleached coat, usually due to issues related to management and nutrition, though in some cases there may also be genetic factors contributing. A smoky black looks very similar to a sun-bleached black, and often only pedigree analysis or genetic testing can distinguish between the two.
- Seal brown: The just off-black coat color of true seal browns can sometimes be misidentified as smoky black, or vice versa.
- Liver chestnut: The palest, most evenly bleached smoky blacks may mimic the darkest shades of chestnut. Chestnuts will usually show reddish tones around the fetlocks. Smoky blacks usually have uniformly black legs. Furthermore, most chestnuts do not possess amber eyes.
- Classic champagne: Paler smoky blacks with amber eyes may be confused with the activity of champagne on a black coat. Champagne horses have pinkish, freckled skin and green, hazel or amber eyes, as opposed to the dark skin and brown or amber eyes of a smoky black.
- Grullo: Grullo is the action of the dun gene on black. Typically, grullo coats have cool slate hues as opposed to warm orange-brown tones. Furthermore, grullos have dun characteristics such as bold dorsal stripes and leg bars.

== See also ==
- Cream gene
- Dilution gene
- Smoky cream
