= Primitive markings =

Hair coloration in some equine

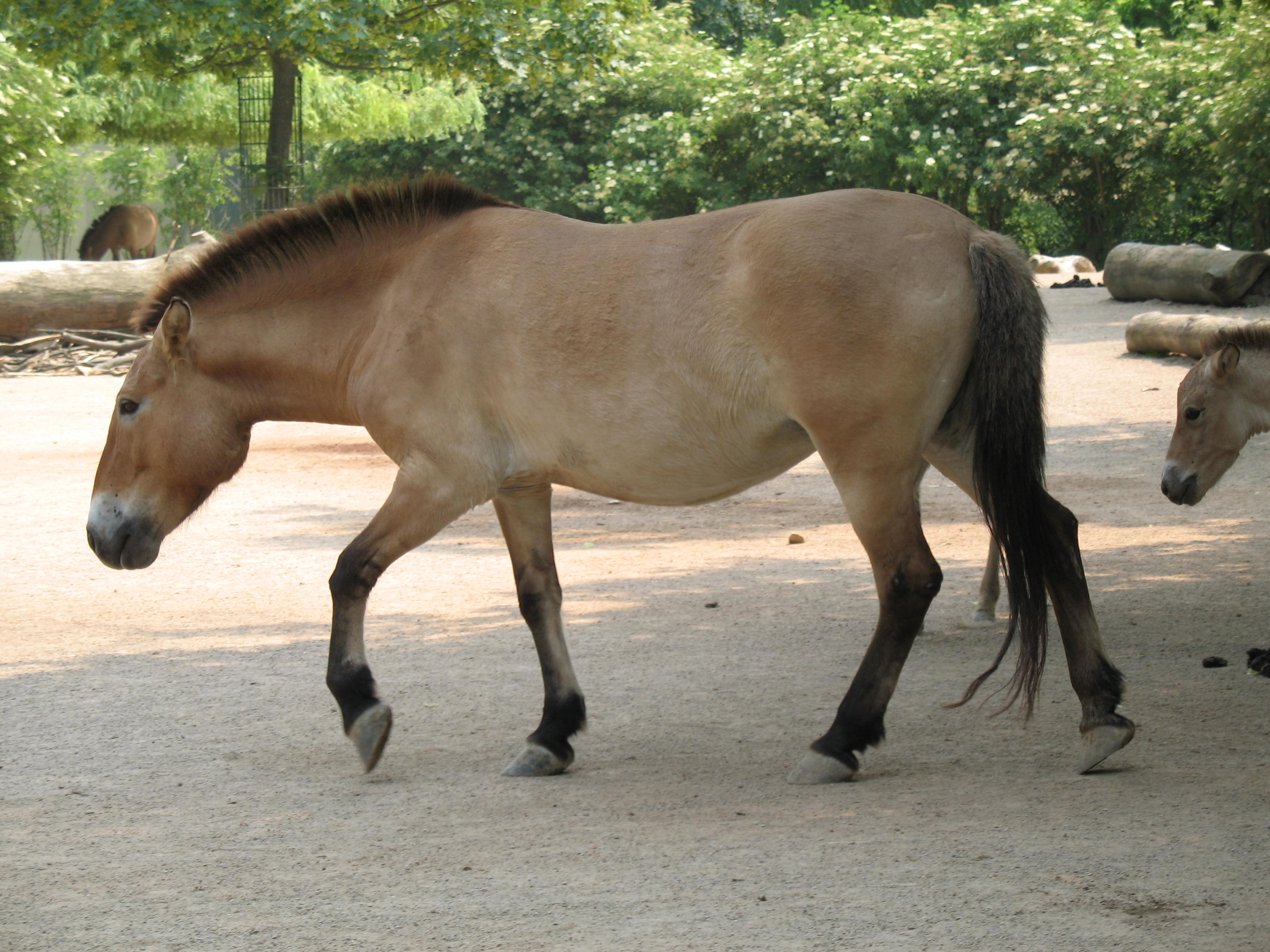
Przewalski's horse is thought to be similar in appearance to ancestors of today's domestic horses.

Primitive markings are a group of hair coat markings and qualities seen in several equine species, including horses, donkeys, and asses. In horses, they are associated with primitive breeds, though not limited to such breeds. The markings are particularly associated with the dun coat color family. All dun horses possess at least the dorsal stripe, but the presence of the other primitive markings varies. Other common markings may include horizontal striping on the legs, transverse striping across the shoulders, and lighter guard hairs along the edges of a dark mane and tail.

== Origin ==
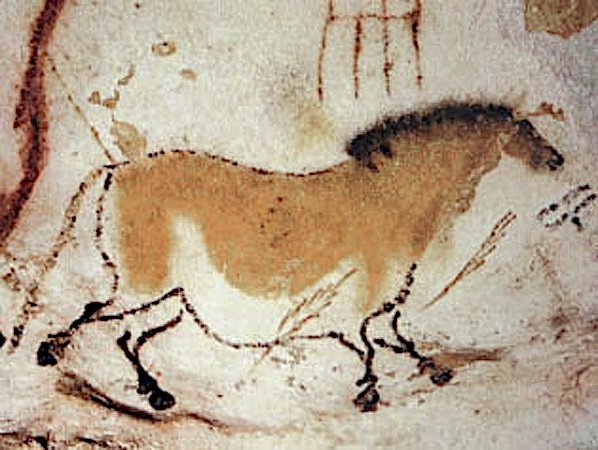
A cave painting of a wild horse, Lascaux

The dun coat and attendant primitive or "dun factor" markings reflect the wild type coat and are observed in all equine species. Some cave paintings depict horses as being dun and with the primitive markings. The Przewalski's horse is dun-colored with primitive markings. So, too, are horse breeds such as the Konik and the Heck horse, "bred back" to resemble the now-extinct tarpan, many of which are grullo or mouse dun in color.

Every dun horse has a dorsal stripe, and some dun horses also have additional primitive markings. Some non-dun horses may also show primitive markings, namely newborn foals and horses with the non-dun 1 gene. Primitive markings in horses are an example of atavism: preservation of or reversion to ancestral type. While primitive markings are closely linked with the dun coat colors, the variations of expression and presence in non-dun horses suggest that the markings themselves may be governed by a separate genetic mechanism.

== Dorsal stripe ==
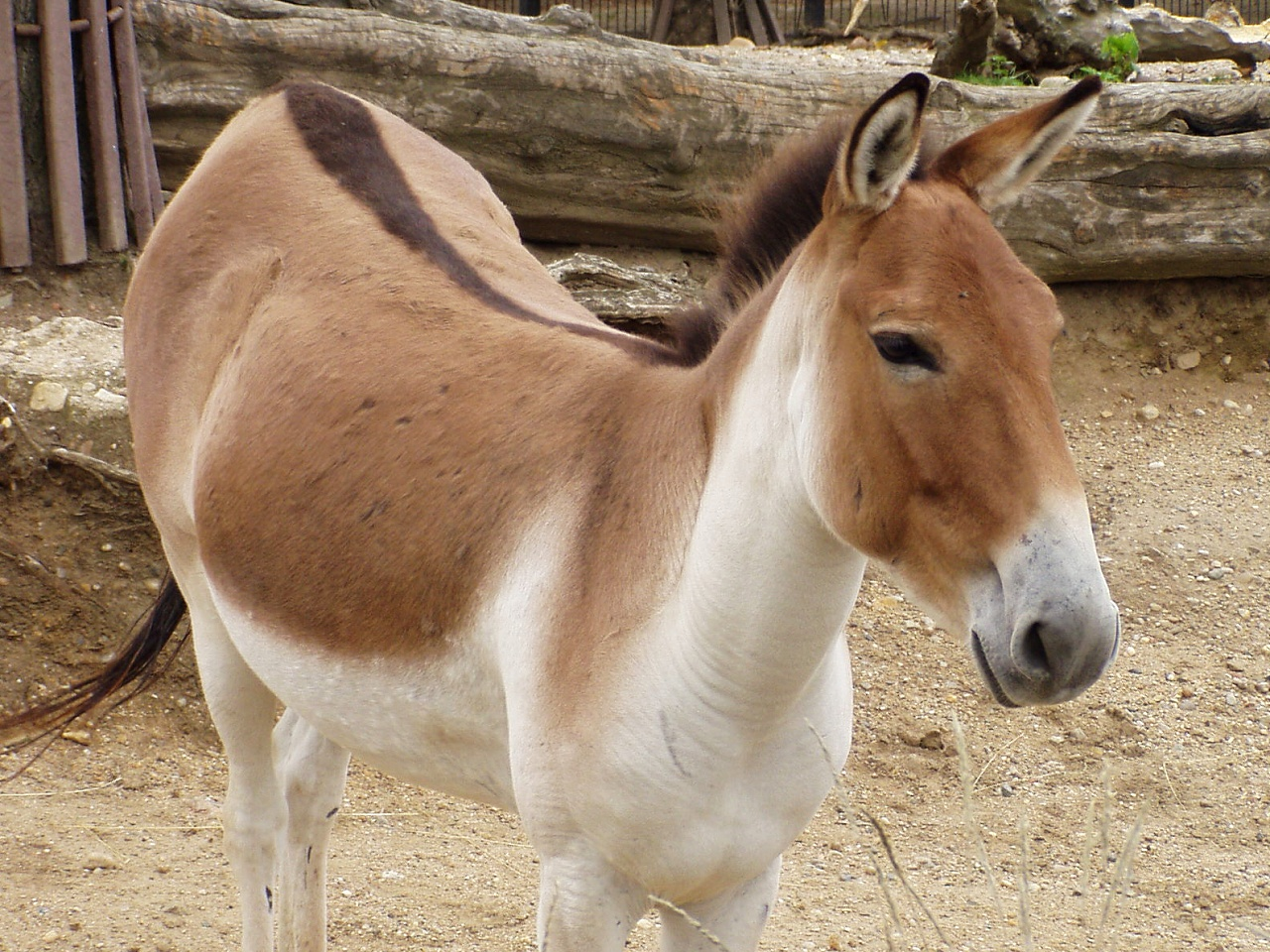
Kiangs have bold dorsal stripes.

Equids other than horses also exhibit a distinct dorsal stripe. Among domesticated donkeys, most have a black dorsal stripe, though it can be difficult to see on melanistic individuals. In the African wild ass, the dorsal stripe is thin but distinct and black. In Przewalski's horse, the dorsal stripe is usually dark brown, while it is black in the bred-back tarpan. In the plains zebra, the dorsal stripe is narrow and edged by white, while in Grevy's zebra, it is quite bold. The dorsal stripes of the onager and kiang are dark brown and especially vivid.

The dorsal stripe reflects the original coat color of the horse. Those on bay duns may be black or reddish, while those on red duns are distinctly red. Dorsal stripes on dun horses with the cream gene seem unaffected by cream: smoky black-duns ("smoky grullas"), buckskin-duns ("dunskins"), and palomino-duns ("dunalinos") have black, brown, or red dorsal stripes, as well.

== Leg bars and markings ==
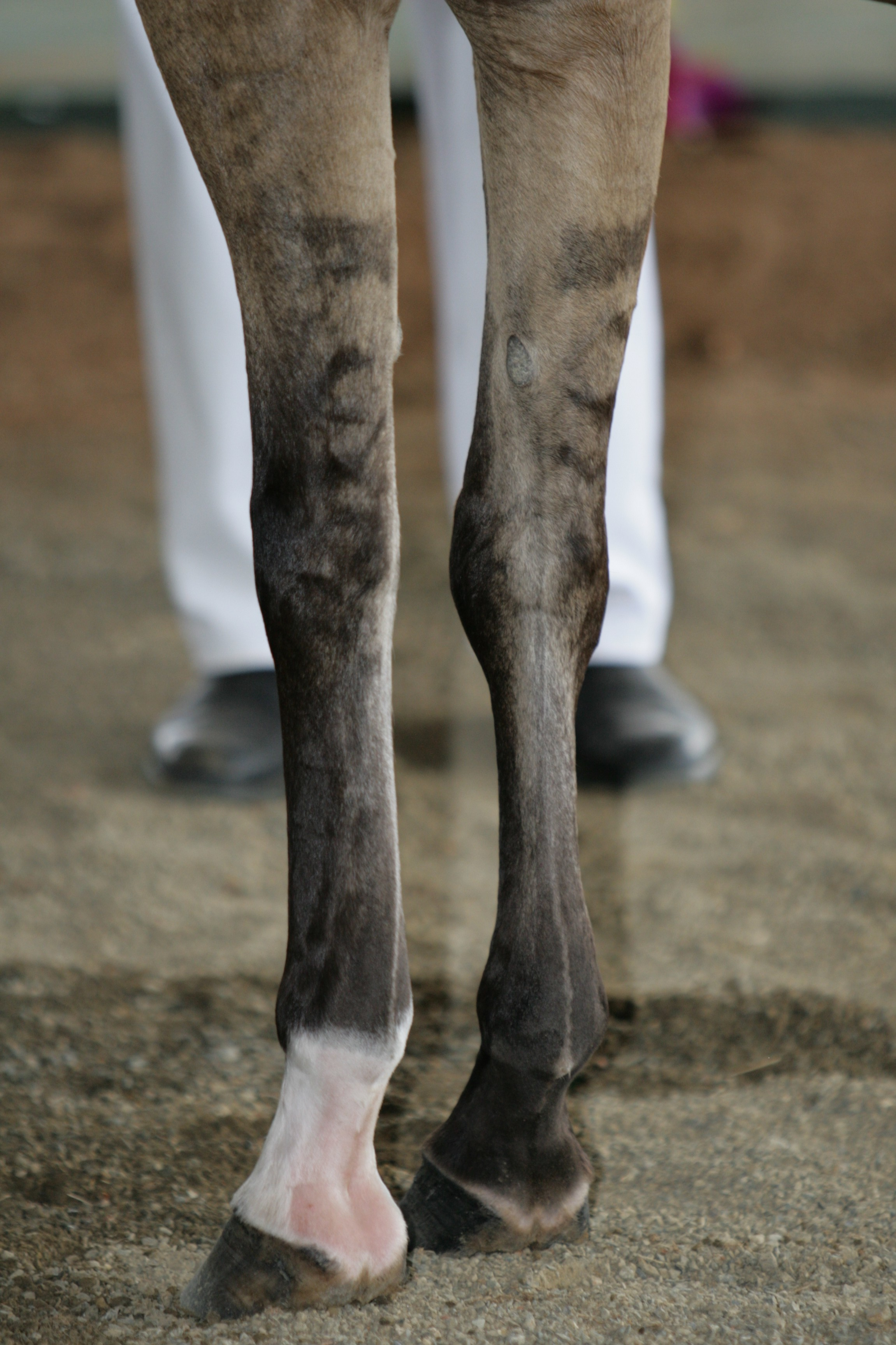
Leg bars and "zippers": This horse's legs have been shaved.

Also called zebra bars, tiger stripes, or garters, leg bars are the most common accessory to the dorsal stripe. Leg bars are most commonly seen on or above the knees and hocks, and reflect the underlying coat color. Leg bars on bay duns are black within the points, and reddish above them.

Leg bars are prominent on Grevy's zebras and mountain zebras, and African wild asses also have well-defined black leg bars below the forearm and gaskin on a white or pale background. However, as in horses, expression of leg bars seems to vary widely among donkeys, plains zebras, and Przewalski's horses, while they appear very seldom or not at all in onagers and kiangs.

Leg markings may also take the form of blotches, patches, marbling, mottling, or spotting.

One classical genetics study concluded that stripes on the front legs seem to follow an autosomal dominant mode of inheritance.

== Shoulder stripe ==
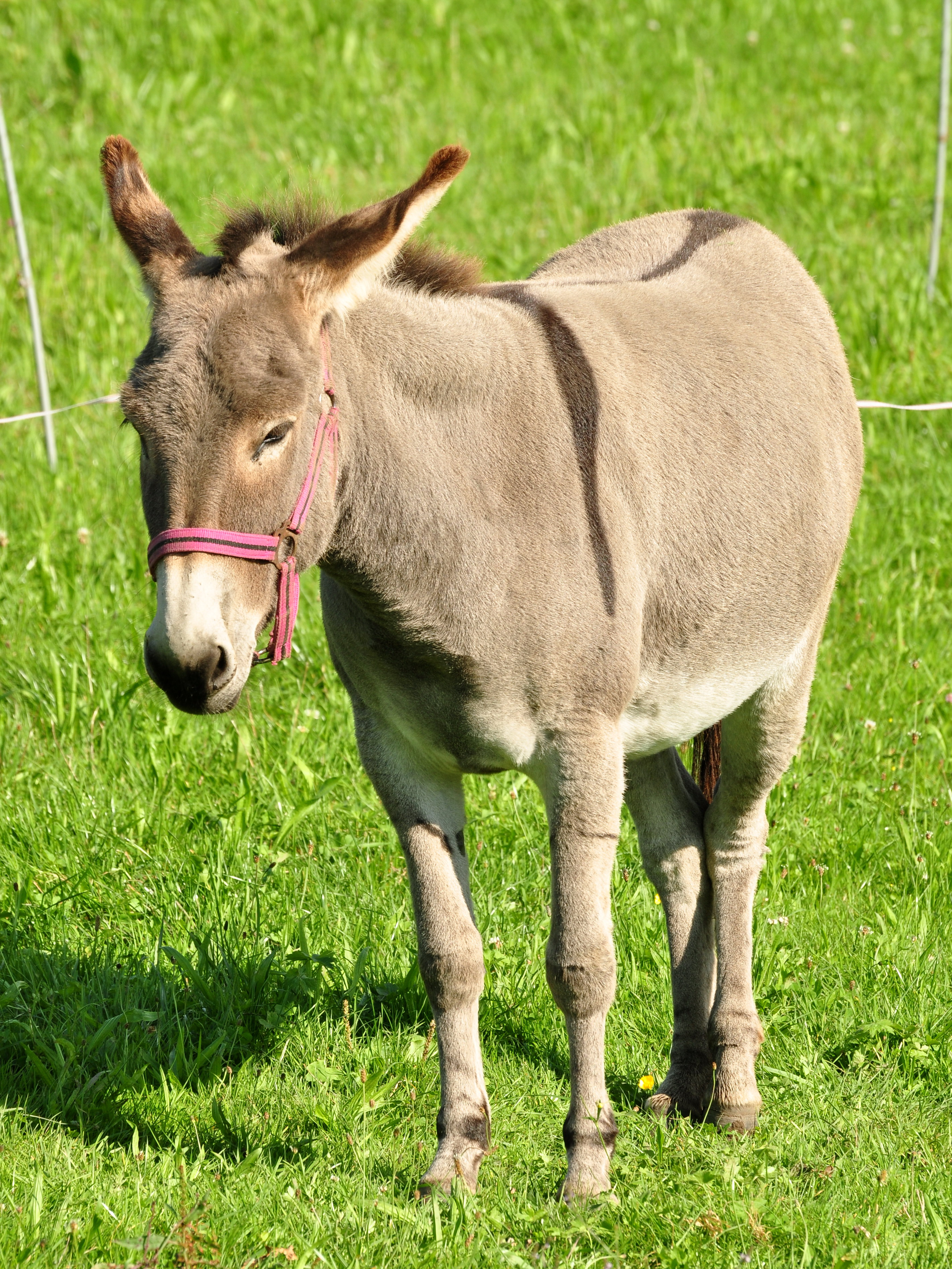
Transverse shoulder stripes are common on asses.

The shoulder stripe is a transverse or "vertical" marking that usually crosses the withers and extends down the shoulders. Donkeys are known for their distinct shoulder stripe, which, when combined with the dorsal stripe, is sometimes called a "cross". It is more marked in breeds closest to the wild African ancestors of the domestic donkey. Indistinct or poorly defined markings in these regions are often called neck or shoulder smudges, patches, or shadows. Especially large markings are called neck or shoulder capes. The kiang exhibits some shoulder smudging.

== Head markings ==
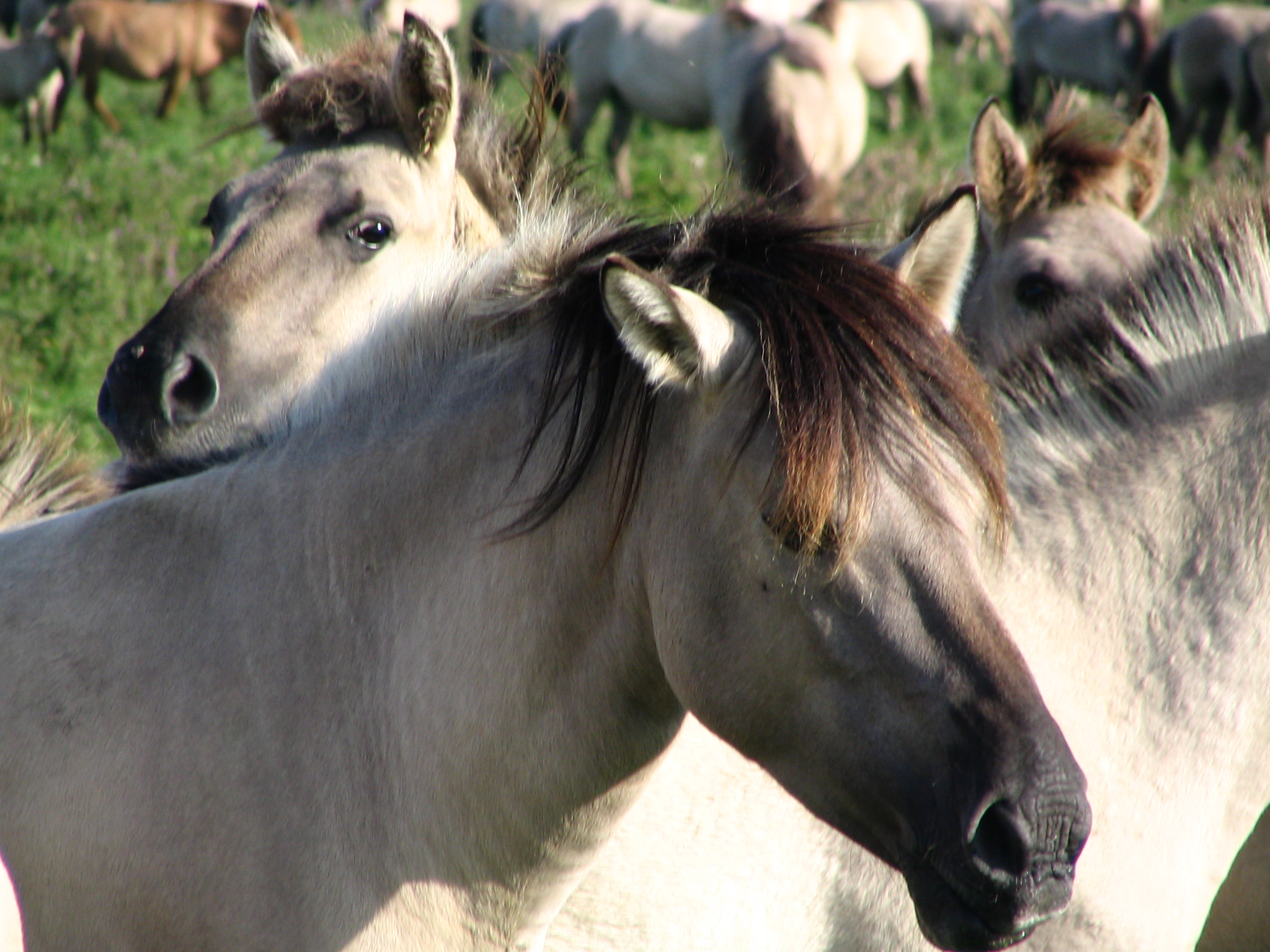
This Konik shows the dark face mask and frosted mane common to primitive horses.

Many primitive markings may occur on the animal's head.

- Cobwebbing, also called spiderwebbing, consists of fine, radial stripes on the forehead. Among other equids, cobwebbing is most apparent in zebras.
- Face masks are areas of darker hair on the lower half of the face. These are very common.
- Ear marks are dark markings on the ears, whether the marking involves only the rim, half the back of the ear, or distinct barring or striping on the back of the ear. These are seen almost universally throughout Equus.
- Ear tips are tiny white or paler tips on the ear.
- Eye spots are found around the eyes. They are quite rare, but may be across the eye, over it, or under it.

== Guard hairs ==
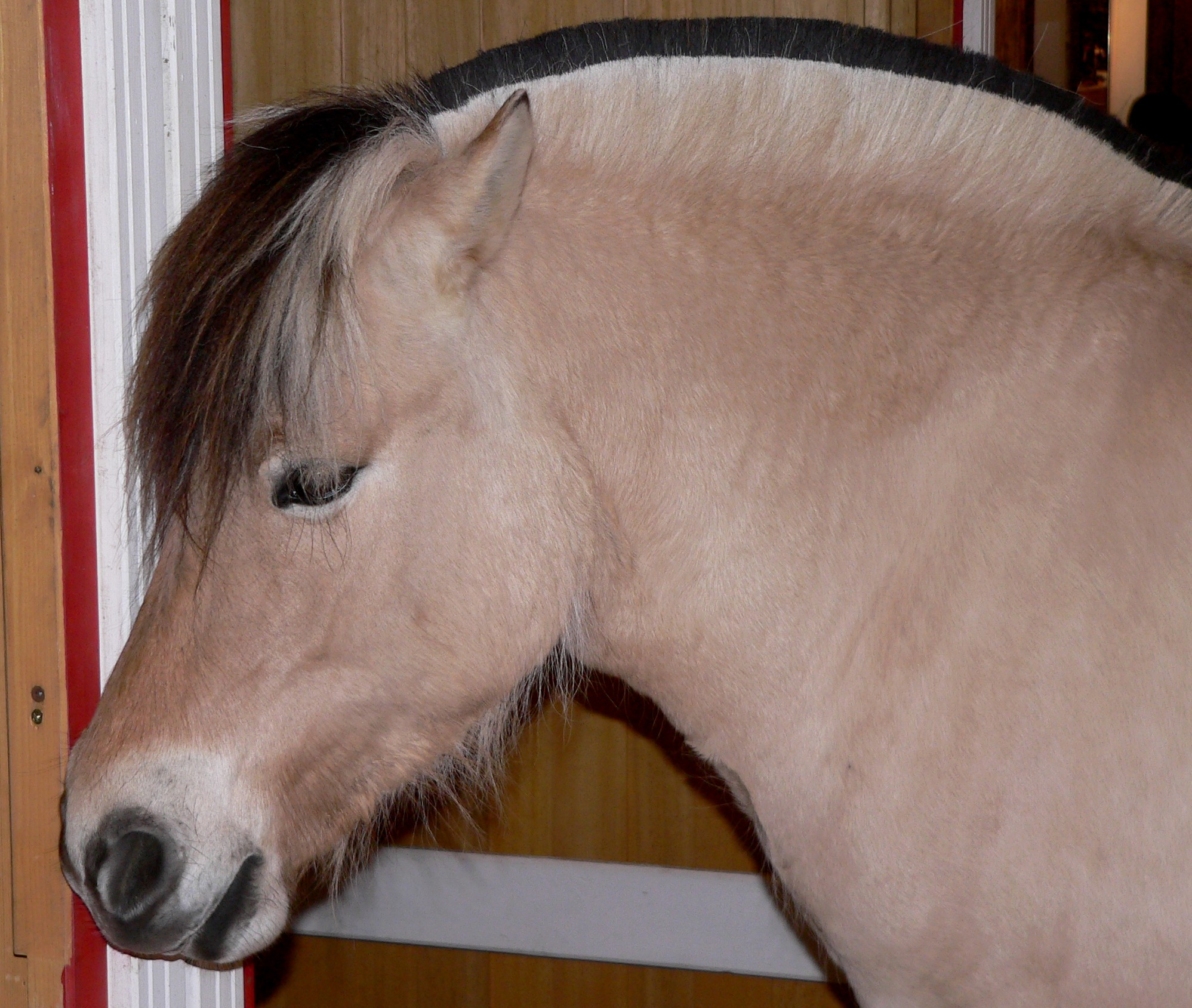
The long-roached manes of Fjords clearly show the light, outside primitive guard hairs.

The dorsal stripe runs through the mane and tail of a dun horse, so the center of the mane and tail are darker. The outer edges may be significantly lighter, even close to white. These paler hairs are seen at the base of the tail and on the edges of the mane. The presence of guard hairs may also be called "frosting". Such characteristics are very visible among the Fjord horses, which have their sandwich-patterned manes shaved short and upright. The presence of paler guard hairs on the mane and tail is seen throughout Equus.

== Other markings ==
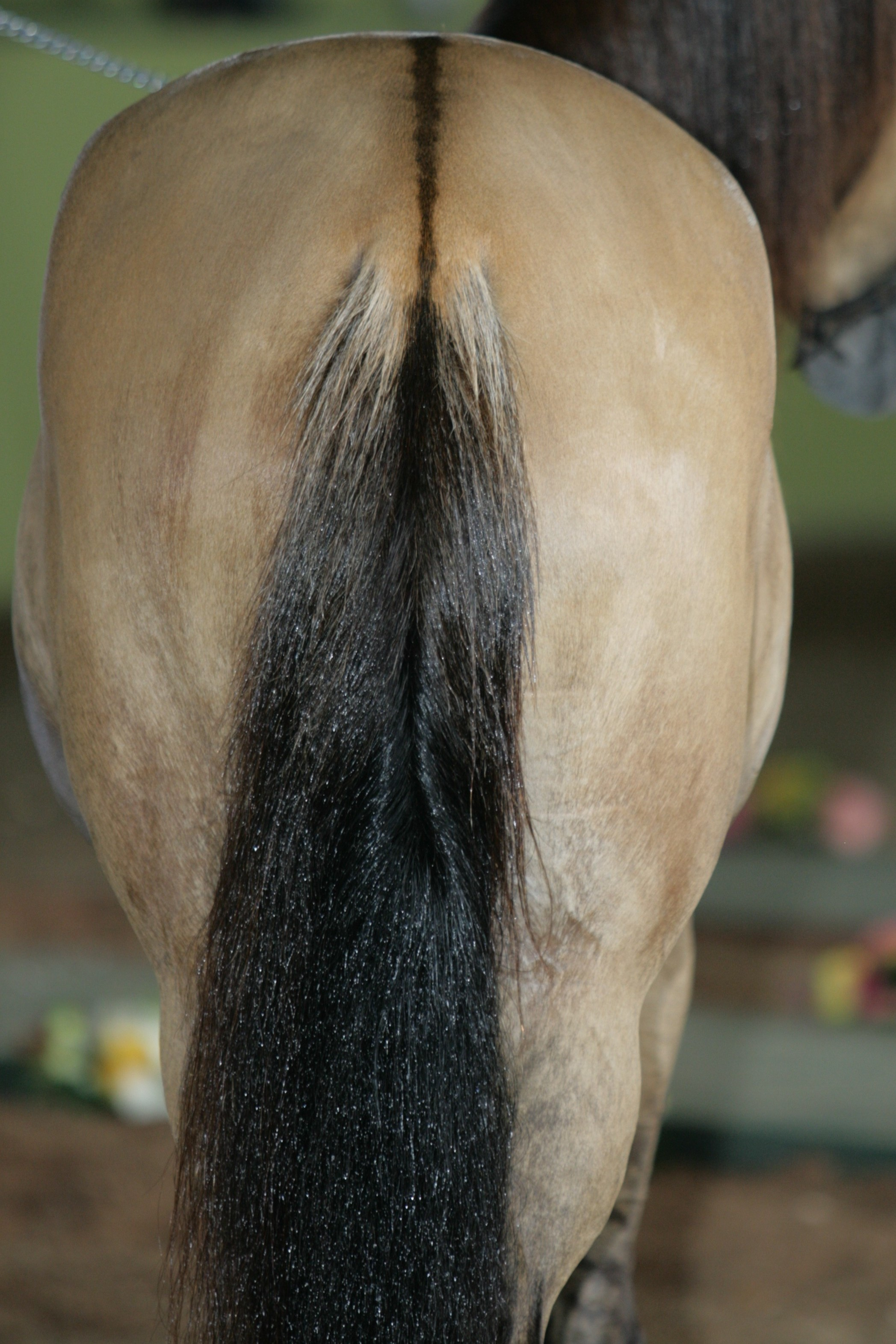
Dorsal stripe and pale guard hairs on the dock of a domestic horse

Less common primitive markings include vertically oriented markings which may be arranged as bars, fine striping, or smudges. Such markings include:

- Dorsal barbs are suggestions of vertical striping on either side of the dorsal stripe. They may be so closely placed that they resemble secondary dorsal stripes. Dorsal barbs are also called fishboning.
- Rib marks are extended, perhaps interrupted dorsal barbs. They are usually fine, faint stripes and may be responsible for some horses classified as brindle.
- A ventral stripe runs along the midline of the underbelly of the horse. They are usually wide and are uncommon.
- Zippers are lines of paler hairs running vertically along the back of the animal's leg, usually from the hoof to the knee. Because they consist of paler hairs and are found where horses often have feathering, zippers are considered by some to be guard hairs.
- Bider markings are only known in Przewalski's horses and native Mongolian horses from nearby. The bider is mostly symmetrical and found near the front of each shoulder, near the chest. The size of the bider ranges from a small dark spot to a large, webbed cape of darker skin and hair.

== Primitive markings in non-dun horses ==
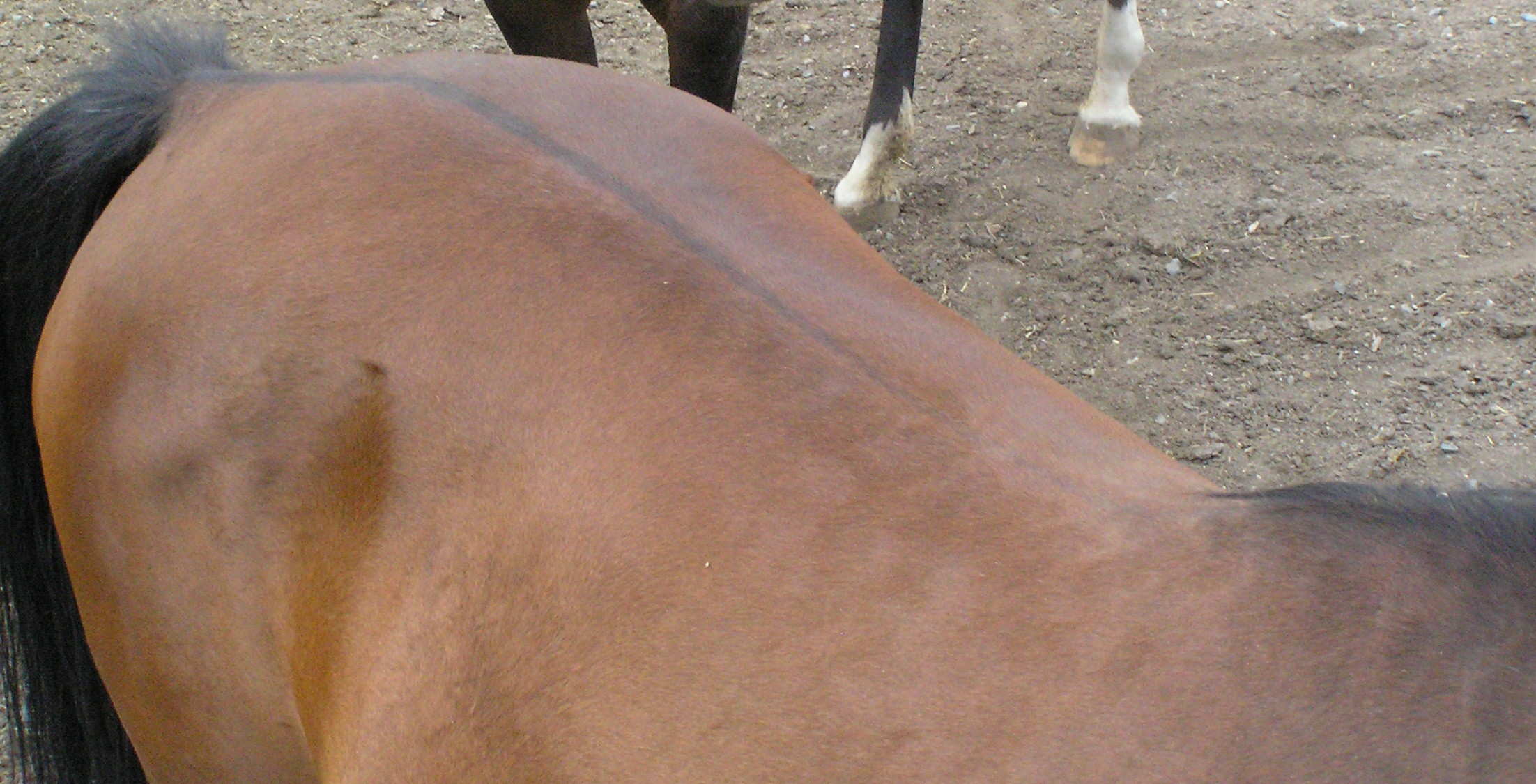
This horse's dorsal stripe is most likely caused by non-dun 1.

Less distinct primitive markings can also occur on non-dun horses, even in breeds which are not known to have any dun individuals. The most common primitive marking found is a dorsal stripe. Most non-dun horses do not have darker primitive markings, but some do. This is because there are two types of non-dun, called non-dun1 and non-dun2. Non-dun 1 removes the diluting effect of dun, but keeps the primitive markings, while non-dun 2 removes both the diluting effect and the primitive markings. The non-dun1 allele is over 40,000 years old, while non-dun2 is relatively recent, and is thought to have first appeared within the past several thousand years. Primitive markings on non-duns can be seasonal, visible only when the horse is shedding its coat.

Dorsal stripes and other primitive markings on non-dun horses used to be called "countershading" dorsals before their genetic cause was discovered at the dun locus. This is not to be confused with the camouflage mechanism of countershading.

=== Primitive markings in foals ===
Many foals, particularly if they are buckskin, smoky black, or black, are born with primitive markings such as dorsal stripes and leg bars that disappear after the foal coat sheds. Such horses are sometimes mistakenly registered as dun. This error seems particularly common in foals that turn gray.

== See also ==
- Horse markings
