= Grullo =

Color of horses in the dun family

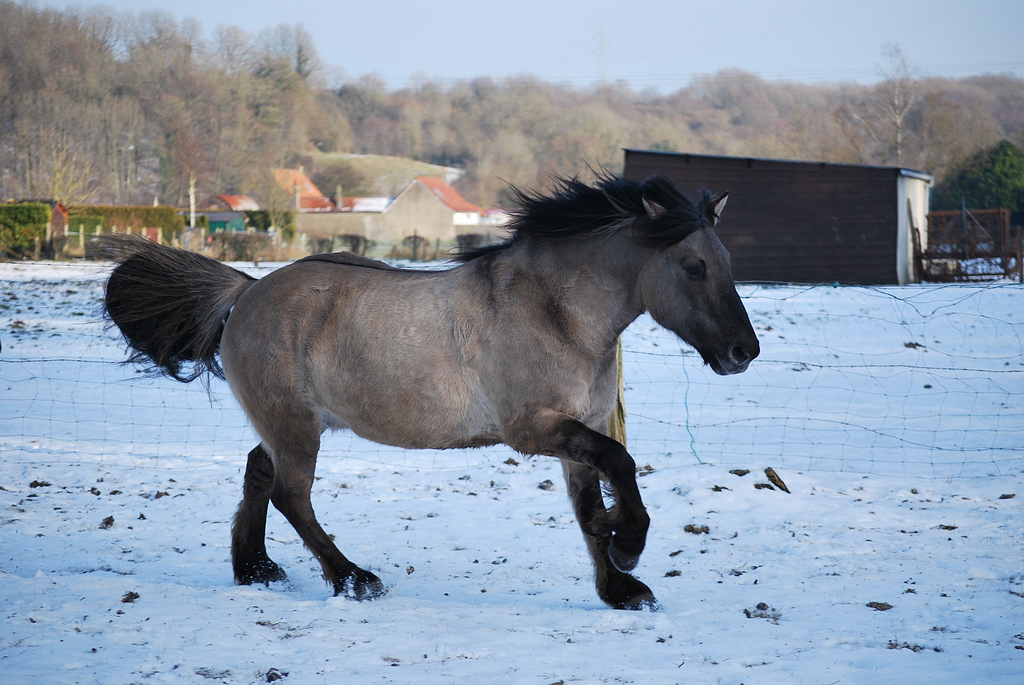
A grulla, like all duns, exhibits a lighter body coat than mane and tail color, clear primitive markings (a distinctive dorsal stripe, horizontal striping on the back of the forelegs, often a transverse stripe over the withers), and the dark "dun mask" on the face. Zebra stripes are visible on the left back leg. The dun gene also produces light guard hairs in the mane and the tail.

Grullo (/ˈɡruːjoʊ/ GROO-yoh) or grulla is a color of horses in the dun family, characterized by tan-gray or mouse-colored hairs on the body, often with shoulder and dorsal stripes and black barring on the lower legs. The genotype for grulla horses is a black base with dun dilution. In this coloration, each individual hair is mouse-colored, unlike a roan, which is composed of a mixture of dark and light hairs. The several shades of grulla are informally referred to with a variety of terms, including black dun, blue dun, slate grulla, silver grulla or light grulla, silver dun, or lobo dun. Silver grulla may also refer to a grulla horse with silver dapple, regardless of shade.

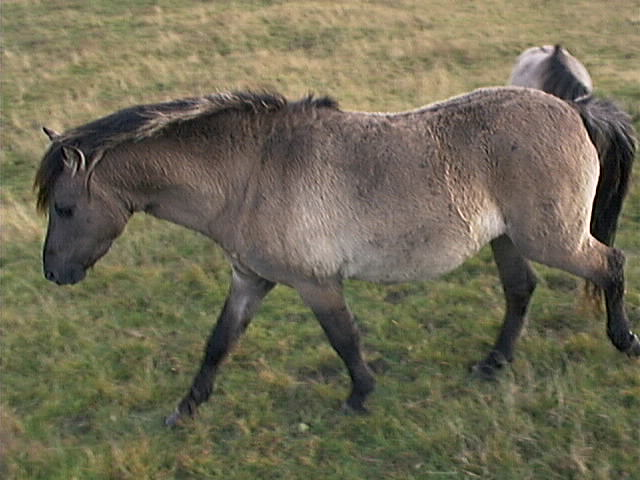
A Heck horse

In terms of equine coat color genetics, all of these shades are based on the dun gene acting as a dilution gene over the black gene. Because the grulla color is not due to the gray gene, a grulla horse remains the same basic color from birth, though some minor shade variation may occur from summer to winter coats. If a grulla also carries the gray gene, it will be born a mouse tan-gray shade, usually with bold primitive markings, but then lighten and eventually develop a white hair coat with age. Because black is less common in general than bay or chestnut, grulla is likewise less common than red duns or bay (classic or zebra) duns. For example, only 0.7% of quarter horses registered each year with the AQHA are grulla.

The most obvious ways to tell whether a horse is grulla are not only the gray or tan-gray body color, but also its primitive markings, which include some or all of the following: dark face, cobwebbing around the eyes and forehead, dark mottling on the body, leg barring (sometimes called tiger striping), dark ear tips and edging, dark ear barring, dark shadowing of the neck, dark dorsal and transverse striping, and light guard hairs bordering a dark mane and tail.

== Terminology ==
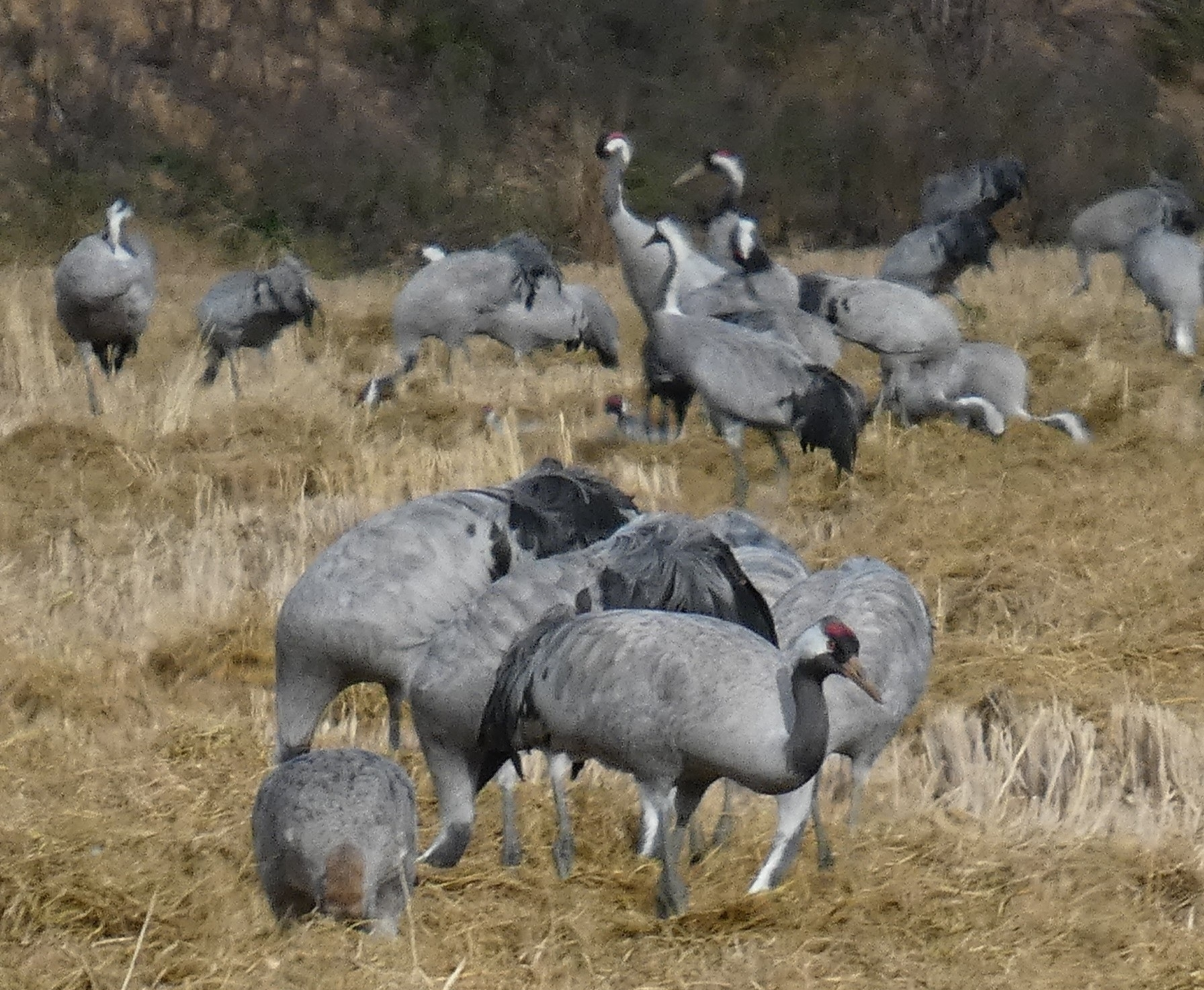
The common crane (Grus grus) is the most common species of crane in Spain and the giver of its name to the grullo color

The word "grulla" in Spanish means crane. (The original Spanish noun is pronounced [ˈɡɾuʝa] in American Spanish and [ˈɡɾuʎa] in Peninsular Spanish.) Though the Spanish word for "crane" is always "grulla" regardless of gender, some people call male horses "grullo" and female horses "grulla", including in Spanish.

Grulla is also called mouse dun or blue dun. In the Norwegian Fjord horse, the coat is called grå (meaning "gray").

== Distribution ==
The tarpan (Equus ferus ferus) was a relative of the domestic horse that became extinct in the nineteenth century, and which appears to have had grulla coloration. The tarpan has been considered a true wild horse, an undomesticated relative or ancestor of the domestic horse. However, some authorities in the early twentieth century held the opinion that most equines called tarpans were actually domestic or feral horses, not a separate species.

Several breeds with the grulla color have been developed in efforts to recreate ("breed back") the tarpan. These breeds include the Heck horse and Konik. One of the first experiments in this regard was published in 1906 by James Cossar Ewart, who obtained a "tarpan-like" horse by crossing a Shetland mare and a black Welsh pony.

== Sources and external links ==
- Grulla Color Genetics and Photos
- Dun & Grulla horse genetics, color, and photos
- http://www.equusite.com/articles/basics/colors/colorsGrullo.shtml
- Dun Zygosity test from Veterinary Genetics Laboratory, School of Veterinary Medicine, University of California, Davis. Web site accessed January 13, 2008.
- "Introduction to Coat Color Genetics" from Veterinary Genetics Laboratory, School of Veterinary Medicine, University of California, Davis. Web Site accessed January 12, 2008

https://www.spanishdict.com/translate/grullo
