= Buckskin (color) =

Equine coat color

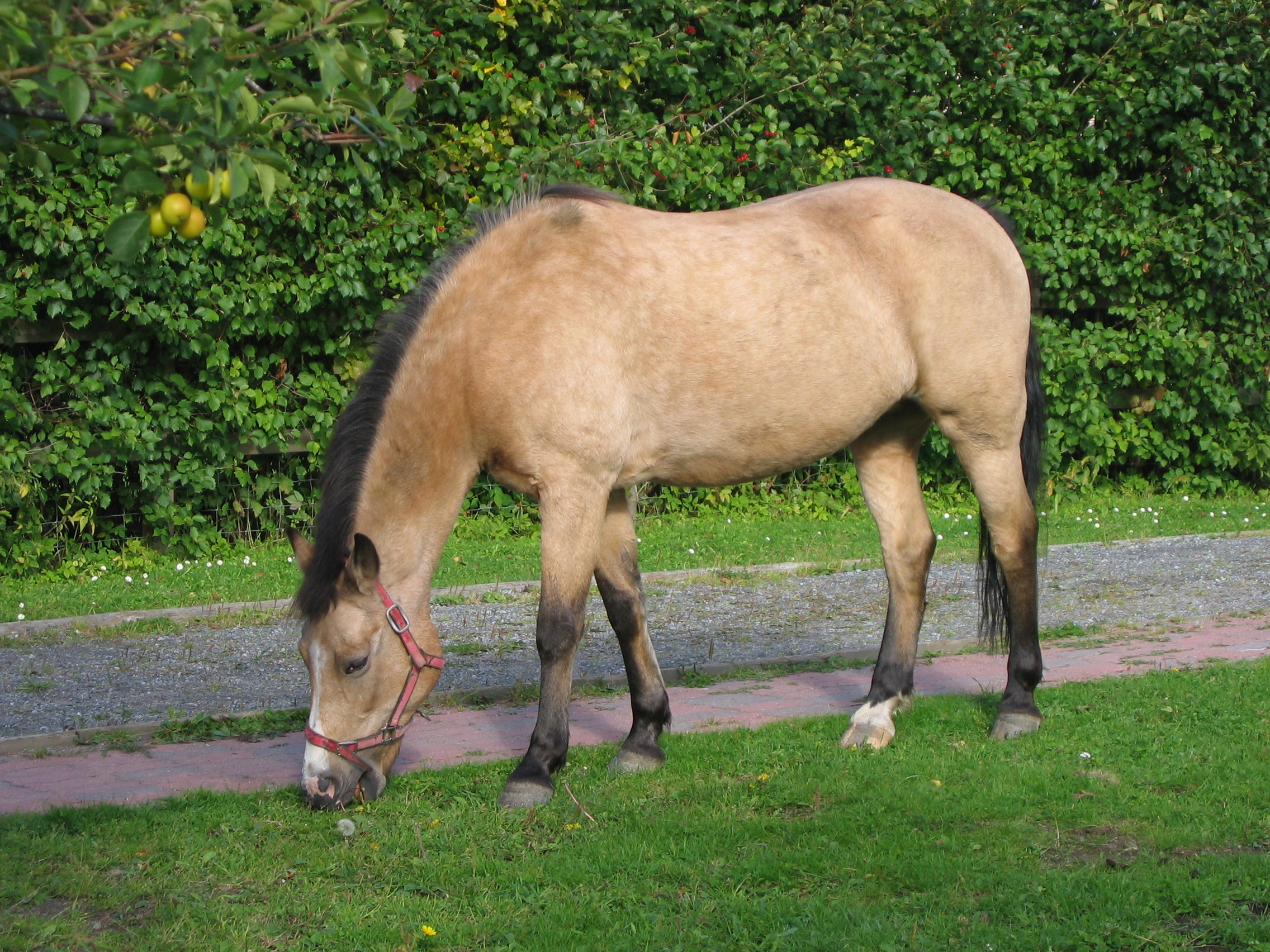
Buckskin New Forest pony

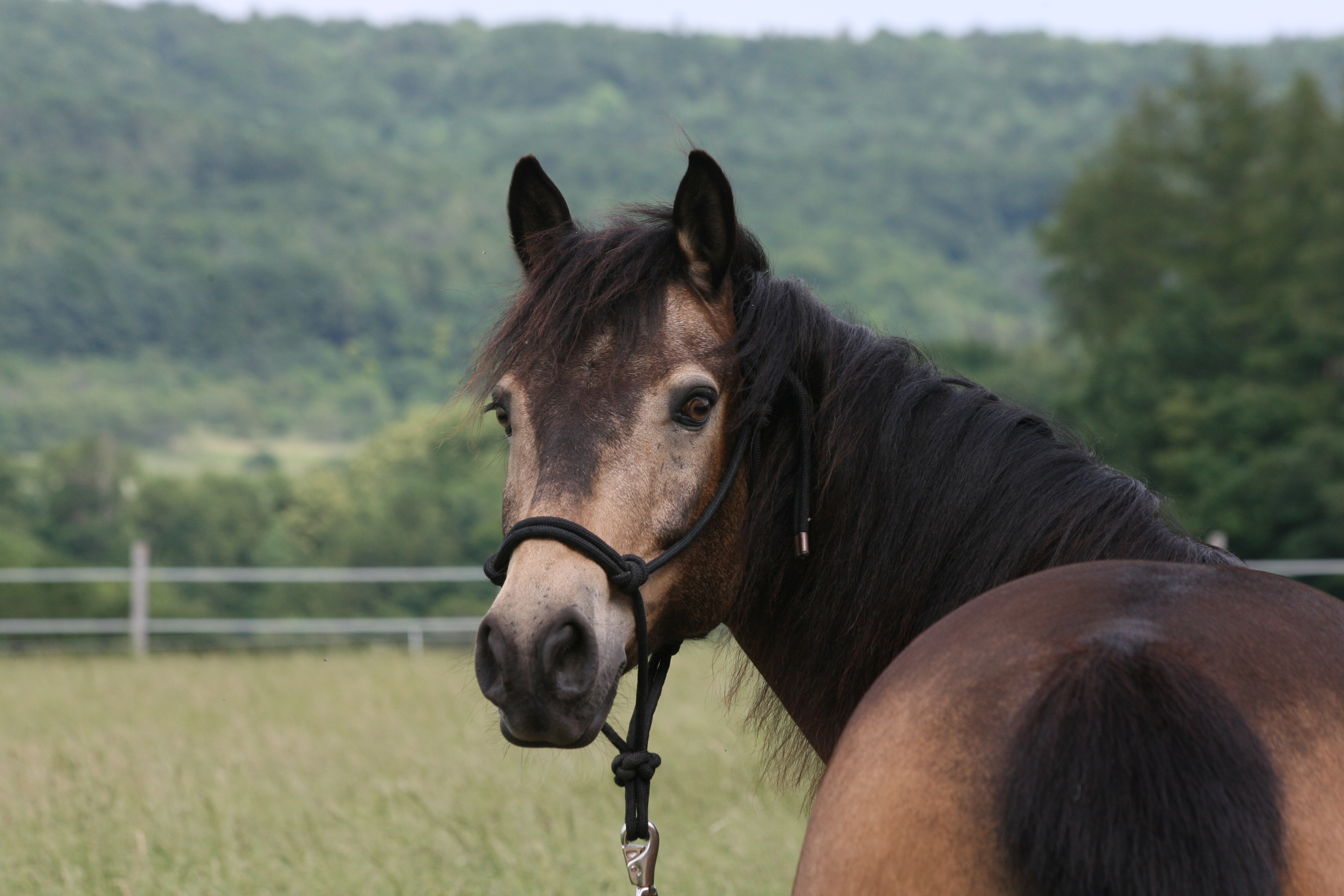
This sooty buckskin exhibits the slightly paler brown eyes common in buckskins

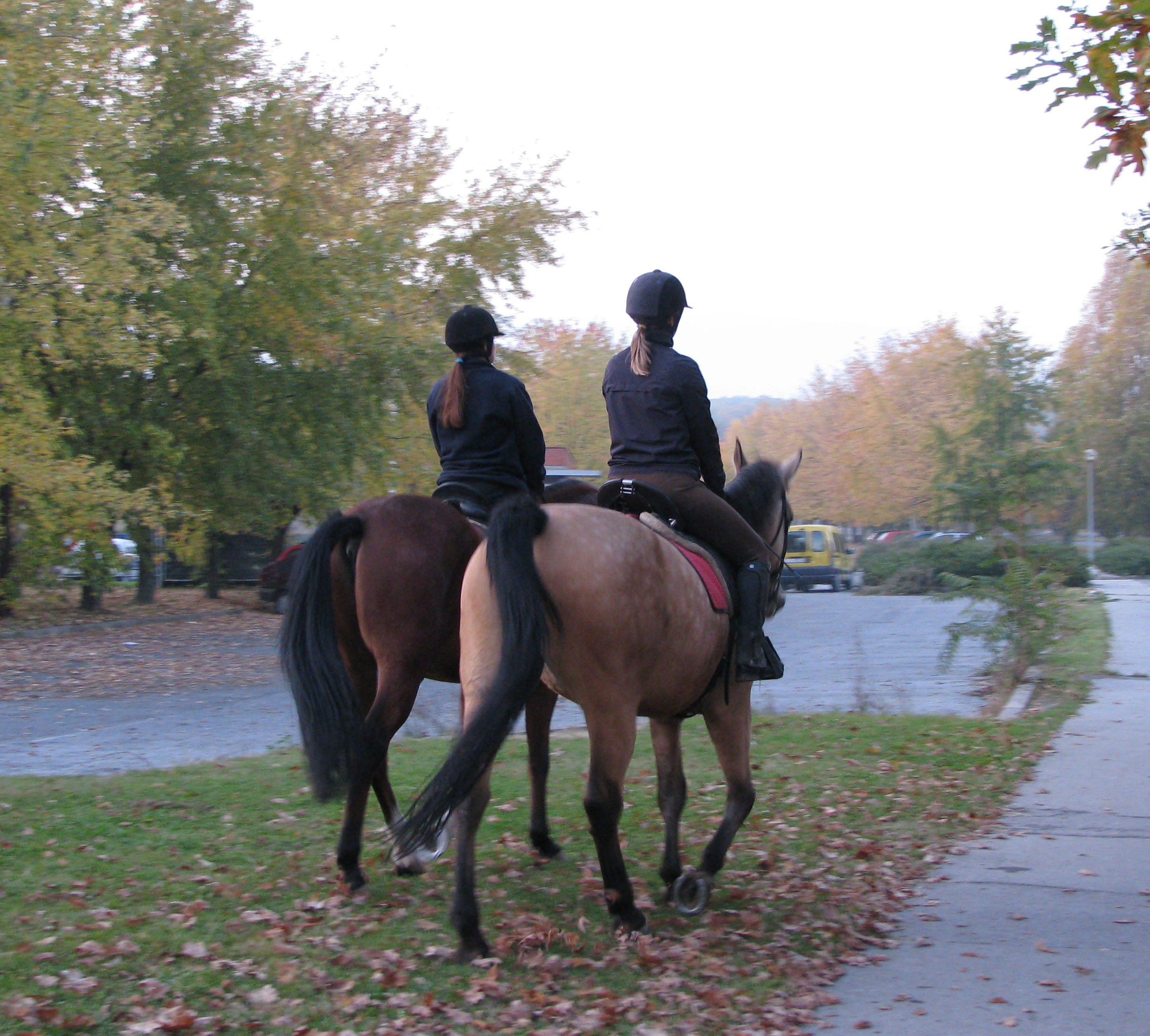
Undiluted bay and buckskin horse abreast.

Buckskin is an equine coat color of a tan or gold coat with black points (mane, tail, and lower legs). The name comes from the eponymous buckskin, a traditionally-tanned deer skin with similar coloration. Buckskin occurs as a result of the cream dilution gene acting on a bay horse. Therefore, a buckskin has the Extension, or "black base coat" (E) gene, the agouti gene (A) gene (see bay for more on the agouti gene), which restricts the black base coat to the points, and one copy of the cream gene (CCr), which lightens the red/brown color of the bay coat to a tan/gold.

Buckskins should not be confused with dun-colored horses, which have the dun dilution gene, not the cream gene. Duns always have primitive markings (shoulder blade stripes, dorsal stripe, zebra stripes on legs, webbing). However, it is possible for a horse to carry both dilution genes; these are called "buckskin duns" or sometimes "dunskins." Also, bay horses without any dun gene may have a faint dorsal stripe, which sometimes is darkened in a buckskin without a dun gene being present. Additional primitive striping beyond just a dorsal stripe is a sure sign of the dun gene.

A buckskin horse can occur in any number of different breeds. At least one parent must carry the cream gene, and not all breeds do. Since 1963, the American Buckskin Registry Association (ABRA) has been keeping track of horses with this coat color, and although Buckskin is sometimes classified as a color breed, due to its genetic makeup that depends on having one, not two copies of the dilution allele, coat color cannot ever be a consistent true-breeding trait.

Similar colors in some breeds of dogs are also called buckskin.

== See also ==
- Cream gene
- Equine coat color
- Equine coat color genetics
