= Flaxen (color variant) =

Lighter mane and tail on chestnut horses

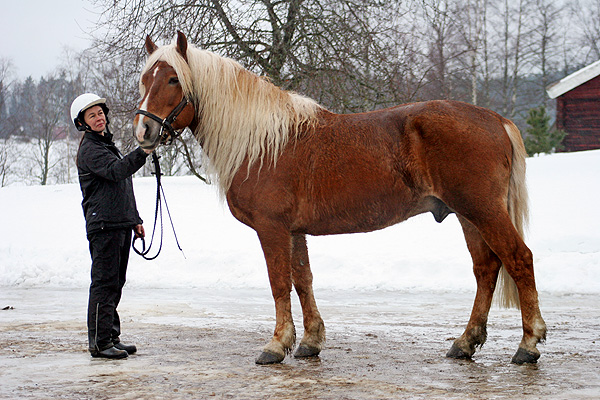
A chestnut horse with flaxen mane and tail

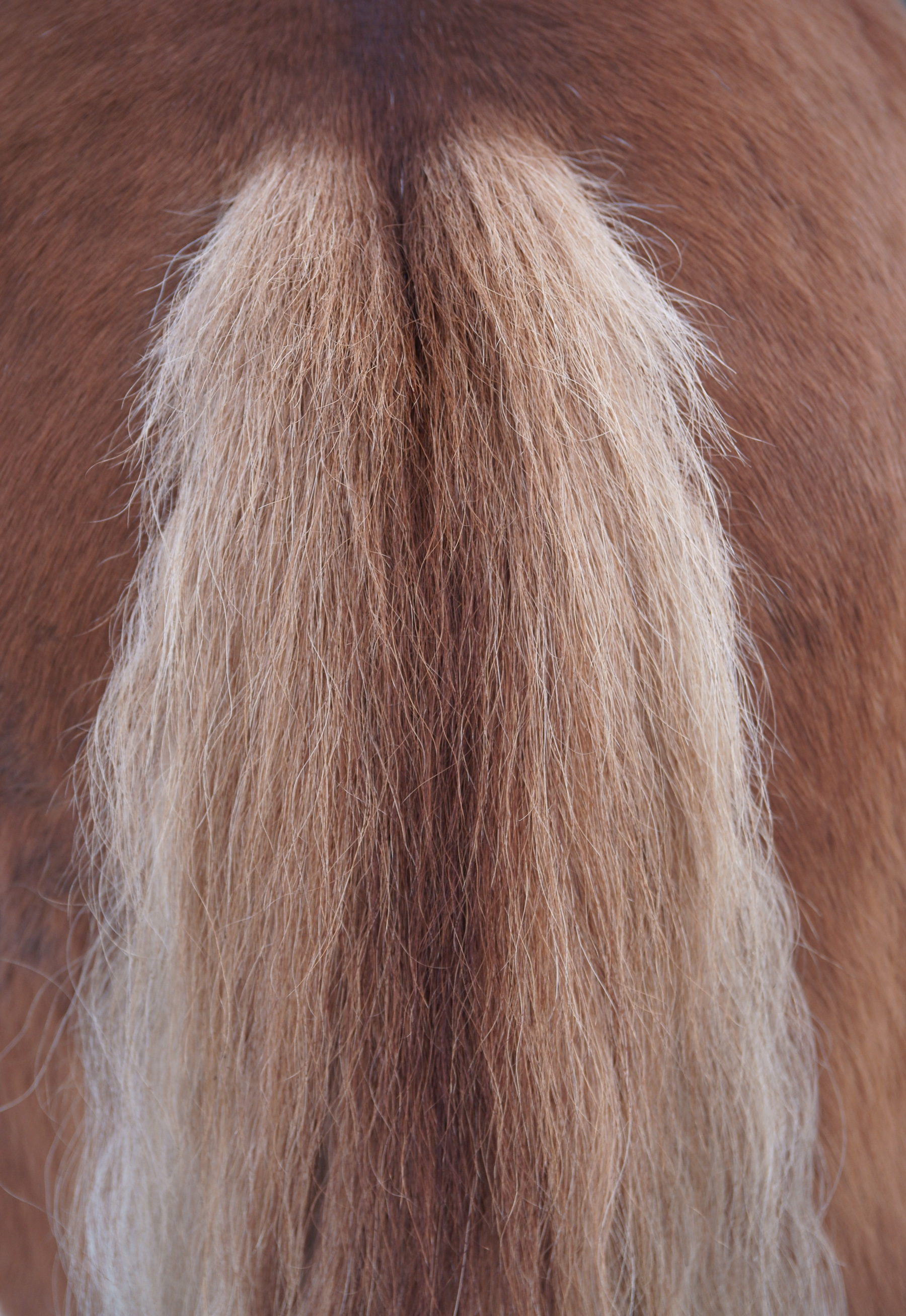
A flaxen tail with chestnut hairs mixed in

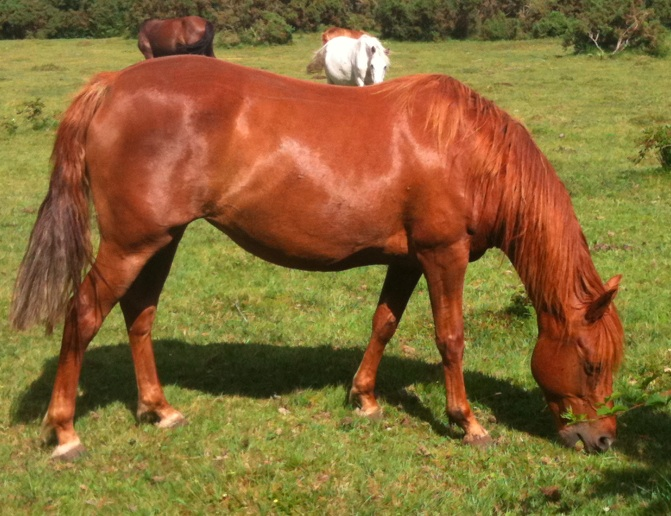
A chestnut horse without flaxen genetics

Flaxen is a genetic trait in which the mane and tail of chestnut-colored horses are noticeably lighter than the body coat color, often a golden blonde shade. Manes and tails can also be a mixture of darker and lighter hairs. Certain horse breeds such as the Haflinger carry flaxen chestnut coloration as a breed trait. It is seen in chestnut-colored animals of other horse breeds that may not be exclusively chestnut.

The degree of expression of the trait is highly variable, with some chestnuts being only slightly flaxen while others are more so. Flaxen was once thought to be produced by a recessive allele, based on preliminary studies, proposed as F^{f} for flaxen. However, more recently it is thought that it may actually be polygenic, influenced by multiple genes.

Some chestnut horses that do not exhibit much flaxen may nonetheless produce strongly flaxen offspring. Studies on Morgan horses have indicated that the flaxen trait is inherited. One found that flaxen chestnut horses mated with other flaxen chestnut horses consistently produce only flaxen chestnuts, which, if Mendelian inheritance is assumed, would make it a recessive gene. Flaxen does not affect black or bay horses, only chestnuts. However, as there are examples of flaxen chestnuts born to parents that are black or bay, it may be masked in darker-colored horses but still passed on to their offspring.

Horse breeds which are predominantly flaxen chestnut include the Black Forest, Breton, Frederiksborger, Haflinger, Jutland and South German Coldblood.

== Flaxen mimics ==
Coloration of a light mane and tail with darker body color may be created by other genetic mechanisms known as dilution genes, most of which can be detected by DNA testing. The most common is palomino, created by one copy of the cream gene acting on a chestnut coat, resulting in a gold-colored coat with a white or cream colored mane and tail. Deep gold palominos may be hard to distinguish from light chestnuts with significant expression of flaxen, but genetic tests can aid determination of color. The Champagne gene acting on a chestnut coat may also produce a horse with a gold coat and ivory mane and tail, distinguishable from palomino by freckled skin and light-colored eyes. In most cases, a chestnut with flaxen can be distinguished from other colors by the presence of some reddish, chestnut hairs in the mane or tail.

The silver or silver dapple gene acts only on black hair. On a black base coat, it lightens the body to a brown color and the mane/tail to a cream or silver shade; on a bay base coat, it lightens the mane and tail to cream or silver. It does not affect chestnut (red) coloring. A genetic test exists for the silver gene.

Flaxen mimics: dilution genes on basic colors
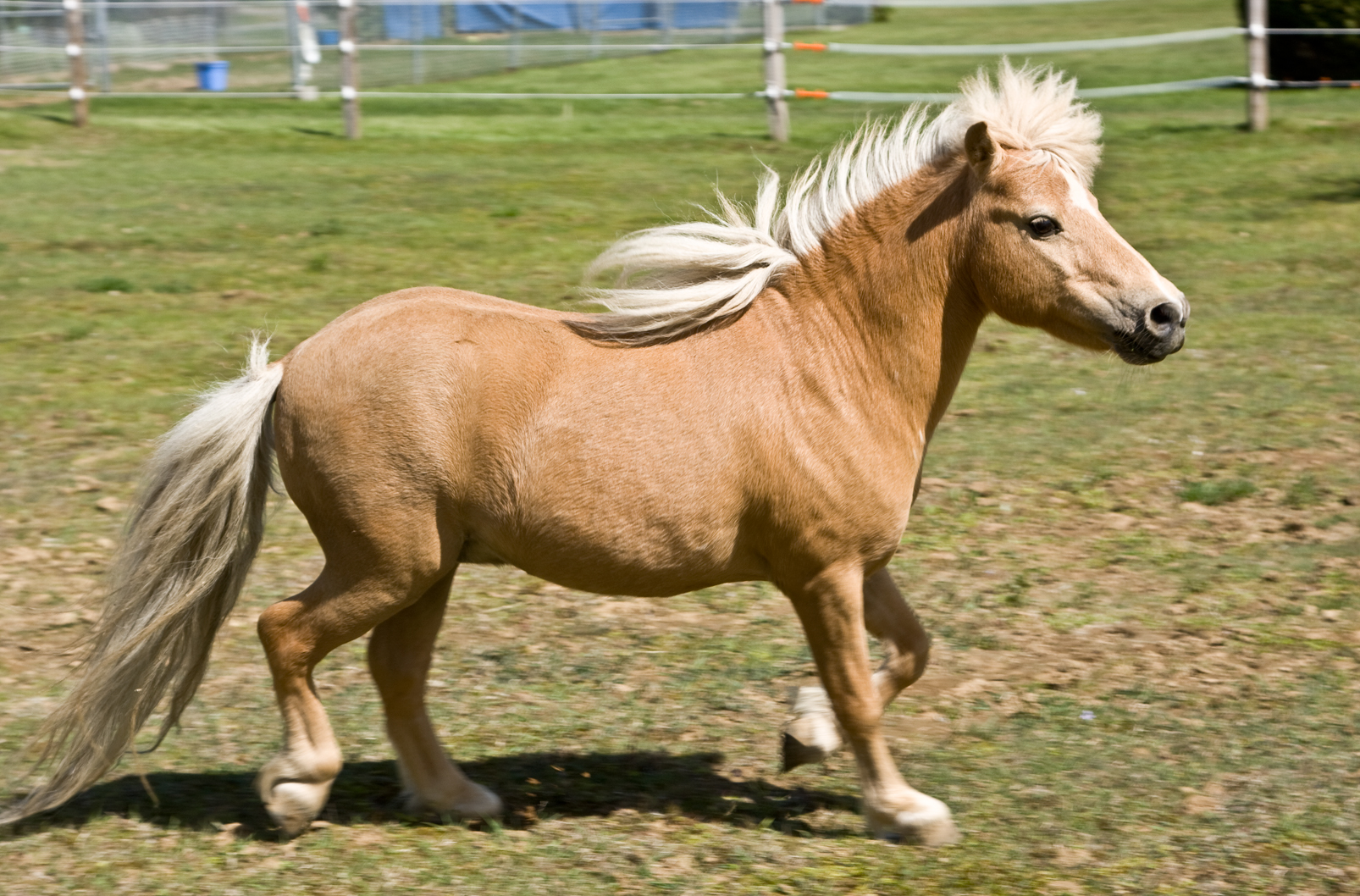
Palominos are chestnut with the cream gene

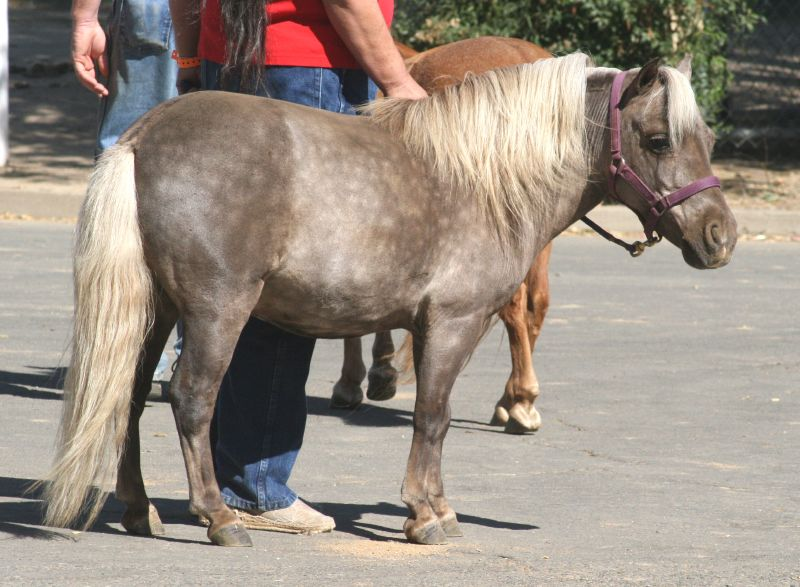
Silver dapple gene lightens black hair coat, and mane and tail

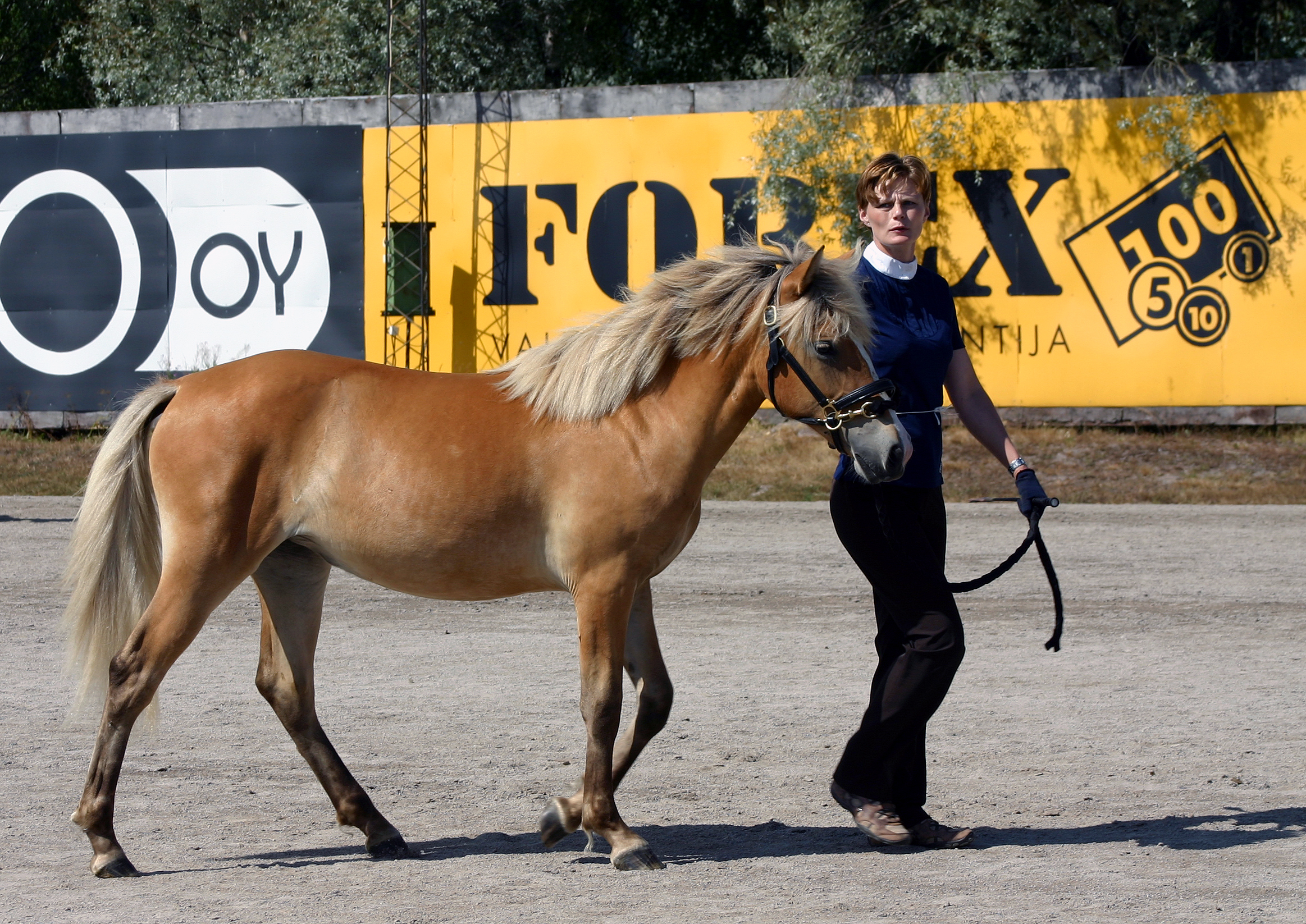
Silver dapple gene on bay
