= American Cream Draft =

American draft horse breed

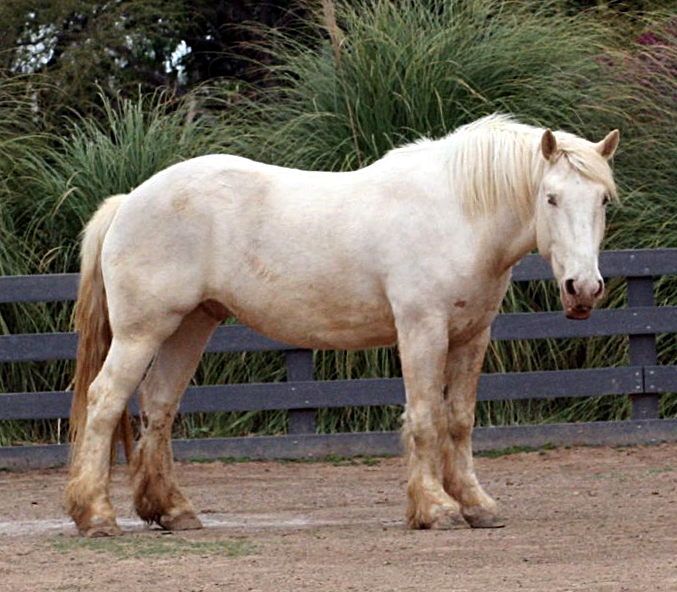

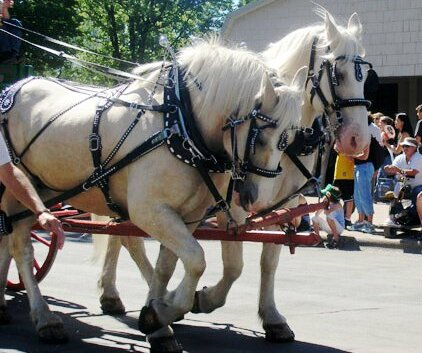
- Conservation status: Critical
- Country of origin: United States

Traits
- Distinguishing features: Cream color, medium-heavy build

Breed standards
- American Cream Draft Association

The American Cream Draft is an American breed of draft horse, characterized by the cream or "gold champagne" color of its coat. It was developed in Iowa during the early twentieth century from a cream-colored mare named Old Granny. A breed registry was formed in 1944 but became inactive for several decades when breed numbers dropped due to the mechanization of farming. It was reactivated in 1982 and population numbers have slowly grown since then. It is a rare breed: its conservation status is considered critical by The Livestock Conservancy and the Equus Survival Trust.

== Characteristics ==
American Creams have refined heads, with flat facial profiles that are neither concave nor convex. They have wide chests, sloping shoulders and short, strong backs. Their ribs are well sprung, and they are short-coupled with well-muscled hindquarters and with strong well-proportioned legs set well apart. They are sure-footed with strong hooves, and their movement is free and easy. According to enthusiasts, the breed has a calm, willing temperament, particularly suited for owners who are new to handling draft horses. Mares stand 15–16 hands (60–64 inches, 152–163 cm) high and weigh 1,500–1,600 pounds (680–730 kg), while stallions and geldings stand 16–16.3 hands (64–67 inches, 163–170 cm) and weigh 1,800 pounds (820 kg) or more.

The ideal coat color for the breed is a medium cream with pink skin, amber eyes and a white mane and tail. The characteristic cream color of the breed is produced by the champagne gene. Recognized colors include light, medium and dark cream, with amber or hazel eyes. A cream mare with dark skin and a light mane and tail may be accepted by the registry as foundation stock, while stallions must have pink skin and white manes and tails to be registered. Purebred American Cream foals that are too dark to be accepted into the main breed registry may be recorded into an appendix registry. The appendix will also accept half-bred Cream Draft horses crossed with other draft bloodlines if they meet certain requirements, and the registry provides an upgrade system that uses appendix horses to strengthen genes, increase breed numbers, and allow more diversified bloodlines.

=== Color genetics ===
The champagne gene produces diluted color, and the gold champagne body color, light skin, light eyes, and ivory mane and tail associated with the American Cream Draft are produced by the action of the champagne gene on a chestnut base coat. In the adult horse, the skin is pink with abundant dark freckles or mottling, and the eyes are hazel or amber. The eyes of champagne foals are blue at birth, darkening as they age, and a foal's skin is bright pink. The breed registry describes foals' eyes as "almost white", which is consistent with the nature of the champagne blue foal eye, which is creamier than other types of blue eye.

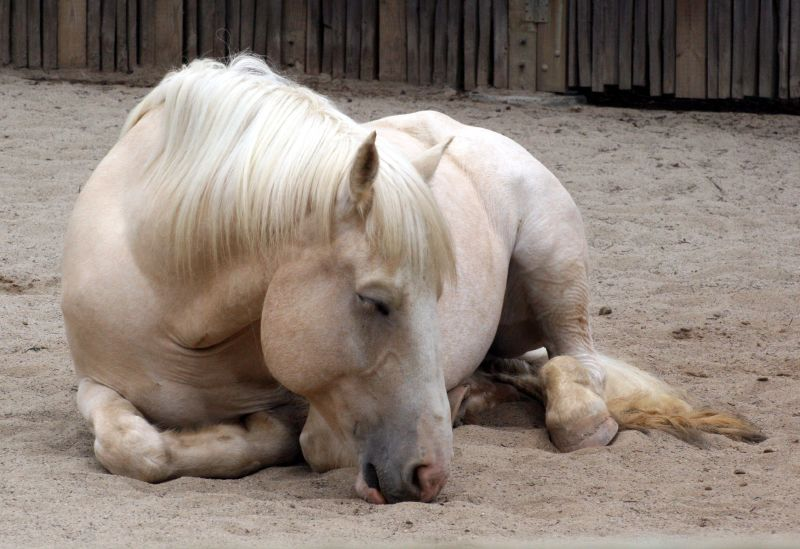
Skin freckling is slightly visible around the muzzle of this resting horse

Champagne is a dominant trait, based on a mutation in the SLC36A1 gene. The mapping of the gene was announced in 2008, and the American Cream Draft cross was among the breeds studied. The authors of this study noted that it was difficult to distinguish between homozygous and heterozygous animals, thus distinguishing champagne from incomplete dominant dilutions such as the cream gene. However they noted that homozygotes may have less mottling or a slightly lighter hair color than heterozygotes. Anecdotal reports also note mild differences, including lighter freckling, skin and hair coat, though eye color remains the same.

Dark-skinned American Cream Draft horses are actually chestnuts, as the breed is not homozygous for the champagne gene; only one allele is needed to produce the proper color. Champagne dilutes any base coat color, and in the American Cream Draft, the underlying genetic base color is chestnut. As of 2003, scientists have not found the breed to carry the cream gene, even though breeders refer to the desired color as "cream". The American Cream Draft is never cremello or white, and though the gold coat color with a white mane and tail resembles palomino, the breed's defining characteristics are the result of the champagne gene.

=== Junctional epidermolysis bullosa ===
The autosomal recessive genetic disease junctional epidermolysis bullosa (JEB) has been found in some American Cream Drafts. This is a lethal genetic disorder that causes newborn foals to lose large areas of skin and have other abnormalities, normally leading to euthanasia of the animal. It is most commonly associated with Belgian horses, but is also found in other draft breeds. A DNA test was developed in 2002, and JEB can be avoided as long as two carriers are not bred to one another. The American Cream registry states that it has "been pro-active in testing its registered animals since JEB was discovered".

== Breed history ==
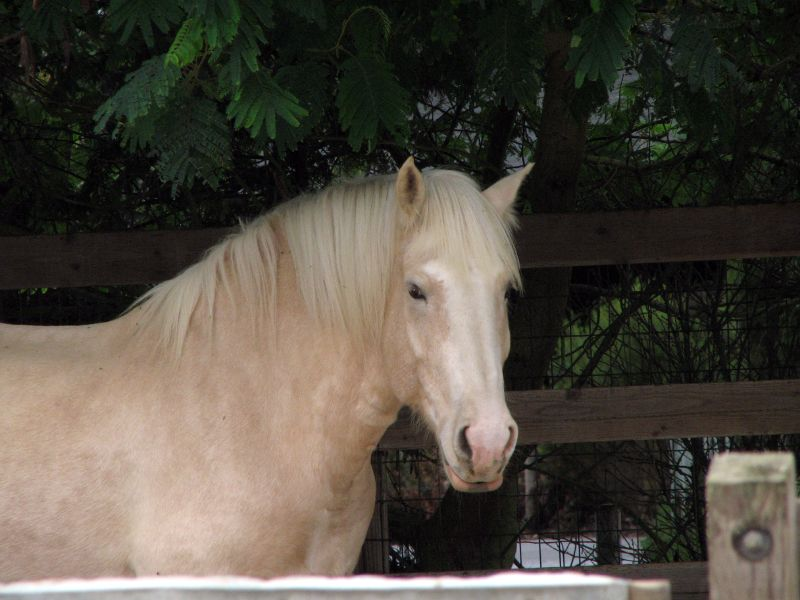
Head and shoulders of an American Cream

The American Cream Draft descends from a foundation mare named Old Granny. She was probably foaled between 1900 and 1905, and was first noticed at an auction in Story County, Iowa, in 1911 and purchased by Harry Lakin, a well-known stock dealer. She was eventually sold to Nelson Brothers Farm in Jewell, Iowa. Her breeding is not known, but she was cream-colored and many of her foals were as well; they sold for above-average prices because of their color. Her cream-colored coat, pink skin and amber eyes are defining standards for the breed, and the color is now known as gold champagne. In 1946, two years after the breed registry was formed, 98 percent of the horses registered could be traced back to Old Granny.

In 1920, a colt of Old Granny's named Nelson's Buck No. 2 impressed veterinarian Eric Christian to the point that Christian asked the Nelsons not to geld him. They agreed to let him remain a stallion, and he sired several cream-colored foals, though only one was registered: a colt named Yancy No. 3, whose dam was a black mare of Percheron breeding. Yancy sired Knox 1st, born in 1926 to an unregistered bay mare of mixed Shire ancestry. From this sire line, in 1931, a great-great-grandson of Nelson's Buck was born, named Silver Lace No. 9. Silver Lace was to become one of the most influential stallions of the American Cream breed. His dam was a Belgian mare with light chestnut coloring, and she is credited with Silver Lace's size – at 2,230 pounds (1,010 kg) he weighed considerably more than most of his bloodline.

Silver Lace quickly became a popular stallion in Iowa. However, stallions standing for public stud service in Iowa were required to be registered with the Iowa Department of Agriculture, and this agency only allowed horses of recognized breeds. As Silver Lace was not registered with any breed registry, his owners created a breeding syndicate, and mare owners who bought shares in the "Silver Lace Horse Company" could breed their mares to him. However, his main breeding career coincided with the economic struggles of the Great Depression, and Silver Lace was at one point hidden in a neighbor's barn to prevent his sale at auction. Another significant foundation stallion was Ead's Captain, whose bloodlines appear in about one-third of all American Cream Drafts.

Around 1935, despite the Depression, a few breeders started to linebreed and inbreed cream-colored horses to fix their color and type. In particular, C.T. Rierson began buying cream-colored mares sired by Silver Lace and developing the American Cream breed in earnest. In 1944, a breed association, the American Cream Association, was formed by 20 owners and breeders and granted a corporate charter in the state of Iowa. In 1950, the breed was finally recognized by the Iowa Department of Agriculture, based on a 1948 recommendation by the National Stallion Enrollment Board.

The mechanization of farming in the mid-20th century led to a decrease in the overall draft horse population, and with Rierson's death in 1957, American Cream Draft numbers began to decline. By the late 1950s there were only 200 living American Creams registered, owned by only 41 breeders. The registry became inactive until 1982 when three families who had retained their herds reactivated and reorganized the registry. In 1994, the organization officially changed its name to the American Cream Draft Horse Association (ACDHA).

=== 1990s to the present ===
In 1982, owners began blood-typing their horses, and by 1990, genetic testing found that "compared with other draft breeds and based upon gene marker data, the Creams form a distinct group within the draft horses." The American Cream Draft was found to have a genetic relationship with the Belgian breed that was no closer than the ones it had with the Percheron, Suffolk Punch and Haflinger breeds. Registry records dating to the early 20th century show no bloodlines other than draft breeding.

As of 2000, there were 222 registered horses, a number that increased to 350 as of 2004. Of these, 40 were "tracking horses" – either purebred American Creams that did not meet color requirements or crossbred horses that mix American Cream and other draft blood, but still meet the physical requirements for the registry. These tracking horses are allowed by certain regulations to be used as breeding stock, with the resulting foals able to be registered as purebred American Creams. Around 30 new horses are registered each year.

As of 2024, The Livestock Conservancy considers the breed to be at "critical" status, meaning that the estimated global population of the breed is less than 500, and there are less than 200 registrations annually in the US. The Equus Survival Trust also considers the population to be "critical", meaning that there are between 100 and 300 active adult breeding mares in existence today. To help replenish numbers, the ACDHA has developed regulations to permit foals to be registered when produced via methods such as artificial insemination and embryo transfer. Careful use of the appendix registry also allows numbers to increase.

The American Creams that live in Colonial Williamsburg have been called "the most famous of all American Cream Draft horses". Colonial Williamsburg acquired its first American Cream Draft horses in 1989 as part of its Rare Breeds program, which began in 1986. In the village, American Creams are used for wagon and carriage rides, and as of 2006, there is a breeding program run by Colonial Williamsburg that is working to increase breed numbers.
