= Mushroom gene =

Type of dilution gene affecting horse coat color

The mushroom gene is a recessive dilution gene that affects red pigment in horses. It was identified in 2014.

On a chestnut base coat the horse is born a pale beige with sometimes a greyish or pinkish tint and often keeps that color when it becomes an adult, but some turn darker when an adult.

On a bay base the horse is born a yellowish beige with a dark contrast stripe on the back, and as it grows older the horse will resemble a buckskin.

== Prevalence ==
As of 2019, the dilution has only been found in Shetland ponies in the United Kingdom. The effect of mushroom on chestnut is very similar to silver dapple on black, especially because both silver and mushroom give a coat with no reddish tinge. Several ponies with this colour have been tested for the extension gene and results showed they were chestnut, thus verifying that it affects the "red" pigment pheomelanin.

In 2019 the gene was mapped to the p.Asp201fs frameshift mutation in MFSD12 on equine chromosome 7. MSDF12 (major facilitator superfamily domain containing protein 12) is found in melanocytes and known to affect pigmentation in humans and mice. Genetic testing is available for mushroom.
