= Champagne gene =

Type of dilution gene affecting horse coat color

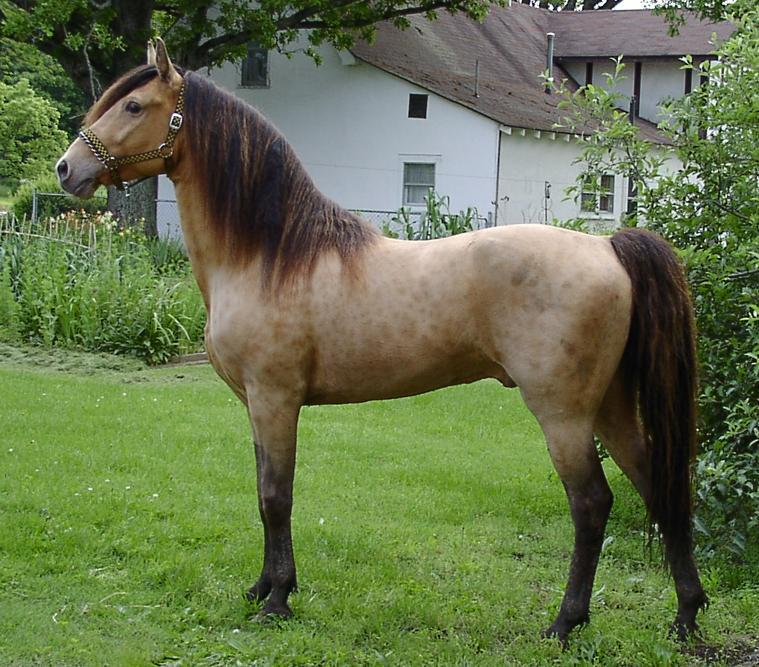
Champagne coloration is created by a dilution gene.

The champagne gene is a simple dominant allele responsible for a number of rare horse coat colors. The most distinctive traits of horses with the champagne gene are the hazel eyes and pinkish, freckled skin, which are bright blue and bright pink at birth, respectively. The coat color is also affected: any hairs that would have been red are gold, and any hairs that would have been black are chocolate brown. If a horse inherits the champagne gene from either or both parents, a coat that would otherwise be chestnut is instead gold champagne, with bay corresponding to amber champagne, seal brown to sable champagne, and black to classic champagne. A horse must have at least one champagne parent to inherit the champagne gene, for which there is now a DNA test.

Unlike the genes underlying tobiano, dominant white, frame overo spotting and the Leopard complex common to the Appaloosa, the champagne gene does not affect the location of pigment-producing cells in the skin. Nor does the champagne gene remove all pigment from the skin and hair, as in albinism. Instead, the champagne gene produces traits known as hypomelanism, or dilution. Champagne is not associated with any health defects. Other dilution genes in horses include the Cream gene, Dun gene, Pearl gene and Silver dapple gene. Horses affected by these genes can sometimes be confused with champagnes, but champagnes are genetically distinct. Champagnes are not palominos, buckskins, or grullos, nor does the word champagne indicate that a horse is a shiny or light shade of another coat color.

This gene and the associated coat colors are only known in American breeds, especially the American Cream Draft, Tennessee Walker, American Saddlebred and Missouri Fox Trotter.

== Coat colors ==
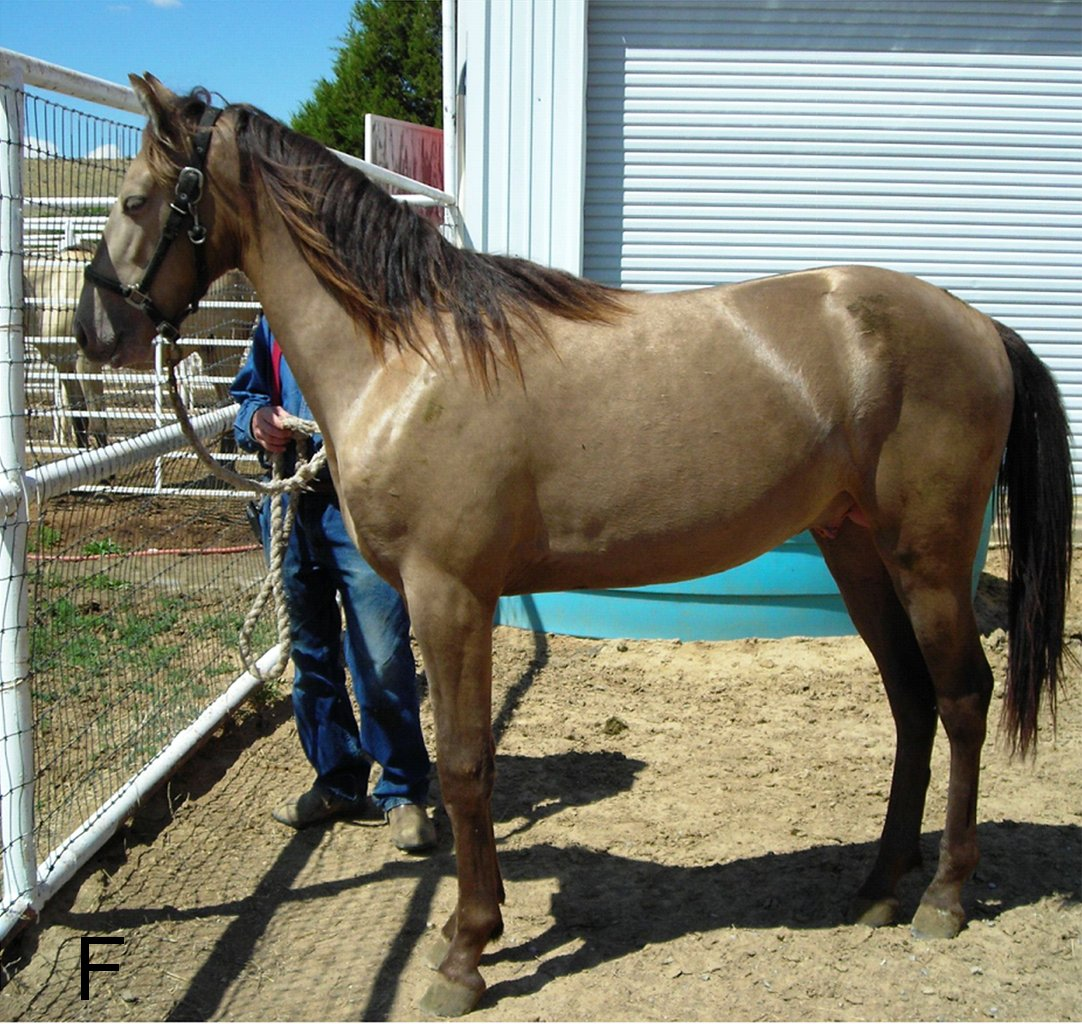
Classic champagne, black base diluted by champagne gene.

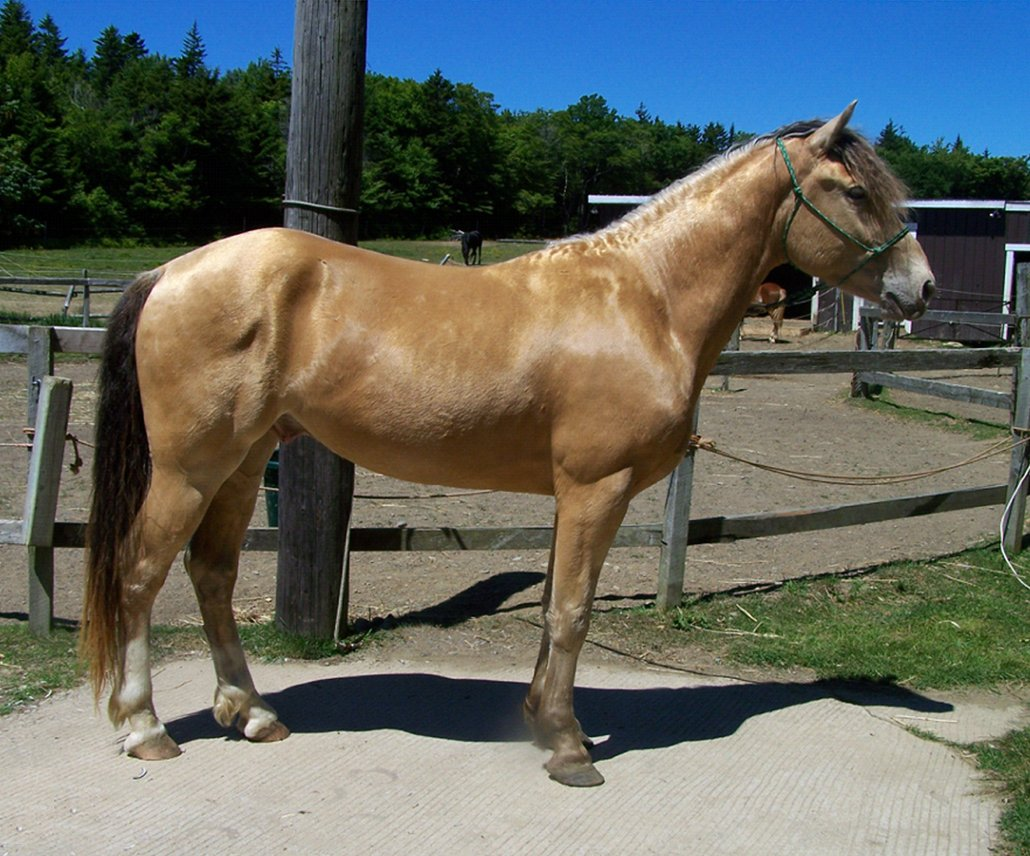
Amber champagne, bay base diluted by champagne gene.

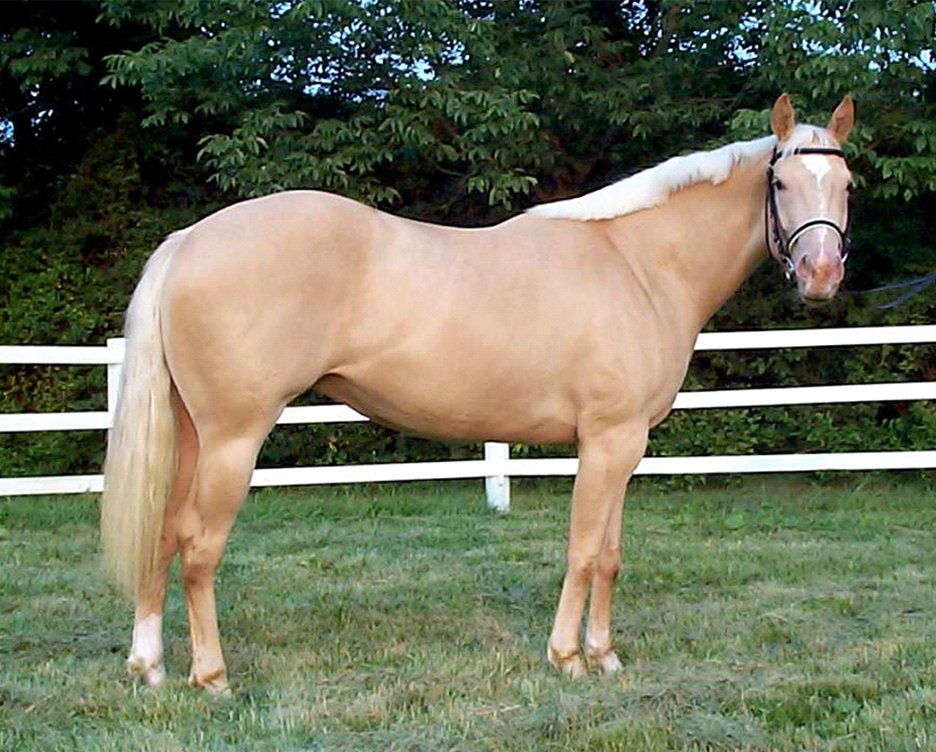
Gold champagne, chestnut base diluted by champagne gene. Note similarity to palomino, but distinguished by mottling around nose

Champagne is a dominant trait, based on a mutation in the SLC36A1 gene. A horse with either one or two champagne genes will show the effects of the gene equally. However, if a horse is homozygous for a dominant gene, it will always pass the gene on to all of its offspring, while if the horse is heterozygous for the gene, the offspring will not always inherit the color. Horses with the champagne gene may also carry other coat color genes that affect their phenotype, or outward color.

Horses with the champagne gene have a lightened hair coat and specific eye and skin color traits. Black pigment in the coat, if present, is lightened to chocolate, while red pigment is lightened to gold. The precise champagne dilute coat color produced depends on the underlying base coat color. The effects of champagne plus additional coat color genes have their own distinct vocabulary and appearances;

It is difficult to distinguish between homozygous and heterozygous champagne, which is different from incomplete dominant dilutions such as the cream gene. However the 2008 study that mapped the gene and identified it as a dominant trait noted in passing that homozygotes may have less mottling or a slightly lighter hair color. The authors of this study noted that

The following are considered the most "basic" champagne coat colors:

Classic champagne is, as its name suggests, the coat color most associated with the champagne gene. It is produced by the action of champagne on a black coat. The body coat is chocolate, the mane and tail a darker shade. The legs may also be slightly darker. The overall effect has also been described as lilac, dark taupe, and even green. This color is most often misclassified as grullo, and in the past was sometimes called "lilac dun."

Sable champagne is produced by the action of champagne on a seal brown coat. It is visually difficult to distinguish from classic champagne, and can be confirmed by a DNA test negative for the recessive black (a) allele at Agouti.

Amber champagne is produced by the action of champagne on a bay coat. The coat is gold with chocolate points. Just as there are varying shades of bay, the gold body coat may vary in shade as well. The legs are often lighter than the mane and tail, and the colored points may be difficult to see. The mane and tail may also have "frosting" or light edges, a trait that also occurs in bay duns and some buckskins. Amber champagne can be confused with buckskin or bay dun.

Gold champagne is produced by the action of champagne on a chestnut coat. The coat is gold, and the mane and tail are typically ivory. In some cases, the mane and tail may be self-colored, matching the body coat. These gold champagnes are sometimes called "dark gold" and may be an all-over apricot shade. Dark gold champagnes can be confused with red dun, while those with paler manes and tails were historically called "pumpkin-skinned palominos."

Apart from the unique shades, there are several qualities of the champagne coat that may be used to help identify them. Champagne coats often have an unusual sheen. This sheen makes champagnes difficult to photograph accurately, as the appearance of the coat depends on the lighting. Not all champagne horses have this sheen, and there are many extremely shiny non-champagne horses, so a "sheen" in and of itself does not indicate the champagne gene. The coat may also exhibit reverse dappling, though this is also an unreliable indicator.

=== Skin and eyes ===
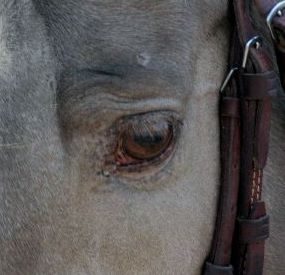
The tell-tale identifiers of the champagne gene in an adult horse are hazel eyes and freckled skin.

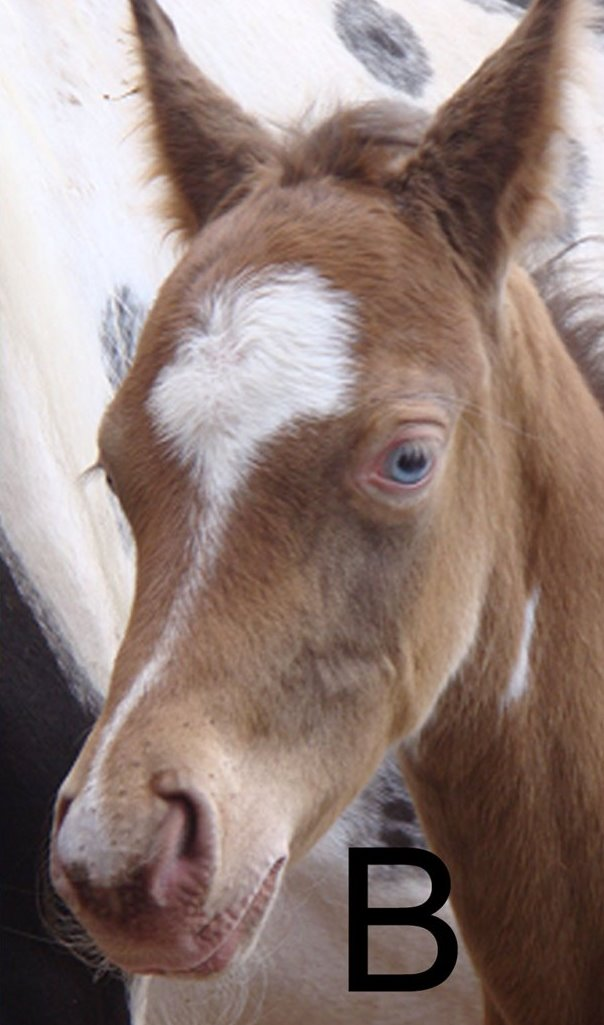
At birth, champagne horses have bright blue eyes and bright pink skin, as the horse matures the eyes darken to hazel and the skin becomes freckled.

The color of the skin is the single most important visual identifier of champagne horses: in the adult horse, the skin is "pink with abundant dark freckles, except under white markings." The freckles - not mottles, splotches, specks, or blotches - are dark and may have a purple cast, and are small and numerous. By comparison, mottling associated with the Leopard complex is large and blocky alternations between true black or charcoal-colored skin and pigmentless-pink skin. The skin of cremellos and perlinos is pigmented-pink, and exhibit a scant few tiny black specks. Homozygous pearls and pearl-cream combinations also exhibit some freckling of the skin, however this is muted in comparison to the freckles of champagne skin. The skin may exhibit an overall lavender tone. The color qualities of the skin are most evident around the eyes and muzzle, under the tail, and on the udder or sheath.

The eyes of an adult champagne horse are most often described as hazel or amber. In the newborn or very young foal, the eyes are bright blue to blue-green and the skin is bright pink. The champagne blue foal eye is creamier than other types of blue eye such as the bright, unpigmented blue seen on some pinto horses.

In the past, some breeders and horse owners had concerns that horses with light-colored skin and eyes were not healthy. However, the lightening of these parts of the horse due to the champagne gene is not known to be linked to any health or genetic defects. While horses with white markings may sunburn on exposed unpigmented skin, the freckled-pink skin of a champagne horse is said to tan instead. In addition, the color of the hoof has no bearing on its strength.

=== Interaction with other coat color factors ===
The presence of other coat color modifying alleles has no effect on whether or not a horse has the champagne trait. However, different traits may interact; they may suppress, enhance, obscure or cancel out various tell-tale clues to the genetic identity of a coat color. Coat colors involving multiple genes often have an unexpected appearance and unique terminology. This type of genetic interaction is called epistasis.

Horses with both the champagne gene and the cream gene are the most common combination. The cream gene is responsible for the palomino, buckskin and cremello coat colors, and is a dose-dependent or incomplete dominant, meaning that a horse with only one copy is visibly different from a horse with two copies of the gene. A single copy of the cream gene dilutes red pigment in the coat to gold or yellow, and has a slight effect on the skin and eye color. The black pigment is lightened little, if at all. Two copies of the cream gene dilute both red and black pigments in the hair to cream or ivory, dilute the skin to a rosy-pink and the eyes to pale blue. The cream gene and champagne gene have an additive or enhancing interaction. Horses with the champagne gene and a single cream gene typically have lighter yellowish or blue eyes and paler, more faintly freckled skin.

- Gold cream or Ivory champagne refers to an otherwise-chestnut coat affected by the champagne gene and a single copy of the cream gene. The mane, tail, and coat of gold creams are typically ivory and difficult to distinguish from cremello, other than by the skin and eyes.
- Amber cream, similarly, is an otherwise-bay coat affected by the champagne gene and a single copy of the cream gene. The mane and tail of a typical amber cream are a warm yellowish-brown and are often frosted. The legs may also be a light chocolate brown, but need not be. The body coat is a shade of ivory, usually darker than a gold cream. Their points are substantially darker than those of a perlino, and they have champagne skin and eye traits.
- Sable cream is a seal brown coat affected by champagne and a single copy of the cream gene. Sable creams may more closely resemble amber cream or classic cream. Most are several shades darker, with a cooler hue, than amber creams.
- Classic cream is a black coat affected by champagne and a single copy of the cream gene. Classic cream coats should resemble classic champagne shades, being only slightly lightened by the cream gene. Their coats may have a cooler hue.
- Double cream champagne is a coat of any color affected by champagne and both copies of the cream gene. Unlike the coat colors associated with only a single cream gene, double cream champagnes (respectively prefixed with "gold," "amber," etc.) retain no obvious champagne traits. Their skin is clear pink without freckling, and the eyes are pale blue. The terms "cremello champagne", "perlino champagne" and so forth are also acceptable.

Horses with both the champagne gene and the dun gene are also well-recorded. The dun gene is responsible for flat, diluted coat colors and vivid primitive markings. Bay dun is thought to be the wildtype horse coat color. Dun does not affect skin or eye color, but dilutes red pigment to yellow and black pigment to slate gray. Champagne horses with the dun gene will have slightly further-diluted coats compared to non-dun champagnes, and will always exhibit striking primitive markings, such as a dorsal stripe and zebra-like stripes on the legs. Naming schemes are much the same as with champagne-cream combinations. Champagne-dun combinations retain their champagne eye and skin traits. The coats are distinguishable from non-champagne duns in that they are several shades lighter, black pigment is chocolate rather than slate, and they may exhibit a sheen. The coats are distinguishable from non-dun champagnes in the presence of primitive markings and a flatter tone.

- Gold dun refers to an otherwise-chestnut coat affected by both the champagne gene and dun gene. The mane and tail may be ivory or self-colored; the body coat ranges from a warm cream to apricot color with primitive markings a shade darker. The coat is substantially paler and more "yellow" than that of a chestnut dun, and flatter than that of a gold champagne.
- Amber dun refers to an otherwise-bay coat affected by both the champagne gene and dun gene. The mane and tail and primitive markings are warm chocolate brown with a buff tan-colored body. The legs may, or may not, be dark as well.
- Sable dun refers to an otherwise-seal brown coat affected by both the champagne gene and dun gene. The points are chocolate-colored and the coat is darker than the amber dun.
- Classic dun or Classic grulla refers to an otherwise-black coat affected by both the champagne gene and dun gene. The coat possesses more cool slate-gray tones than a classic champagne, while the points are warmer than a grulla.

The silver dapple gene in horses does not affect the eyes, skin, or red pigment. Chestnuts are unaffected, but in bay, seal brown, and black horses, the black pigment is diluted to a chocolate or silver. The mane and tail are most commonly affected. Champagne horses with the silver gene will retain their champagne skin and eye traits, but the black pigment will be further diluted. Silvers vary tremendously in shade and so defining a "typical" example is difficult.

- Amber silver refers to an otherwise-bay coat affected by both the champagne gene and silver gene. The interaction of these two genes - one diluting black to warm chocolate and red to gold, and the other diluting black further to silver - creates an unexpected phenotype. The more closely resembles colors in the red family, mostly deprived of black pigment. The mane and tail may be self-colored, and the coat is buttery and pale.
- Classic silver refers to an otherwise-black coat affected by both the champagne gene and silver gene. The darkest examples resemble classic champagnes with a silvery mane and tail. The palest are a very pale pewter. Some have warm chocolate tones, others do not.

The champagne gene, in combination with some white patterning genes, can also produce unexpected phenotypes. Horses with the leopard gene or Appaloosas exhibit starkly mottled skin around the muzzle, eyes, anus and sheath or udder. Most commonly, the mottling is blocky patches of normal, black skin and unpigmented pink. When a horse has both the leopard gene and the champagne gene, the champagne-associated skin is present only where the skin would be otherwise black.

In combination with gray, champagne produces very unusual coat behavior. Typically, gray horses are born a dark shade of their natural color, and begin to develop gray hairs around the eyes and muzzle. With each shed, the coat becomes lighter and lighter. Many older grays develop the "fleabitten" trait, in which small, interspersed flecks of red occur and often increase in density with age, even as the rest of the coat loses pigment. A few grays will also develop vitiligo in which the skin also progressively loses pigment. When a horse carries both gray and champagne, additional traits occur: Gray-champagnes are born with darker coats than the usual champagne foal, but still exhibiting the expected bright blue eyes and pink skin. The freckling that develops on the skin is also exceptionally dark and dense. Gray-champagnes appear more likely to experience vitiligo. The most unexpected quality of gray-champagnes is the intensity of the fleabitten trait. Flecks of champagne-colored hair are thickly interspersed in the unpigmented white hairs.

=== Champagne mimics ===
Many coat color modifying genes affect the skin and eyes as well as the coat color. Several of these may be confused with champagne. Today, when the visible cues are insufficient, horses can be DNA tested for the champagne gene, Cream gene, Pearl gene, and Silver dapple gene.

Palomino or Chestnut vs. Gold champagne: The most common confusion, as both of these genetically distinct coat colors feature a gold or yellow coat and ivory or cream mane and tail. As adults, the pinkish freckled skin and hazel eyes indicate gold champagne, while gray or black skin and light or dark brown eyes indicate palomino. At birth, palominos may have pink skin and blue or grey eyes, however these darken within days or weeks. Occasionally, chestnuts are also born with blue eyes and pink skin, and as gold champagnes often have chestnut-colored foal coats, the two can be difficult to distinguish. Again, the skin and eyes of the chestnut will darken quickly. In all cases, pedigrees can provide important information. Palominos will have a parent that is palomino, buckskin, smoky black, or blue-eyed cream. Champagnes will have a champagne parent.

Buckskin and Bay dun vs. Amber champagne: All three of these genetically distinct coat colors feature a lighter bronze or tan coat with darker points. As adults, the pinkish freckled skin and hazel eyes indicate amber champagne, while gray or black skin and light or dark brown eyes indicate buckskin or bay dun. Duns do not exhibit unusually colored skin, though buckskins, like palominos, may be born with blue eyes that darken within days or weeks. In the adult, the points of a buckskin or bay dun will be black, not chocolate as in the amber champagne. Bay dun horses also exhibit primitive markings, especially a dorsal stripe, though amber duns will also possess these marks. The eyes and skin remain the best identifying feature. Buckskins, like palominos, will a parent that is palomino, buckskin, smoky black, or blue-eyed cream. Bay duns will have a parent that is bay dun, red dun, or grullo. Champagnes will have a champagne parent.

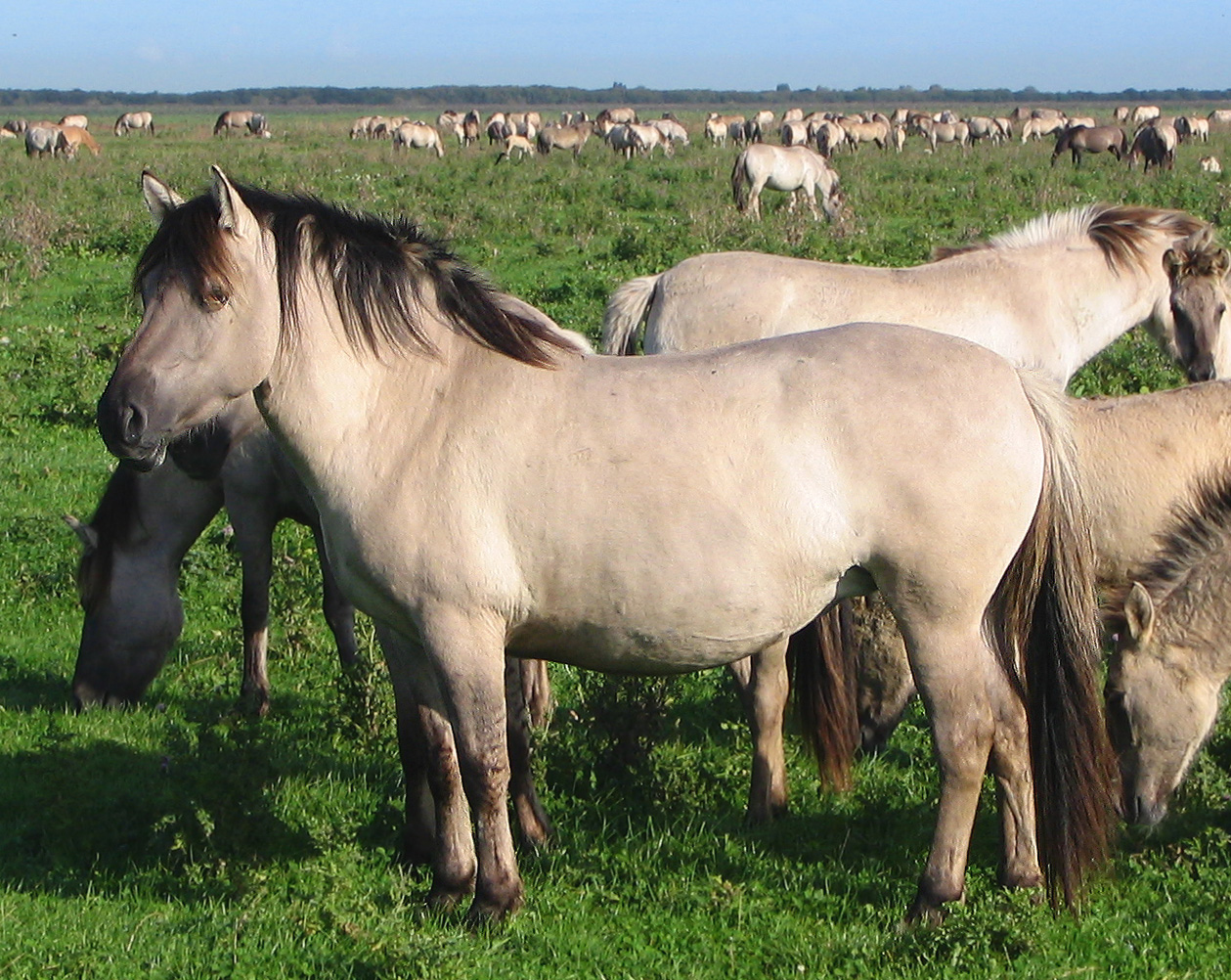
Duns have dark brown eye, black skin, and exhibit primitive markings.

Grullo vs. Classic champagne or Sable champagne: Classic and sable champagnes are difficult to distinguish without a DNA test. Grullos and classic champagnes are both dilutions of the black coat, and typically have black or dark points and dove-gray coats. However, Grullos, in absence of any other dilution factors, are not born with pink skin and blue eyes, while champagnes always have these traits. As adults, grullos will retain their dark brown eyes and black skin, while champagnes have pinkish freckled skin and hazel eyes. Grullos, like all duns, will possess primitive markings, and their coats are typically a cooler, slate shade, while classic and sable champagnes are chocolate-toned. The points and primitive markings on the grullo are black, while the points on classic and sable champagnes are brown. Grullos will have dun ancestry and champagnes will have champagne ancestry.

Red dun vs. Dark gold champagne: Some gold champagnes have darker bodies and self-colored manes and tails. These horses may resemble red duns, however red duns have distinct primitive markings and do not possess pinkish freckled skin or hazel eyes as adults, nor the bright pink skin and bright blue eyes of champagne foals.

Blue-eyed cream vs. Champagne: Blue-eyed cream is a collective term for any horse homozygous for the Cream gene (cremello, perlino, etc.). Blue-eyed creams, as their name suggests, have blue eyes from birth through adulthood and also have pink skin. Typically their blue eyes are quite pale, and are easy to distinguish from the sky blue eyes of champagne foals and the hazel eyes of adult champagnes. Their skin may have a scant few black flecks, but the abundant freckles of champagne skin are absent. The respective shades of pink skin and blue eyes are slightly different.

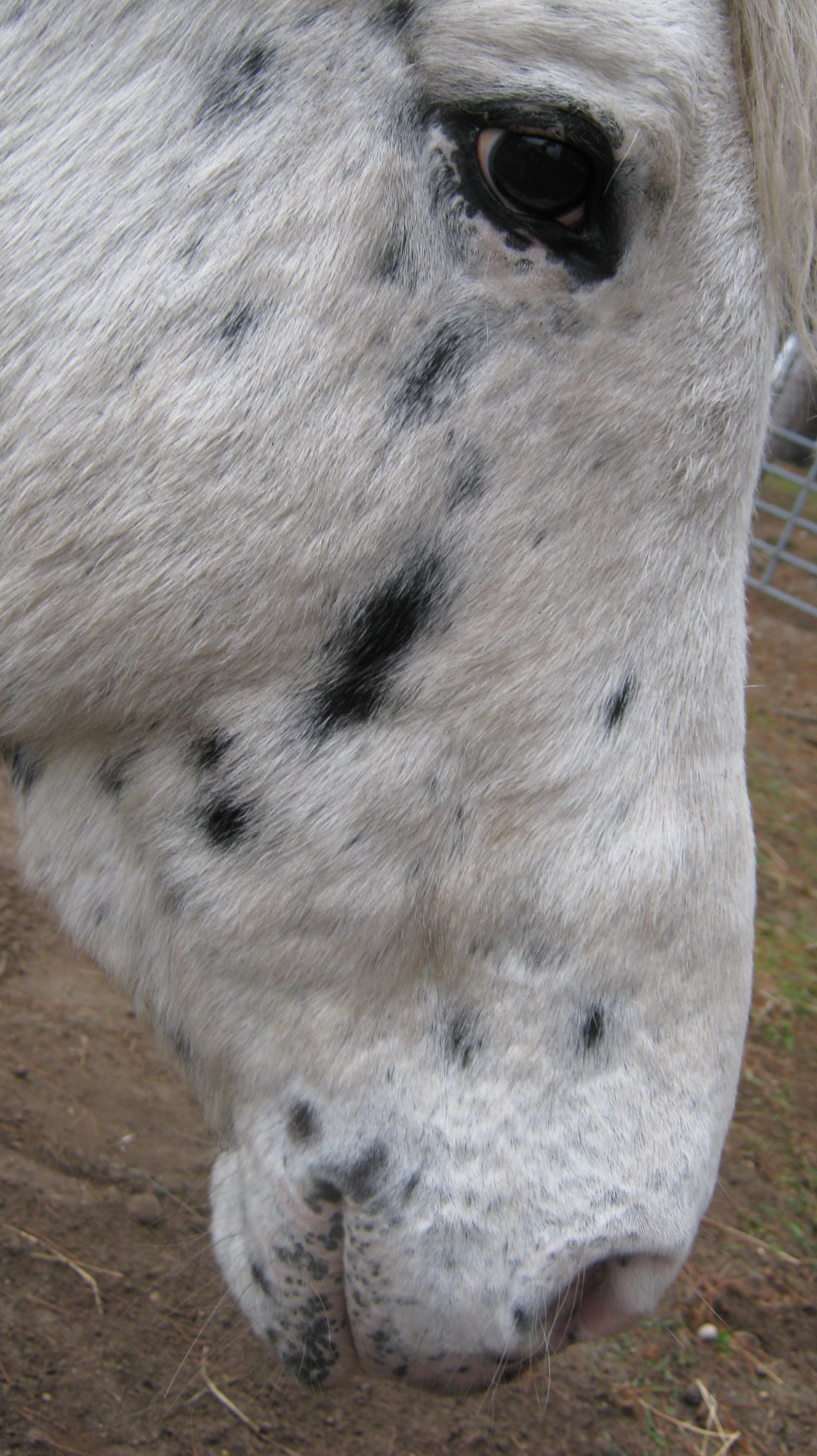
Leopard complex has a different mottling pattern from champagne's freckling pattern

Leopard vs. Champagne: The Leopard complex is responsible for the spotted coat of the Appaloosa and other breeds. Even when a spotted hair coat is absent, other traits produced include mottled skin and a white sclera around the eye but generally the eye itself is dark brown. These mottles are alternations between unpigmented pink skin and pigmented skin, which is usually black (thus the mottles are black on a pink background). The mottles are substantially larger than the freckles of champagne skin, and leopard complex horses do not necessarily have light eyes.

Pearl vs. Champagne: In the homozygous state, or when combined with cream, the Pearl gene produces a diluted apricot to buff color, pale eyes and pale skin. Heterozygous pearls (one copy of the gene) often exhibit dark skin with some pinkish freckles, while homozygous pearls (two copies of the gene) have champagne-like skin. The freckles on homozygous pearls and pearl-creams are pale and muted.

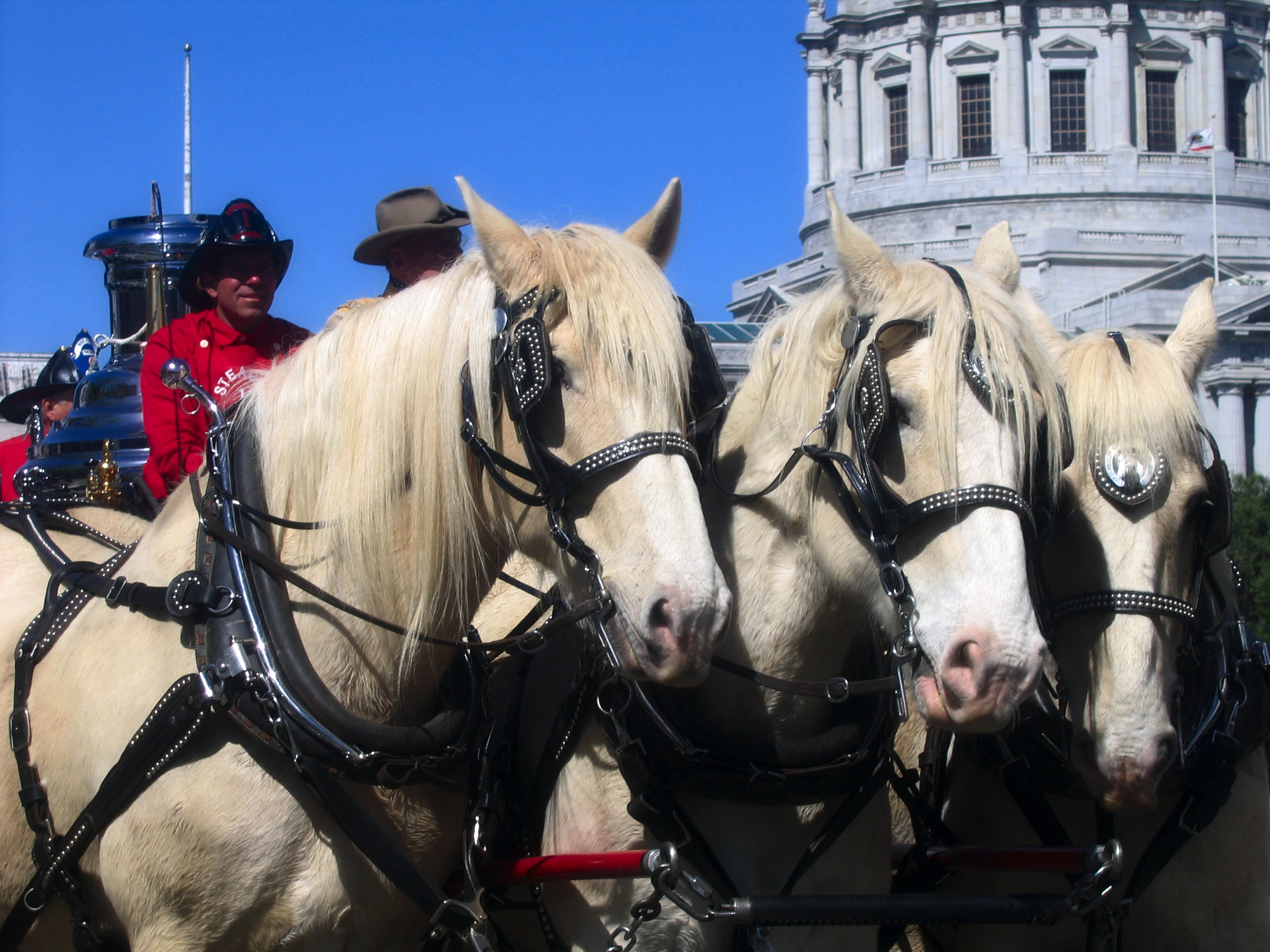
Most American Cream Draft horses owe their consistently reproducible coat color to the champagne gene.

== Prevalence ==
Compared to the cream gene, which is widespread throughout many breeds on different continents, the champagne gene is rare and found almost exclusively among American horse breeds. Nearly all American Cream Draft horses are gold champagne. The champagne gene is also found in the Tennessee Walking Horse, American Saddlebred, Missouri Fox Trotter, Racking horse, Kentucky Mountain Saddle Horse, Spanish Mustang, American Quarter Horse, American Paint Horse, Appaloosa and Miniature horse breeds.

== History ==
The champagne gene was located in 2008, but is not a new mutation. It is widespread among American horses, and has likely been present in the genepool for more than a century. The Palomino Horse Breeders Association (PHBA), which registers "palomino" horses based on appearance, includes allowances for freckle-skinned and hazel-eyed palominos. Furthermore, while the registry typically disallows horses with pink skin, it allows American Saddlebreds with skin of any color to be registered. The PHBA was incorporated in 1941. Further back, the foundation mare of the American Cream Draft horse breed, "Old Granny", was born around 1905 in Iowa. Her cream-colored coat, pink skin and amber eyes are defining standards for the breed of her descendants, which are now known to be gold champagne. The superficial similarities between gold champagne and palomino, and amber champagne and buckskin, may account for the relatively recent identification of champagne as a separate trait. Gold champagnes were sometimes called "pumpkin-skinned palomino." Classic champagnes, which lack the primitive markings of true duns, were similarly called "lilac duns." The mare that brought the champagne coat color family to the attention of modern researchers was a Tennessee Walking Horse named "Champagne Lady Diane" born in 1969. A classic champagne, Champagne Lady Diane was described as "a genetic color accident" after her hairs were sent to several universities, although current evidence suggests that the champagne gene predates Champagne Lady Diane.

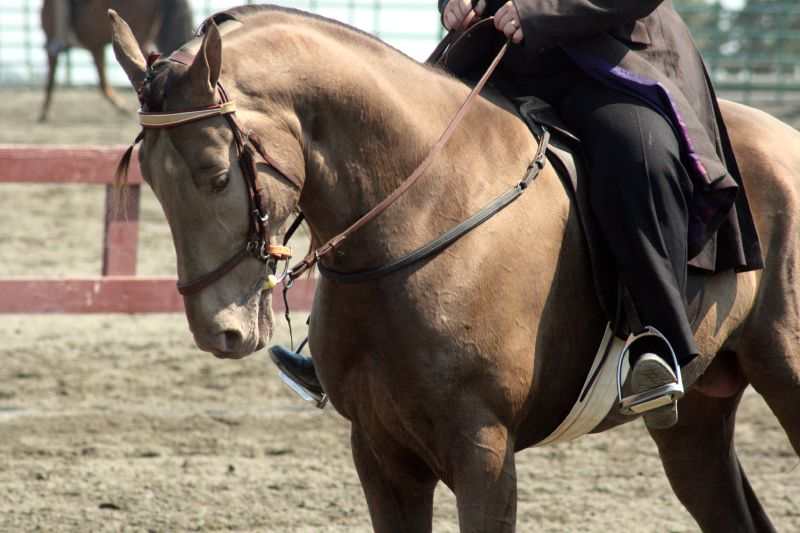
This classic champagne Tennessee Walking Horse illustrates the unusual sheen common to many champagnes.

It was not until many years after the name "champagne" was ascribed to Champagne Lady Diane that the term appeared in scientific literature. It was first studied and described by Sponenberg and Bowling in 1996. They studied the ratio of champagne-to-non-champagne offspring of champagne horses, and designated the causal mutation as the dominant Ch allele on the hypothetical Champagne locus.

== Inheritance and expression ==
The champagne locus is on exon 2 of the SLC36A1 gene, which is on chromosome 14 (ECA14); a single nucleotide polymorphism (SNP) exchanges a C for a G at base 76 (c.188C>G) resulting in a missense mutation. On a protein level, this SNP is predicted to result in the replacement of a threonine with arginine at amino acid 63 (T63R). SLC36A1 is not associated with pigmentation phenotypes in other species, and its role in most tissues is poorly understood. SLC36A1 is a member of a loosely united group of over 300 proteins responsible for active transport and facilitated diffusion called the Solute carrier family. Other members of this family include SLC45A2, which is responsible for pigmentation variations of many types in humans, as well as the cream coat color in horses; and SLC24A5, which is responsible for the Golden dilution in mice.

Dilution genes such as champagne and cream affect the nature or density of the pigments produced by melanocytes. On the other hand, genes in horses which produce white spotting, such as Frame and Sabino1, interrupt or limit the migration of melanocytes from the neural crest. In other words, the skin, eyes, and hair of horses with the champagne mutation do not lack melanocytes, melanosomes, or melanins, but rather exhibit hypomelanism. However, the specific role of SLC36A1 in pigmentation and how the champagne coat colors are created on a molecular level is not known. The researchers who identified the mutation in 2008 suggested that melanosome pH may be affected, which in turn might affect the processing of tyrosine, a critical element of melanogenesis.

There are two alleles in this series: the recessive, wildtype allele ch and the dominant CH. The CH allele represents the T63R SLC36A1 mutation.

- ch/ch recessive homozygotes are not affected by champagne and have no true champagne traits.
- CH/ch heterozygotes have one champagne allele, and one wildtype non-champagne allele. The skin is bright pink and the eyes bright blue at birth, darkening to freckled and hazel with age, respectively. Both red and black pigment in the hair are diluted.
- CH/CH homozygotes (homozygous champagnes) have no wildtype non-champagne alleles. Such horses are indistinguishable from heterozygotes, except that their freckles may slightly sparser and the coat slightly lighter.

The DNA test for champagne detects the c.188C>G mutation on SLC36A1.

== See also ==
- Cream gene
- Dilution gene
- Dun gene
- Equine coat color
- Equine coat color genetics
- Pearl gene
- Silver dapple gene
