= Chestnut (horse color) =

Horse coat color

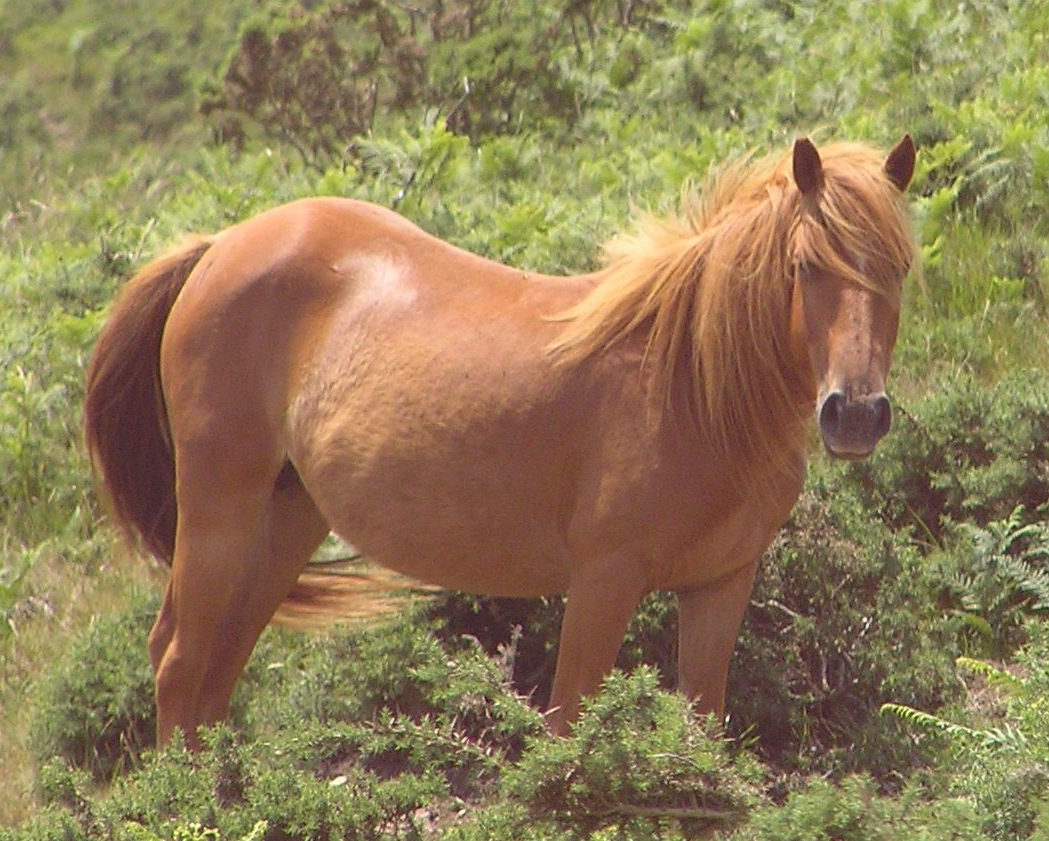
- A chestnut horse
- Other names: Red, sorrel, chesnut
- Variants: Flaxen, Liver chestnut

Genotype
- Base color: Recessive extension "e"
- Modifying genes: none
- Description: reddish-brown color uniform over entire body other than markings

Phenotype
- Body: reddish-brown
- Head and Legs: same as body, occasionally lighter
- Mane and tail: flaxen to brown
- Skin: Usually black, may be lighter at birth in some breeds
- Eyes: Brown, eyes may be lighter at birth

Chestnut is a hair coat color of horses consisting of a reddish-to-brown coat with a mane and tail the same or lighter in color than the coat. Chestnut is characterized by the absolute absence of true black hairs. It is one of the most common horse coat colors, seen in almost every breed of horse.

Chestnut is a very common coat color but the wide range of shades can cause confusion. The lightest chestnuts may be mistaken for palominos, while the darkest shades can be so dark they appear black. Chestnuts have dark brown eyes and black skin, and typically are some shade of red or reddish brown. The mane, tail, and legs may be lighter or darker than the body coat, but unlike the bay they are never truly black. Like any other color of horse, chestnuts may have pink skin with white hair where there are white markings, and if such white markings include one or both eyes, the eyes may be blue. Chestnut foals may be born with pinkish skin, which darkens shortly afterwards.

Chestnut is produced by a recessive gene. Unlike many coat colors, chestnut can be true-breeding; that is, assuming they carry no recessive modifiers like pearl or mushroom, the mating between two chestnuts will produce chestnut offspring every time. This can be seen in breeds such as the Suffolk Punch and Haflinger, which are exclusively chestnut. Other breeds including the American Belgian Draft and Budyonny are predominantly chestnut. However, a chestnut horse need not have two chestnut parents. This is especially apparent in breeds like the Friesian horse and Ariegeois pony which have been selected for many years to be uniformly black, but on rare occasions still produce chestnut foals.

== Visual identification ==
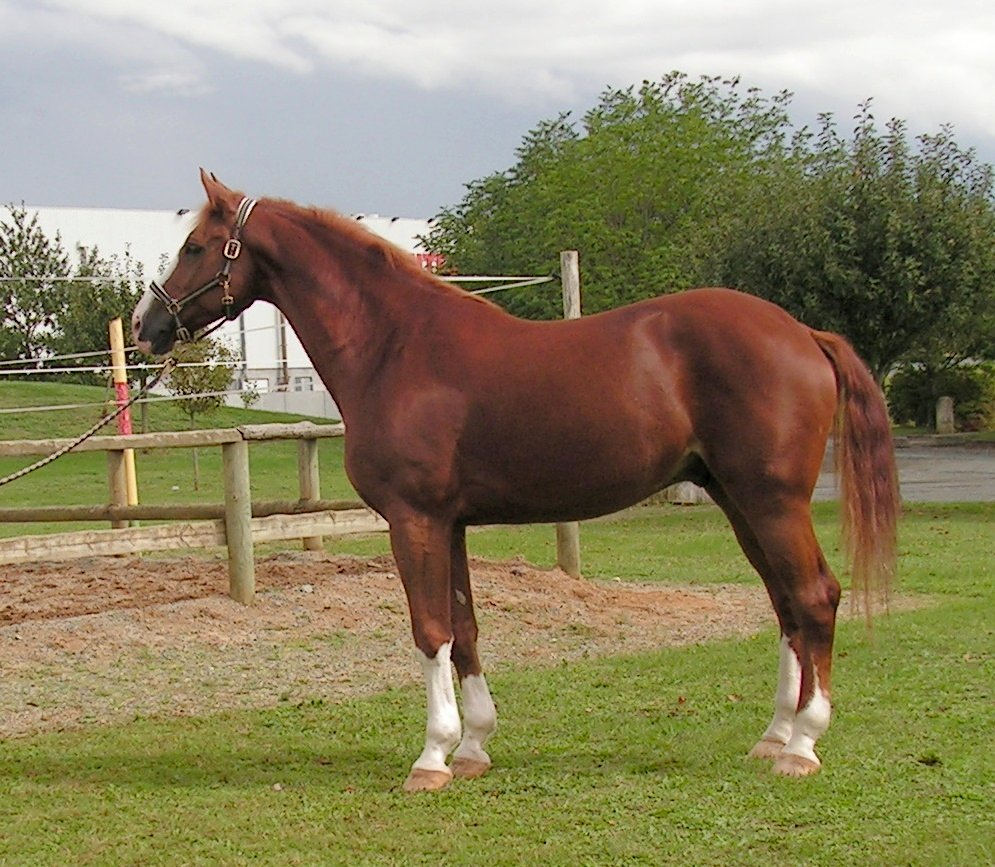
A chestnut horse with white markings

Chestnuts can vary widely in shade and different terms are sometimes used to describe these shades, even though they are genetically indistinguishable. Collectively, these coat colors are usually called "red" by geneticists.

- A basic chestnut or "red" horse has a solid copper-reddish coat, with a mane and tail that is close to the same shade as the body coat.
- Sorrel is a term used by American stock horse registries to describe red horses with manes and tails the same shade or lighter than the body coat color. In these registries, chestnut describes the darker shades of red-based coats.

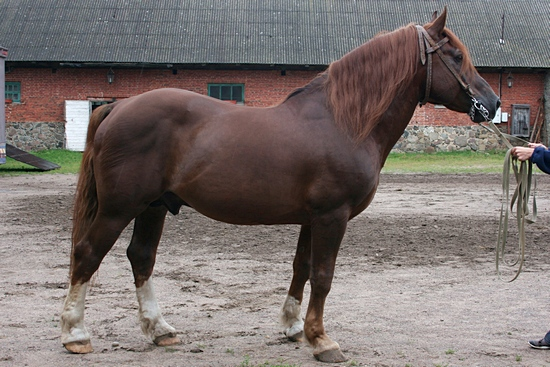
A liver chestnut

- Liver chestnut or dark chestnut are not a separate genetic color, but a descriptive term. The genetic controls for the depth of shade are not presently understood. Liver chestnuts are a very dark-reddish brown. Liver chestnuts are included in the term "dark chestnut." The darkest chestnuts, particularly common in the Morgan horse, may be indistinguishable from true black without very careful inspection. Often confusingly called "black chestnuts", they may be identified by small amounts of reddish hair on the lower legs, mane and tail, or by DNA or pedigree testing. Recently, it has been suggested that the trait or traits that produce certain darker shades of chestnut and bay, referred to as "sooty" coloration follow a recessive mode of inheritance.

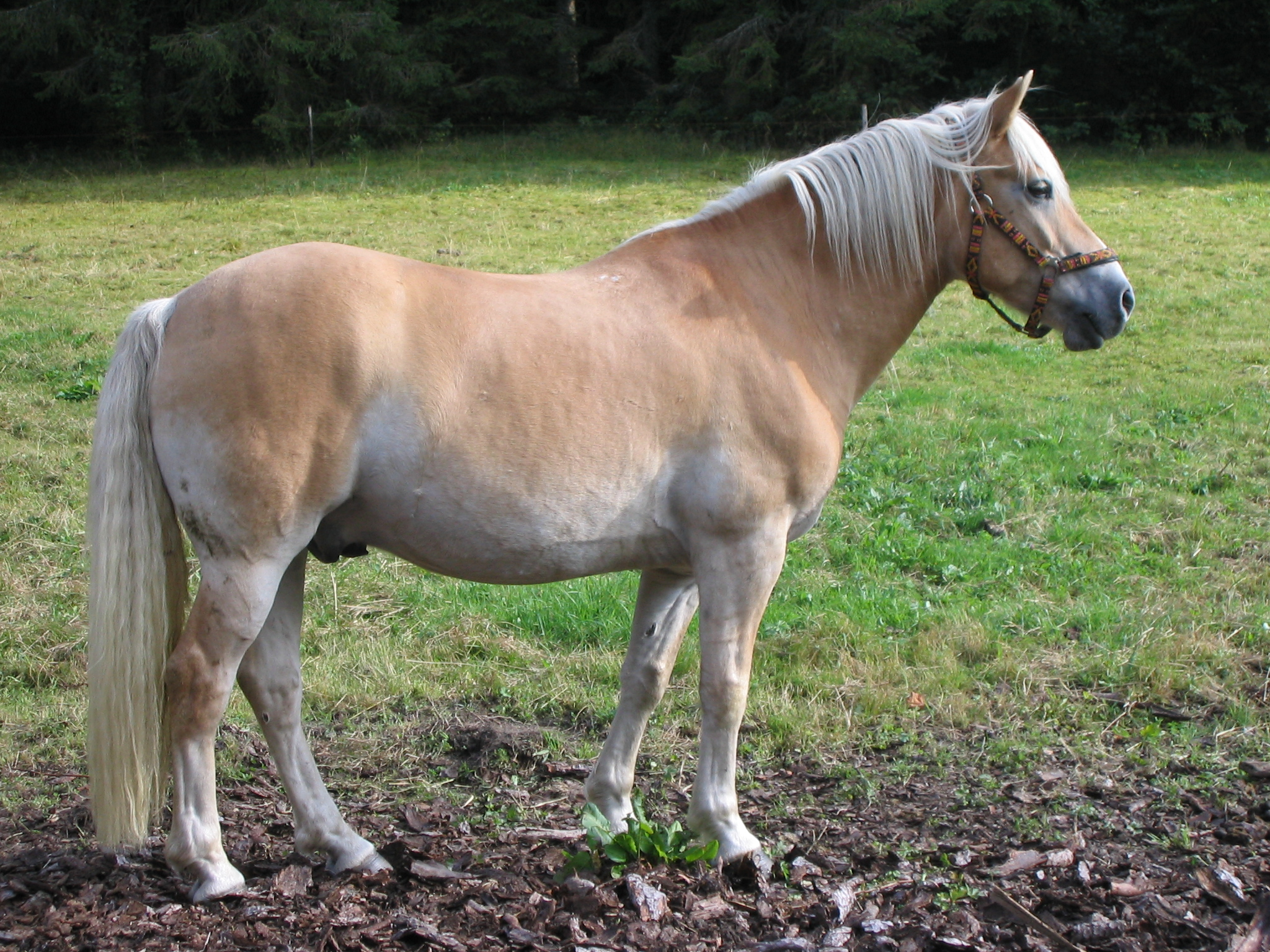
This light, flaxen, mealy chestnut Haflinger might be mistaken for a palomino

- Flaxen chestnut and blond chestnut are terms that describe manes and/or tails that are flaxen, or significantly lighter than the body color. Sometimes this difference is only a shade or two, but other flaxen chestnuts have near-white or silverish manes and tails. Haflingers are exclusively of this shade. It is considered desirable in other breeds, though the genetic mechanism is not fully understood. Some flaxen chestnuts can be mistaken for palominos and have been registered in palomino color registries.
- Pangaré or mealy is thought to be controlled by a single gene, unrelated to chestnut color, and produces distinct characteristics common to wild equids: pale hairs around the eyes and muzzle and a pale underside. Haflingers and Belgians are examples of mealy chestnuts. The flaxen characteristic is sometimes associated with pangaré.

== Chestnut family colors ==
Chestnut is considered a "base color" in the discussion of equine coat color genetics. Additional coat colors based on chestnut are often described in terms of their relationship to chestnut:

- Palominos have a chestnut base coat color that is genetically modified to a golden shade by a single copy of the incomplete dominant cream gene. Palominos can be distinguished from chestnuts by the lack of true red tones in the coat; even the palest chestnuts have slight red tints to their hair rather than gold. The eyes of chestnuts are usually dark brown, while those of a palomino are sometimes a slightly lighter amber. Some color breed registries that promote palomino coloring have accepted flaxen chestnuts because registration is based on a physical description rather than a genetic identity.
- Cremellos have a chestnut base coat and homozygous (two copies) for the cream gene. They have a cream-colored coat, blue eyes and lightly pigmented pink skin.
- Red duns have a chestnut base coat with the dun gene (one or two copies). Their body color is pale, dusty tan shade that resembles the light undercoat color of a body-clipped chestnut but with a bold, dark dorsal stripe in dark red, a red mane, tail and legs. They may have additional primitive markings, which distinguish a red dun from a light or body-clipped chestnut.
- Gold champagnes have a chestnut base coat with the champagne gene (one or two copies). They resemble a palomino, or they may be an all-over apricot shade, but can be distinguished from other colors by amber or green eyes and lightened skin color with freckling.
- Red or "strawberry" roans have a chestnut base coat with the classic roan gene (one or two copies).
- A skewbald, "chestnut pinto" or "sorrel Paint" is a pinto horse with chestnut and white patches.

Combinations of multiple dilution genes do not always have consistent names. For example, "dunalinos" are chestnuts with both the dun gene and one copy of the cream gene.

== Chestnut mimics ==
- Bay horses also have reddish coats, but they have a black mane, tail, legs and other point coloration. The presence of true black points, even if obscured by white markings, means that a horse is not chestnut.
- Seal brown or dark bay horses are not chestnut but may be confused with a liver chestnut. Those unfamiliar with horse coat color terminology often call most horses "brown". including chestnuts. Brown, which may be difficult to distinguish visually from dark bay, is always accompanied by black points. Liver chestnuts, in particular, are mistakenly called brown or "seal brown".
- Silver bay horses typically have chocolate- to red-brown bodies with silvered mane, tail, and legs. The flat reddish-brown color and lack of easily identified black points can confuse even knowledgeable horse persons. Silver dapple horses usually hint at black or dark gray pigment at the roots of the mane and tail, and where their silver points end on the legs. Silvers look a bit "off"-chestnut. To further confuse matters, some flaxen chestnuts have silverish streaks in their manes and tails. However, genetic testing can clarify matters.

== Inheritance and expression ==
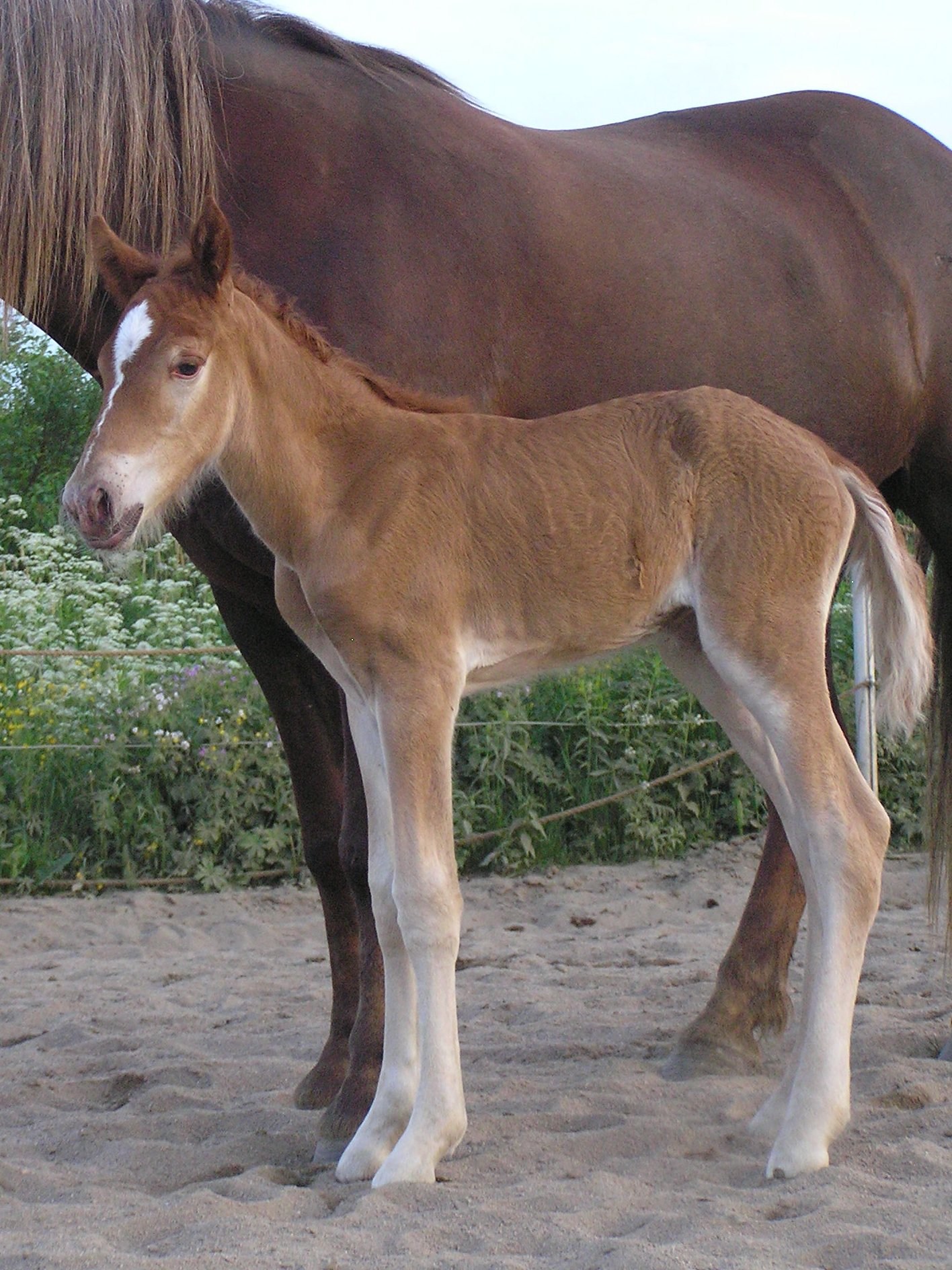
A young chestnut foal, showing slight lightening of skin, possibly related to the pheomelaninistic characteristics of chestnut genetics. The skin will darken as the foal becomes older. Skin depigmentation is not always seen in chestnut foals.

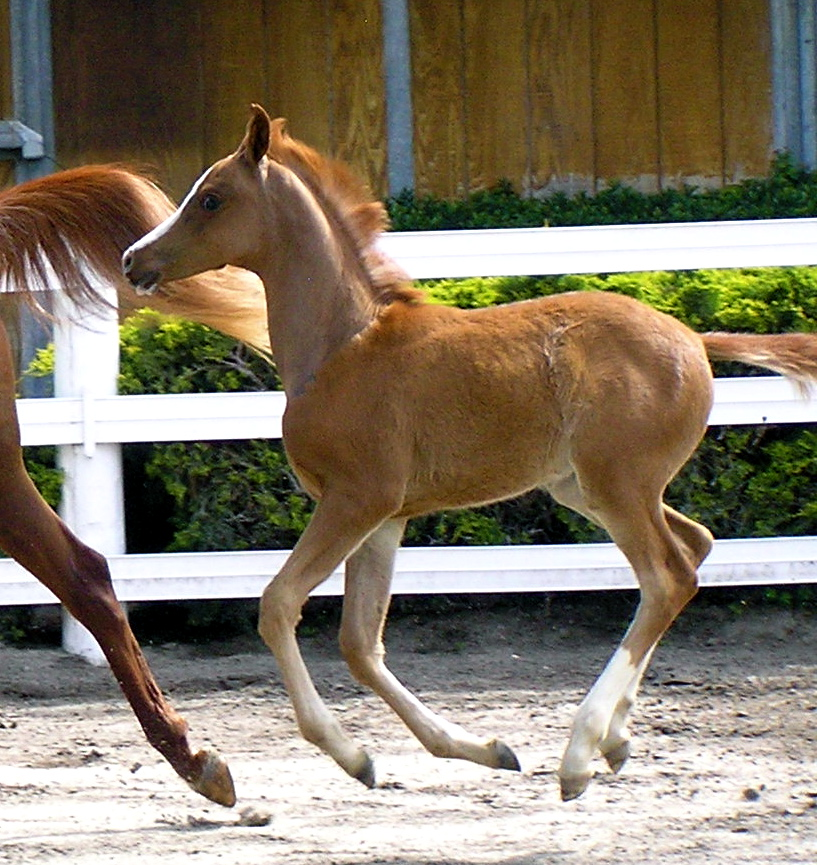
A chestnut foal with body-clipped head and neck, showing two-toned hair shaft, lighter at the roots

The chestnut or sorrel color, genetically considered "red", is caused by one of two recessive alleles at the extension locus (genetics). Extension has three known alleles: the wildtype "E", necessary for the bay and black coat colors, plus two mutations "e" and "e^{a}", both of which are capable of causing the chestnut color. Each individual horse has two copies of the extension gene. If either copy is "E", then the horse will be bay- or black-based. But if the two copies are any combination of "e" and "e^{a}" (e/e, e/e^{a}, or e^{a}/e^{a}), then the horse will be red-based. Alternate extension "e^{a}" is rare and there is no known difference in appearance between it and the more common "e".

Because the red color is recessive, two bay or black parents can produce a chestnut foal if both carry "e" or "e^{a}". However, two chestnut parents cannot produce a bay or black foal.

The extension locus (genetics) is found on chromosome 3 (ECA3) and is part of the gene that codes for the equine melanocortin 1 receptor (MC1R). This receptor is part of a signalling pathway which when activated causes melanocytes to produce eumelanin, or black pigment, instead of pheomelanin, or red pigment. The two mutant alleles "e" and "e^{a}" code for dysfunctional receptors unable to activate this pathway, so absent "E", only red pigment can be produced. At least one copy of the functional "E" allele is required to activate the signal and produce black pigment. (Despite this being how it works in theory, hair samples from dark areas of liver chestnut and dark red chestnut horses were found to contain both types of melanin.) In general, alleles that create fully functional MC1R proteins are inherited dominantly and result in a black-based coat color ("E"), while mutated alleles that create "dysfunctional" MC1R are recessive and result in a lighter coat color ("e").

Normally MC1R would bind to the Melanocyte-stimulating hormone (MSH) which is released by the pituitary gland and stimulates the production and release of melanin in skin and hair. Red hair color in horses ("e") is created by a missense mutation in the code for MC1R, which results in a protein that cannot bind to MSH. When only mutant copies ("e) of the gene are available, non-functional MC1R proteins are produced. As a result, no black pigment is deposited into the hair and the entire coat is red-based. However, the skin of chestnut horses is still generally black, unless affected by other genes. Some chestnut foals are also born with lighter eyes and lightened skin, which darken not long after birth. This is not the same as the blue eyes and pink skin seen at birth in foals carrying the champagne gene. It is a genetic mechanism not fully understood, but may be related to the pheomelanistic characteristics of "e".

Though "E" allows the production of black pigment, it can also allow for red pigment in some parts of the animal as seen in bay horses. This happens when it is locally antagonized by the agouti signalling peptide (ASIP), or agouti gene, which "suppresses" black color and allows some red pigment to be formed.

== See also ==
- Equine coat color
- Equine coat color genetics
