= Pearl gene =

Type of dilution gene affecting horse coat color

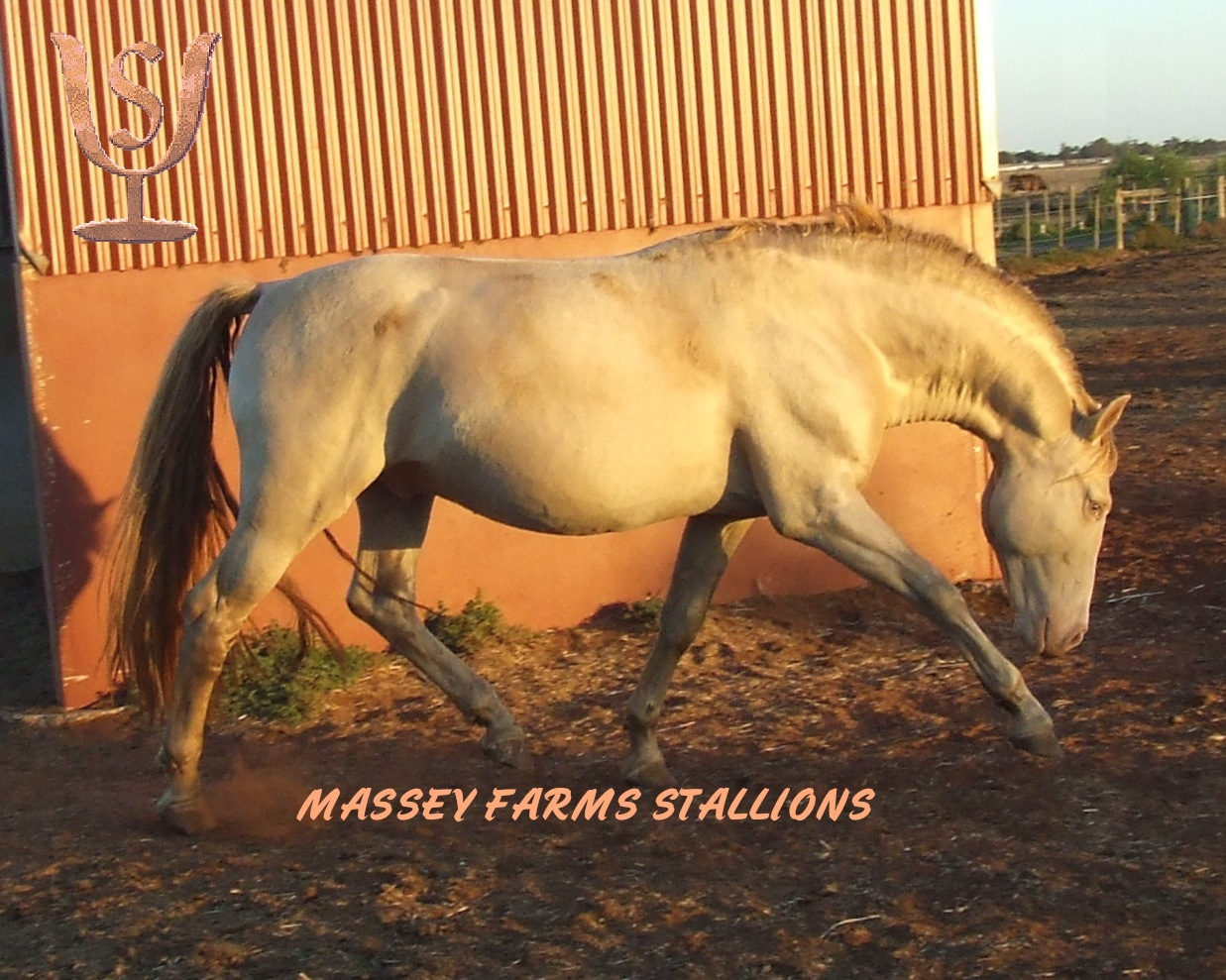
Pseudo-double dilute from action of pearl gene

The Pearl gene, also known as the "Barlink factor", is a dilution gene at the same locus as the cream gene, which somewhat resembles the cream gene and the champagne gene but is unrelated to champagne. It is a somewhat rare dilution gene found in the American Quarter Horse, American Paint Horse, and Peruvian Paso. The same mutation appears in Iberian horse breeds such as the Lusitano and Pura Raza Española, PRE, often referred to as Andalusian. The existence of the pearl gene in Quarter Horses and Paints is probably because these breeds have some Iberian ancestors.

It is a recessive gene. If there is only one copy of the gene, it has no effect on black, bay or chestnut horses. If there are two copies, it lightens red coats to a pale, uniform apricot color that includes body, mane and tail and creates pale skin. Because of this effect, when research was underway to locate the specific gene involved, it was at one time referred to as the "apricot" gene.

The Pearl gene is also known to interact with the cream gene to enhance its effects and, in horses with only one copy of the cream allele, to create "pseudo-double dilutes" sometimes called pseudo-cremellos or pseudo-smoky cream. A pseudo-double dilute will often have pale skin and blue or green eyes. Unlike the double cream dilute and the Pearl-cream pseudo dilute the double Pearl dilute typically has dark tan eyes. It is difficult if not impossible to tell a double cream dilute from a Pearl-cream pseudo dilute without genetic testing. Pearl is found at SLC45A2 (also called MATP), the same locus as cream, sunshine, and snowdrop.

In the American Paint Horse breed, the dilution was called the "Barlink factor" because it was linked to a mare named My Tontime, and her grandson, the stallion Barlink Macho Man, a chestnut splashed white. Initially, the gene in Paints and Quarter Horses was thought to be a different allele than that in the Iberian breeds, but research demonstrated that it was the same gene.
