= Silver dapple gene =

Type of dilution gene affecting horse coat color

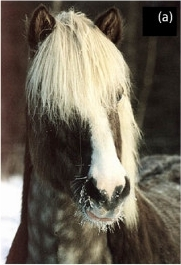
Black silver horse exhibiting strongly diluted long hair with darker roots and flat gray, dappled body color

The silver or silver dapple (Z) gene is a dilution gene that affects the black base coat color and is associated with Multiple Congenital Ocular Abnormalities. It will typically dilute a black mane and tail to a silvery gray or flaxen color, and a black body to a chocolaty brown, sometimes with dapples. It is responsible for a group of coat colors in horses called "silver dapple" in the west, or "taffy" in Australia. The most common colors in this category are black silver and bay silver, referring to the respective underlying coat color.

Mature black silvers typically have sooty white or silver manes and tails with a flat, non-fading, dark grey or grey-brown body coat. The body coat frequently exhibits dapples, rings of lighter-colored hair.

Mature bay silvers retain their reddish bodies, though the presence of small amounts of silver often gives them a chocolate appearance. The mane and tail are usually a sooty silver, darker at the roots, and the legs are usually a flat, brownish-grey mottled with silver. The hair around the eyes and muzzle may also show signs of silvering.

Silver dapple foals can be difficult to identify, but commonly have a pale, wheat-colored body coat, white eyelashes, and hooves with tapering vertical stripes. These characteristics fade over time.

Red-based horses, such as chestnuts and chestnuts with other dilution factors (such as palominos, and cremello) may carry the silver dapple gene, and may pass it on to their offspring, but will not express the gene in their own body color.

== Silver mimics ==
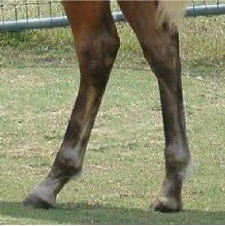
The points of a bay are black, while those of a silver bay (shown here) are silver.

- Gray: While gray horses grow progressively lighter, silver dapples often darken with age. A silver dapple masked by gray (i.e. carries both genes and, because gray is a dominant gene, becomes white with age) may be identified by use of DNA testing.
- Liver chestnut: Silver dapples, especially bay silvers, are frequently misidentified as liver chestnuts or flaxen chestnuts. Flaxen manes and tails in chestnuts tend to have honey or red tones, while the pale manes and tails of silver dapples are soot-toned and darker at the roots. Liver chestnuts also lack the grey-brown dappling on the lower legs. The darkest liver chestnuts often have a kind of marbling on the lower legs, though this hair, too, should show red or yellow tones. Overall, chestnuts of all shades have red-yellow character to their coats, while silver bays recall grey-brown. Knowledge of the pedigree of the horse in question is often useful: two chestnut-based parents cannot produce a silver bay or silver black. DNA testing can be used in the most difficult cases.
- "Sooty" palomino: Dark palominos may be hard to distinguish from silver dapples, particularly if the mane or tail of a palomino contain streaks of silver. A true palomino, with a red-based coat, will exhibit yellow or gold tones; a silver horse, in contrast, is by definition black-based and exhibits gray, black or brown undertones. A sooty palomino, like other creme dilutes, may have brown eyes a shade lighter than average, but this is not true of silver dapples. When actual color is in question, pedigree information or a DNA test can help clarify matters.

== Prevalence ==
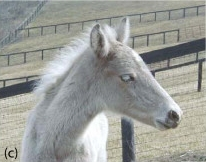
Silver dapple foal exhibiting typical wheat-colored coat and pale eyelashes

Many breeds do not possess the silver dapple gene. The coat color is traditionally associated with the Rocky Mountain Horse and the Miniature Horse. Scandinavian breeds and their descendants such as the Icelandic horse, Nordland Pony, Shetland Pony, Welsh Mountain Pony, Welsh Pony, Swedish Warmblood, Estonian native horse and Finnhorse are also found in the silver dapple colors. American horse breeds known to have the silver gene include the Morgan, American Saddlebred, Missouri Foxtrotter, Tennessee Walking Horse, and the American Quarter Horse. European draft breeds such as the Comtois and Ardennais also occur in silver. Historically the color was found in the Dutch Groningen, but the breed was crossbred to produce the Dutch Warmblood and underwent subsequent genetic bottlenecking, so the gene may no longer be present.

== Inheritance and expression ==
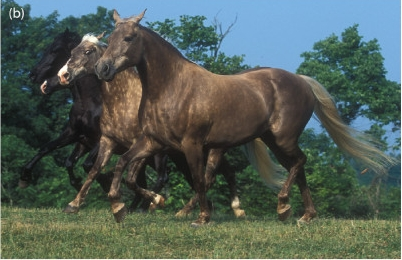
The front two Rocky Mountain Horses have the silver dapple dilution.

The silver dapple trait is caused by a missense mutation (labeled Z) in the PMEL17 gene on horse chromosome 6. It is transmitted by autosomal dominant inheritance (simple dominance). PMEL17 is active from quite early in embryonic development through to the mature cell's melanosome and is involved with the production of the black pigment eumelanin.

Melanins, which provide color in the eyes, skin, and hair, are found in two types: eumelanin, which produces black to brown pigment, and phaeomelanin, which produces red to yellow pigment. Most horses can produce both types; the brown appearance of a bay horse's coat is caused by alternating bands of eumelanin and phaeomelanin, for which the agouti gene is responsible. Eumelanin predominates in the legs, mane and tail of bay horses. By contrast, horses which lack a functional agouti gene cannot produce such alternating bands, and thus have wholly black coats with no visible phaeomelanin. Chestnut horses lack the ability to manufacture eumelanin altogether, and so have wholly red coats devoid of true black pigment.

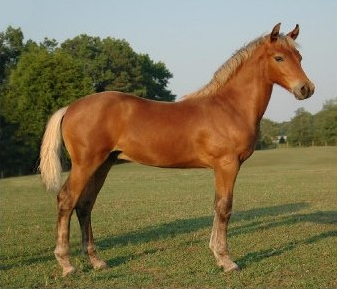
Bay silvers retain their reddish body color with black points diluted to silver.

While the role of PMEL17 is not fully understood, the silver dapple gene exclusively produces dilution, or hypopigmentation, of eumelanin. The dilution changes black into various shades of platinum, silver and flat grey, though the original black-brown character of the color is usually preserved. The effects of the gene are more striking in the mane and tail. Horses with chestnut or chestnut-family coats - such as palomino, red roan, or red dun - are therefore unaffected by the gene and may silently carry it and pass it on to their offspring.

On the template of a black horse, which has a coat rich in eumelanin, the effect is that of complete conversion to varying shades of silver. Often the body remains quite dark while the mane and tail are strongly diluted. On the template of a bay horse, which has eumelanin largely restricted to the points, these points are converted to silver while the phaeomelanic body is mostly unaffected.

An undesirable effect associated with the gene is eye problems, notably multiple congenital ocular anomalies (MCOA). MCOA has multiple clinical signs including a bulbous bulging of the eye, cornea globosa, severe iridal hypoplasia, uveal cysts, cataracts, and in a few cases, retinal detachment. These conditions can be detected via ultrasound examination of the eye. In a 2013 study of Comtois horses and Rocky Mountain Horses, all animals carrying the mutated form of PMEL17 had some eye disorder, though milder problems in animals heterozygous for the allele versus those who were homozygous. None of the control horses of these breeds who lacked the mutated form of PMEL17 had any eye disorder.

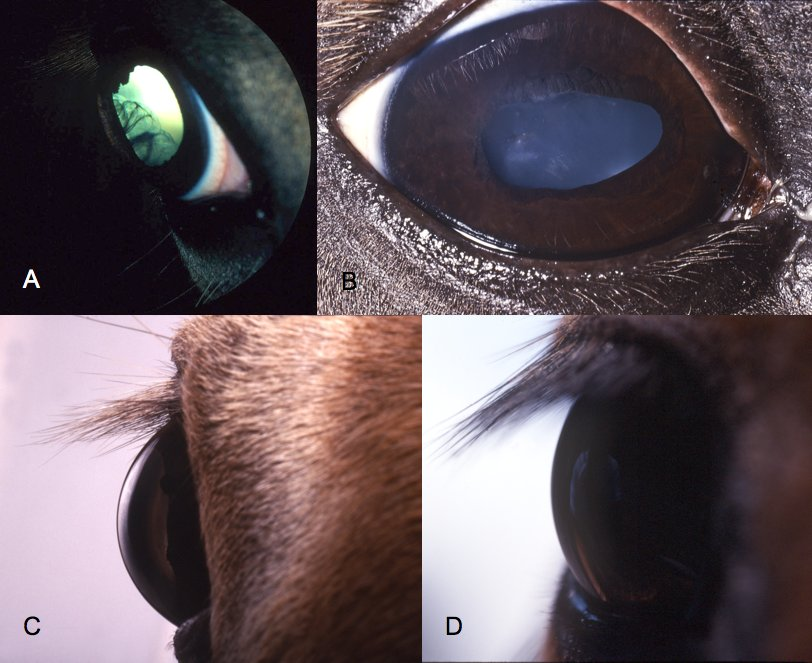
Eye disorders in horses with the silver dapple gene

Similar mutations in other species provide insight into the roles played by the PMEL17 gene. Relatively few such mutations are known, which suggests that the gene is involved in processes critical to survival. Several of the mutations known are related to pigmentation: premature silvering in mice, diluted and white plumage in chickens, and the widely known merle dilution in dogs. The merle coat in dogs is associated with auditory and ophthalmologic disorders, such as deafness and microphthalmia. In Rocky Mountain Horses, the silver dapple color is sometimes associated with Anterior Segment Dysgenesis (ASD) which affects the structures in the face and the front of the eye. Most often, the syndrome presents as benign lesions, though homozygotes may have impaired vision. As ASD is found in non-silver representatives of the breed, it is thought to be physically close to the silver gene and to have come from a silver dapple, ASD-affected foundation ancestor, thus is an example of the Founder effect.

== See also ==
- Equine coat color genetics
- Equine coat color
- Dilution gene
