= Dilution gene =

Gene that lightens the coat colour of certain animals

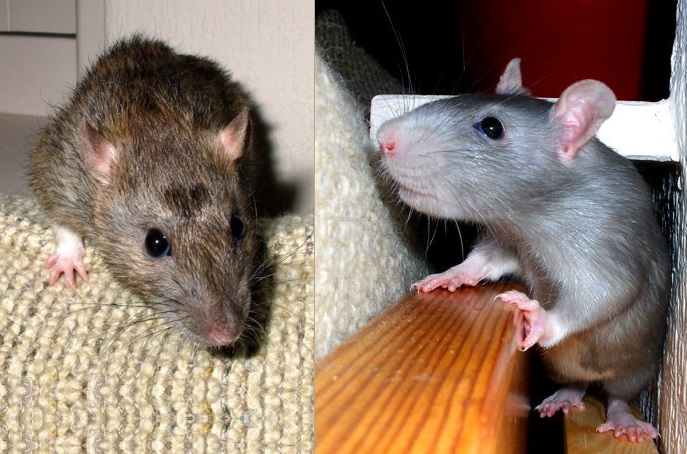
Two rats: left: agouti, right: coat lightened to blue by a dilution gene

A dilution gene is any one of a number of genes that act to create a lighter coat color in living creatures. There are many examples of such genes:

== General ==
Diluted coat colors have melanocytes, but vary from darker colors due to the concentration or type of these pigment-producing cells, not their absence. Pigment dilution, sometimes referred to as hypomelanism, has been called leucism, albinism (perfect, impartial, or dilute), ghosting, paling, and isabellinism.

- Albinism describes a condition where pigment cells synthesize little or no pigment
- Leucism describes a condition that creates loss of pigment cells

== Cats ==
Cat coat genetics discusses many dilution genes in cats.

== Dogs ==
In dogs, a mutation of the MLPH locus known as the dilute gene causes eumelanin to lighten while pheomelanin remains almost unchanged. Dogs of some breeds with the dilute gene often suffer from colour dilution alopecia (CDA).

=== Appearance ===
Of the colour shades found in the coat of dogs, the light brown caused by pheomelanin is hardly affected. Black eumelanin is lightened to a grey called "blue". Chocolate brown eumelanine is lightened to the typical colour of the Weimaraner.

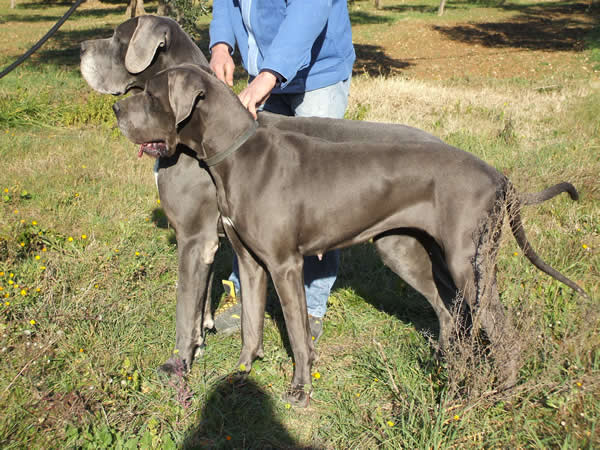
Great Danes lightened from black to blue by the dilute gene.

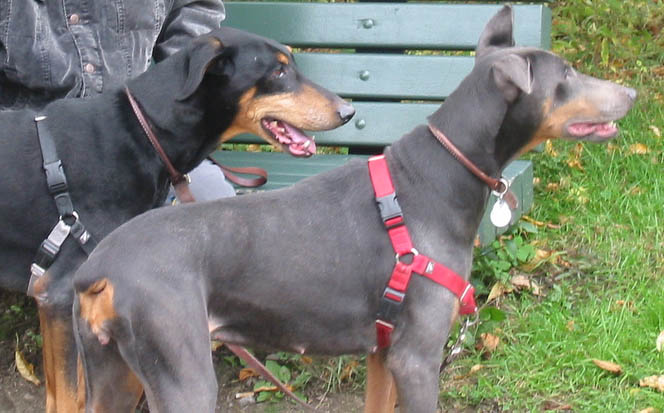
Doberman: black with tan in the back, blue with tan in the front. The light brown areas were hardly lightened at all

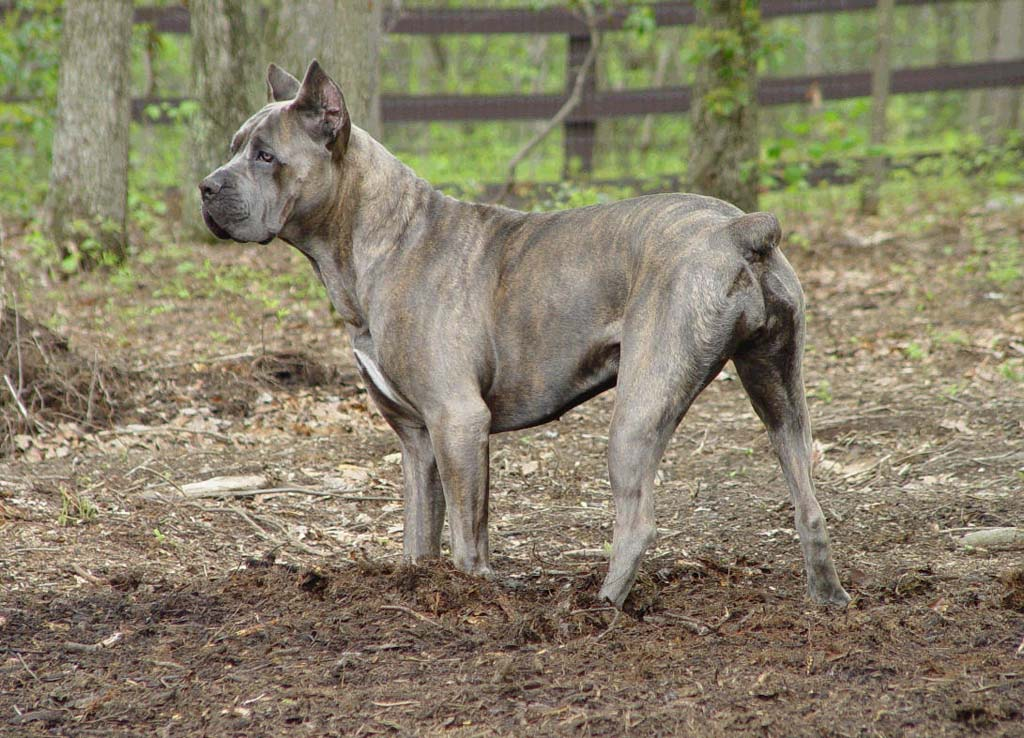
Blue-light brown brindle dog

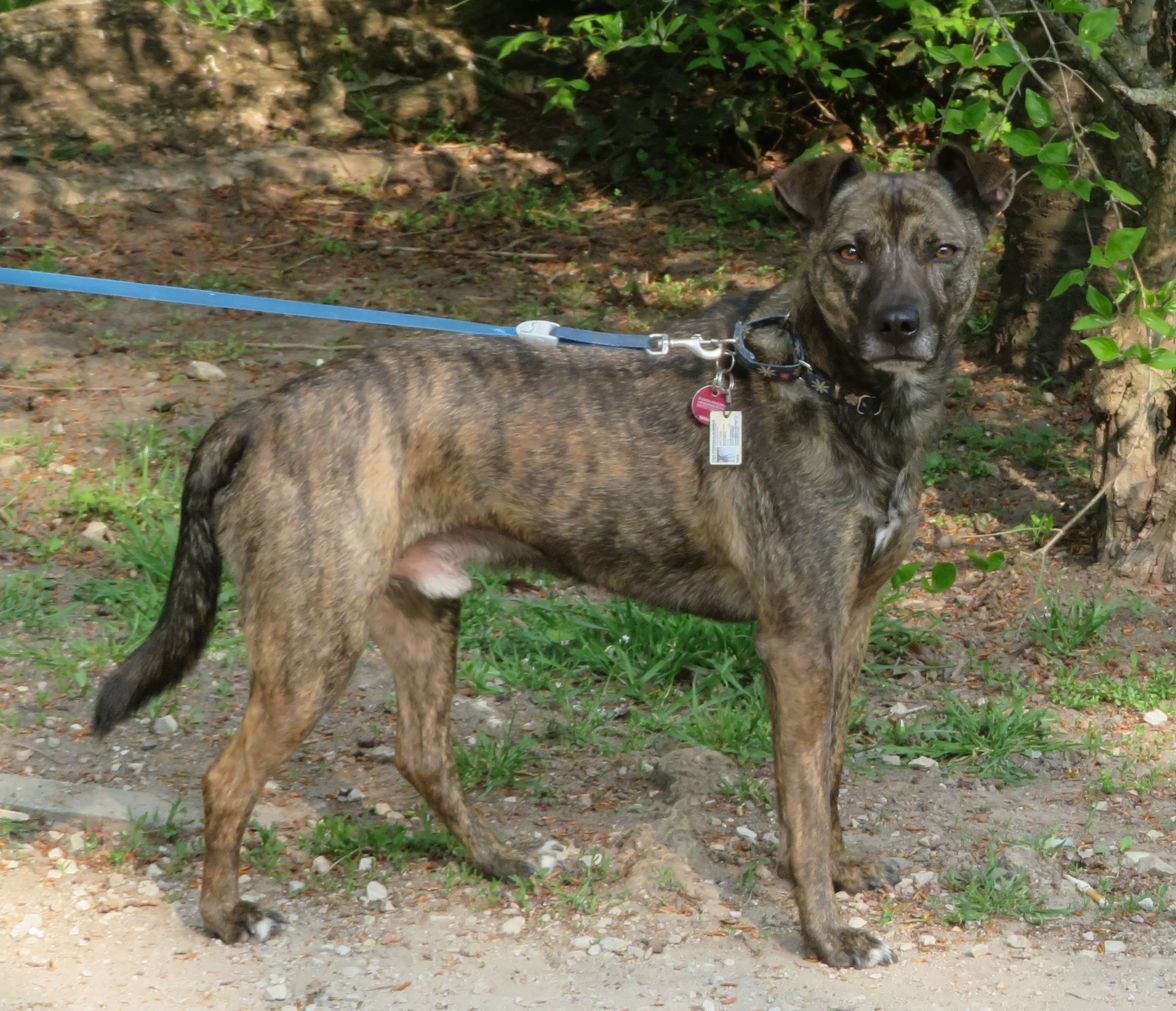
For comparison without dilute gene: black-light brown brindle dog

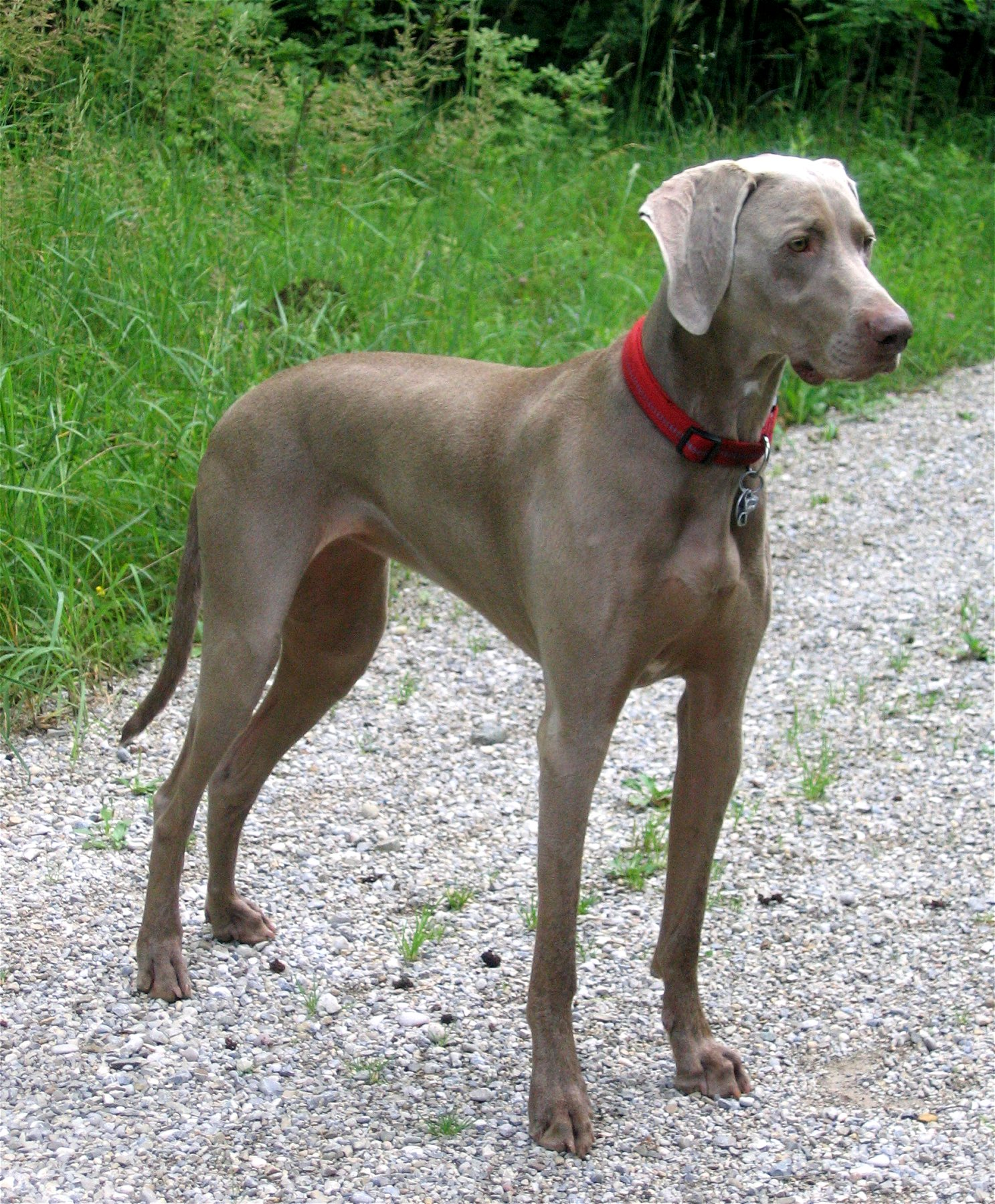
Weimaraner

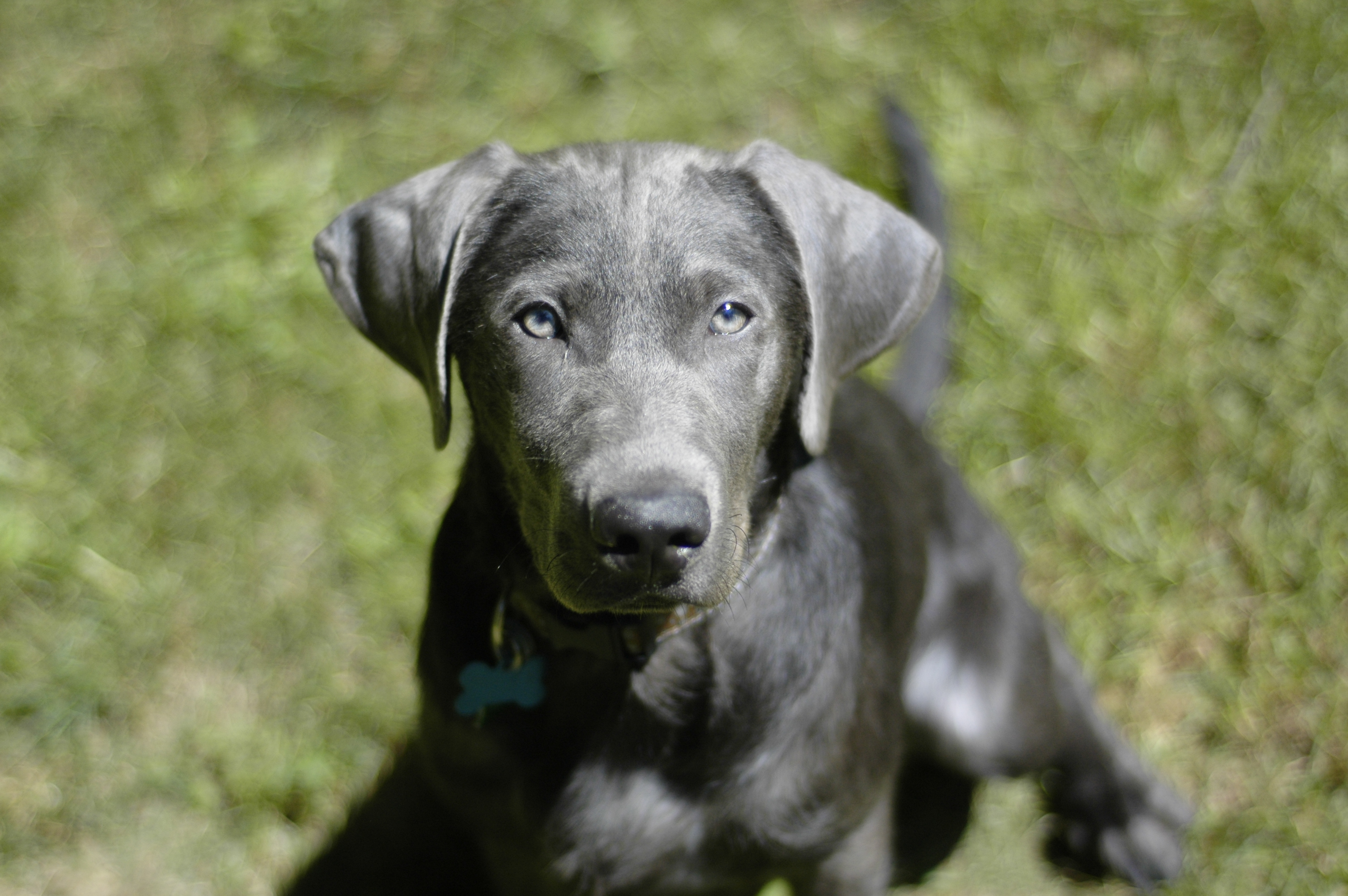
Silver Labrador

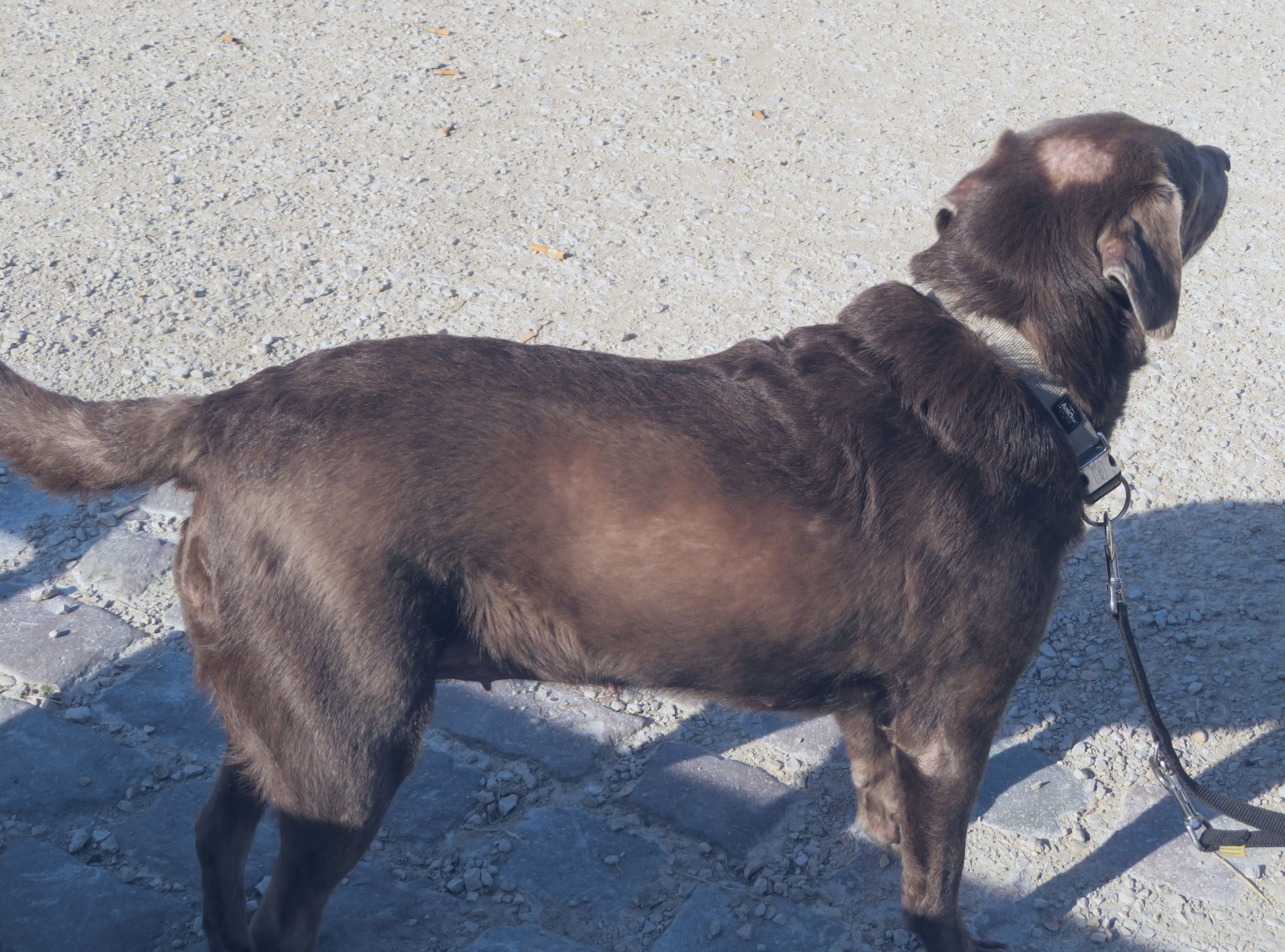
Colour dilution alopecia

=== Genetics ===
The dilute gene d is recessive to the wild type allele D. A gene test can be used to determine a dog's genotype concerning genes for pigmentation. In some dog breeds lightened by the dilute gene, the mutation d is associated with color dilution alopecia (CDA). Since not all breeds in which the gene occurs exhibit these problems, it is suspected that there may be a second previously unknown mutation of the MLPH gene.

Every dog has two alleles - one from the sire and one from the dam. The gene expression depends on the genotype:

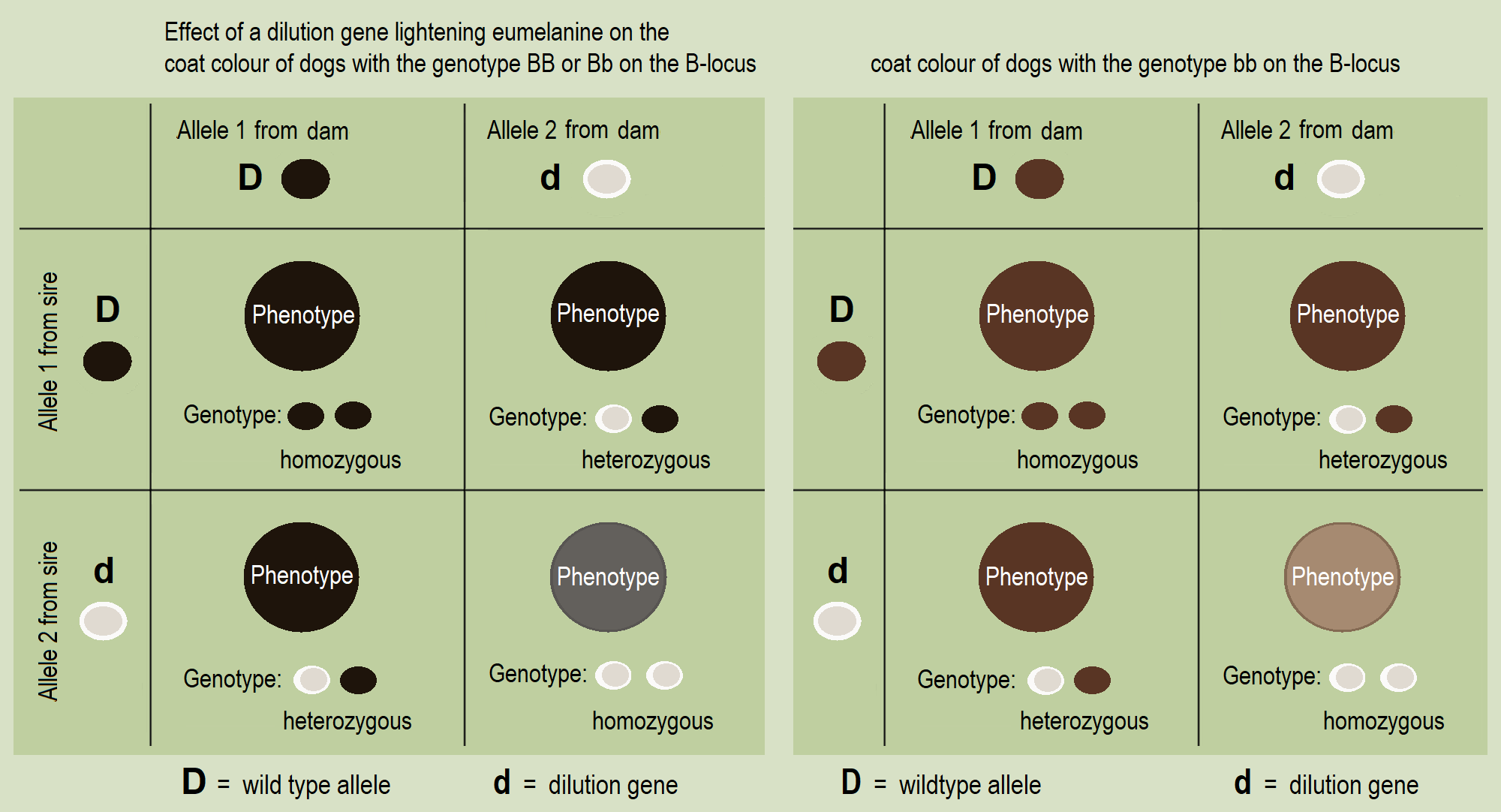
Heredity diagram Left: black eumelanin, right: brown eumelanin

1. DD: Both sire and dam have inherited the wild type allele. The coat is not lightened.
2. Dd: Either sire or dam have inherited the allele for dilution. However, the dilution of colour is not visible in the phenotype - the dog has the same coat colour as a DD dog.
3. dd: Sire and dam have inherited the allele for the dilute colour expression. The black areas of the coat are lightened to blue, dogs additionally lightened by the gene on the B locus take on the colour typical of the Weimaraner.

According to the Mendelian Rules, an average of 25% of the puppies receive the homozygous gene combination dd if both parents are genetic carriers.

== Horses ==
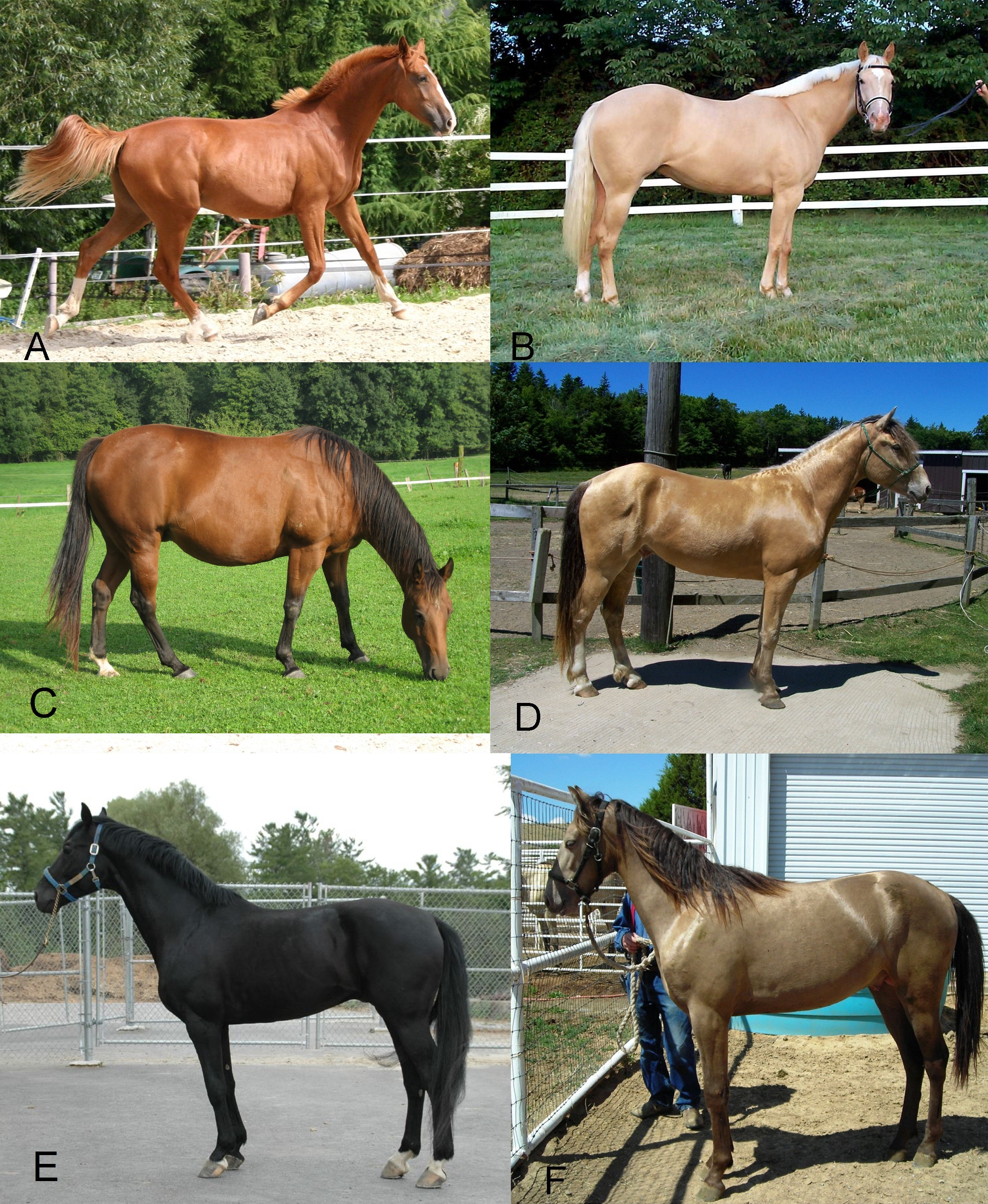
The effect of the champagne dilution gene on different horse coats.

- Equine coat color genetics discusses color genes in horses, including a brief description of dilution genes
- Equine coat color describes various colors in horses
- Cream gene, describes the process for horses by which the cremello, perlino, smoky cream double-dilute colors are created as well as the buckskin, palomino and smoky black single dilute colors.
- Dun gene describes another common dilution gene in horses
- Champagne gene, describes a different dilution gene in horses that also creates cream coloring, pale skin with mottling and light-colored eyes.
- Pearl gene, also called the "Barlink factor", is a recessive gene. One copy of the allele has no effect on the coat color of black, bay or chestnut horses. Two copies on a chestnut horse produce a pale, uniform apricot color of body hair, mane and tail as well as pale skin. It also interacts with Cream dilution to produce "pseudo-double" Cream dilutes with pale skin and blue or green eyes.
- Silver Dapple Gene lightens black hair, such as the mane and tail of a bay horse
- Mushroom (horse) describes an unknown and unmapped theorized dilution gene which dilutes red pigment in body color to a pale beige color.

== See also ==
- wikispecies:Felis sylvestris catus (cat)
- wikispecies:Equus caballus (horse)
