= Agouti (disambiguation) =

Agouti are several rodent species of the genus Dasyprocta.

Agouti may also refer to:

== Biology ==
=== Rodents ===
- Tailed agouti or acouchi, a member of the genus Myoprocta
- Paca, a member of the genus Cuniculus, formerly Agouti

=== Other ===
- Agouti (coloration), fur coloration in which each hair has alternating dark and light bands
- Agouti-signalling protein or ASIP, a circulating hormone encoded by the agouti gene that acts as an antagonist at melanocortin receptors
- Agouti-related peptide, a neuropeptide produced in the brain by the AgRP/NPY neuron
- Agouti coloration genetics, discussing coat colors created by differences in the agouti gene

== Other uses ==
- Agouti (engineering), a propeller cavitation noise reduction system

== See also ==
- Agouta or Hispaniolan solenodon, a solenodon
- Aguti
