= Seal brown (horse) =

Hair coat color of horses

Seal Brown
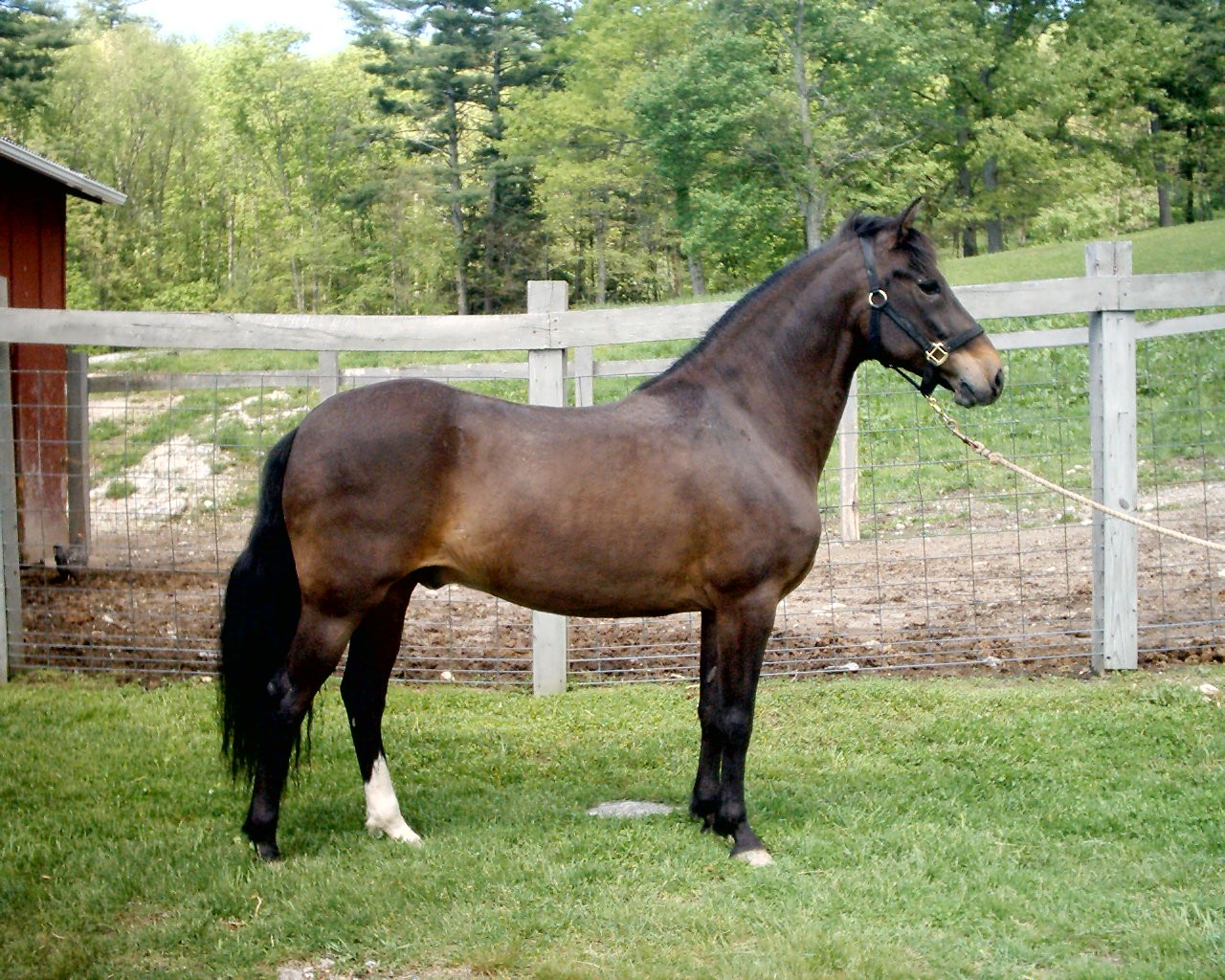
- A seal brown gelding
- Variants: Dark bay, brown
- Description: dark brown body coat with black point coloration and tan coloration around muzzle, eyes, flanks and other "soft" areas. Lacks reddish tint seen in most bay horses

Phenotype
- Body: dark brown with lighter tan coloration at soft points of body
- Head and Legs: Black
- Mane and tail: Black
- Skin: Black
- Eyes: Brown
- Other notes: Not to be confused with pangare

Seal brown is a hair coat color of horses characterized by a near-black body color; with black points, the mane, tail and legs; but also reddish or tan areas around the eyes, muzzle, behind the elbow and in front of the stifle. The term is not to be confused with "brown", which is used by some breed registries to refer to either a seal brown horse or to a dark bay without the additional characteristics of seal brown.

Like bay, the seal brown color lacks the non-agouti mutation that would create a fully black horse. The genetics behind seal brown are not known, but some think it is caused by an allele of agouti called A^{t}. A DNA test said to detect the seal brown (A^{t}) allele was developed, but the test was never subjected to peer review and due to unreliable results was subsequently pulled from the market.

The similar dark bay coat color, which also features black points and a dark body, differs from seal brown by the absence of tan markings. Another mimic is the liver chestnut, an all-over dark brown coat including mane and tail, that is sometimes confused with seal brown. However, true seal browns have black points characteristic of all bay horses, while liver chestnuts do not.

== Identification ==
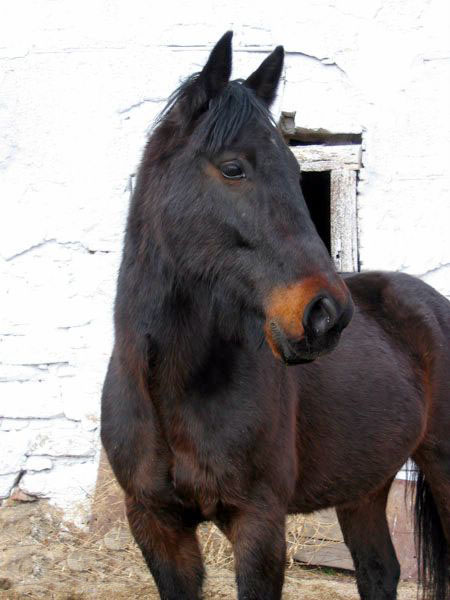
The tan hair around the eyes and muzzle with a very dark body color is typical of seal brown.

Opinions vary on what constitutes a true seal brown as distinct from dark bay. In Equine Color Genetics, Dan Phillip Sponenberg wrote "In general, all dark colors with black points that are lighter than black but darker than bay are called brown." In this text, he classifies black-pointed, clear reddish coats of any shade as bay, and black-pointed coats of any shade with black countershading as brown.

Seal brown is best described as a black or nearly-black coat with reddish or tan hairs on the "soft parts": the muzzle, eyes, inner ears, underbelly, behind the elbow, and in front of the stifle. Like other coat colors, seal browns can range in shade. The very darkest are just about black except for their tan areas. Lighter examples are easily confused with dark bays. The mane, tail, and legs are always black.

== Terminology ==
Non-horse people often refer to many horse coat colors as "brown," in particular the bay color. Among horse aficionados, a common assessment is that "...[the term] is only used by people with one horse or with two hundred." The implication is that lay observers will refer to a horse's coat color to be "brown" due to a lack of vocabulary, and those discussing large populations of horses will use "brown" out of a need for a more specific vocabulary. The term "seal brown" is unlikely to be part of a novice's repertoire and is therefore preferable when discussing this specific coat color. This coat color is, illuminatingly, called "black and tan" in some languages.

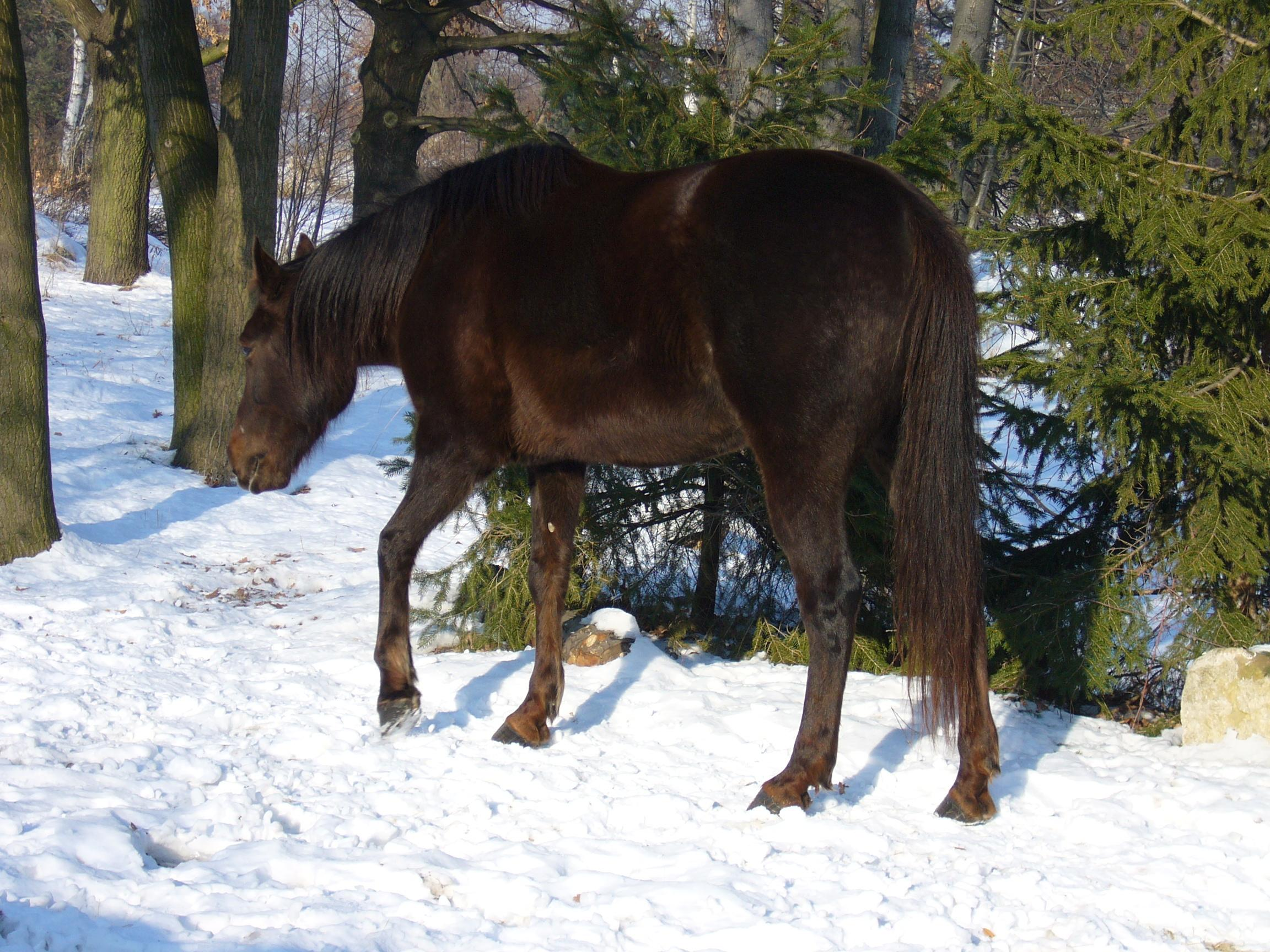
This horse looks "brown", but the non-black lower legs give him away as a dark liver chestnut.

=== "Brown" but not seal brown ===
In the most simple terms, the vast majority of horses are indeed some shade of brown, but not "seal brown." Such coat colors include:

- Chestnut, entirely copper-red to liver-brown, without true black hair.
- Bay, reddish-brown to quite dark-brown body coat with true black mane, tail, and legs; dark bays are hard to distinguish from seal browns by even experienced eyes.
  - Both bay and chestnut may be darkened by the sooty gene.
- Buckskin, tan or gold body coat with the black areas of a bay (above).
- Dun, commonly tan (though rust or slate-like shades exist) with evident primitive markings.
- Silver dapples, sometimes called "chocolate", are often found in brownish shades.

=== Seal browns on paper ===
Not all breed registries or studbooks recognize seal brown as a distinct coat color. The American Quarter Horse Association and American Paint Horse Association both recognize "brown" as a separate category, while the Arabian Horse Association labels all non-black, black-pointed shades "bay."

Still other registries, such as The Jockey Club which registers Thoroughbreds and Appaloosa Horse Club, offer the designation "dark bay or brown" to cope with the ambiguity in terminology and identification. Among historically German breeds and registries, the term rappe indicates a black horse, braun is bay, while dunkelbraun indicates dark bay and schwarzbraun indicates seal brown (literally black-brown). In France, seal brown horses are recognized among the "black coat family".

== Related coat colors ==
The presence of other coat color genes can modify a seal brown coat. The seal brown family includes:

- Brown Buckskin, is a result of the dilution effect of a single copy of the cream gene. Sometimes called smoky brown. The black areas of the seal brown coat are unaffected or slightly lightened, while the reddish areas are more golden. These should not be confused with traditional buckskins.
- Sable champagne, a result of the dilution effect of the champagne gene. Like all champagnes, sable champagnes have hazel eyes and pinkish, freckled skin. The coat is a flat, diluted grayish- or purplish-brown, somewhere between the warm pumpkin tones of the bay-based amber champagne, and the cool purplish tones of the black-based classic champagne.
- Brown dun, a result of the dilution effect of the dun gene. Like all duns, brown duns have conspicuous primitive markings including at least a dorsal stripe and darker points. The primitive markings of brown duns are black, and the coat color is somewhere between the slate gray of a grulla and the tan of a bay dun.

== Genetics of seal brown ==
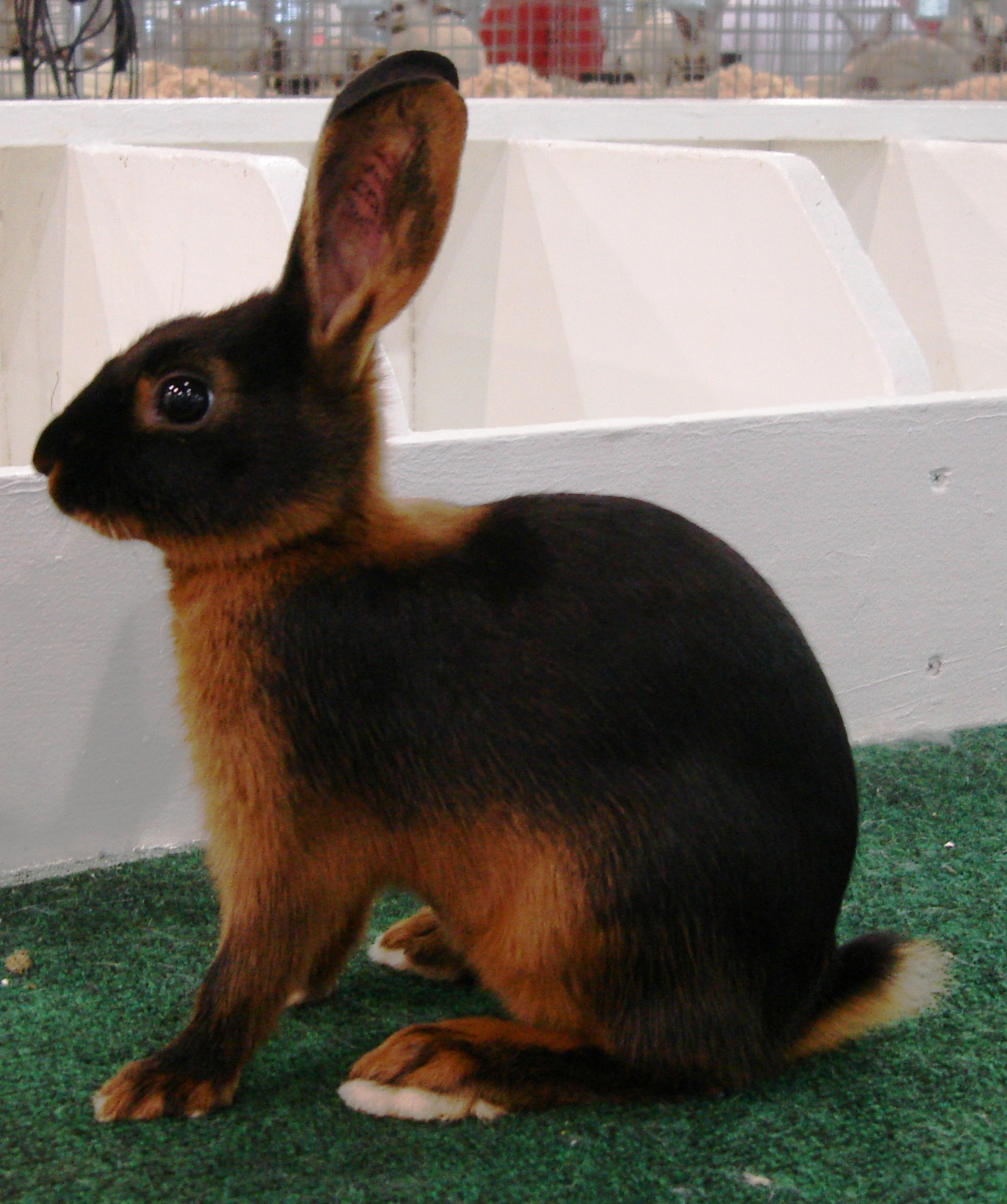
In rabbits and other species, the black and tan color comes from an allele of the agouti gene called a^{t}.

The genetics behind seal brown are not known.

Since 1951, it has been proposed that seal brown was caused by an allele of the agouti gene, given the name a^{t}. This is based on the many other species where similar black-and-tan patterns are caused by alleles at the agouti locus. One genetics lab offered a test for seal brown in 2009, but the underlying studies were not peer-reviewed and the test was pulled from the market due to inconsistent results.

== Former theories about the genetics of seal brown ==
An early version of the currently-accepted equine Agouti gene theory was first presented in 1951 by Miguel Odriozola in A los colores del caballo, subsequently reviewed by William Ernest Castle in Genetics. This theory prevailed until the 1990s, when discoveries of similar conditions in other species provided alternate explanations.

=== Black and pangaré ===
For a period, the seal brown phenotype - black or near-black coat with tan or red hairs on the soft areas - was described as a true black coat affected by pangaré, or mealy-factor. Pangaré is a quality common to the Przewalski's horse and so-called primitive horse breeds such as the Exmoor Pony. The trait is characterized by pale hairs, typically off-white to light tan, around the eyes, muzzle, and underside of the body.

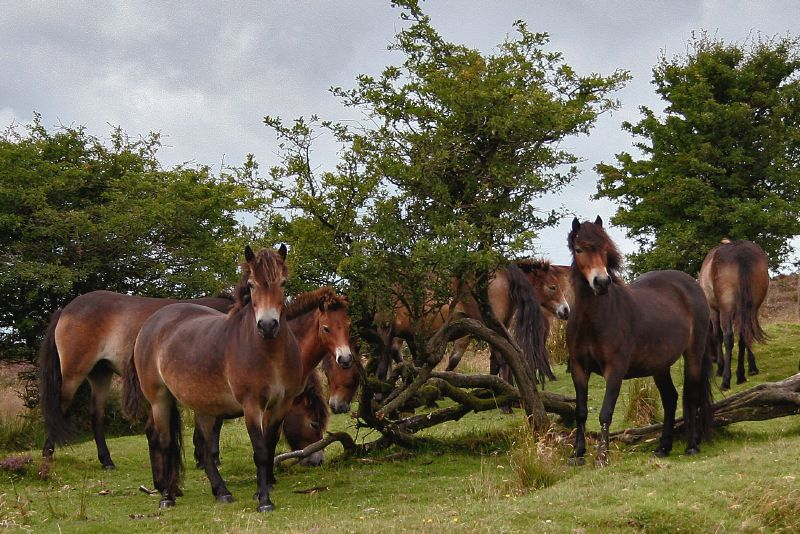
These Exmoor ponies may be dark bay or seal brown, but exhibit pangaré, which is pale in comparison to the reddish areas on a seal brown.

This theory was discarded when the equine Agouti gene (ASIP) was sequenced in 2001, finding that horses fitting the seal brown phenotype did not possess the homozygous recessive a/a Agouti genotype.

=== Tyrosinase-brown ===
Tyrosinase-related protein 1 (TYRP1) is a protein involved in melanin synthesis, and is encoded by the TYRP1 gene, also called the brown (b) locus. In humans, mutations in the TYRP1 gene account for variations in "normal" skin, hair and eye coloration, as well as types of clinical Albinism. Mutations in the TYRP1 gene of other mammals result in various reddish-brown coat color phenotypes: Brown in mice, Chocolate in cats, Chocolate in dogs, and Dun in cattle.

The phenotypes associated with TYRP1 mutations are typically rufous or chocolate rather than the black-dominated coats of seal brown horses, and usually result in pinkish-brown skin and light eyes. This is not the case for seal brown horses, and the role of TYRP1 in seal brown was ruled out after it was sequenced in 2001.

=== Extension-brown and dominant black ===
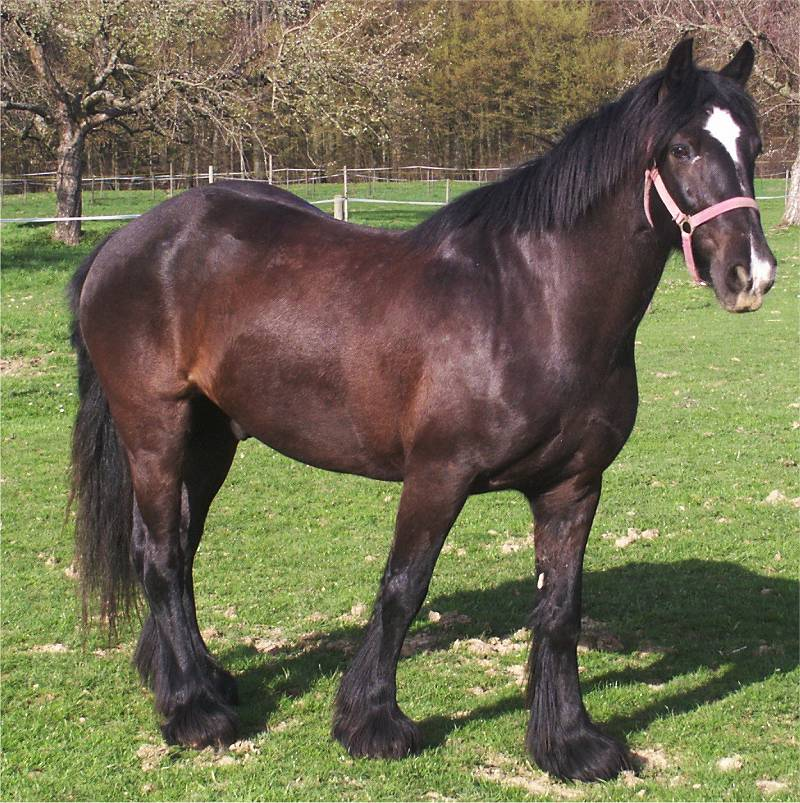
Faded black horses (a/a), may be mistaken for seal brown or dark bay.

The allure of a pure black coat on a horse has struck horse breeders for centuries, resulting in all-black breeds like the Friesian horse. The breeding of pure black horses is attended by two problems: some black coats fade with exposure to light and sweat, and breeding two "black" horses together would sometimes produce non-black horses. In some cases, faded true black horses have lighter coats than the darkest near-black horses.

To account for this, W.E. Castle postulated that there was a third allele at the Extension locus: E^{D} or "dominant black". Based on the existence of such conditions in other animals, Castle suggested that the dominant black gene (E^{D}) would override the "points" pattern of dominant Agouti (A) and produce black or near-black horses, which could then go on to have bay offspring. The implication was that the seal brown coat color, which is often quite nearly black, could be produced by this allele.

Similarly, Sponenberg once hypothesized an Extension-brown (E^{B}) allele, dominant over the wildtype E. He described an allele responsible for black countershading, or sootiness, which would distinguish all shades of brown from all shades of bay.

Both theories were laid to rest after the characterization of the equine MC1R or Extension, which showed no such alleles. However, it remains likely that a genetic control for sootiness does exist.

== Dark bay vs. seal brown ==
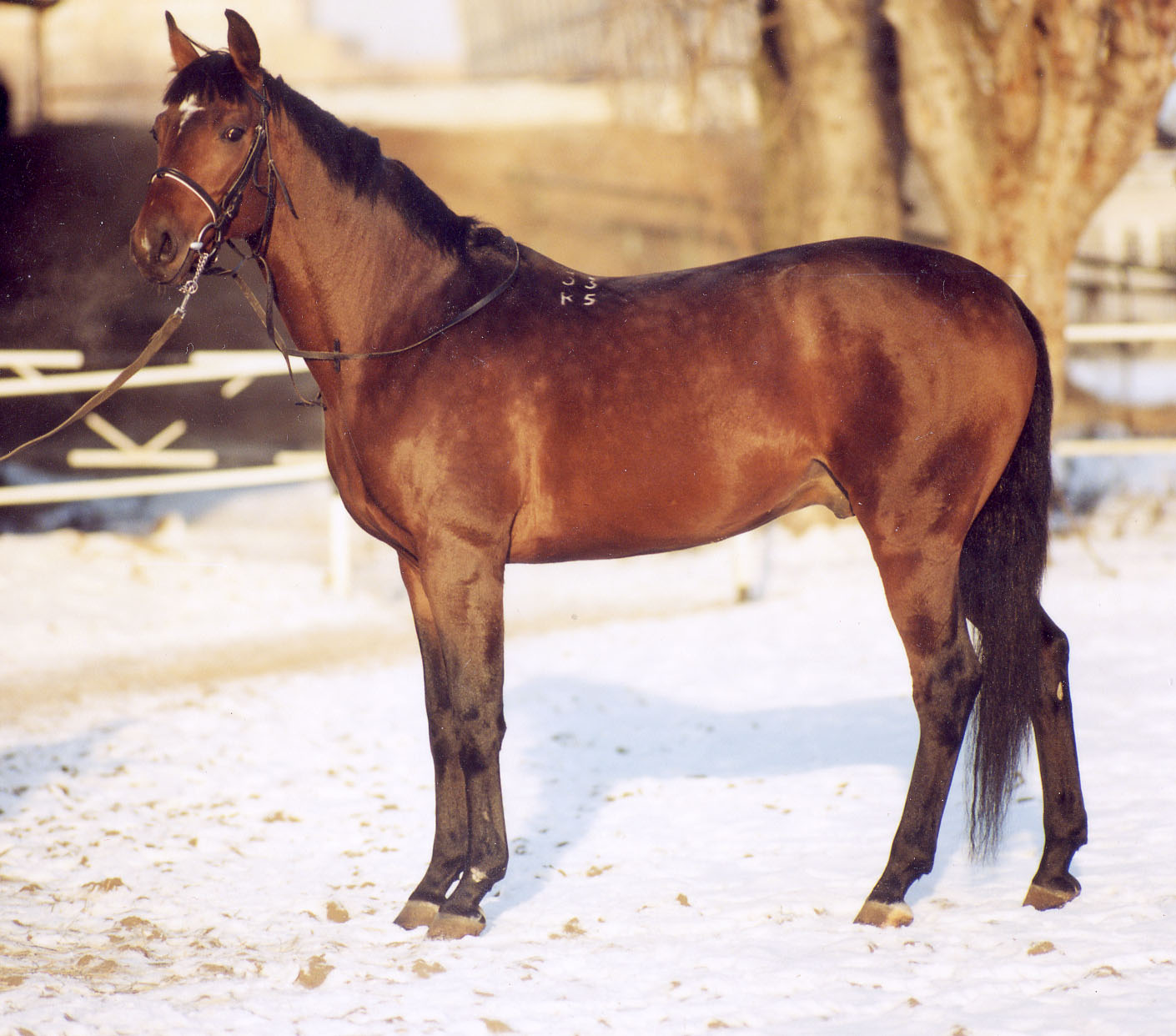
Rich red tones, top-down sootiness with dappling, and relatively restricted black points identify this dark bay.

Both Dark Bay horses, which have a black mane, tail, and legs with a dark reddish brown or sooty coat, and seal brown horses, which have very dark brown coats in addition to black "points", with reddish or tan hairs around their muzzle, eyes, elbows, and flanks have one of two genotypes at the Agouti locus: A/A or A/a. Both coat colors exhibit a broad range of potential shades due to a variety of factors including the bleaching or fading of black hair, nutrition, and the presence of sooty or countershading factors.

Many black horses fade, sunbleach, or otherwise undergo a lightening of their coat color with exposure to sunlight and sweat. These horses are often mistaken for seal browns or dark bays. Horses which do not undergo such fading are now usually called “non-fading” black, though other terms were used in the past. However, though hypothesized, there does not appear to be a separate “non-fading” allele for black, either. Mineral and vitamin deficiencies can also contribute to a lighter coat, similar to sunbleaching.

Black-pointed horses that are not uniformly black often exhibit a trait called sootiness. A sooty coat exhibits a mixing of black or darker hairs more concentrated on the dorsal aspect (top) of the animal, and less prevalent on the underparts. Sootiness is thought to be a form of countershading. Horses without any sootiness are termed "clear-coated". Sootiness can be minor or quite extensive, and often includes dappling. Dark bay horses are typically sooty. The difference between the top-down distribution of the sooty trait and the lighter soft areas of a seal brown can also be difficult to distinguish from one another.

The team of French researchers who developed the DNA test for the recessive a allele also discussed the possibility that Extension might be dosage-dependent. They found a statistically significant tendency for lighter bays to be heterozygous for the dominant, wildtype Extension allele (E/e, also written E^{+}/E^{e}) while darker bays were more often homozygous (E/E). The authors acknowledged that other factors could play a role, and that the claim needed to be studied on a greater scale. This type of dosage-dependent behavior was not observed with Agouti.
