= Bay (horse) =

Hair coat color of horses

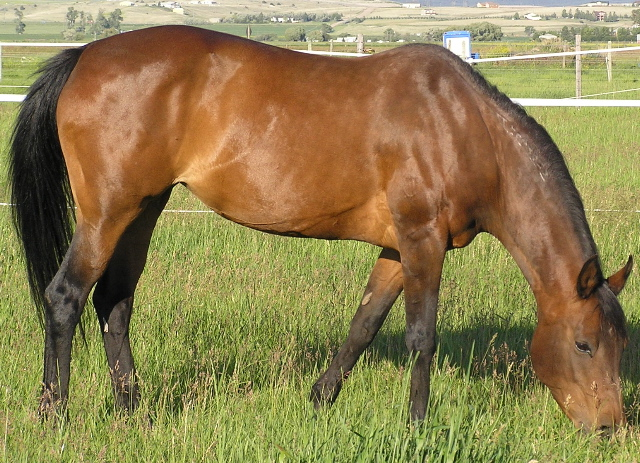
- A bay mare
- Variants: Bright reddish-brown to dark shades probably influenced by sooty or seal brown, points may be restricted in "wild bay" pattern

Genotype
- Base color: Black (E)
- Modifying genes: agouti gene (A)
- Description: reddish-brown body coat with black point coloration

Phenotype
- Body: Reddish-Brown
- Head and Legs: Black
- Mane and tail: Black
- Skin: Black
- Eyes: Brown, unless modified by another gene
- Other notes: Black ear edges

Bay is a hair coat color of horses, characterized by a reddish-brown or brown body color with a black point coloration on the mane, tail, ear edges, and lower legs. Bay is one of the most common coat colors in many horse breeds.

The black areas of a bay horse's hair coat are called "black points", and without them, a horse is not a bay horse. Black points may sometimes be covered by white markings; however such markings do not alter a horse's classification as "bay". Bay horses have dark skin – except under white markings, where the skin is pink. Genetically, bay occurs when a horse carries both the Agouti gene modifying the extension gene that creates black base coat. While the basic genetics that create bay coloring are fairly simple, the genes themselves and the mechanisms that cause shade variations within the bay family are quite complex and, at times, disputed. The genetics of dark shades of bay are still under study. The genetic mechanism that produces seal brown has yet to be isolated. Sooty genetics also appear to darken some horses' bay coats, and that genetic mechanism is yet to be fully understood.

The addition of dilution genes or various spotting pattern genes create many additional coat colors, although the underlying bay coat color genetics usually manifest by a warm-toned red, tan, or brownish body color and the appearance of black points.

== Color variations and terminology ==
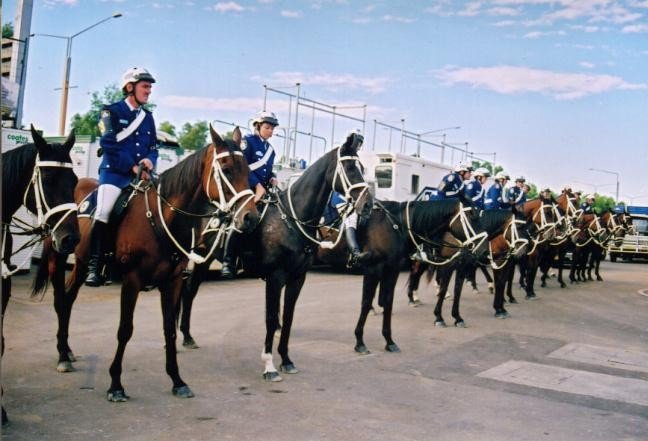
The horses of the New South Wales Mounted Police show some of the typical variations in the bay color.

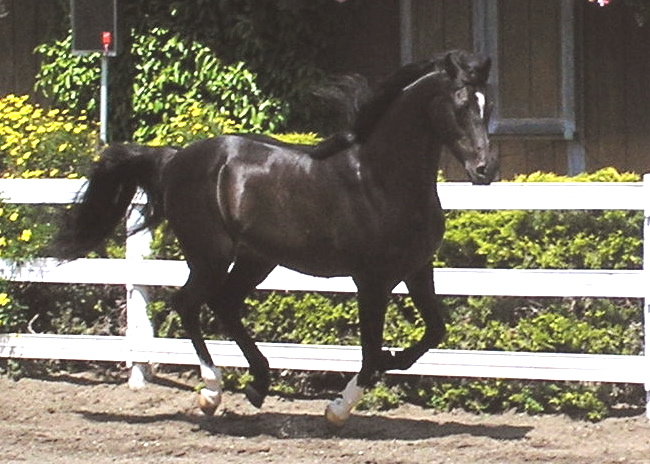
A very dark bay horse might appear to be almost black

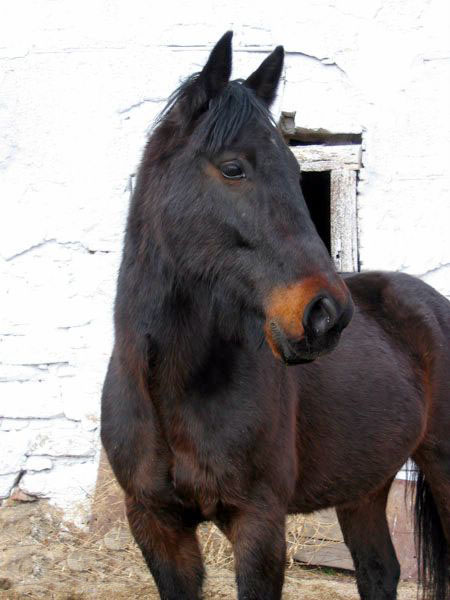
Dark bay or "brown" horses often have lighter hair around the muzzle, eyes, flanks, and elbow

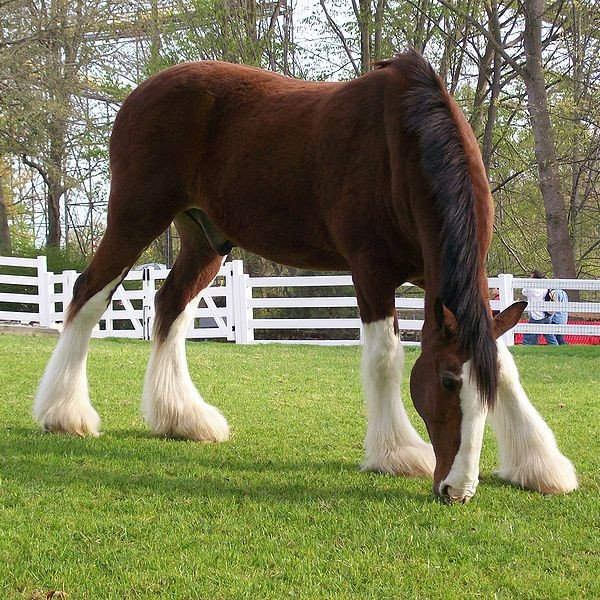
This horse is bay despite the fact that its black legs are masked by white markings

Bay horses range in color from a light copper red, to a rich red blood bay (the best-known variety of bay horse) to a very dark red or brown called dark bay, mahogany bay, black-bay, or brown (or "seal brown"). The dark brown shades of bay are referred to in other languages by words meaning "black-and-tan." Dark bays/browns may be so dark as to have nearly black coats, with brownish-red hairs visible only under the eyes, around the muzzle, behind the elbow, and in front of the stifle. Dark bay should not be confused with "Liver" chestnut, which is also a very dark brown color, but a liver chestnut has a brown mane, tail and legs, and no black points.

Bay horses have black skin and dark eyes, except for the skin under markings, which is pink. Skin color can help an observer distinguish between a bay horse with white markings and a horse which resembles bay but is not.

The pigment in a bay horse's coat, regardless of shade, is rich and fully saturated. This makes bays particularly lustrous in the sun if properly cared for. Some bay horses exhibit dappling, which is caused by textured, concentric rings within the coat. Dapples on a bay horse suggest good condition and care, though many well-cared for horses never dapple. The tendency to dapple may also be, to some extent, genetic.

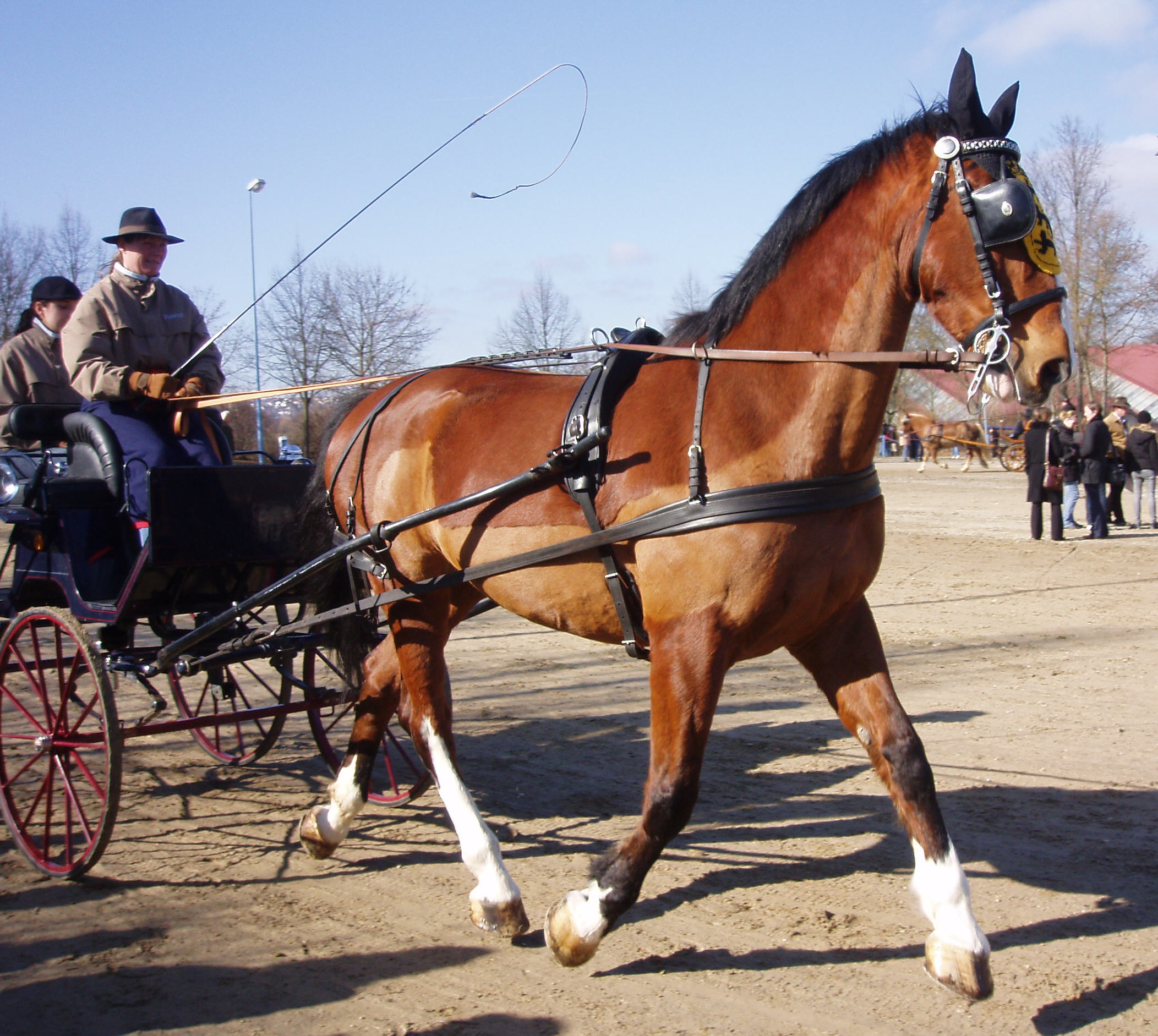
A partially body-clipped horse, showing the two-toned red hair shaft.

The red areas of a bay coat usually have a two-toned hair shaft, which, if shaved closely (such as when body-clipping for a horse show), may cause the horse to appear several shades lighter, a somewhat dull orange-gold, almost like a dun. However, as the hair grows out, it will darken again to the proper shade. This phenomenon is linked to the genetics that produce red coloration in horses, but usually not seen in body-clipped darker shades of bay because there is less red in the hair shaft.

There are many terms that are used to describe particular shades and qualities of a bay coat. Some shade variations can be related to nutrition and grooming, but most appear to be caused by inherited factors not yet fully understood.

The shades with the least point coloration are called wild bays. Wild bays are true bays with fully pigmented reddish coat color and black manes and tails, but the black points only extend up to the pastern or fetlock. Wild bay is sometimes found in conjunction with a trait called "pangare" that produces pale color on the underbelly and soft areas, such as near the stifle and around the muzzle.

Some breed registries use the term "brown" to describe darker bays, though modern genetics have resulted in some terminology revisions such as the use of "bay or brown." However, "liver" chestnuts, horses with a red or brown mane and tail as well as a dark brownish body coat, are sometimes called "brown" in some colloquial contexts. Therefore, "brown" can be an ambiguous term for describing horse coat color. It is clearer to refer to dark-colored horses as dark bays or liver chestnuts.

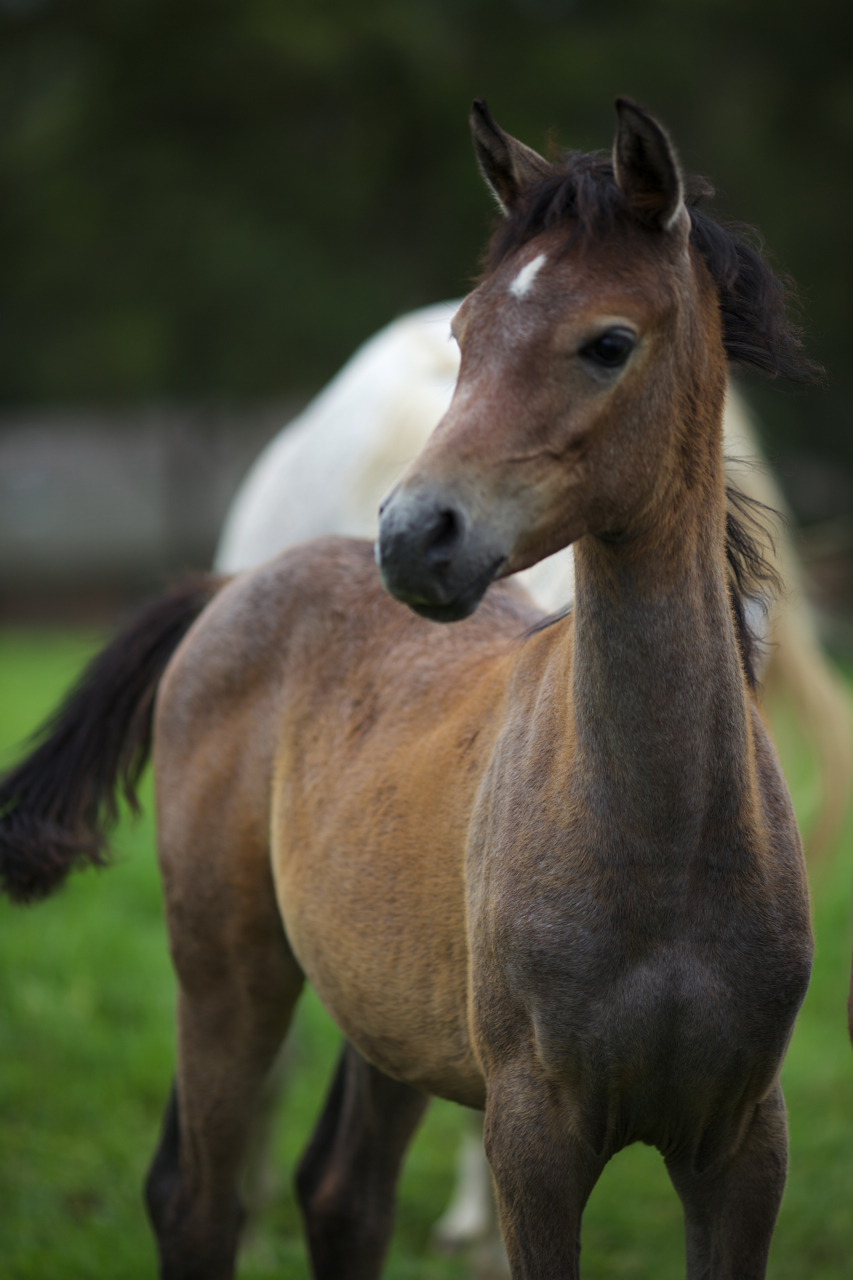
This foal was born bay but is starting to turn gray

To further complicate matters, there apparently exists more than one genetic mechanism that darkens coat colors. One is a theorized sooty gene which produces dark shading on any coat color. The other is a specific allele of Agouti linked to a certain type of dark bay, called seal brown. The seal brown horse has dark brown body and lighter areas around the eyes, the muzzle, and flanks. A DNA test said to detect the seal brown (A^{t}) allele was developed, but the test was never subjected to peer review and due to unreliable results was subsequently pulled from the market.

=== Effect of gray gene ===
Some foals are born bay, but carry the dominant gene for graying, and thus will turn gray as they mature until eventually their hair coat is completely white. Foals that are going to become gray must have one parent that is gray. Some foals may be born with a few white hairs already visible around the eyes, muzzle, and other fine-haired, thin-skinned areas, but others may not show signs of graying until they are several months old.

== Colors confused with bay ==
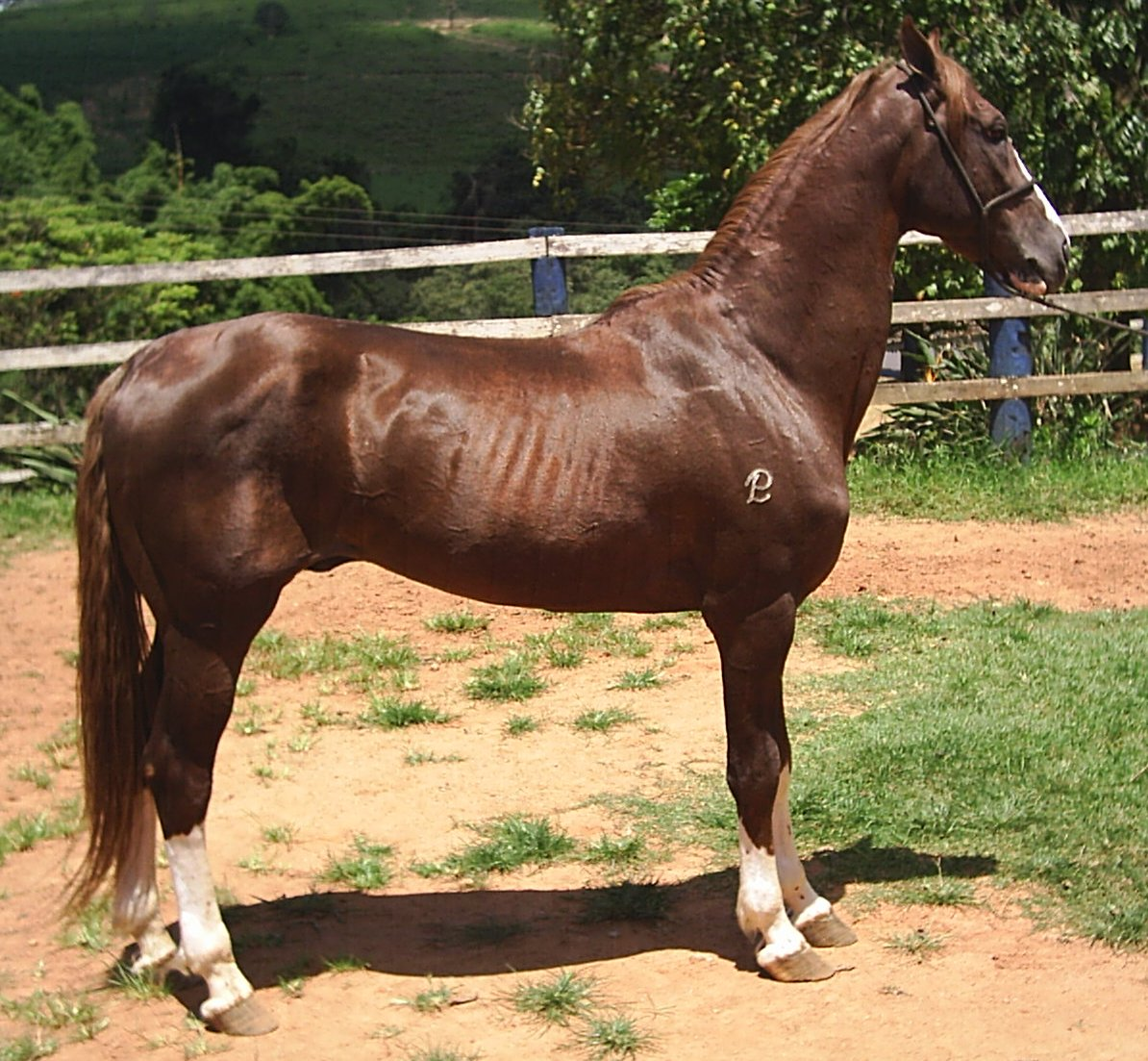
A liver chestnut is distinguished from a bay by a lack of black points. The mane and tail are the same color as the body, or lighter.

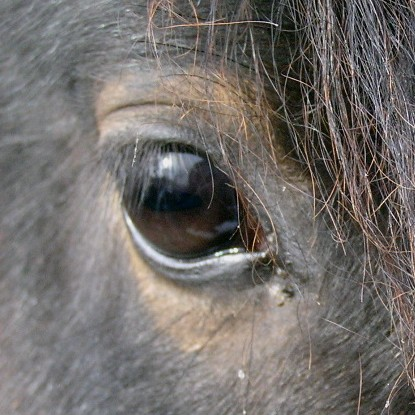
Dark bay horse, showing lighter hairs around the eye

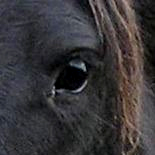
Black horse with sun-bleached forelock, showing solid black hairs around the eye, even though forelock is reddish

- Chestnuts, sometimes called "Sorrels," have a reddish body coat similar to a bay, but no black points. Their legs and ear edges are the same color as the rest of their body (unless they have white markings) and their manes and tails are the same shade as their body color or even a few shades lighter.
- Black is occasionally confused with dark bays and liver chestnuts because some black horses "sunburn," that is, when kept out in the sun, they develop a bleached-out coat that looks brownish, particularly in the fine-haired areas around the flanks. However, a true black can be recognized by looking at the fine hairs around the muzzle and eyes. These hairs are always black on a black horse, but are reddish, brownish, or even a light gold on a bay or chestnut.

== Genetics ==
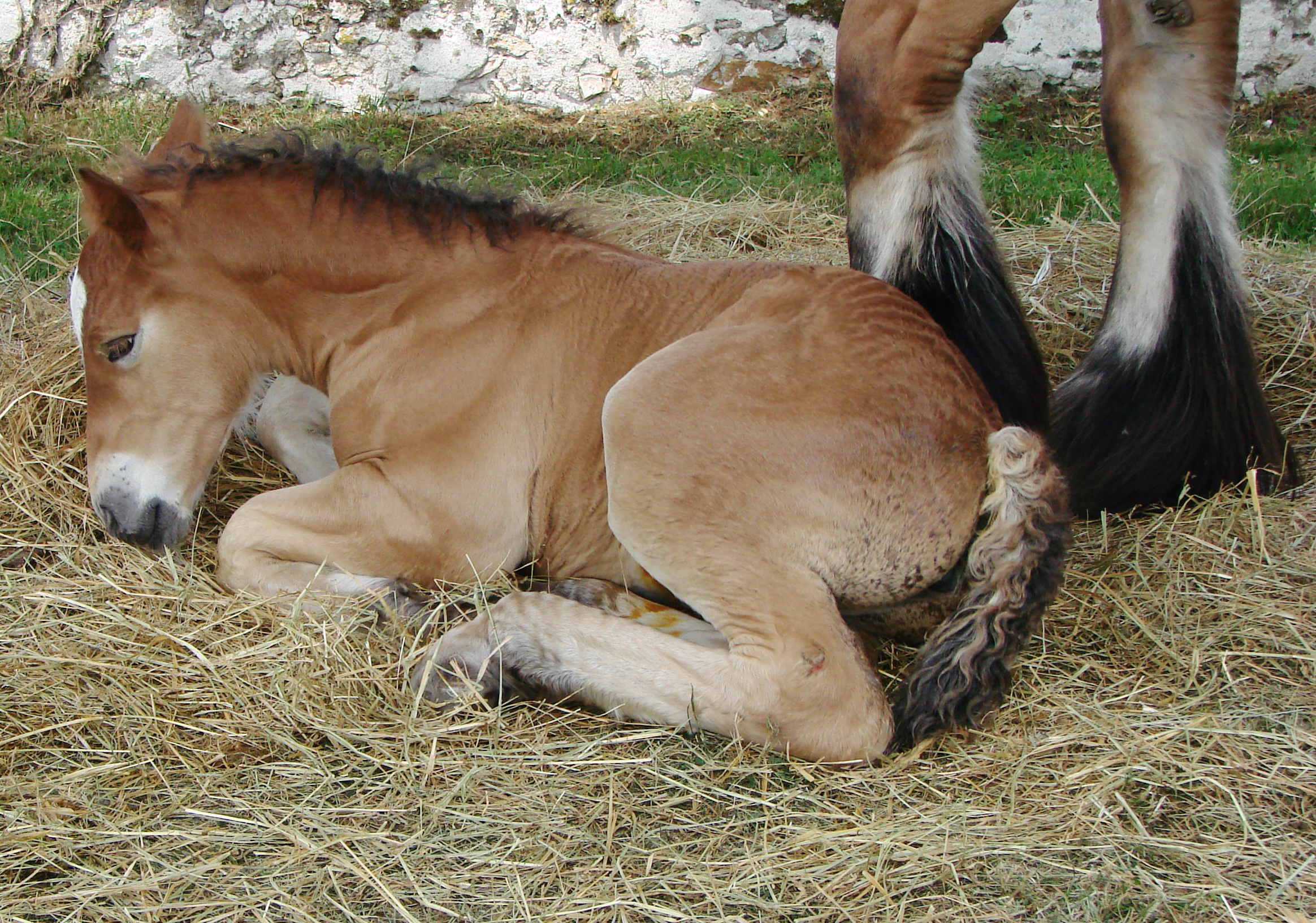
Bay foals, like this one, sometimes have pale hairs on their legs and in their mane and tail until they shed their foal coats

The bay color is created with two colors of melanin pigment, the black eumelanin, which gives the black color of the mane, tail, and lower legs, and the "red" pheomelanin, which gives the body its red-brown color. Unlike the point coloration of Siamese cats and Himalayan rabbits, the points on horses are not produced by an albinism gene. Instead, two genes called extension and agouti interact to create this pattern.

At agouti, the dominant, ancestral A allele limits the location of black pigment to the points, seen in the bay color. The recessive a allele allows black pigment to cover the whole body, resulting in a fully black horse.

At extension, horses with the dominant, ancestral E allele are able to produce either red or black pigment, and depending on agouti genotype horses with E can be bay or black. The recessive e alleles replaces all black pigment in the coat with red, creating a solid red chestnut coat regardless of agouti genotype. To be bay, a horse must have at least one E at extension and at least one A at agouti.

The extent to which a bay passes on its color varies. Two bay horses heterozygous for E (Ee x Ee) have a 25% statistical probability to produce a chestnut. Similarly, bay horses heterozygous for A (Aa x Aa) may produce a black foal.

Because chestnut's e at extension is recessive to bay's E, two chestnut horses can never have a bay foal. Likewise, because black's a at agouti is recessive, two black horses cannot have a bay foal either. However, it is possible for a chestnut horse and a black horse to produce a bay foal, if the chestnut horse is AA or Aa at agouti. The foal can inherit the A allele from its chestnut parent and the E allele from its black parent, resulting in a bay color.

The genetics behind the different shades of bay are still under investigation. A genome wide association study identified a region of equine chromosome 22 that appears to correlate with the extent of black pigment on bay horses. This region includes the 5' end of the agouti gene as well as another gene called RALY, both known to affect coat color in other species. Further research is needed to pinpoint the causative mutation.

=== Origin ===
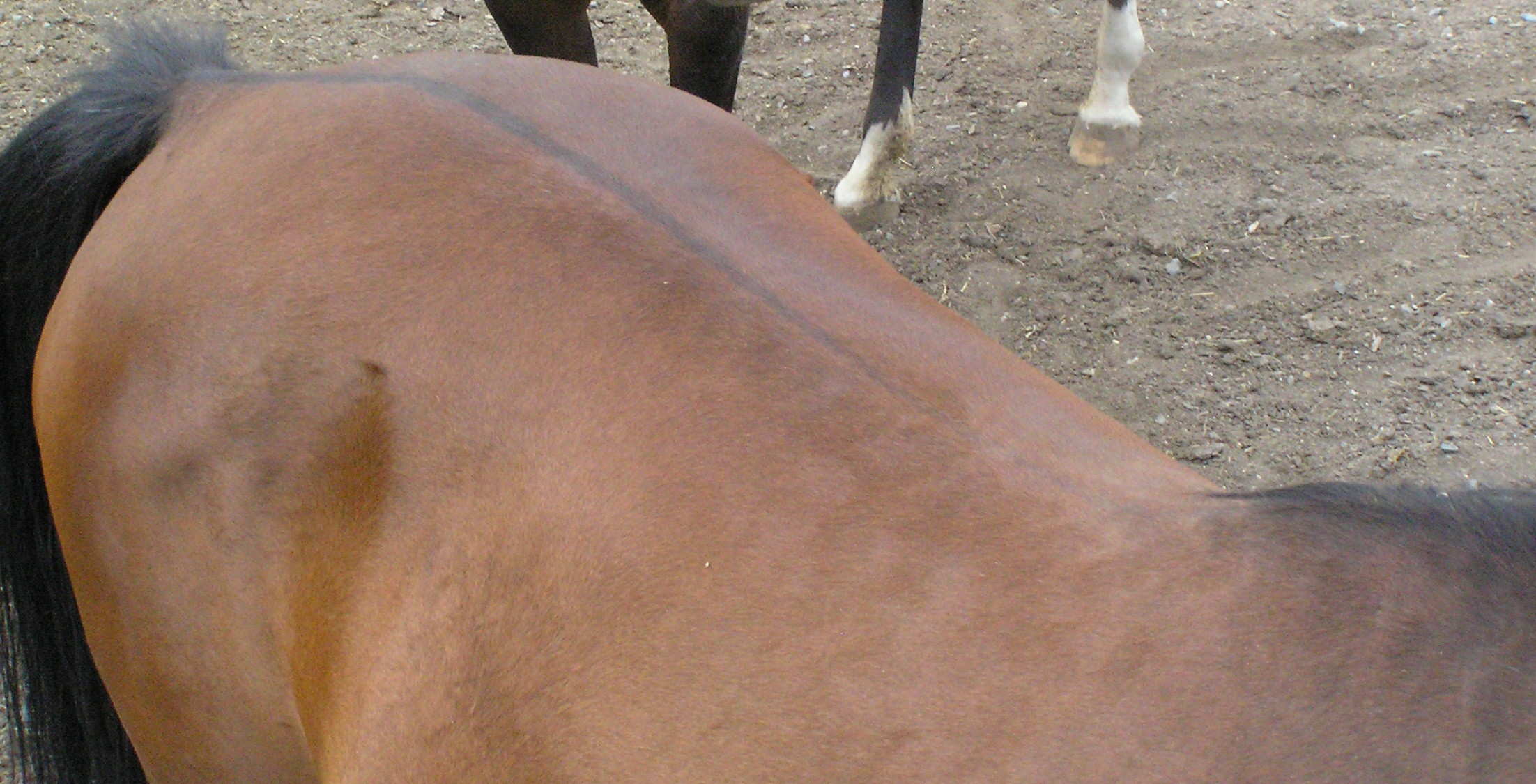
Some bay horses have a faint dorsal stripe, which may be caused by the non-dun 1 allele.

The oldest known horse coat color is bay dun, a tan color with a black mane, tail, dorsal stripe, and lower legs. The legs may sometimes have zebra-like black stripes; these, along with the dorsal stripe seen on all dun horses, are called primitive markings. Over 42,000 years ago, a mutation called non-dun 1 appeared, which allowed horses to be bay. Non-dun 1 replaces the tan dun color with the darker brown of bay, but keeps the primitive markings seen on dun. Later a second mutation to the dun gene, called non-dun 2, was able to remove the primitive markings altogether to create the non-striped bay color common today.

== Bay-family colors ==
The effects of additional equine coat color genes on a bay template alter the basic color into other shades or patterns:

- Buckskin horses have a black mane and tail, but instead of a red or brown coat, they have a cream or gold coat. Though once called a "Sandy" bay in older texts on horse color, the genetic distinction created by the cream gene is significant. They are a bay horse that is also heterozygous for the dominant creme (CCr) allele. The black pigment remains largely unchanged, but any red pigment in the coat is diluted to gold. Buckskins are seldom mistaken for bays because their coats are significantly lighter and have no hint of a red or orange tint.
- Perlinos are bay horses who are homozygous for the dominant creme (CCr) allele. Both black and red pigment are diluted to some shade of creme, though the formerly black points often have a stronger reddish cast. The skin is a slightly pigmented pink and the eyes are blue.
- Bay duns are bay horses with at least one dominant dun allele. Red and black pigment at the extremities remains largely unchanged, but on the body, black pigment is diluted to slate and red pigment is diluted to a dustier shade. The effect is similar to buckskin, but the coat of a bay dun is a flatter tan rather than bronze, and all duns have some form of primitive markings that include a dorsal stripe along the backbone, and sometimes faint horizontal striping at the back of the front legs.
- Amber champagne refers to a bay horse with at least one dominant champagne allele. Black pigment is diluted to warm brown and red pigment to gold. The effect is similar to buckskin, but the points of an amber champagne do not remain black, and the skin is mottled. Amber champagnes also have hazel eyes rather than brown.
- Silver bays are bay horses with at least one dominant silver (Z) allele. Red pigment is unaffected, but black pigment in the short coat is diluted to dark, flat, brown-gray while the longer hairs are diluted to silver. The overall effect on a bay is that of a chocolate-colored horse with a pale mane and tail.
- Bay Roan horses are bays with at least one dominant roan (Rn) allele. The roan gene creates an effect of white hairs intermingled with the red body coat. This color was formerly lumped together with chestnut or "strawberry" roans and called "red roan."
- Bay pintos are bay horses with any number of white spotting genes, including but not limited to tobiano, frame overo or splashed white, and so on. The pattern has no bearing on whether or not the horse is bay. Pinto horses also may have a bay base coat overlaid by white spots. Sometimes the term "skewbald" or "tricolor" is used, especially in the UK, to refer to bay pintos.
  - Sabino is a color pattern in the pinto family, but in some cases, the gene may be minimally expressed in the form of very bold white markings or slight body spotting and such horses will be registered by their owners as "bay," particularly in breed registries that do not have a category for pinto.
- Bay Leopards are horses that carry the leopard (Lp) gene or gene complex characteristic of the Appaloosa and other breeds. This gene also produces secondary characteristics that include mottled skin, a white sclera around the eye, and striped hooves.
- A few bay horses may carry the rabicano gene, which either produces faint roaning on only some parts of the body or can cause some white or cream hairs to appear in the mane or tail, sometimes creating a "skunk" effect. Most bays with rabicano are registered as either bays or as bay roans.

== See also ==
- Equine coat color genetics
- Equine coat color
