= Agouti (coloration) =

Animal fur with multiple color bands on each hair

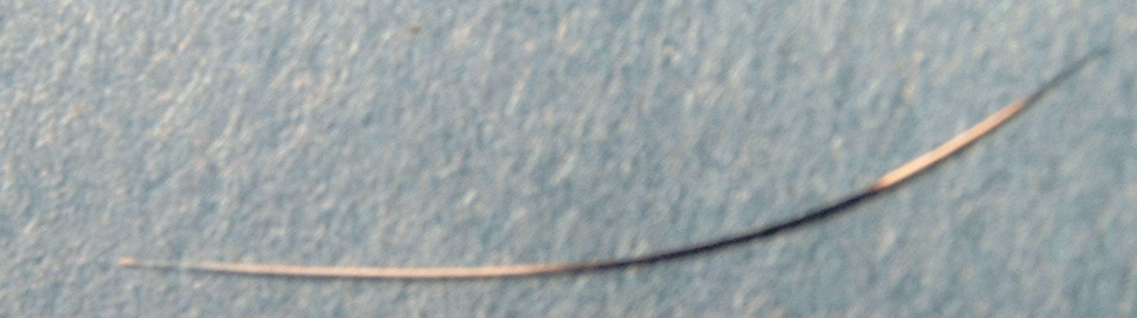
A cat hair showing agouti coloration

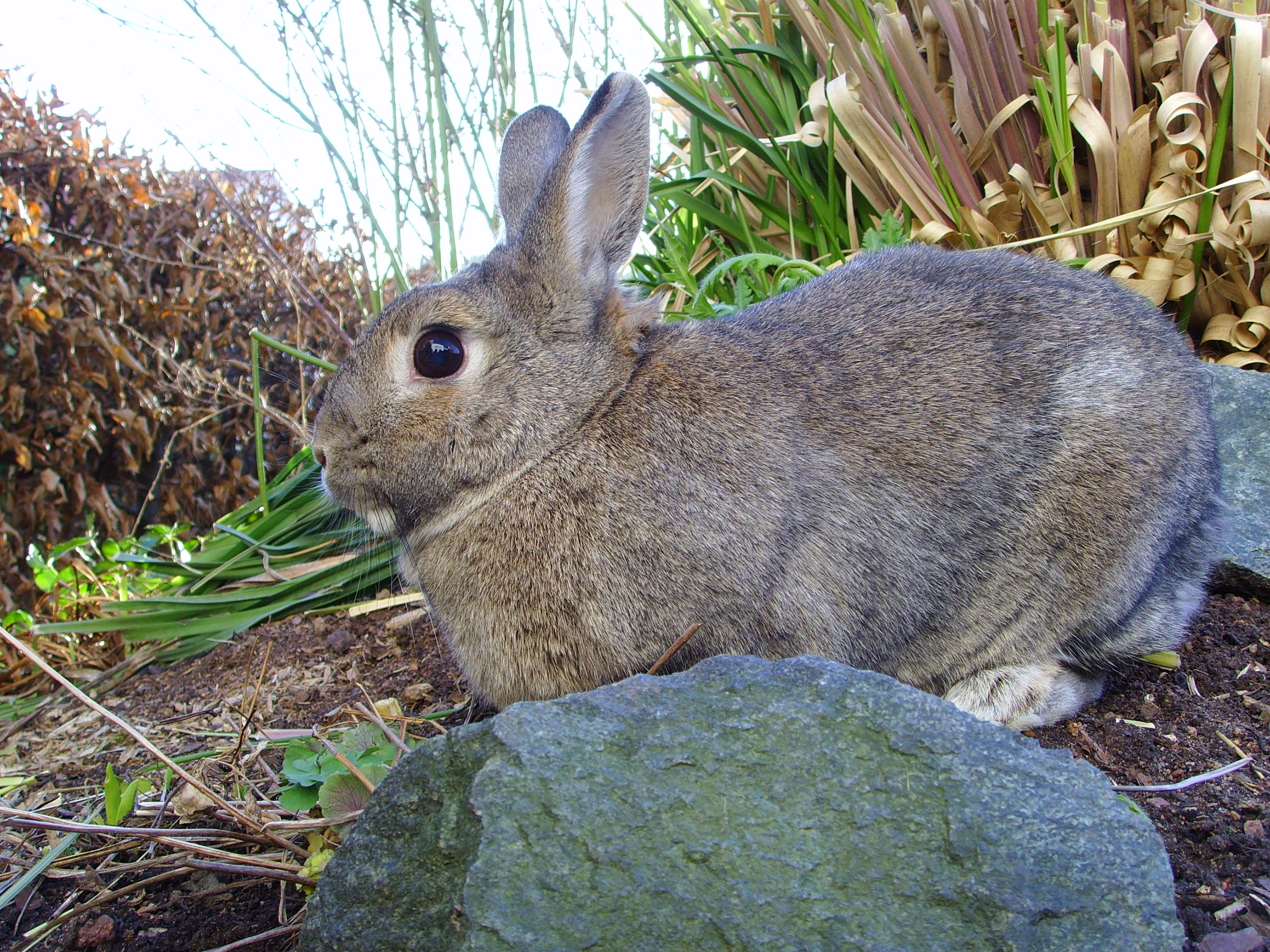
A domestic rabbit with agouti coloration

Agouti is a type of fur coloration in which each hair displays two or more bands of pigmentation. The overall appearance of agouti fur is usually gray or dull brown, although dull yellow is also possible.

Agouti fur is characterized by an appearance of being composed of hairs of different colors, separate from definite markings (although agouti can appear in combination with other markings, such as spots, stripes or patches). This effect is caused by different portions of each hair being visible, such that different colors of the hair's banding are seen, despite hairs actually having similar coloration. This effect produces a very distinctive, finely "speckled" appearance similar to "salt and pepper" hair, as well as an iridescent effect very similar to shot silk, which causes the overall color to appear to shift subtly depending on the angle of the light or when the animal moves.

Agouti fur is the wild type pigmentation for many domesticated mammals. It is a highly recognized characteristic trait of several animals, including many wild canids, wild felids, wild rabbits, and wild rodents, such as the namesake agouti.

== Canines ==
In dogs, there are four alleles on the agouti locus with the hierarchy of dominance (epistasis): Ay, aw, at, and a.

This means a descendant can develop a recessive coat pattern in the phenotype only if both parents are genetic carriers of the corresponding allele or if one parent inherits an epistatically underlying allele to the offspring. The alleles Ay, at and an are not present in wild wolves that have no domestic dog among their ancestors.

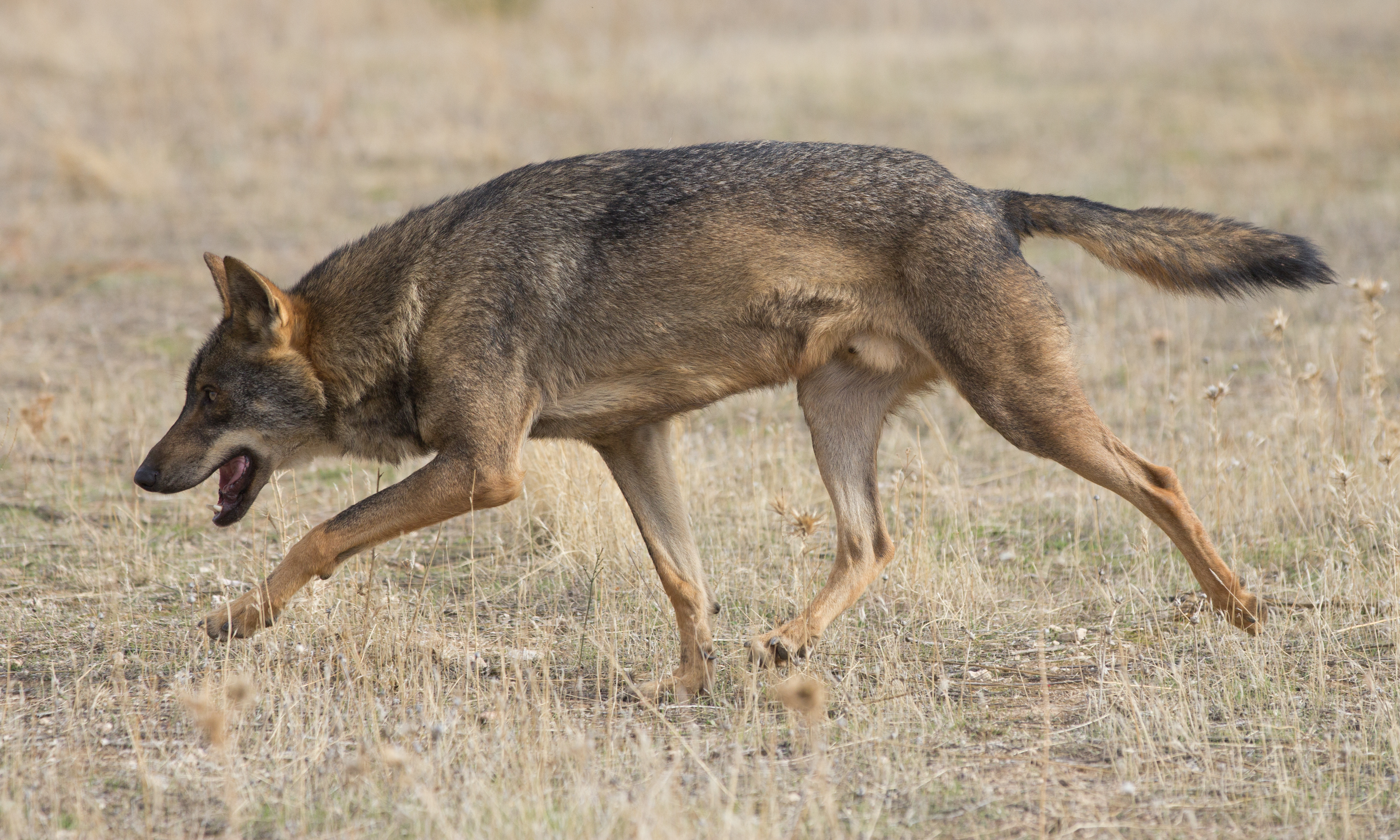
An Iberian wolf with agouti coloration

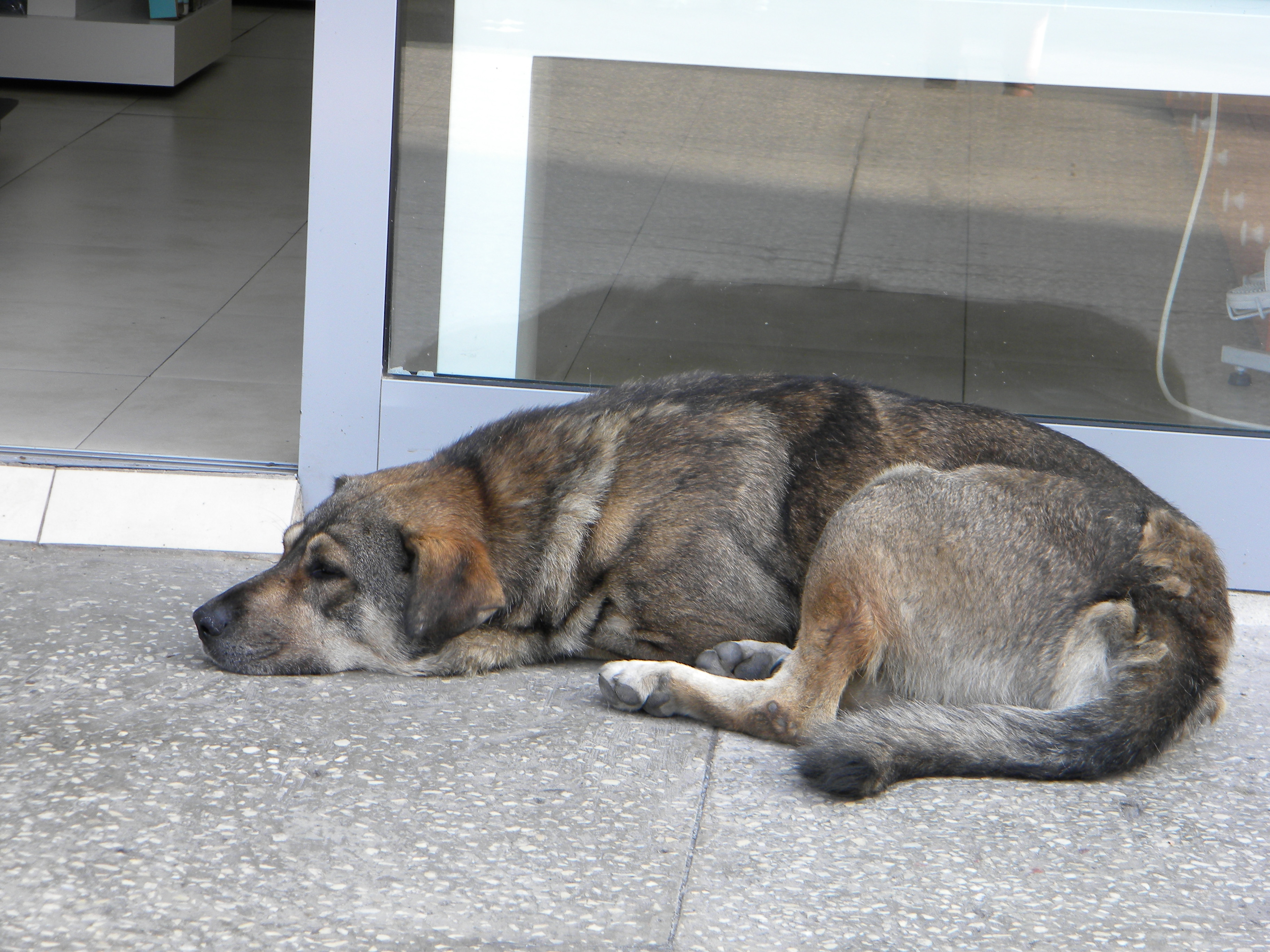
An agouti dog

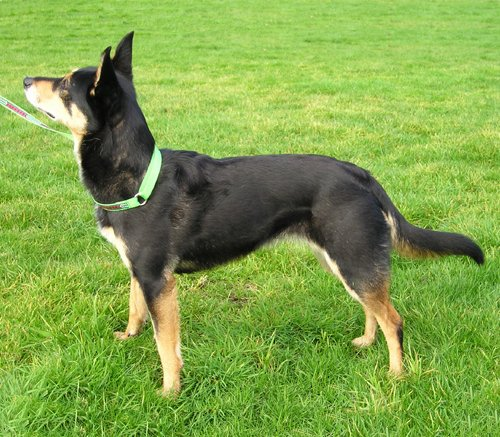
Australian Kelpie, genotype at
black and tan

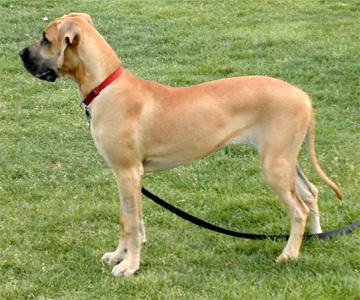
Great Dane, genotype Ay, either homozygous or in combination with one of the other alleles

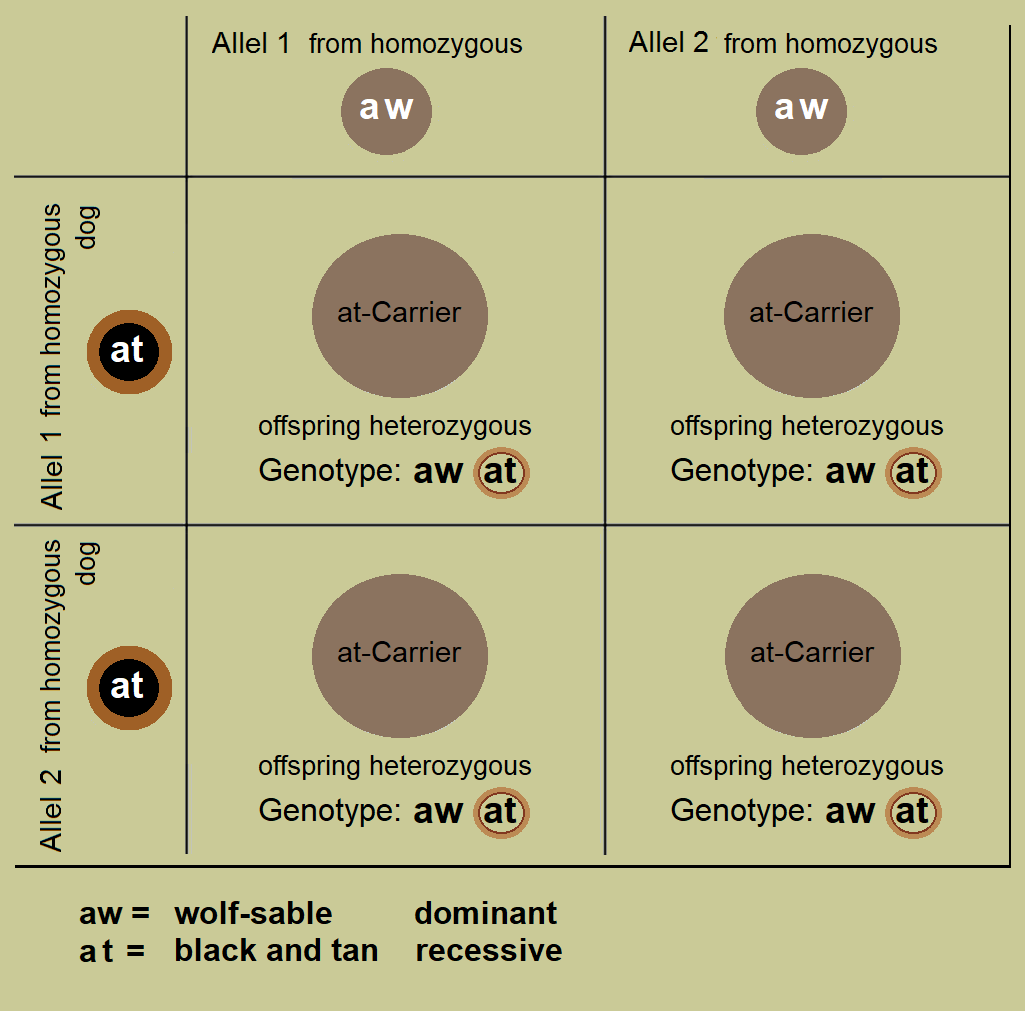
Cross of two different homozygous individuals

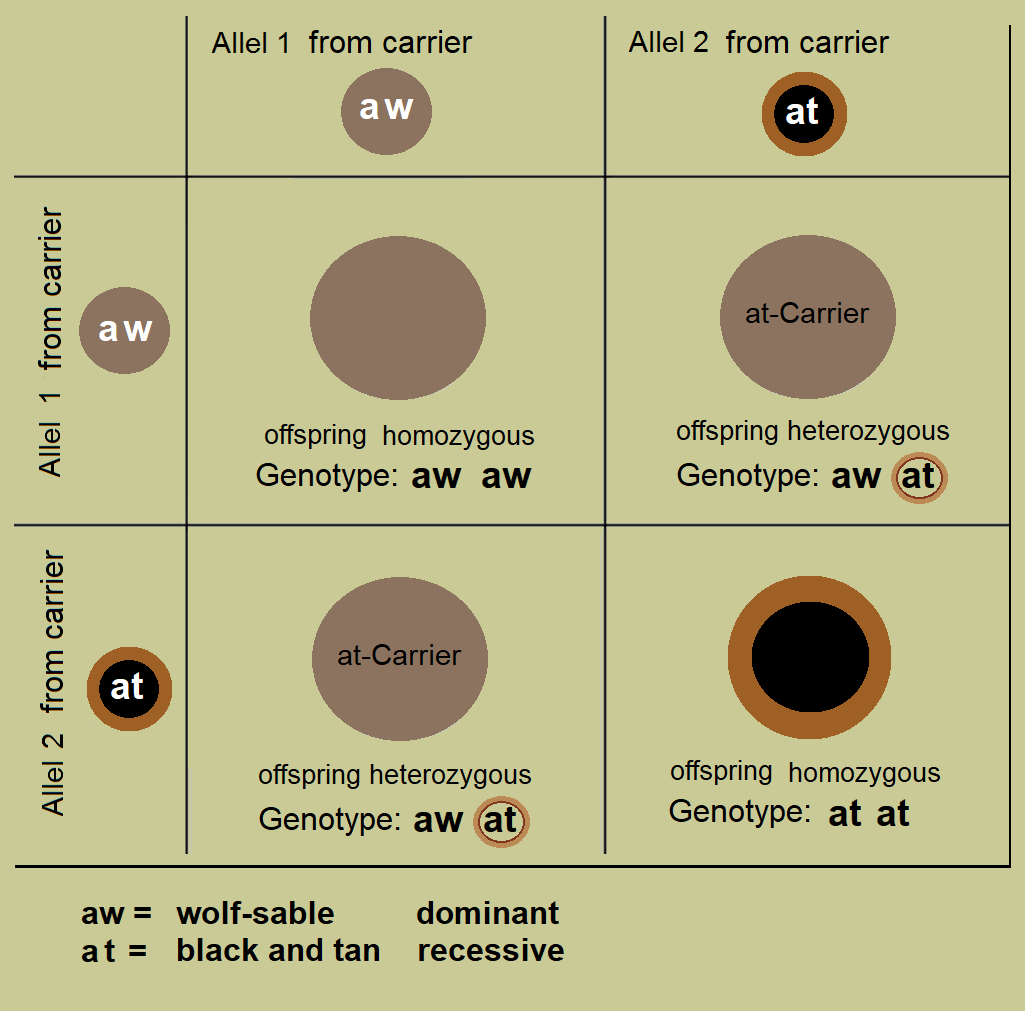
Cross of two
genetic carriers

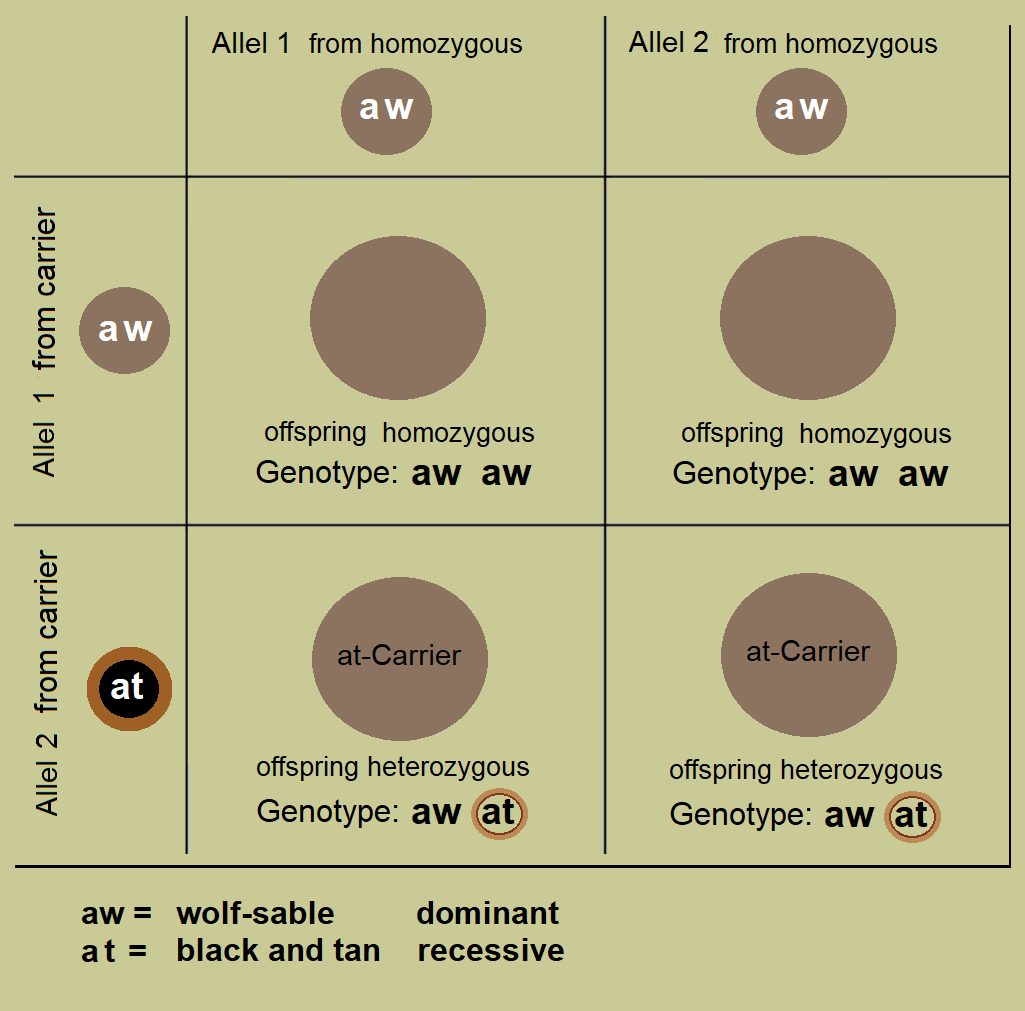
Cross of a homozygous individual with a carrier

== House mice (Mus musculus) ==
In fancy mice, there are eight common alleles on the agouti locus with the hierarchy of: A^{y}, A^{vy}, A^{hvy}, A^{w}, A, a^{t}, a, and a^{e}.

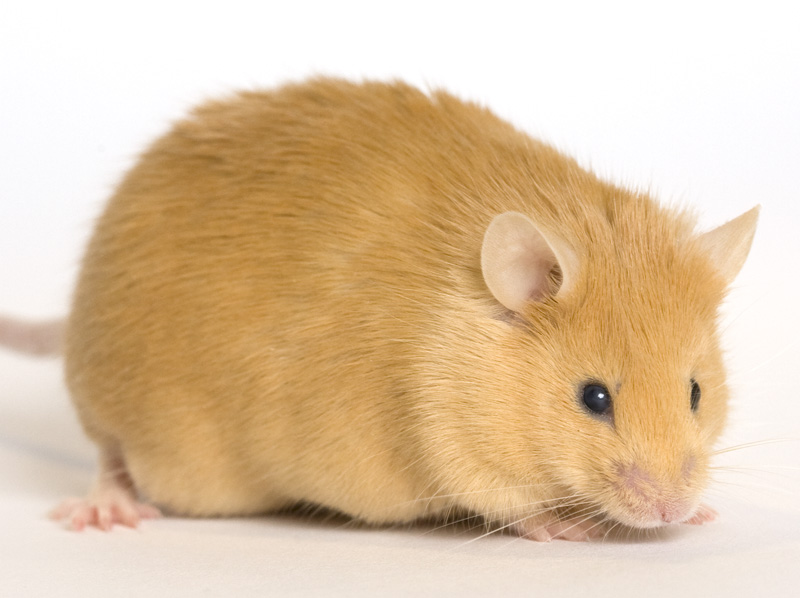
A lethal yellow lab mouse with the genotype A^{y}/a.

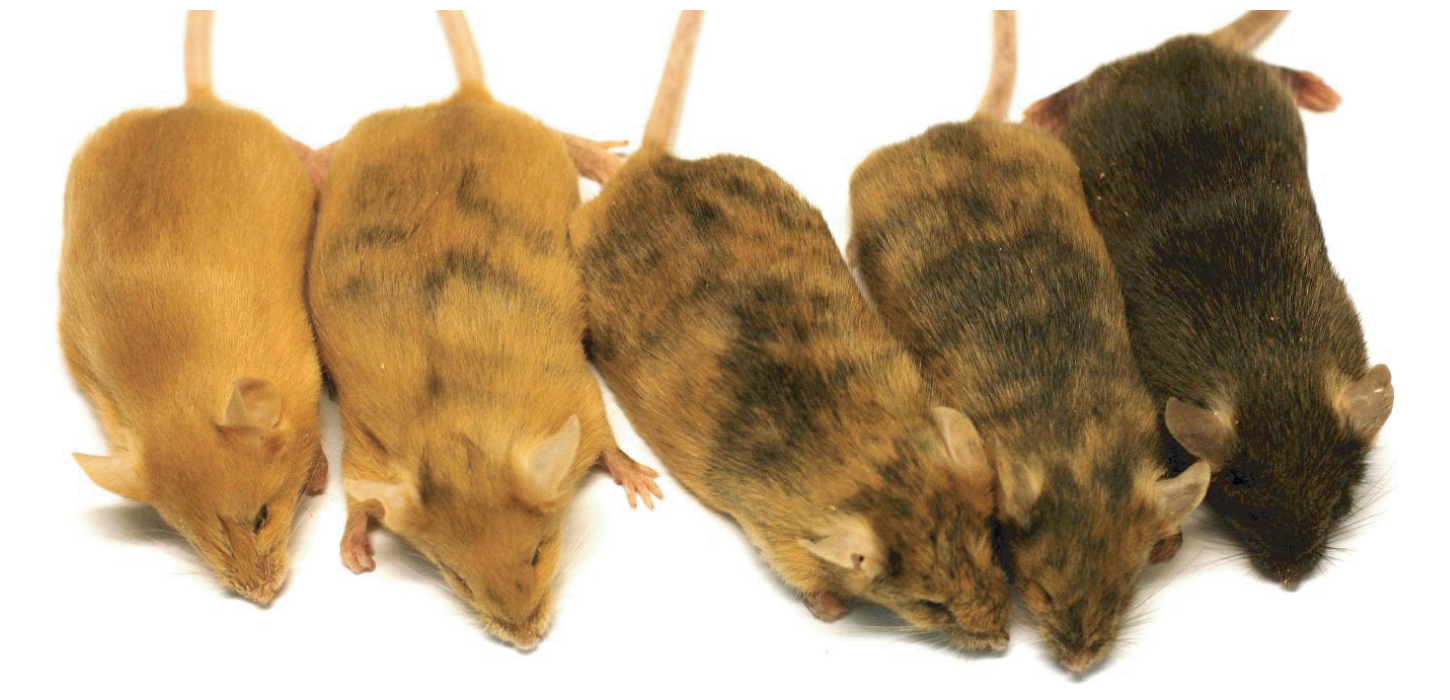
Five viable yellow brindle mice with the genotype A^{vy}/*. They range from solid yellow to pseudoagouti.

== Horses (Equus ferus caballus) ==
In horses, there are two common alleles on the agouti locus, with the hierarchy of dominance: AA, Aa, and aa. If the horse has black pigment (EE or Ee), agouti (AA or A) results in black hairs only being shown in the mane, tail, and legs. This is known as bay coat color. With no agouti acting upon the base color black, the horse will stay black. Agouti will have no effect on horses with no black pigment (ee), which have a chestnut coat color. This is presuming no other alleles, such as dun, have any influence. If they do, more coat color variations are possible.

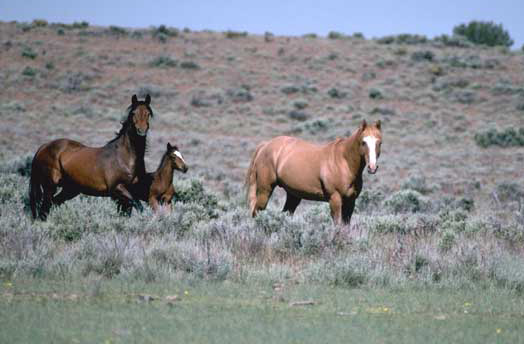
Bay (left) and chestnut (right) horses

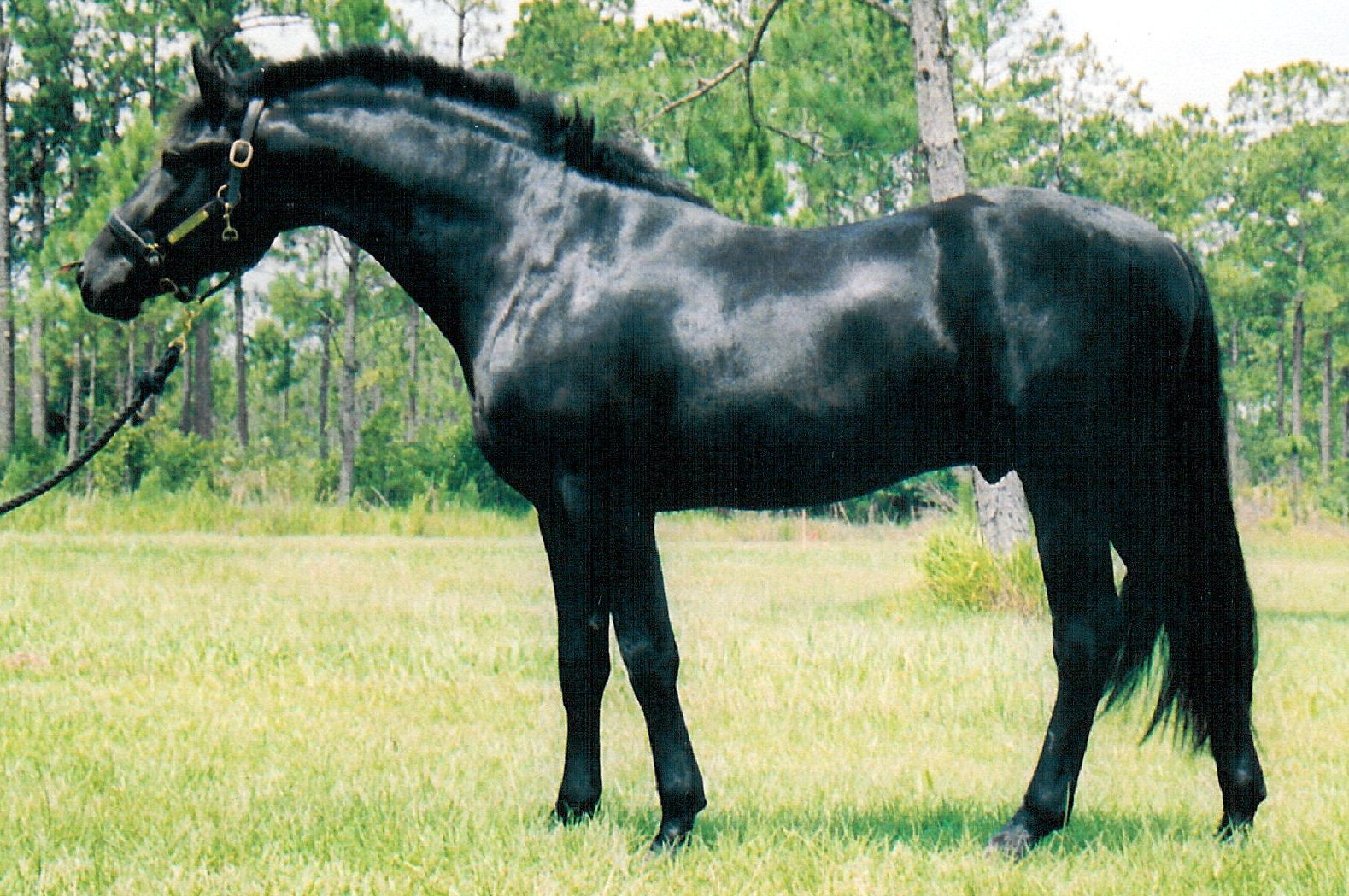
Black horse

== See also ==
- Agouti, an animal of order Rodentia it was named after
- Agouti-signaling protein, the protein encoded by the agouti (ASIP) gene
- Agouti coloration genetics, an overview of different animal coat colors caused by differences in the agouti gene
