= RALY =

Protein-coding gene in the species Homo sapiens

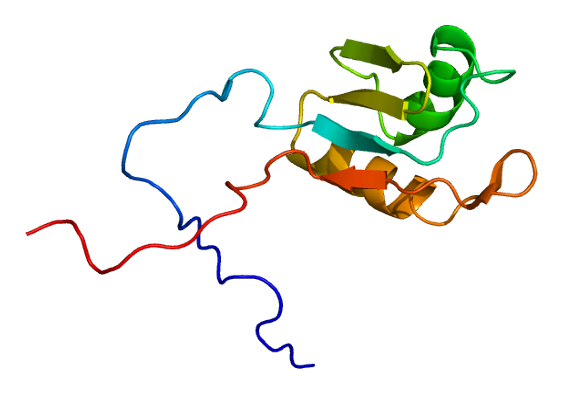

Identifiers
- Aliases: RALY, HNRPCL2, P542, RALY heterogeneous nuclear ribonucleoprotein
- External IDs: OMIM: 614663; MGI: 97850; GeneCards: RALY
Available structures
PDB	Ortholog search: PDBe RCSB
PDB	List of PDB id codes 1WF1

Gene location (Human)
Chr.	Chromosome 20 (human)
Band	20q11.22	Start	33,993,646 bp
Band	20q11.22	End	34,108,308 bp

Gene location (Mouse)
Chr.	Chromosome 2 (mouse)
Band	2 H1|2 76.83 cM	Start	154,633,016 bp
Band	2 H1|2 76.83 cM	End	154,709,181 bp
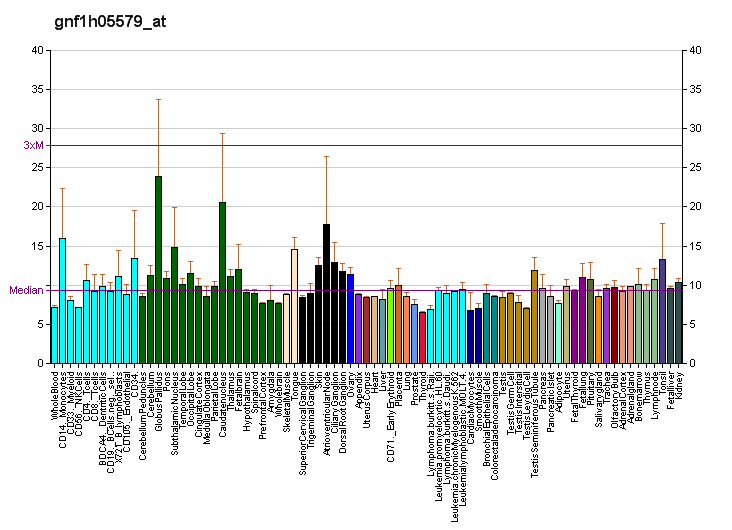

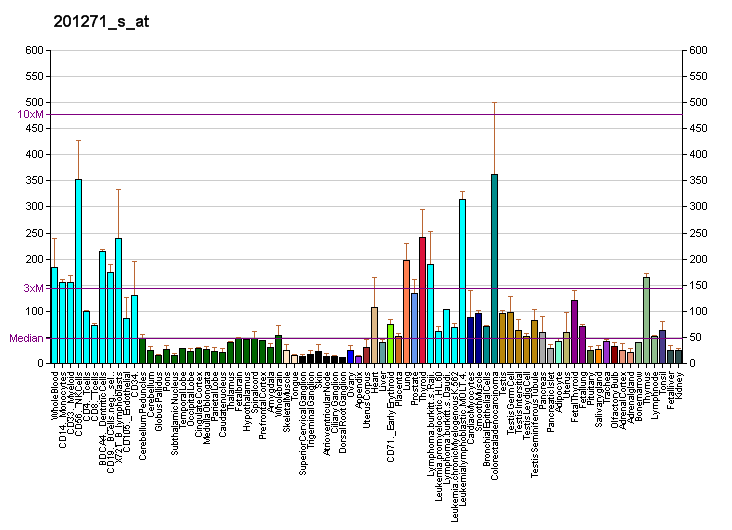
RNA expression pattern
Bgee	Human / Mouse (ortholog); Top expressed in: ganglionic eminence; granulocyte; ventricular zone; right lobe of thyroid gland; mucosa of transverse colon; left lobe of thyroid gland; left testis; right testis; ascending aorta; popliteal artery / Top expressed in: neural layer of retina; ventricular zone; yolk sac; granulocyte; lip; embryo; epiblast; tail of embryo; embryo; thymus; More reference expression data
BioGPS	More reference expression data
Gene ontology
Molecular function	protein binding; nucleic acid binding; transcription coregulator activity; RNA binding
Cellular component	catalytic step 2 spliceosome; spliceosomal complex; nucleus
Biological process	mRNA splicing, via spliceosome; mRNA processing; RNA splicing; regulation of transcription, DNA-templated; transcription, DNA-templated; regulation of nucleic acid-templated transcription; cholesterol homeostasis
Sources:Amigo / QuickGO
Orthologs
Databases	NCBI: entry; OMA: entry
Species	Human	Mouse
Entrez	22913	19383
Ensembl	ENSG00000125970	ENSMUSG00000027593
UniProt	Q9UKM9	Q64012
RefSeq (mRNA)	NM_007367; NM_016732	NM_001139511; NM_001139512; NM_001139513; NM_023130
RefSeq (protein)	NP_031393; NP_057951	NP_001132983; NP_001132984; NP_001132985; NP_075619
Location (UCSC)	Chr 20: 33.99 – 34.11 Mb	Chr 2: 154.63 – 154.71 Mb
PubMed search
- Wikidata
View/Edit Human	View/Edit Mouse

RNA-binding protein Raly is a protein that in humans is encoded by the RALY gene.

In infectious mononucleosis, anti-EBNA-1 antibodies are produced which cross-react with multiple normal human proteins. The cross-reactivity is due to anti-gly/ala antibodies that cross-react with host proteins containing configurations like those in the EBNA-1 repeat. One such antigen is RALY which is a member of the heterogeneous nuclear ribonucleoprotein gene family.
