= Pangaré =

Coat trait found in some horses

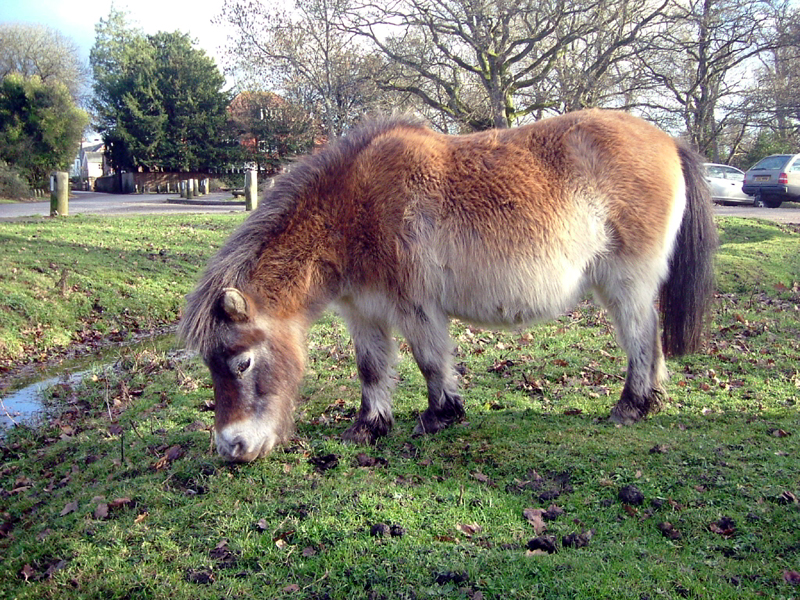
Pangare traits include light underparts and light muzzle

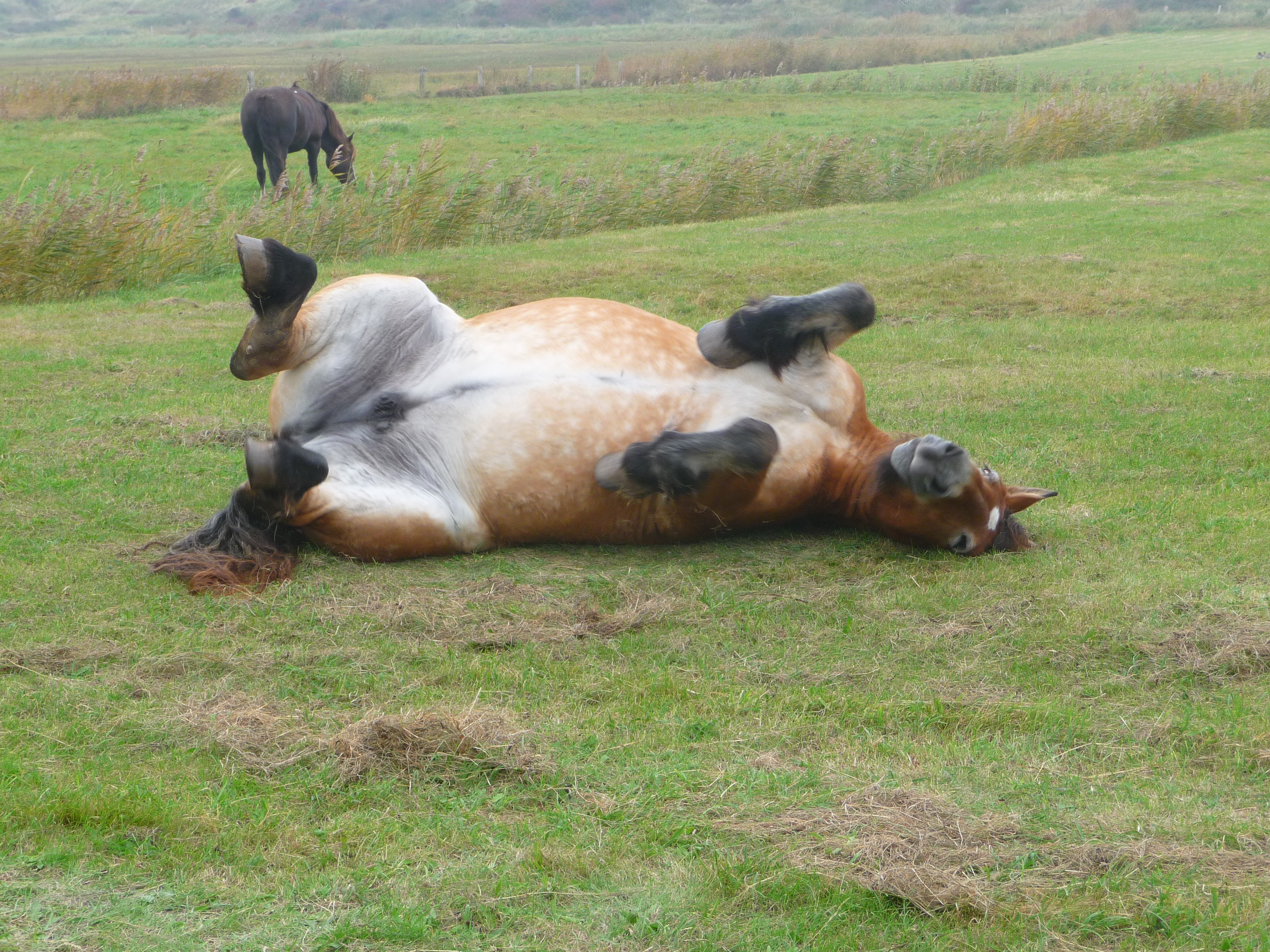
Pangare traits are most visible on the belly

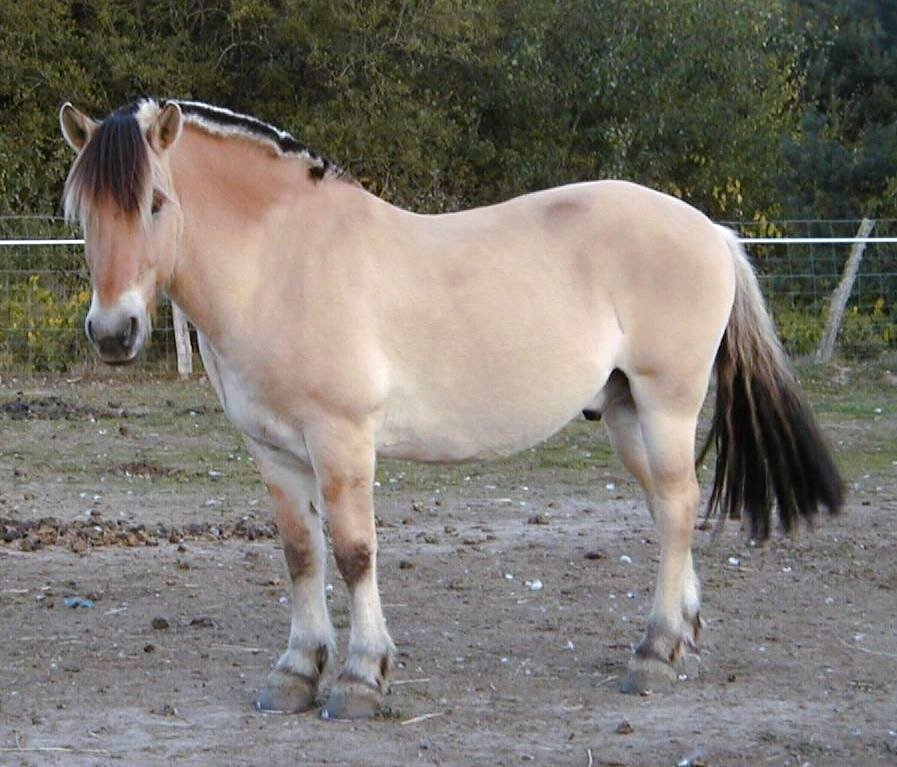
Fjord horses usually express the pangaré trait.

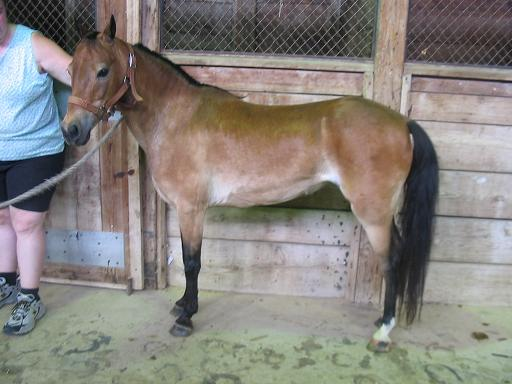
Pangare is less obvious on a summer coat

Pangaré is a coat trait found in some horses that features pale hair around the eyes, muzzle, and underside of the body. These pale areas can extend up to the flanks, throat and chest, behind the elbows, in front of the stifle, and up the buttock. Animals with the pangaré trait are sometimes called "mealy" or "light-pointed". The color of these lighter areas depends on the underlying color and ranges from off-white to light tan. This type of coloration is most often found in breeds such as the Fjord horse, Exmoor Pony, and Haflinger. Wild equids like the Przewalski's horse, onager, African wild ass, kiang as well as the domestic donkey exhibit pangaré as a rule. Pangaré is thought to be a type of protective countershading. Horse foals are often born with "foal pangaré" or light points, especially over black haired areas, which they lose when they shed their foal coats.

At one time, the seal brown coat color was hypothesized to occur from the action of pangaré on a black coat. However, this has been disproven; seal brown horses are a variation of the bay color.

In donkeys, no light points (loss of pangare) is caused by a recessive missense mutation at agouti. The light points (pangare) color is similar to the light bellied agouti color in mice, while the no light points color is similar to recessive black in mammals. In light bellied agouti mice, the agouti mRNA starts with a different noncoding exon depending on whether it is made in the dorsal or ventral region. This leads to a lighter belly color in mice and probably other mammals as well.

== See also ==
- Point coloration
