= Sooty horse =

Trait characterized by black or darker hairs mixed into a horse's coat

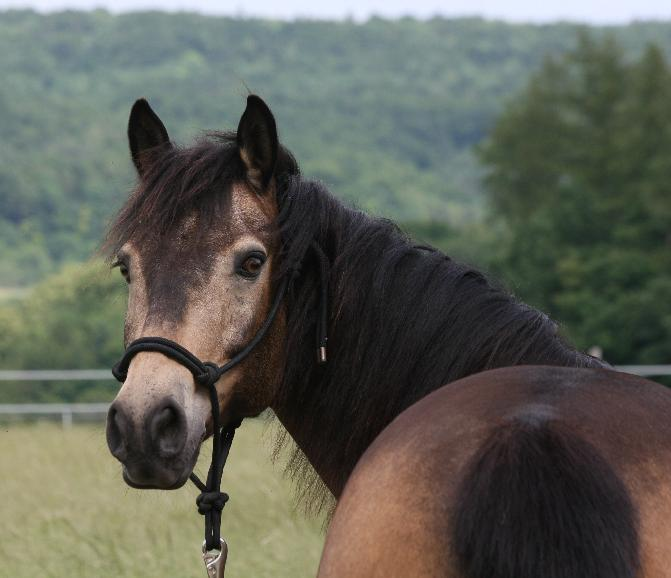
This sooty buckskin shows a dark face mask and the concentration of dark hairs along the topline

A sooty or smutty horse coat color is characterized by black or darker hairs mixed into a horse's coat, typically concentrated along the topline of the horse and less prevalent on the underparts. The effect is especially pronounced on buckskins and palominos. Sootiness is believed to be an inherited trait involving multiple genes, however the details are not yet known. Horses without any visible sooty coloration are termed "clear-coated."

On bay-based horses, the most common type of sooty is black countershading. This darkens the top side of the horse, sometimes turning the back, croup, and shoulder almost black, while leaving the underside of the horse redder. At its darkest, this effect may be confused with seal brown, while in minimal forms the dark hairs may not be noticed. Dapples of red often appear within the dark region. Many horses with the sooty trait have a darker mask on the bony parts of the face.

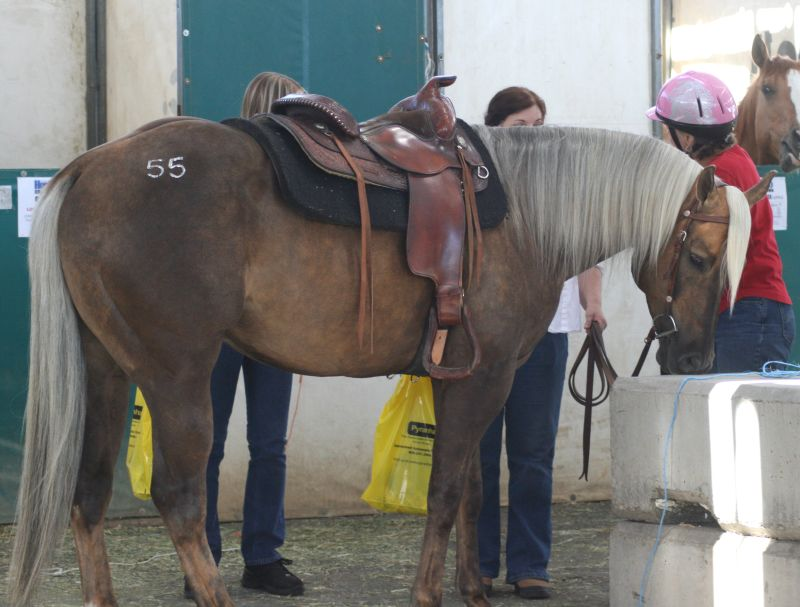
A sooty palomino. Dark areas are more evenly spread out across the body than on the buckskin above.

On chestnut-based horses sooty often has a relatively uniform appearance, unlike the top-down countershading seen on bays. This may indicate that it is caused by a different genetic mechanism. Sootiness can add visually black hairs to chestnut horses, even though their nonextension genotype is expected to prevent black pigment. Chestnut horses with black hairs from sooty are one of the groups called liver chestnut, with the other liver chestnuts being those of a very deep dark red shade. The darkest sooty chestnut horses can look nearly black and are sometimes called "black chestnut". Sootiness on chestnuts tends to avoid the lower leg, which helps to distinguish a black chestnut horse from a black one. When there is unevenness to the sooty pattern on a chestnut-based coat, it's fairly common for the lower parts to be darker than the upper side, though the reverse is also possible. Sooty chestnut-based horses may also show dapples.

Certain feeds tend to darken or lighten the coat in individuals genetically inclined towards smuttiness. Feeds likely to darken the coat include molasses, linseed, copra, sunflower seeds, and alfalfa. Foods high in protein, fat, vitamin A, and trace minerals such as copper, iron, and selenium are also believed to darken the coat. Feeds which tend to keep the coat lighter include grass hays, wheat or oat chaff, and white grains such as oats, barley, or wheat middlings, but it is important to ensure the horse still obtains all essential nutrients.

Although this trait has been called the "sooty gene", similar coat-darkening conditions studied in mice suggest that coat darkening is a polygenic trait. Just as in horses, the degree of sootiness in mice varies widely; some individuals have darker hairs that form a dorsal line, while others have extensive sootiness throughout. A statistical analysis of 1,369 offspring of five Franches-Montagnes stallions indicated that darker shades of chestnut and bay might follow a recessive mode of inheritance.

Rarely, a horse may be born with a reddish color similar to bay foals and darken over a few years to a solid brownish black or sometimes jet-black appearance. This is sometimes seen in Arabians, and rarely in other breeds such as Appaloosas. Sponenberg & Bellone call this trait "dominant black" and discuss it in a separate chapter from sooty. These horses are phenotypically black but currently known genetics cannot distinguish them from bay, so some breeders refer to the color as "black bay".

Some horses have a dark dorsal stripe as seen on duns, but do not have the dun gene, and do not have the lighter coat of a dun. Some consider this a type of sooty. It was long known that the dun locus had at least two alleles, but research in 2015 discovered a third allele named non-dun 1, which is responsible for this stripe.

== See also ==
- Seal brown (horse)
