= Equine vision =

Eyesight capabilities of horses

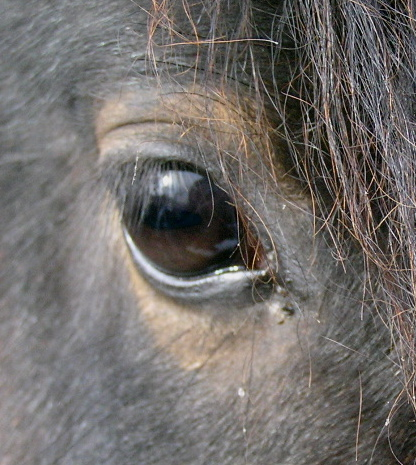
The eye of a horse

The equine eye is one of the largest of any land mammal. Its visual abilities are directly related to the animal's behavior; for example, it is active during both day and night, and it is a prey animal. Both the strengths and weaknesses of the horse's visual abilities should be taken into consideration when training the animal, as an understanding of the horse's eye can help to discover why the animal behaves the way it does in various situations.

== Anatomy ==
The equine eye includes the eyeball and the surrounding muscles and structures, termed the adnexa.

=== Eyeball ===
The eyeball of the horse is not perfectly spherical, but rather is flattened anterior to posterior. However, research has found the horse does not have a ramped retina, as was once thought.

The wall of the eye is made up of three layers: the internal or nervous tunic, the vascular tunic, and the fibrous tunic.

- The nervous tunic (or retina) is made up of cells which are extensions of the brain, coming off the optic nerve. These receptors are light-sensitive, and include cones, which are less light-sensitive, but allow the eye to see color and provide visual acuity, and rod cells, which are more light-sensitive, providing night vision, but only seeing light and dark differences. Since only two-thirds of the eye can receive light, the receptor cells do not need to cover the entire interior of the eye, and line only the area from pupil to the optic disk. The part of the retina covered by light-sensitive cells is therefore termed the pars-optica retinae, and the blind part of the eye is termed the pars-ceaca retinae. The optic disk of the eye, however, does not contain any of these light-sensitive cells, as it is where the optic nerve leaves to the brain. As a result, the optic disk is a blind spot within the eye.
- The vascular tunic (or uvea) is made up of the choroid, the ciliary body, and the iris. The choroid has a great deal of pigment, and is almost entirely made of blood vessels. It forms the tapetum lucidum when it crosses over the fundus of the eye, causing the yellowish-green eye shine when light is directed into the animal's eyes at night. The tapetum lucidum reflects light back onto the retina, allowing for greater absorption in dark conditions. The iris lies between the cornea and the lens, and not only gives the eye its color, (see "eye color," below) but also allows varying amounts of light to pass through its center hole, the pupil.
- The fibrous tunic consists of the sclera and cornea and protects the eye. The sclera (white of the eye) is made up of elastin and collagen. The cornea (clear covering on the front of the eye) is made up of connective tissue and bathed in lacrimal fluid and aqueous humor. This provides it nutrition, as it does not have access to blood vessels.
- The lens of the eye lies posterior to the iris, and is held suspended by the ciliary suspensory ligament and the ciliary muscle, which allows for "accommodation" of the eye: it allows the lens to change shape to focus on different objects. The lens is made up of onion-like layers of tissue.

==== Eye color ====
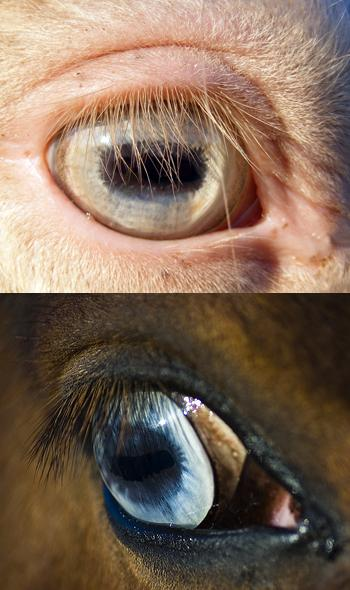
Homozygous cream dilutes ("double-dilutes") have pale blue eyes, while the blue eyes associated with white markings (bottom) are a clearer, deeper color.

Although usually dark brown, the iris may be a variety of colors, including blue, hazel, amber, and green. Blue eyes are not uncommon and are associated with white markings or patterns. The white spotting patterns most often linked to blue eyes are splashed white, frame overo, and sometimes sabino. In the case of horses with white markings, one or both eyes may be blue, or part-blue.

Homozygous cream dilutes, sometimes called double-dilutes, always have light blue eyes to match their pale, cream-colored coats. Heterozygous or single-dilute creams, such as palominos and buckskins, often have light brown eyes. The eyes of horses with the Champagne gene are typically greenish shades: aqua at birth, darkening to hazel with maturity.

Horses are capable of having dichromatic (differently-colored) eyes.

As in humans, much of the genetics and etiology behind eye color are not yet fully understood.

=== Adnexa ===
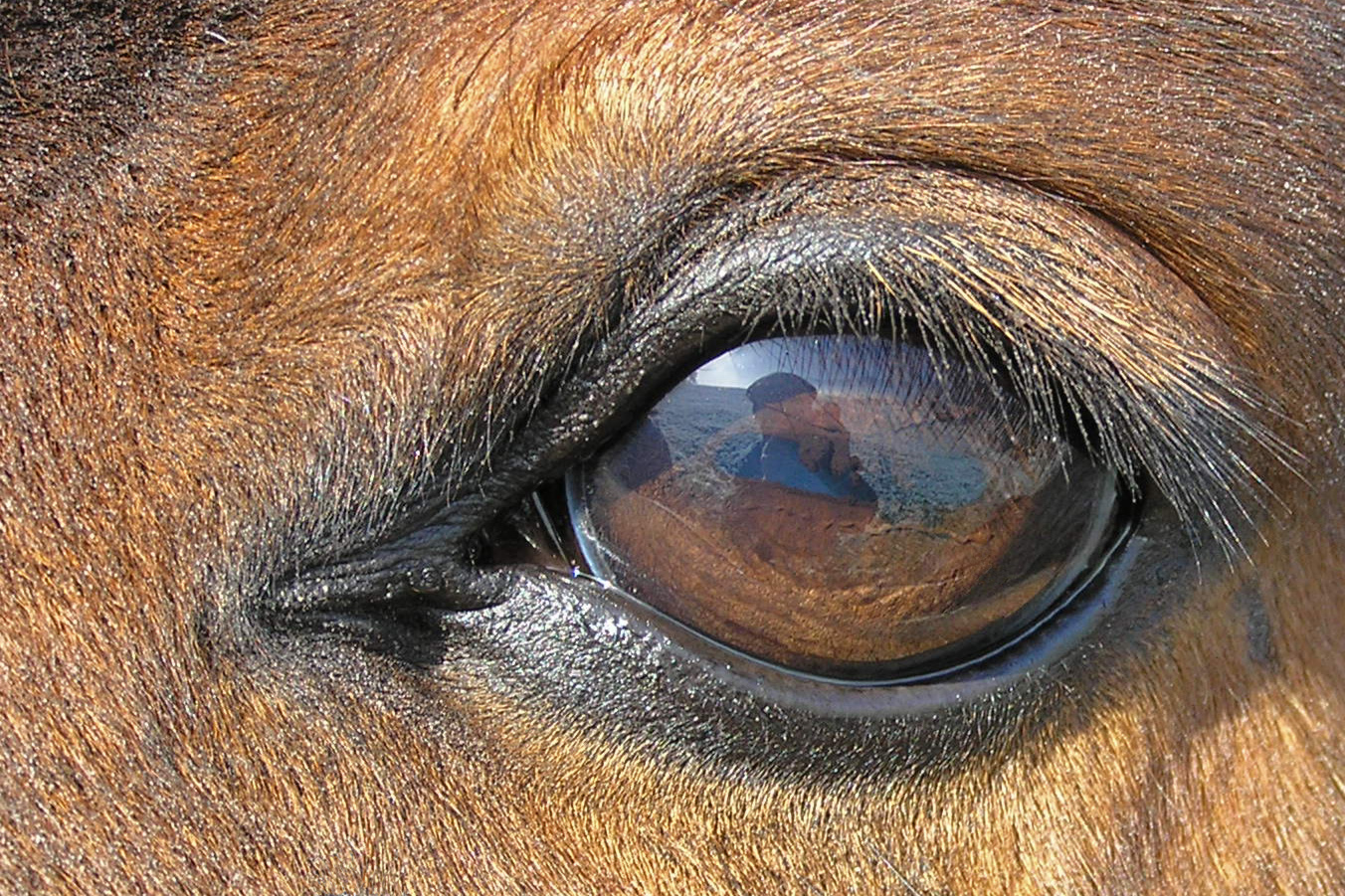
The adnexa of the eye, including the third eyelid (seen in the left corner)

The eyelids are made up of three layers of tissue: a thin layer of skin, which is covered in hair, a layer of muscles which allow the lid to open and close, and the palpebral conjunctiva, which lies against the eyeball. The opening between the two lids forms the palpebral tissue. The upper eyelid is larger and can move more than the lower lid. Unlike humans, horses also have a third eyelid (nictitating membrane) to protect the cornea. It lies on the inside corner of the eye, and closes diagonally over it.

The lacrimal apparatus produces tears, providing nutrition and moisture to the eye, as well as helping to remove any debris that may have entered. The apparatus includes the lacrimal gland and the accessory lacrimal gland, which produce the tears. Blinking spreads the fluid over the eye, before it drains via the nasolacrimal duct, which carries the lacrimal fluid into the nostril of the horse.

The ocular muscles allow the eye to move within the skull.

== Visual capacity ==
=== Visual field ===
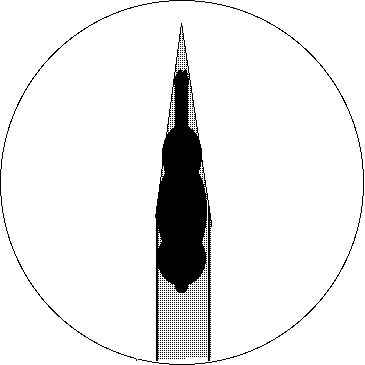
The range of a horse's monocular vision, blind spots in shaded areas

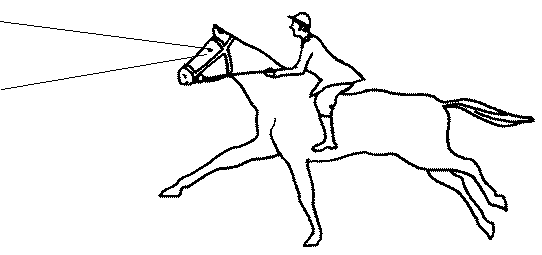
A horse can use binocular vision to focus on distant objects by raising its head.

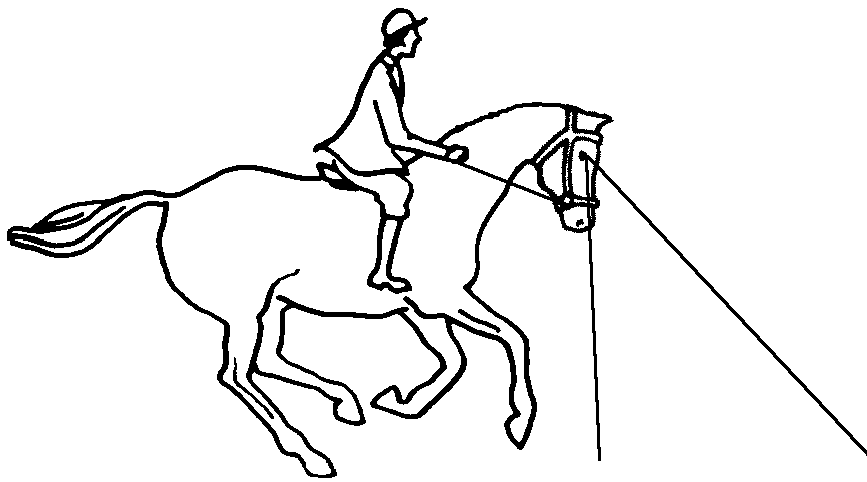
A horse with the head held vertically will have binocular focus on objects near its feet.

Horse eyes are among the largest of any land mammal, and are positioned on the sides of the head (that is, they are positioned laterally). This means horses have a range of vision of about 350°, with approximately 65° of this being binocular vision and the remaining 285° monocular vision.

This provides a horse with the best chance to spot predators. The horse's wide range of monocular vision has two "blind spots", or areas where the animal cannot see: in front of the face, making a cone that comes to a point at about 90–120 cm (3–4 ft) in front of the horse, and right behind its head, which extends over the back and behind the tail when standing with the head facing straight forward. Therefore, as a horse jumps an obstacle, it briefly disappears from sight right before the horse takes off.

The wide range of monocular vision has a trade-off: The placement of the horse's eyes decreases the possible range of binocular vision to around 65° on a horizontal plane, occurring in a triangular shape primarily in front of the horse's face. Therefore, the horse has a smaller field of depth perception than a human. The horse uses its binocular vision by looking straight at an object, raising its head when it looks at a distant predator or focuses on an obstacle to jump. To use binocular vision on a closer object near the ground, such as a snake or threat to its feet, the horse drops its nose and looks downward with its neck somewhat arched.

A horse will raise or lower its head to increase its range of binocular vision. A horse's visual field is lowered when it is asked to go "on the bit" with the head held perpendicular to the ground. This makes the horse's binocular vision focus less on distant objects and more on the immediate ground in front of the horse, suitable for arena distances, but less adaptive to a cross-country setting. Riders who ride with their horses "deep", "behind the vertical", or in a rollkur frame decrease the range of the horse's distance vision even more, focusing only a few feet ahead of the front feet. Riders of jumpers take their horses' use of distance vision into consideration, allowing their horses to raise their heads a few strides before a jump, so the animals are able to assess the jumps and the proper take-off spots.

=== Visual acuity and sensitivity to motion ===
The horse has a "visual streak", or an area within the retina, linear in shape, with a high concentration of ganglion cells (up to 6100 cells/mm^{2} in the visual streak compared to the 150 and 200 cells/mm^{2} in the peripheral area). Horses have better acuity when the objects they are looking at fall in this region. They therefore will tilt or raise their heads, to help place the objects within the area of the visual streak.

The horse is very sensitive to motion, as motion is usually the first alert that a predator is approaching. Such motion is usually first detected in their periphery, where they have poor visual acuity. Horses will usually act defensive and run if something suddenly moves into their peripheral field of vision.

=== Color vision ===
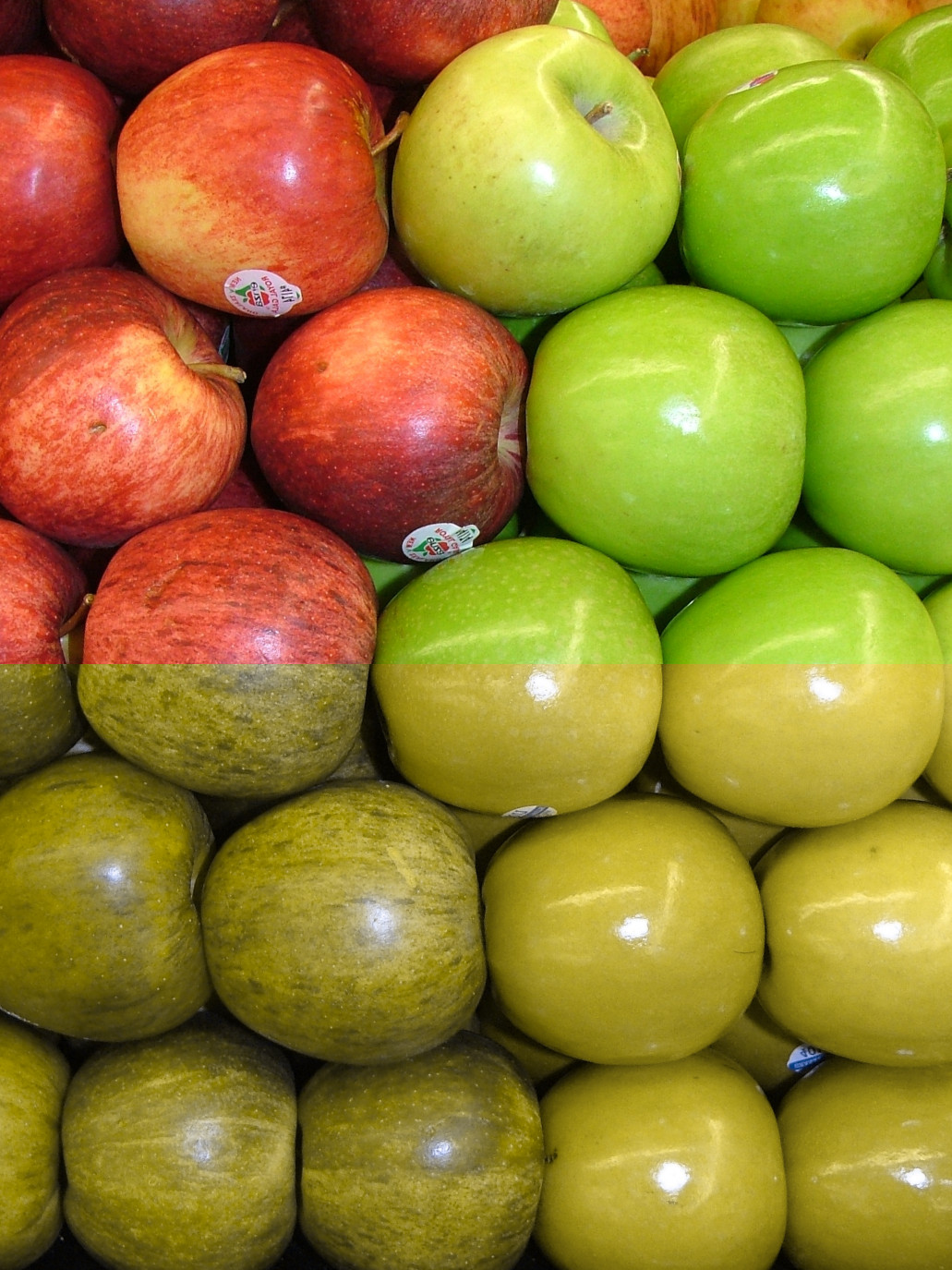
A representation of how a horse possibly sees a red or a green apple (lower half of photo) compared to how red and green apples are usually seen by most humans (top half)

Horses are not color blind; they have two-color or dichromatic vision. This means they distinguish colors in two wavelength regions of visible light, compared to the three-color (trichromic vision) of most humans. In other words, horses naturally see the blue and green colors of the spectrum and the color variations based upon them, but cannot distinguish red. Research indicates that their color vision is somewhat like red–green color blindness in humans, in which certain colors, especially red and related colors, appear more green.

Dichromatic vision is the result of the animal having two types of cones in their eyes: a short-wavelength-sensitive cone (S) that is optimal at 428 nm (blue), and a middle-to-long wavelength sensitive cone (M/L) which sees optimally at 539 nm, more of a yellowish color. This structure may have arisen because horses are most active at dawn and dusk, a time when the rods of the eye are especially useful.

The horse's limited ability to see color is sometimes taken into consideration when designing obstacles for the horse to jump, since the animal will have a harder time distinguishing between the obstacle and the ground if the two are only a few shades different. Therefore, most people paint their jump rails a different color from the footing or the surrounding landscape so that the horse may better judge the obstacle on the approach. Studies have shown that horses are less likely to knock a rail down when the jump is painted with two or more contrasting colors, rather than one single color. It is especially difficult for horses to distinguish between yellows and greens.

=== Sensitivity to light ===
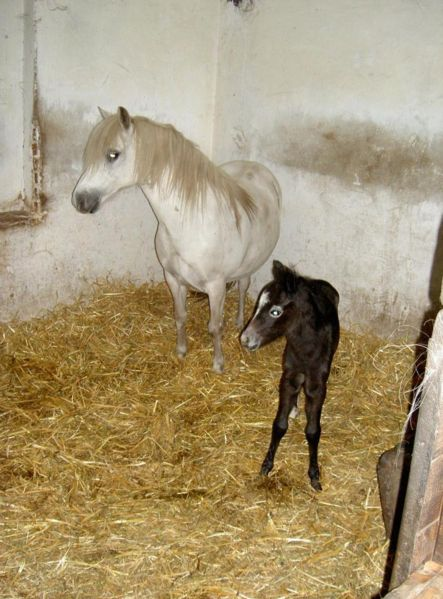
Mare and foal with eyeshine from the tapetum lucidum

Horses have more rods than humans, a high proportion of rods to cones (about 20:1), as well as a tapetum lucidum, giving them superior night vision. This also gives them better vision on slightly cloudy days, relative to bright, sunny days. The large eye of the horse improves achromatic tasks, particularly in dim conditions, which presumably assists in the detection of predators. Laboratory studies show horses are able to distinguish different shapes in low light, including levels mimicking dark, moonless nights in wooded areas. When light decreases to nearly dark, horses can not discriminate between different shapes, but remain able to negotiate around the enclosure and testing equipment in conditions where humans in the same enclosure "stumbled into walls, apparatus, pylons, and even the horse itself."

However, horses are less able to adjust to sudden changes of light than are humans, such as when moving from a bright day into a dark barn. This is a consideration during training, as certain tasks, such as loading into a trailer, may frighten a horse simply because it cannot see adequately. It is also important in riding, as quickly moving from light to dark or vice versa will temporarily make it difficult for the animal to judge what is in front of it.

=== Near- and far-sightedness ===
About a third of domestic horses have myopia (near-sightedness), with few being far-sighted. Wild horses, however, are usually far-sighted.

=== Accommodation ===
Horses have relatively poor "accommodation" (change focus, done by changing the shape of the lens, to sharply see objects near and far), as they have weak ciliary muscles. However, this does not usually place them at a disadvantage, as accommodation is often used when focusing with high acuity on things up close, and horses rarely need to do so. It has been thought that, instead, the horse often tilts its head slightly to focus on things without the benefit of a high degree of accommodation; however, more recent evidence shows that the head movements are linked to the horse's use of its binocular field rather than to focus requirements.

== Disorders ==
Any injury to the eye is potentially serious and requires immediate veterinary attention. Clinical signs of injury or disease include swelling, redness, and abnormal discharge. If untreated, even relatively minor eye injuries may develop complications that could lead to blindness. Common injuries and diseases of the eye include:

- Corneal abrasion
- Corneal ulcer
- Keratitis
- Conjunctivitis
- Uveitis includes recurrent uveitis and periodic ophthalmia ("moon blindness"). Spontaneous equine recurrent uveitis (ERU) occurs in 10-15% of the equine population, with the Appaloosa breed having an eightfold higher risk than the general horse population.
- Habronema
- Keratoconjunctivitis sicca
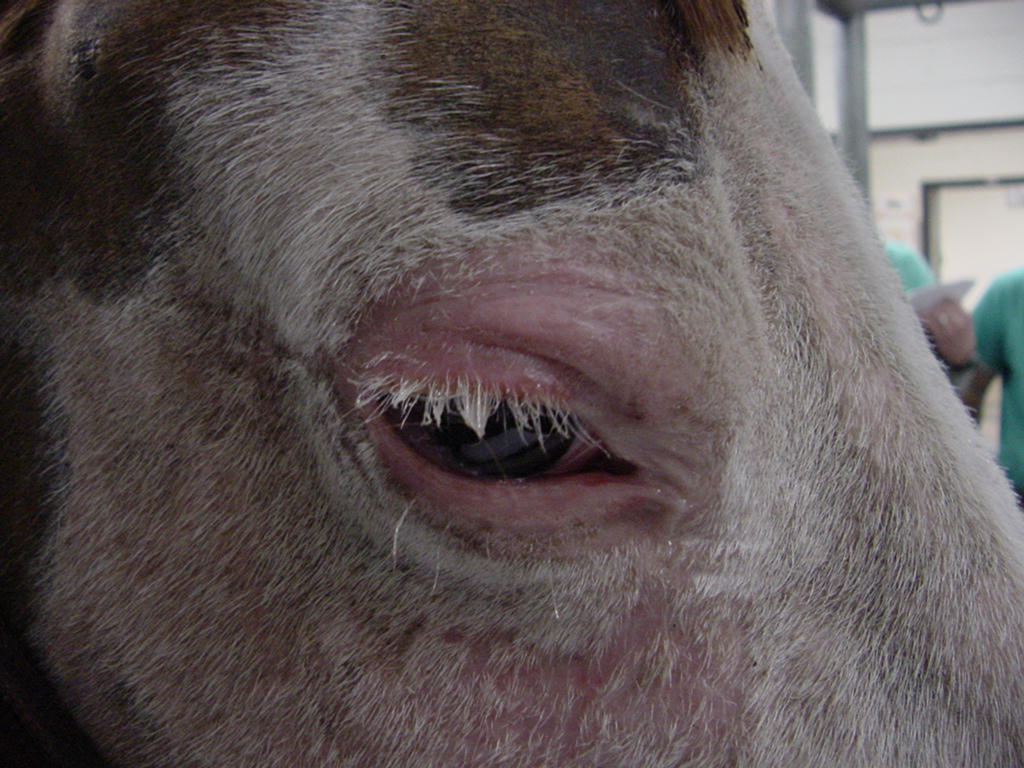
A horse with solar keratosis carcinoma

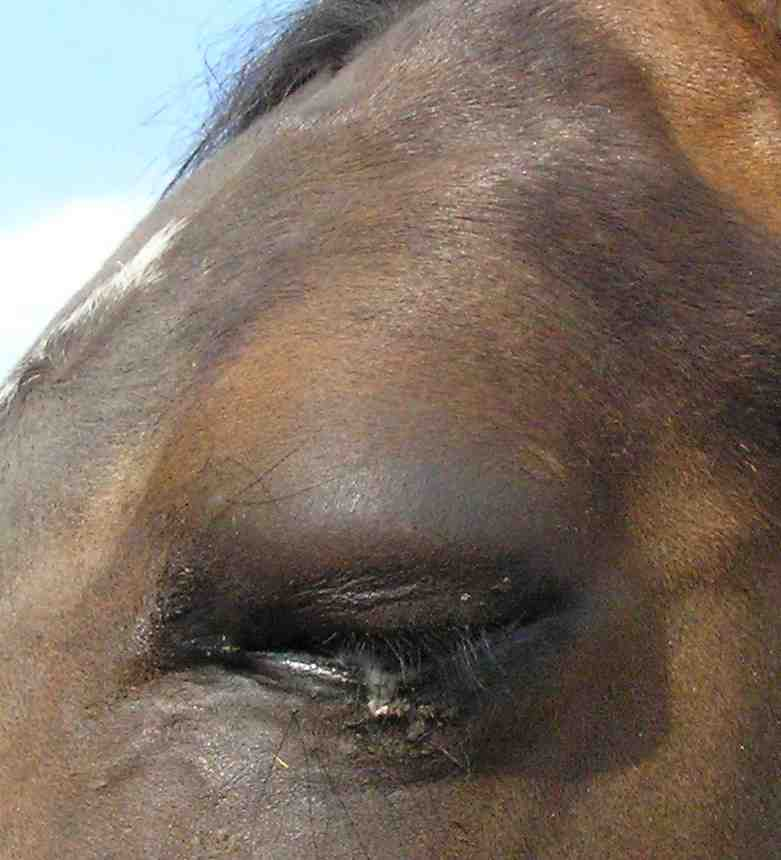
Swelling of the upper eyelid caused by a physical impact to the area
