= Cropout =

Horse with spotting or markings from parents of solid color

A cropout, crop-out or crop out is a horse with body spots, including pinto or leopard complex spotting, or "high white" horse markings, with a sire and dam who both appeared to have been solid-colored. There are several variations in the definition, depending on the breed registry involved. There are multiple genetic reasons that may cause a horse to be a cropout. Sometimes solid-colored horses throw cropouts because some spotting patterns are recessive genes that are not necessarily expressed unless the relevant allele is inherited from both parents. Other times a gene may be a dominant or incomplete dominant but so minimally expressed that the horse looks solid but can pass flashy color on to its offspring.

The term originally came about because excess white in certain breeds was considered an undesirable trait and such foals were deemed ineligible for registration, making them grade horses of little economic value. However, many people liked the flashy color, others sought to keep cropout horses from becoming worthless, and thus new breed registries formed, such as the American Paint Horse Association. In recent years, as DNA testing has become available to verify parentage, breed registries that once excluded cropouts are now accepting them.

The term "cropout" is today most closely associated with horses of American Quarter Horse breeding. These horse are often registered as American Paint Horses, where the term usually refers to horses with overo coloring and whose parents were solid horses not registered with the APHA. It may also refer to sabino-patterned horses. For a cropout horse to be registered as a Paint, both sire and dam must either be Quarter Horses registered with the AQHA, or Thoroughbreds registered with The Jockey Club, plus have coloring that qualifies it for the regular registry of the APHA. Since the AQHA modified its "white rule" to allow registration of cropouts as Quarter Horses, the APHA has also limited its registration of cropouts to those foaled prior to January 1, 2005.

Cropouts also occur when two solid-colored Quarter Horses produce a foal with Appaloosa coloring. The leopard (Lp) gene that creates the distinctive spotting pattern of the Appaloosa has several variations, including the Varnish roan, which may appear to be simple roan coloring to many observers. Thus, the foundation bloodlines of the American Quarter Horse contained some horses who carried the Leopard gene, particularly those from the breeding program of an individual named Coke Roberds.

Though the term "cropout" is most closely associated with Quarter Horses, other breeds, such as the Morgan horse, use the term to describe horses with bold white markings, such as leg markings that up the legs to the belly with irregular, lacy and jagged edges. While the APHA is only open to horses of Thoroughbred and Quarter Horse ancestry, some strongly marked sabino Morgans have been double-registered as Pintos.

The overo gene is one of the most frequent genetic sources of cropouts in Paint horses, as there are some forms of overo that are recessive genes, and a significant number of cropout Paints are overos. At one time, the overo gene was thought to be a dominant gene, though it was acknowledged that more than one gene seemed to influence overo color, and overo offspring from nonspotted Quarter Horse parents was known. However, the full genetic basis for overo patterns is still not fully described.

In the case of most pinto and some Paint cropouts, another cause is the sabino gene, which can exhibit its presence with anything from tall white stockings or bold face markings, known as "high white," to significant spotting patterns. Research indicates that most Sabino patterning is probably polygenic, caused by a gene complex that is not the same as the gene or gene-complex which creates the overo pattern. One sabino gene, SB1, has been identified, but there appear to be others, as many sabino marked horses do not carry SB1. People seeking to produce color via the Sabino gene have noticed that crossing horses who both exhibit at least minimal sabino traits will usually result in a foal with more "loud" (flashy) coloring.

Usually a cropout will not be a tobiano. Because the tobiano gene is dominant, all tobianos have a least one tobiano parent.

== See also ==
- Equine coat color genetics
- Equine coat color
- American Paint Horse
- Appaloosa
- Pinto horse
  - Sabino horse
  - Overo
- Horse markings
