= Splashed white =

Horse coat colour

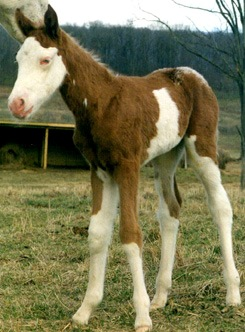
The white head, tail, and lower portions of this foal are typical of splashed white. The impression of the pattern is like the horse has been dipped in white paint.

Splashed white or splash is a horse coat color pattern in the "overo" group of spotting patterns that produces pink-skinned, white markings. Many splashed whites have very modest markings, while others have the distinctive "dipped in white paint" pattern. Blue eyes are a hallmark of the pattern, and splash may account for otherwise "solid" blue-eyed horses. Splashed white occurs in a variety of geographically divergent breeds, from Morgans in North America to Kathiawari horses in India. The splashed white pattern is also associated with congenital deafness, though most splashed whites have normal hearing. Splashed white can be caused by multiple variants across two different genes, for which genetic testing is available.

== Characteristics ==
The splashed white pattern is characterized by the appearance of having been dipped, feet-first, into white paint. Blue eyes are common, but not universal. The margins of the white markings are crisp, smooth, blocky, and well-defined. The head and legs are white, and the tail is often white or white-tipped. The underside of the body is white, and a connected white patch often spreads smoothly up either side of the thorax. On its own, the splashed white pattern is seldom responsible for white markings that reach the topline, and so it has been categorized as one of the "overo" patterns by Paint horse and Pinto horse registries.

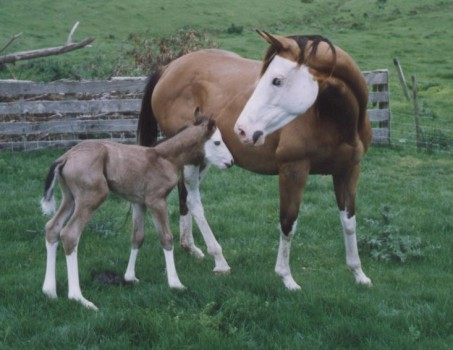
Splashed white mare and foal with mask-like white faces, blue eyes, and dark-colored spots on their lips.

=== Minimal splashed whites ===
The minimal expression of the splashed white pattern can include few or no white markings at all. When only minimal markings are present, other qualities can belie splashed white. Stars and snips may be lopsided, off-center, or otherwise strangely placed. Blazes are usually blocky or straight-edged, and bottom-heavy. Splashed white blazes may also be crooked or skewed to one side. Sabinos with a bold blaze almost invariably have white on the lip or chin, and this is not the case for the facial white of a minimally marked splash; the upper lip typically remains colored. Leg markings in a minimally marked splashed white range from hind coronets to high-whites on all four, or marked hindlegs and unmarked forelegs. While sabino leg markings are often tapering with distal patches, the leg markings on a splashed white usually have crisp borders.

The most reliable identifier of the splashed white pattern is one or more blue, or parti-colored eyes.

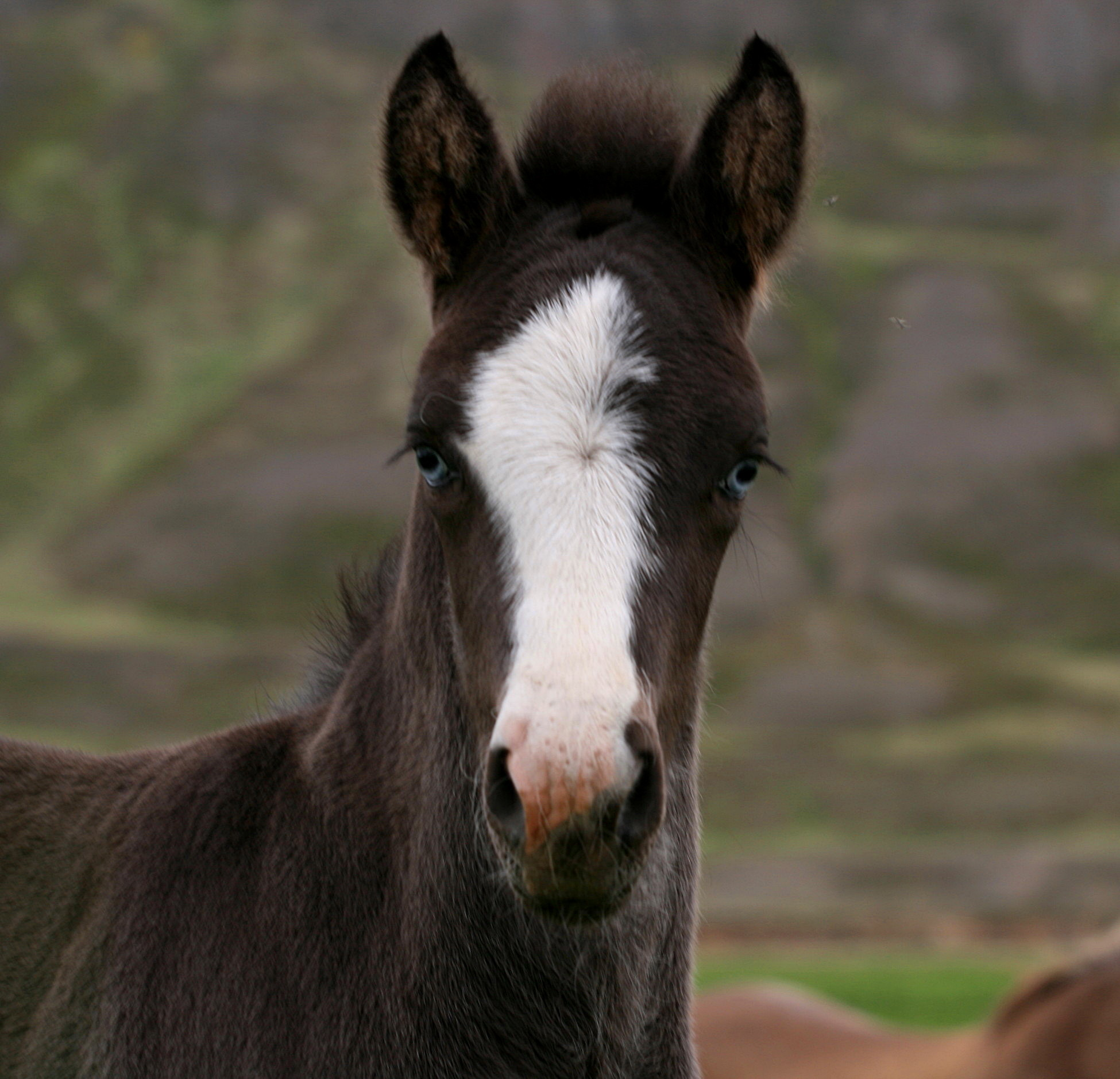
Bright blue eyes and a skewed blaze that does not reach the lip suggest splashed white genes are present in this Icelandic foal.

== Classification ==
Some breed registries make a distinction between pinto horses and solid horses which may have white markings.

Breed registries for which minimum or maximum white markings are a factor in registration have created imaginary lines to simplify the selection process:

- From the ear, to the eye, to the corner of the mouth, to the chin groove,
- the knee on the foreleg, and
- the hock on the hindleg.

White markings extending past these lines are considered "pinto", "paint" or "colored" while white markings which do not cross these lines are not considered to suggest these traits. However, horses without "excessive white markings" can still have the potential to produce "high white" or distinctly spotted offspring. Splashed white horses have produced generations of "solid" horses, followed by an errant, classically marked splashed white. Discreetly marked splashed whites are responsible for some families of cropout American Quarter Horses.

== Splashed white mimics ==
As sabino-type markings also originate on the underside, some splashed whites can be mistaken for cleanly marked sabinos. Both patterns can be present on the same horse, but splashed white markings are crisp and blocky, and horizontally distributed. In particular, the face markings of splashed whites are straight-edged and bottom heavy, whereas those of sabinos are often tapering or feathered, and often vertical in orientation. Splashed white markings also generally have smoother edges than sabino. The presence of additional white patterning genes can intensify the amount or obscure the characteristics of splashed white markings.

In the Gypsy horse, the pattern called "blagdon" is described as "a solid colour with white "splashed" up from underneath."

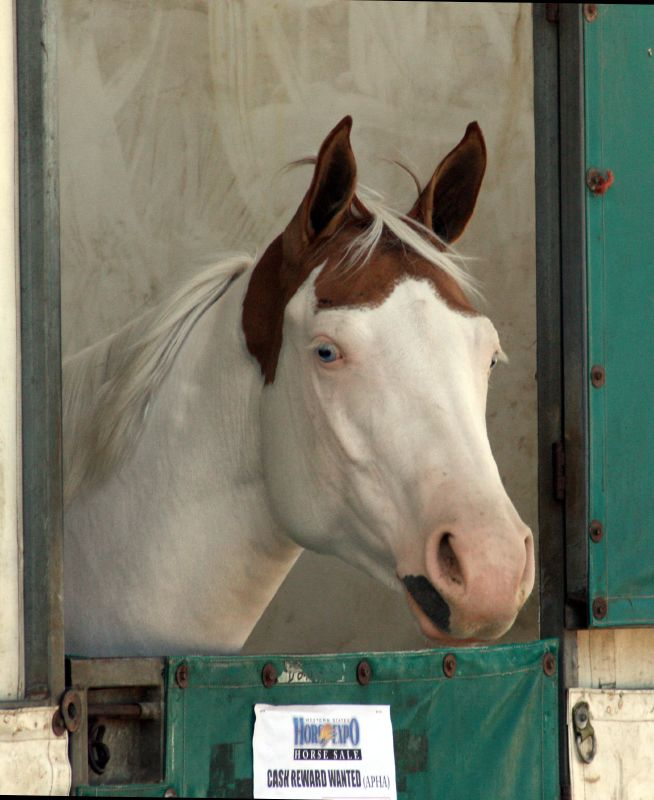
Clean, crisp white markings that do not reach the ears, pigmented "medicine hat" marking across ears and poll, a colored lip spot, and blue eyes indicate this "tovero" is probably a tobiano-splash blend.

== Health concerns ==
Potential health concerns involving splashed white are deafness and, for some rare variants, embryonic viability.

There is some association between splashed white and congenital deafness in horses that are very white, though many or most splashed white horses have normal hearing. This type of deafness is probably similar to instances of deafness in white or piebald, blue-eyed examples in other species. In white-coated cats and dogs with deafness, an absence of melanocytes in the inner ear leads to death of the hair cells, which are necessary for perceiving sound. The presence of pigment around the outside of the ears - which most splash horses have - does not prove the presence of that necessary pigment in the inner ear. There must be pigment inside the inner ear to prevent this problem. Domestic horses often cope well with deafness, and deaf horses may go undiagnosed. Some deaf horses are more skittish than normal, while others are distinctly calmer. Deafness in horses can be diagnosed by brainstem auditory evoked potential (BAEP), which is minimally invasive and requires no sedation and minimal restraint. While blue eyes and a white face are often associated with deafness in other species, apron-faced, non-splash horses are not known to be deaf. Nor is the presence of one blue, one normal eye indicative of unilateral deafness. The case horse in Hardland's 2006 case study had one blue eye, while the other was parti-colored, but the horse was bilaterally deaf.

Some variants of splashed white may produce non-viable embryos if homozygous. SW1 and SW2 have been found in homozygous form, but SW3, SW4, SW5, and SW6 may or may not be homozygous lethal. At present, this cannot be ruled in or out.

In other species, changes to PAX3 (where SW2 and SW4 are found) can cause cleft palates and other congenital defects.

== Inheritance ==
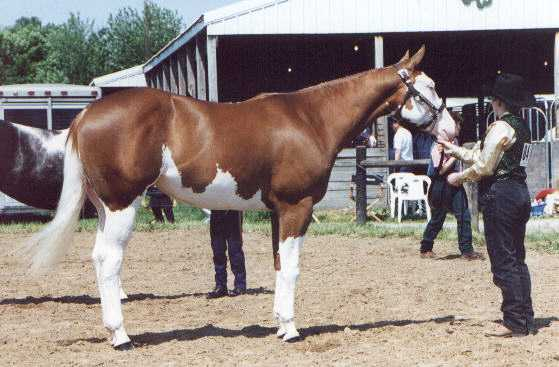
This American Paint Horse has a white tail and a large, connected area of white across the lower part of her body, suggesting splash genes. The jagged edges are possibly due to sabino traits.

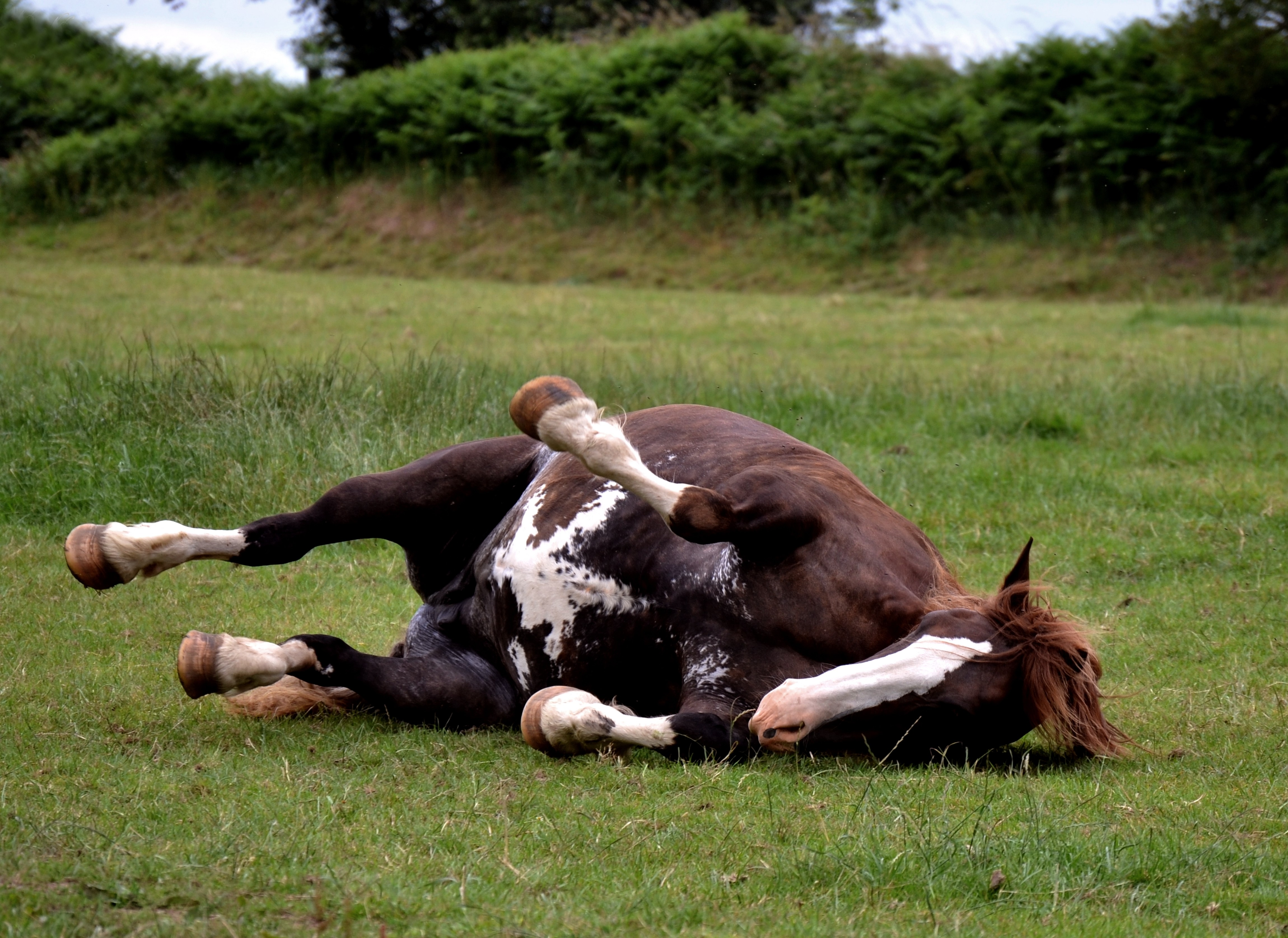
A mare that tested positive for SW1. Note the sabino-like jagged and lace-like pattern on the belly.

DNA tests exist for six forms of splashed white across two different genes. SW1, SW3, SW5, and SW6 are alleles of MITF, while SW2 and SW4 are alleles of PAX3.

SW1 is the most common known variant. It is incomplete dominant, meaning it has different effects depending on whether one copy or two copies are present. Horses heterozygous for SW1 (one copy) may have a minimal splash pattern, or may be completely solid. Horses homozygous for SW1 (two copies) have the more extensive classic splashed white pattern.

The splashed white pattern was first studied in Finnish Drafts and Welsh ponies by Klemola in 1933. He divided pinto patterns into a dominant "piebald", describing patterns now known to come from tobiano, frame overo, and sabino, and a recessive "splashed white". His splashed white appears to be describing only the more extensive form of the pattern seen when two copies of SW1 are present.

Originally believed to be very rare outside of Europe, splash is turning out to be more common than previously thought, possibly due to the pattern's tendency to masquerade as modest markings. For example, minimally marked splashed whites have been responsible for cropouts among American Quarter Horses.

There may be additional forms not yet mapped. In addition to breeds identified as carrying the SW1, -2 or -3 alleles, color patterns described as splashed white but not yet verified via genetic testing have also been identified in American Saddlebreds, Shire horse, Clydesdales, and the Irish Tinker or Gypsy horse.

It is likely that many splashed whites go unidentified, whether because their markings are too minimal to register as "pinto" with breeders, confusion with sabino, or the confounding effect of multiple white spotting patterns. Just as the presence of additional white patterning genes can increase the amount of white, other genes may be responsible for restricting the expression of splash.

The genetic mechanisms behind certain traits, such as blue eyes in a few Arabian horses with otherwise minimal markings, have yet to be identified, though there is speculation that splash genes could be involved.

=== Alleles ===
Informal name	Technical name	Gene
SW1	MITF^{prom1}	MITF
SW2	PAX3^{C70Y}	PAX3
SW3	MITF^{C280Sfs*20}	MITF
Macchiato	MITF^{N310S}	MITF
SW4	PAX3:p.Pro32Arg	PAX3
SW5	MITF^{del}	MITF
SW6	SW6	MITF
SW7		

== Prevalence ==
SW1 is the most prevalent. It appears to be several hundred years old and predates the development of modern breeds. SW1 has been identified in the American Quarter Horse, American Paint Horse, Icelandic horse, Miniature horse, Morgan horse, Shetland pony, Trakehner, and Finnhorse.

SW2 is a PAX3 mutation mistakenly thought to originate with a single Quarter Horse mare foaled in 1987. However, it seems it is actually older, and it has been found in Quarter Horses and Paint horses as well as Noriker and Lipizzan horses.

SW3 has been exclusively found in certain lines of Quarter horses and Paints, and is very rare.

Another allele of splash informally called "Macchiato" has only been found in a single Franche-Montagne horse, probably a spontaneous mutation, and that individual was sterile.

SW4 was found in a family of Appaloosa horses.

SW5 was found in a family of American Paint Horses.

SW6 is thought to originate with a dual registered Paint horse and Quarter horse stallion.

Horses may carry more than one splash mutation.

== See also ==
- Dominant white
