= Horse markings =

Areas on a horse that differ from body color

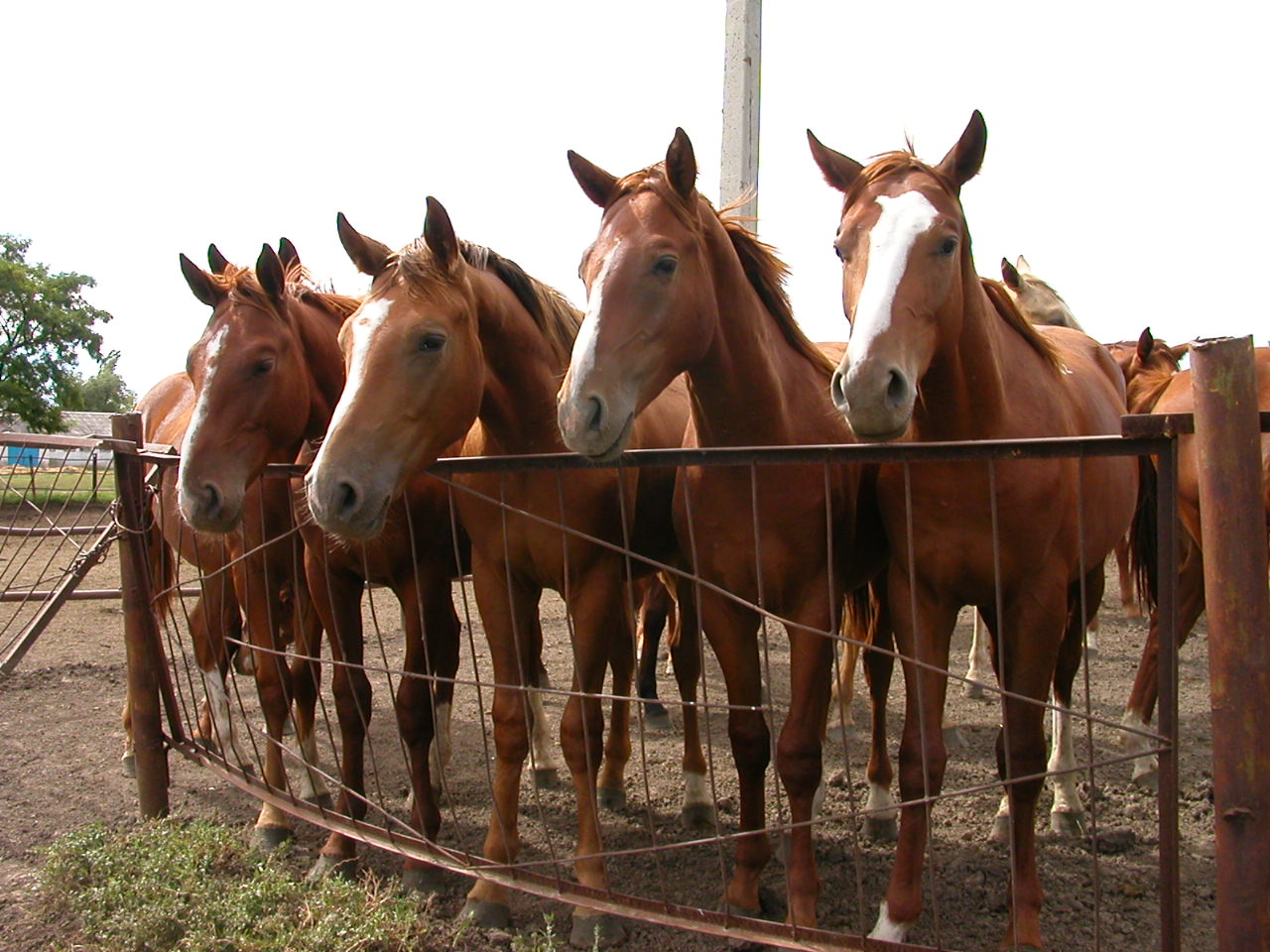
All of these horses are chestnut colored, but unique markings can be used to identify individuals.

Markings on horses are usually distinctive white areas on an otherwise dark base coat color. Most horses have some markings, and they help to identify the horse as a unique individual. Markings are present at birth and do not change over the course of the horse's life. Most markings have pink skin underneath most of the white hairs, though a few faint markings may occasionally have white hair with no underlying pink skin. Markings may appear to change slightly when a horse grows or sheds its winter coat, however this difference is simply a factor of hair coat length; the underlying pattern does not change.

On a gray horse, markings visible at birth may become hidden as the horse turns white with age, but markings can still be determined by trimming the horse's hair closely, then wetting down the coat to see where there is pink skin and black skin under the hair.

Recent studies have examined the genetics behind white markings and have located certain genetic loci that influence their expression.

In addition to white markings on a base coat, there are other markings or patterns that are used to identify horses as with Appaloosa, pinto or brindle, as well as artificial markings such as branding.

== Types of white markings ==
=== Facial markings ===
Facial markings are usually described by shape and location. There may be more than one distinct facial marking and if so, will be named separately. Occasionally, when a white marking extends over an eye, that eye may be blue instead of brown, though this is not consistently seen in all cases.

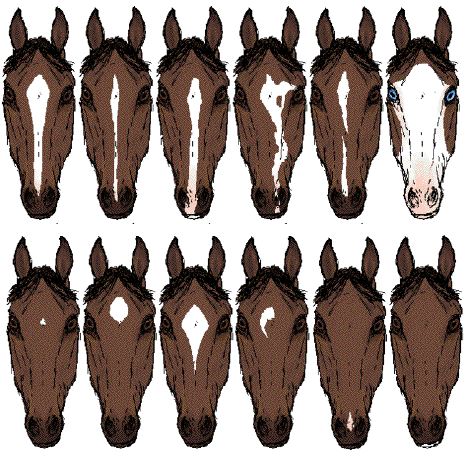
Facial markings. Top row, L-R: blaze, stripe, stripe (or thin blaze) and snip, irregular blaze, interrupted stripe, bald face. Bottom row, L-R: faint star, star, star and strip, irregular star, snip, lip masking.

Common facial markings are:

- Blaze: a wide white stripe down the middle of the face.
- Strip, stripe, or race: a narrow white stripe down the middle of the face.
- Bald face: a very wide blaze, extending to or past the eyes. Some, but not all, bald faced horses also have blue eyes.
- Star: a white marking between or above the eyes. If a stripe or blaze is present, a star must be significantly wider than the vertical marking to be designated separately.
- Snip: a white marking on the muzzle, between the nostrils.

Additional terms used to describe facial markings include the following:

- Faint: A small but permanent marking that usually consists of white hairs without any underlying pink skin.
- Interrupted: A marking, usually a strip or blaze, that is broken and not solid for the entire length of the face.
- Connected: Occasionally used to describe distinctively different markings that happen to be joined to one another
- Irregular or crooked: A marking, usually a strip or blaze, that does not have a more or less straight path.
- Lip markings: have no specialized names, usually are described by location, such as "lower lip," "chin", etc. Lip markings may indicate presence of the sabino color pattern.
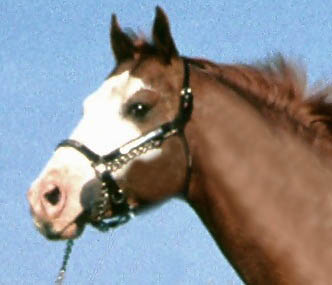
A baldface

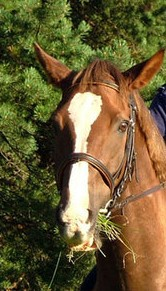
A blaze

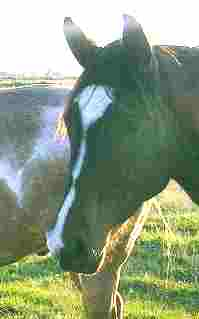
A star, interrupted stripe, and snip

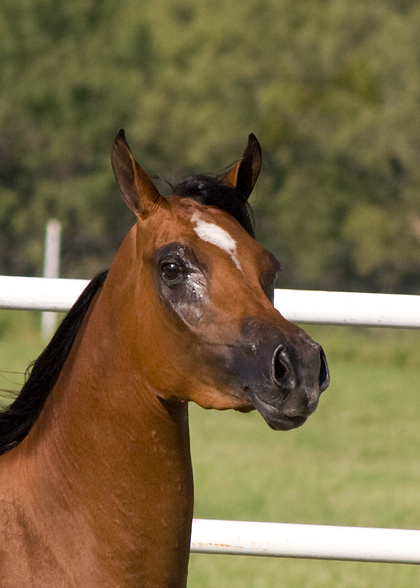
A star

=== Leg markings ===
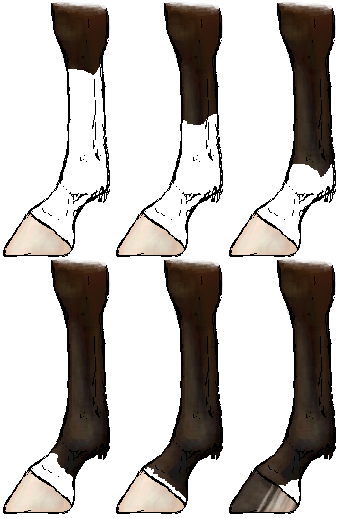
Leg markings. Top row, L-R: Stocking, Sock or Boot, Fetlock or Sock. Bottom row, L-R: Pastern, Coronet, Partial Pastern

Leg markings are usually described by the highest point of the horse's leg that is covered by white. As a general rule, the horse's hoof beneath a white marking at the coronary line will also be light-colored ("white"). If a horse has a partial marking or ermine spots at the coronary band, the hoof may be both dark and light, corresponding with the hair coat immediately above. Where the leopard gene is present, the hoof may be striped even if markings are not visible at the coronary band.

From tallest to shortest, common leg markings are:

- Stocking: white marking that extends at least to the bottom of the knee or hock, sometimes higher.
- Sock: white marking that extends higher than the fetlock but not as high as the knee or hock. This marking is sometimes called a "boot."
- Fetlock or Sock: white marking that extends over the fetlock, occasionally called a "boot."
- Pastern: white marking that extends above the top of the hoof, but stops below the fetlock.
- Coronet: white just above the hoof, around coronary band, usually no more than 1 inch (2.5 cm) above the hoof.

Additional terms used to describe white leg markings include:

- Irregular: A marking within the broad confines of a given height, but with significantly uneven edges. Indicated by the highest point of the white. Most often used to describe certain types of stockings.
- Partial: An irregular marking that only extends up part of the leg to the height indicated, sometimes with the other side of the leg dark. Usually used to describe socks and other short markings.
- "High White:" White stockings that extend above the knee or hock, sometimes extending past the stifle onto the flank or belly, considered characteristic of the sabino color pattern.
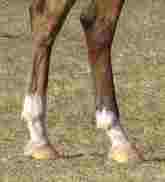
Shorter marking is sometimes called a "fetlock" or a "sock," taller marking is clearly a sock

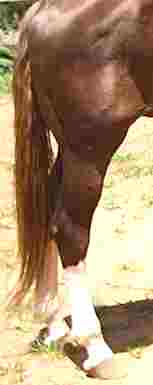
A stocking

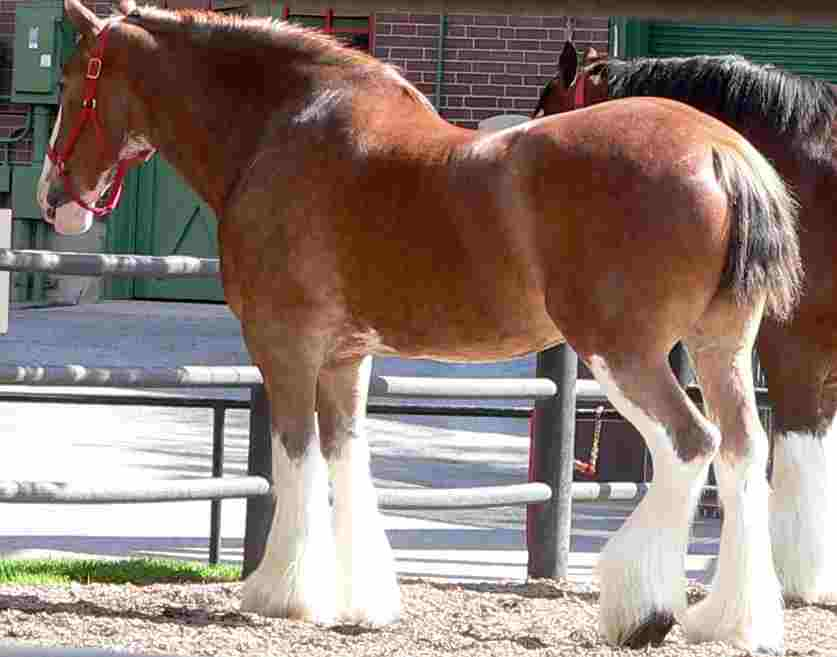
A horse with "high white," including stockings on all four legs

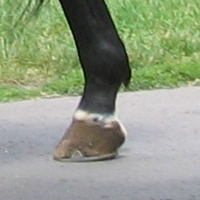
A coronet marking

== Inheritance of white markings ==
A horse's genes influence whether it will have white markings, though the exact genes involved could differ between breeds. Chestnut horses generally have more extensive white markings than bay or black horses. Horses with the W20 allele typically have white face and leg markings.

== Non-white markings ==
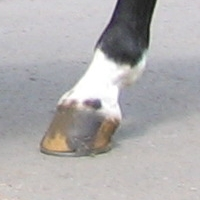
Ermine marks (just above the hoof)

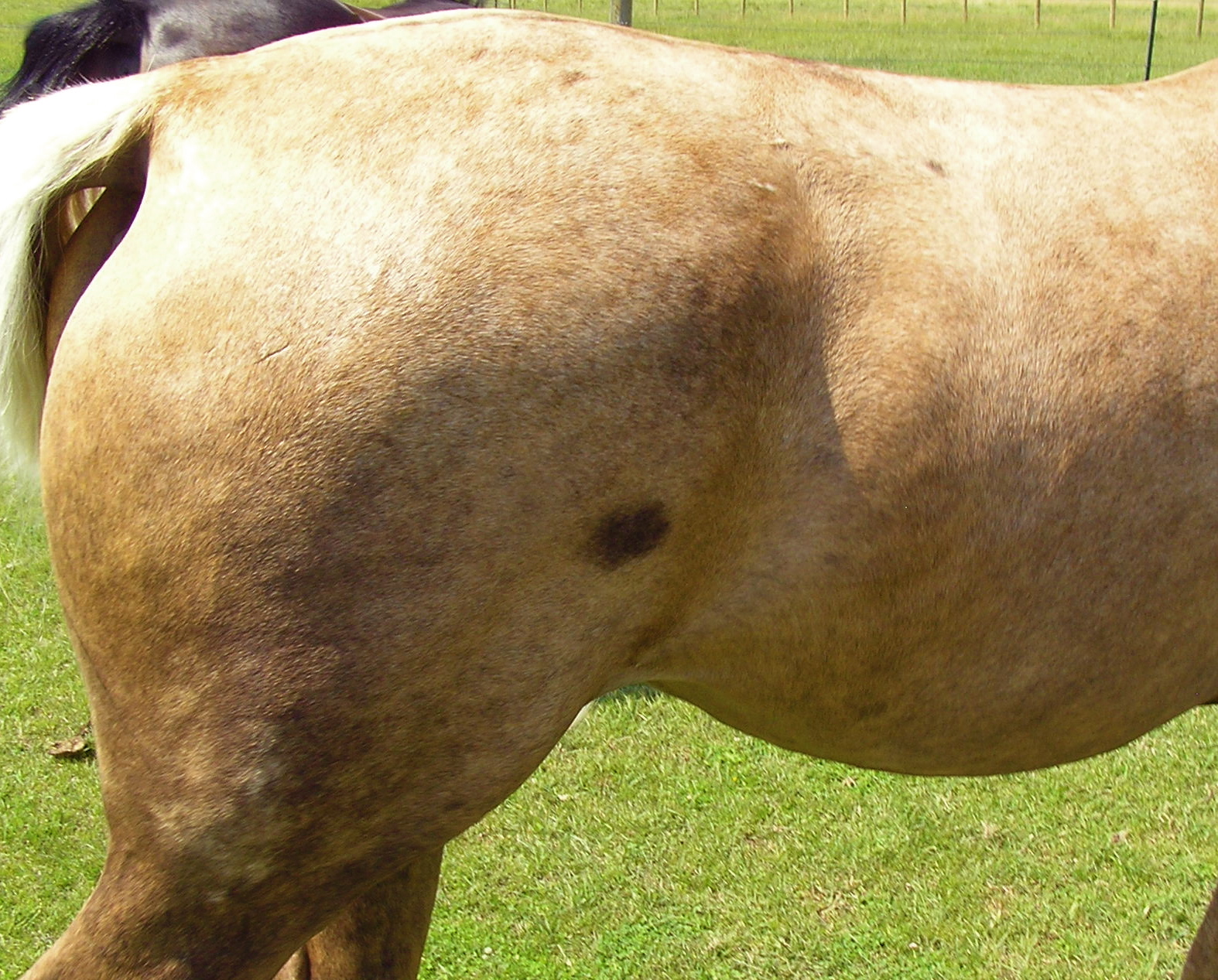
A Bend-Or Spot

- Bend-Or spots: Dark faint spotting, usually seen on horses with a chestnut or palomino coat color.
- Ermine marks: The occurrence of black marks on a white marking, most often seen on leg markings just above the hoof. May cause the hoof to be striped.
- "Medicine hat": An unusual type of pinto or paint coloring where the horse has dark ears and poll (like a hat on the head), but surrounded on all sides of the head and neck by white.
- Shield: A dark pinto marking where the horse has a dark colored chest, surrounded completely by white on the shoulders, legs, belly and neck. Occasionally used to describe the rarer example of a horse with a totally dark head surrounded completely by white.

== Other markings ==
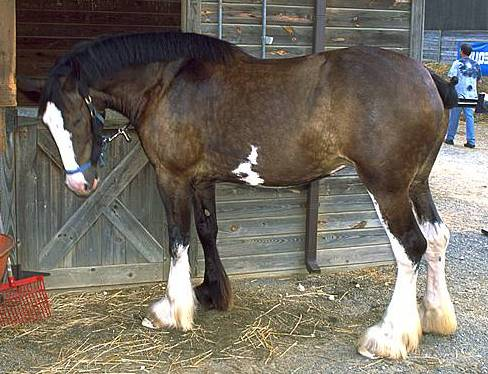
This horse has a belly spot. It also has a blaze and three stockings

Horses may have isolated body spots that are not large or numerous enough to qualify them as an Appaloosa, Pinto or Paint. Such markings are usually simply called "body spots," sometimes identified by location, i.e. "belly spot," "flank spot," etc. When this type of isolated spotting occurs, it may involve one of the splashed white, dominant white, or sabino alleles.

Horses may develop white markings over areas where there was an injury to the animal, either to cover scar tissue from a cut or abrasion, or to reflect harm to the underlying skin or nerves. One common type of scarring that produces patches of white hairs are "saddle marks," which are round or oval marks on either side of the withers, produced by a pinching saddle that had been worn over a long period of time.

=== Natural markings ===
Birdcatcher spots are small white spots, about the size of a dime to the size of a quarter. They have not been linked to any specific breed, but they do tend to run in families. These spots may occur late in a horse's life, or may occur and then disappear. The spots may look like scars, but they are not caused by skin damage. The name comes from a Thoroughbred horse named Birdcatcher, who had similar flecks of white on his flank and tail.

Ticking or rabicano involves white flecks of hair at the flank, and white hairs at the base of the tail. The most minimal form can have only striped white frosting at the base of the tail, called a coon tail or skunk tail. Flecks of white on the root of the tail or scattered over the flanks may also be called Birdcatcher ticks.

=== Scarring, skin disease and injury ===
Scarring on a horse usually results in white hairs growing in over the injured area, though occasionally there may be no hair growth over the scar at all.

- Rainscald or Dermatophilus congolensis can leave a horse with small white spots, especially along the topline.
- Roan horses often develop patches of solid (dark) hair on the roan sections of their bodies wherever there has been any scratch or damage to underlying skin, even if only slight. These are sometimes called "corn marks" or "corn spots."
- A type of deliberate human-created scarring that results in white hair is freeze branding, a method of permanently marking a horse for identification purposes. Some forms of hot branding may also scar lightly enough to leave white hairs rather than bare skin.
- Leg scars left from pin firing or bar firing, in which an injury is blistered with hot iron, can leave dots or lines of white hair in a very distinct pattern. This is usually seen on Thoroughbreds that have raced. This treatment is not commonly practiced, but such markings are still occasionally seen.
- Scars from accidents, as well as old injury sites (such as bowed tendons), can also be used to identify a horse.
- Saddle marks may be seen on the back or withers as a patch of white hairs, usually a result of wearing an improperly-fitted saddle for long periods, but also could be related to straightforward long-term saddle wear, unclean saddle blankets and other causes. White marks just forward of the withers may be the result of an ill-fitting horse blanket worn for a long period of time.
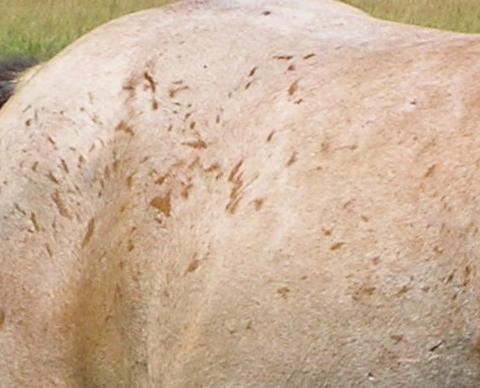
Corn marks on a roan

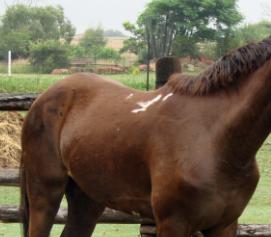
Saddle marks

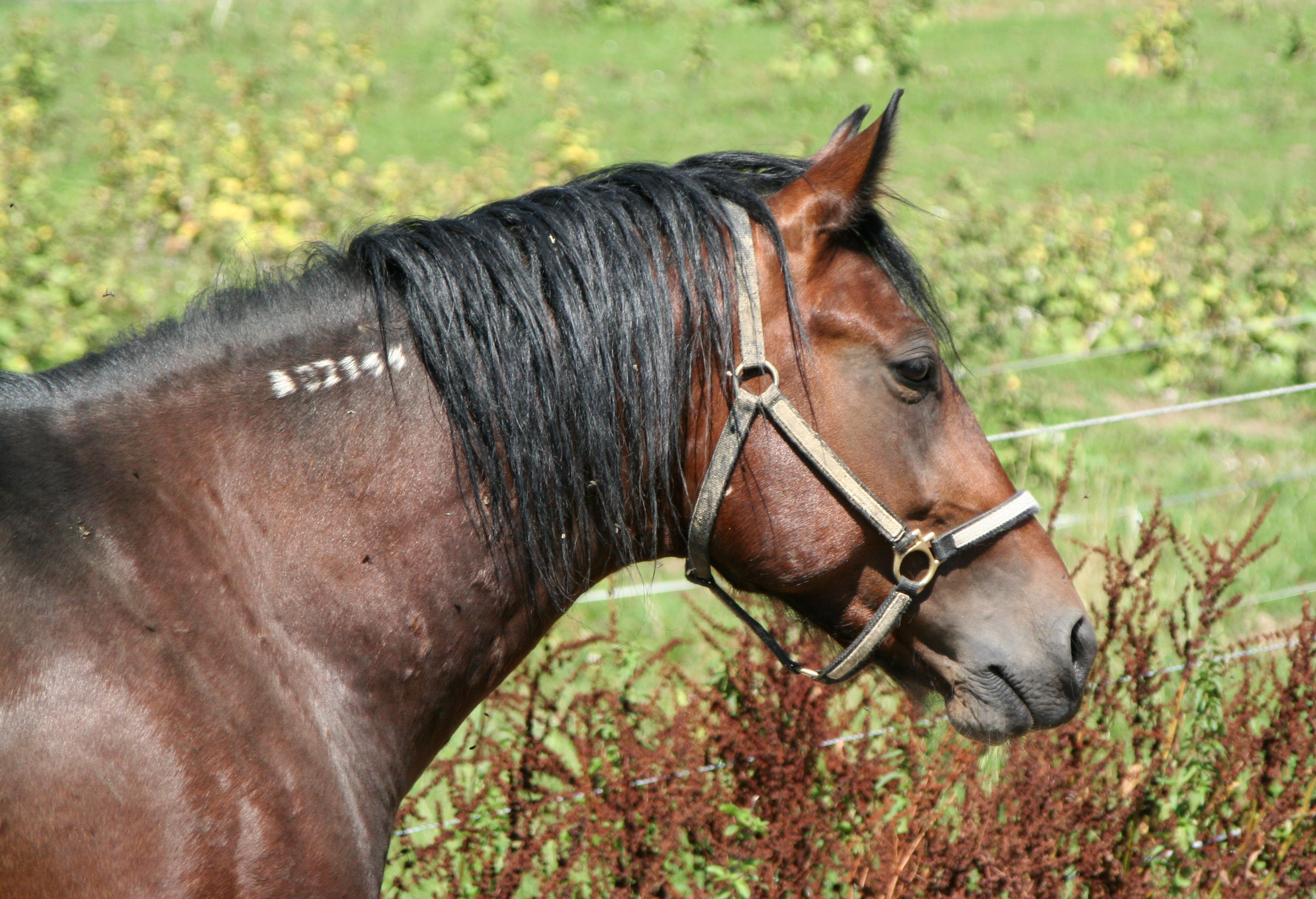
Freeze branding

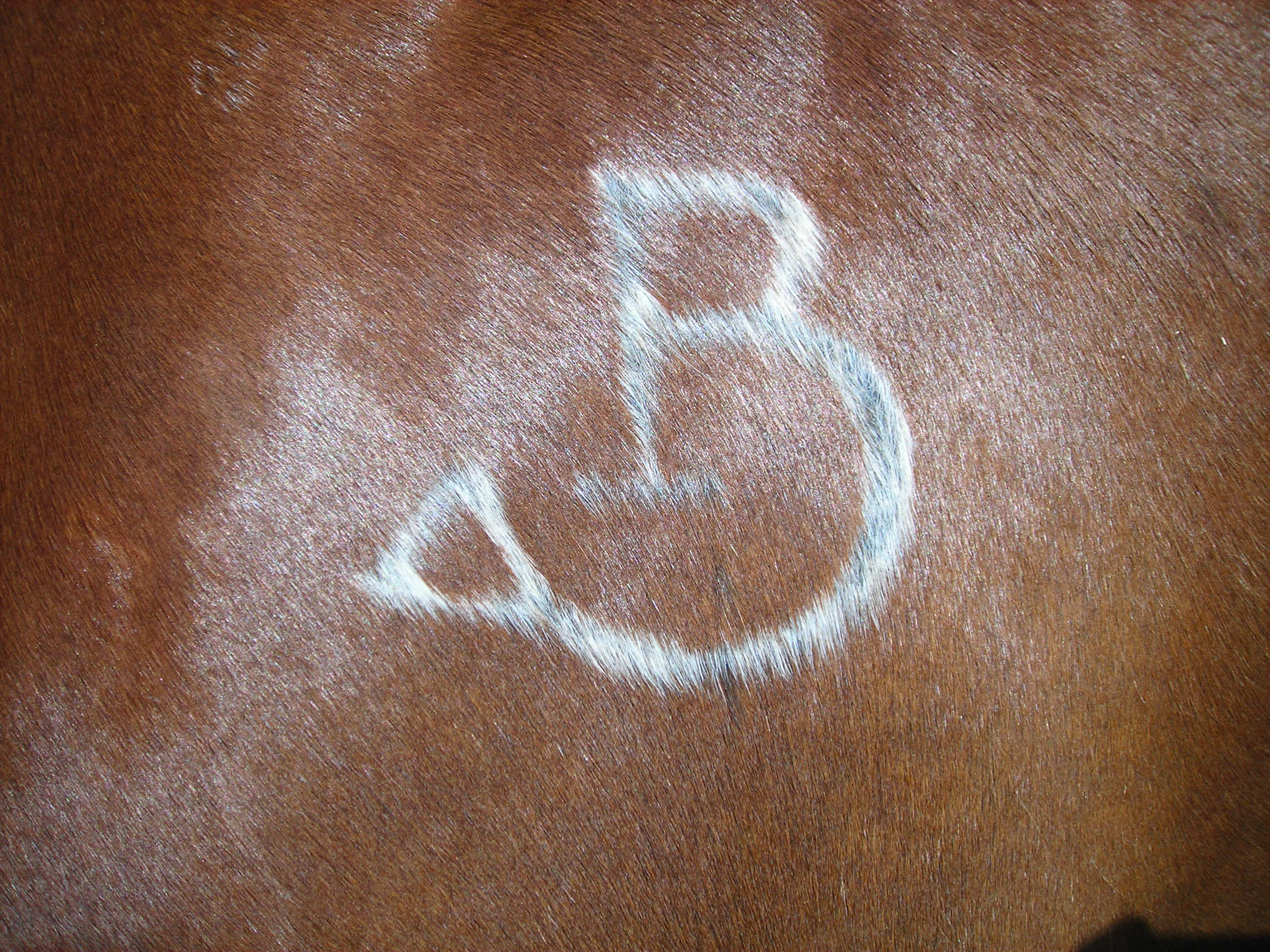
A freeze brand

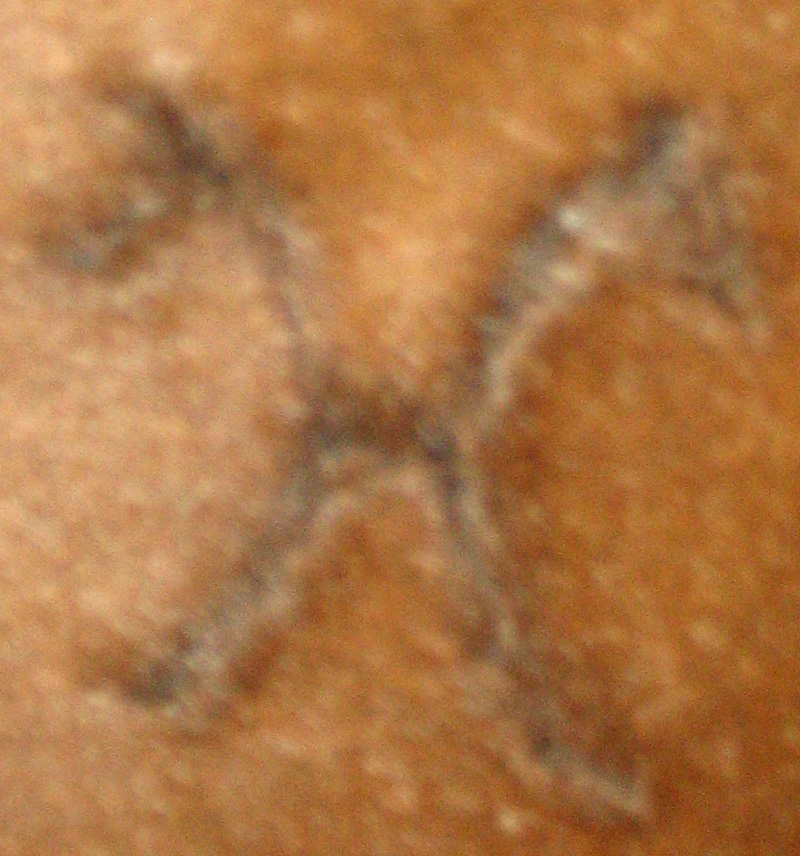
A hot brand

== Other identifying features ==
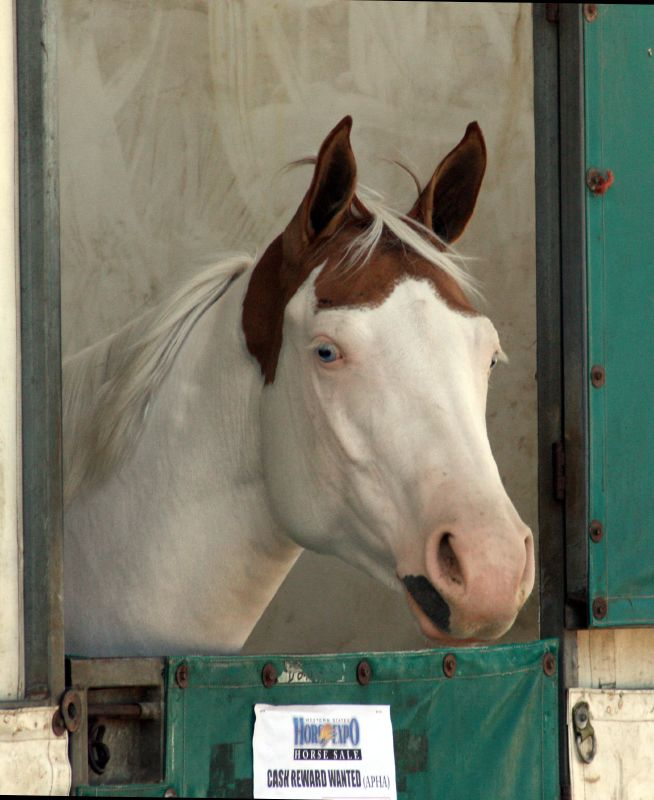
A tovero horse with blue eyes, a "Medicine hat", and a lip spot

Horses can be uniquely identified by more than just markings or brands. A few other physical characteristics sometimes used to distinguish a horse from another are:

- Whorls, colloquially known as "cowlicks": divergent or convergent patches of hair found anywhere on the body but mostly on the head, neck, chest, belly, or just in front of the stifles. Included as identifying marks for documentation when unusual, such as double whorl on forehead or whorl on the side of the neck.
- "Glass" eye, "Moon" eye, "China" eye, "Wall" eye or "Night" eye: A blue eye. Horses with blue eyes are less common than horses with brown eyes, but can see equally well. An eye can also be partially blue.
- Chestnuts: A callous-like area on the inside of the horse's leg that has a subtle pattern, but one unique to each horse. It has been proposed that chestnuts could be used as a type of "fingerprint" to identify a horse, but the idea has failed to become widespread in practice, probably in part because the chestnut continually grows and sheds, making precise measurement a challenge.

== Coat colors with distinctive patterns ==
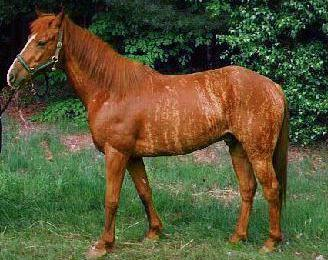
A brindle chestnut

Some horse coat colors are distinguished by unique patterns. However, even for horses with coat colors that are arranged in a manner unique to each individual horse, these patterns are not called "markings." Some coat colors partially distinguished by unique patterning include:

- Bay: A horse coat color that features black point coloration on a red base coat. All bay horses have a black mane, tail and legs (except where overlain by white markings), caused by the presence of the agouti gene. Most have black hairs along the edges of their ears and on their muzzles, and occasionally will have a slight darkening of the hairs along their backbone.
- Brindle: An extremely rare horse coat pattern; it typically features faint vertical striping in a shade slightly diluted from the base coat color. Brindling may be associated with chimerism.
- Dun: A horse coat color that features primitive markings: a slightly darker hair shade from the base coat located in a dorsal stripe along the horse's backbone, horizontal striping on the upper legs and sometimes transverse striping across the shoulders. These markings identify a horse as a dun as opposed to a buckskin or a bay.
- Leopard complex: Responsible for a variety of patterns, typically leopard-type spotting, and is most closely identified with the Appaloosa breed.
- Pinto: A horse coat color that is distinguished by one of several possible broad spotting patterns, as opposed to the smaller spots typical of the Appaloosa. Variations include Piebald, Skewbald, Overo, Tobiano, Tovero and Sabino.
- Roan: A horse coat color that features white and dark hairs intermingled together, but the horse has head and legs of the base color with very little white. Roans sometimes have dark areas on their coats similar to Bend-Or spots, called "corn marks".
