= Sabino horse =

Color pattern in horses

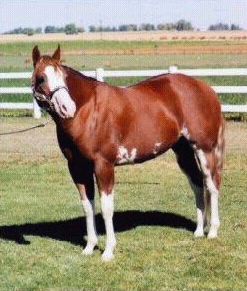
A horse with classic sabino belly spots, white above its knees and hocks, a white chin and wide white facial markings.

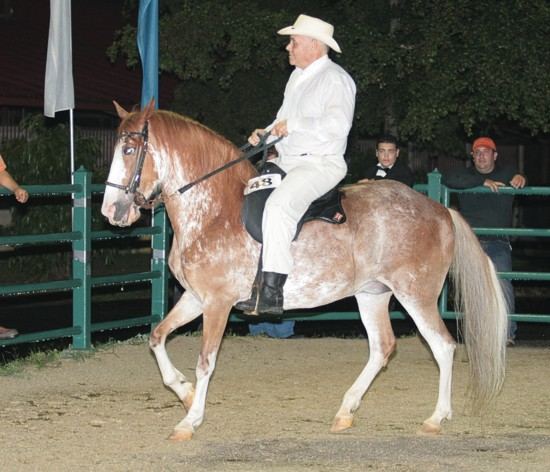
A sabino horse with extensive roaning

Sabino describes a distinct pattern of white spotting in horses. In general, Sabino patterning is visually recognized by roaning or irregular edges of white markings, belly spots, white extending past the eyes or onto the chin, white above the knees or hocks, and "splash" or "lacy" marks anywhere on the body. Some sabinos have patches of roan patterning on part of the body, especially the barrel and flanks. Some sabinos may have a dark leg or two, but many have four white legs. Sabino patterns may range from slightly bold face or leg white markings—as little as white on the chin or lower lip—to horses that are fully white.

The known causes of the sabino patterns are the SB-1 allele and several other dominant white (W) alleles on the KIT gene. The genetics behind some types of sabino, such as that found in Clydesdales, have not yet been identified. Some genes, such as Sabino-1, are incomplete dominants, producing irregular spotting when heterozygous, but when homozygous, can produce a horse that is almost completely white. Some forms of sabino are thought to be a reason for solid-colored horses with bold white markings on the face and high white leg markings.

Prior to the development and widespread use of DNA testing to determine equine coat color, the term broadly encompassed pinto patterns that did not clearly appear to be tobiano or frame overo. Some breed registries still use the term to describe spotting phenotypes that include roaning or irregular spotting, regardless of the precise genetics involved.

== Description ==
Horses described as Sabino can have varying amounts of white, from bold white face and leg markings all the way up to fully white coats. Sabino patterns often have speckling and roaning. The different white spotting patterns usually have some consistency in which areas of the horse are white and which are pigmented. At the minimal end, there will typically be white on the legs and face, and the horse may also be lightly roaned. In horses with a bit more white, it usually extends above the knees and hocks onto the belly. At the other end of the spectrum, nearly white sabino horses may still have scattered flecks of color, though it is also fairly common to have color on the ears, lower neck and chest, flanks, tailhead, and back.

Unlike white markings on non-sabino horses, the white leg markings of the sabino pattern often have a strip of white extending up the front or the back of the legs toward the belly. Some people call these "lightning strikes".

== Terminology ==
The term "sabino" was in use prior to the mapping of the horse genome to describe a wide range of pinto spotting patterns that are characterized by irregular edges, and is used by some breed registries. For example, the American Paint Horse Association still groups sabino patterns in its "overo" family of color patterns, even though sabino, splashed white, and frame overo are produced by different genetic mechanisms and are visually distinct. Since the APHA classification system was created prior to modern genetic studies, it was based on physical description and not genetics.

In Welsh ponies and some other UK breeds, sabino patterns are sometimes called "blagdon." To confuse matters further, in Spanish-speaking countries, the term "overo" refers to horses with what are called "sabino" patterns in English; meanwhile, in these countries the term "sabino", which literally translated from Spanish means "speckled" or sometimes "roan", refers to a flea-bitten gray.

Breed standards that recognize the sabino pattern include the Mustang, American Paint, Miniature horse, Morgan, Hackney (and Hackney pony), Tennessee Walking Horse, and the pinto color breed registries. Horse breeds that are generally solid-colored and do not allow most pinto coloring in their breed registries, but who may have representatives with sabino-style patterns (such as the Arabian, Thoroughbred, and Clydesdale) have at times classified sabino horses as roan or even gray.

== Genetics ==
Most spotting patterns described as sabino are thought to be created by various mutations, most on the KIT gene, grouped broadly as dominant white (W), which now includes the SB-1 allele. DNA testing is often required to verify the specific genes influencing a pattern. There are over 30 alleles of dominant white identified to date, though only some produce sabino-like spotting. Confusing matters further, some horses may carry more than one allele that produces spotting patterns, thus visual verification of any specific genetic mechanism may be challenging. For example, some blue-eyed horses described as sabino may have a pattern created by the splashed white (SW) gene family.

Variants affecting the KIT gene are also responsible for tobiano and classic roan. KIT is also the gene associated with unpigmented patches of skin and hair on the extremities and midline of humans, mice, and pigs. KIT plays an important role in the migration of early pigment cells (melanocytes) from the neural crest to their ultimate location in the skin. Mutations on KIT appear to limit the migration of melanocytes, leaving the extremities and midline devoid of pigment cells. Other factors, including stochastic events and other genes, affect the amount of unpigmented skin and hair in the fully developed animal.

There are differences in terminology amongst genetics researchers and certain organizations that promote sabino patterns. Because several dominant white alleles produce sabino-style patterns rather than completely white horses, some propose the W gene be called the "white spotting" gene. In some cases, a horse that is homozygous for the SB-1 gene is often called "sabino-white," some researchers prefer the term "maximum sabino" rather than "sabino-white" to describe horses more than 90% white. Groups promoting sabino color have a more generous definition; the Sabino Arabian Horse Registry considers a "Maximum" Sabino to be a horse that is over 50% white.

== Sabino 1 allele ==
Sabino 1 was identified in 2005 by researchers at the University of Kentucky. The Sabino 1 allele, and the associated spotting pattern, is found in Miniature horses, American Quarter Horses, American Paint Horses, Tennessee Walkers, Missouri Fox Trotters, Mustangs, Shetland Ponies, and Aztecas. SB1 is notably absent from the Arabian horse, Thoroughbred, Standardbred horse, Shire horse and Clydesdale. Sabino 1 is an incomplete dominant trait; homozygous individuals have significantly more white than horses that are heterozygous.

Horses who are heterozygous for Sabino-1 (SB1/sb1) generally have a distinctive white spotting pattern of irregular, rough-edged white patches that usually include two or more white feet or legs, a blaze, spots or roaning on the belly or flanks, and jagged margins to white markings. Horses homozygous for the Sabino 1 allele (SB1/SB1) are "sabino-white," typically at least 90% white-coated at birth with unpigmented skin under white hair. Horses in both cases have dark eyes.

The Sabino 1 locus is at the KIT gene. The mutation responsible for Sabino 1 is a single nucleotide polymorphism designated KI16+1037A. The Sabino 1 mutation results in the skipping of exon 17. The gene in the equine wildtype is recessive (sb1) and the SB1 mutation is dominant, though an sb1/sb1 horse may have white markings due to other factors. Modest Sabino 1 markings can be difficult to tell apart from other white markings; the phenotypes overlap. Sabino 1 and the other KIT alleles in horses are not known to cause blue eyes. Blue eyes are linked to splashed white genes, and green-blue eyes are seen in horses with two dilution genes.

Researchers named the allele "Sabino 1" with the expectation that later alleles would be named "Sabino 2", "Sabino 3", and so on. However, based on mouse nomenclature, it would have been more consistent to label the SB-1 gene as a W allele as it was part of the dominant white allelic series. The decision to name it "sabino" was to match the existing nomenclature used by horse breeders and to avoid confusion with various controversial known-lethal white genes in horses. However, confusion occurred anyway as more alleles at the same locus were discovered and the subsequent mutations labeled W to match the symbol used in mouse research.

Neither Sabino 1 or any other alleles of W are linked to lethal white syndrome (LWS). LWS occurs when a foal is homozygous for frame overo, which is a mutation on a different gene, EDNRB. Some of the genes in the W allelic series are embryonic lethal when homozygous and only one copy was needed for a horse to be fully white, while others, including SB-1, produced sabino patterns when heterozygous and appear to be viable when homozygous.

== "Sabino" but not Sabino 1 ==
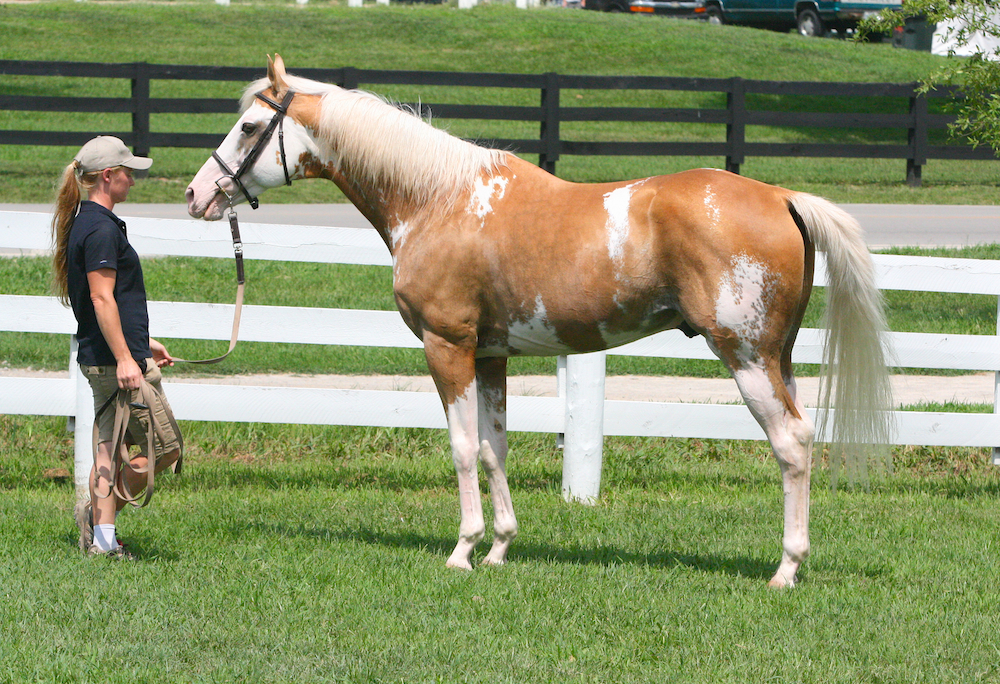
A Thoroughbred horse that carries the W5 allele and has sabino patterning

The term "sabino" is also used for horses who do not carry SB-1, but have white leg markings above the knees and hocks with jagged margins, wide blazes, and belly spots or roaning. In some cases, the term is defined even more broadly, to include white spots on the lower lip or chin, distal white patches on the legs, or "pointy" leg markings. The "dominant white" alleles W5, W8, W10, W15, and W19 are particularly noted for producing sabino-type markings.

Prior to the mapping of the horse genome and the widespread use DNA testing to verify parentage, assorted rules were created by to distinguish "spotted" from "non-spotted" horses; some breeds selected for bold white patterns, others disqualified horses with "too much white" from registration. The rules were not based on modern genetic studies, as such information was not yet available. In many cases, horses with sabino patterns fell into the middle—what was "excessive" white for one registry might be allowable in another. When early parentage testing using blood typing developed, revealing the variability of white patterns and markings, rules were modified to allow "cropouts" with extra white to be registered when previously excluded, and likewise, various color breed registries began to allow visually solid-colored foals to be registered.

Today, most breed registries allow DNA-verified offspring of registered animals to be registered regardless of color pattern, though some are slow to catch up to modern understanding of genetics. Yet others have refined their breeding goals to include or exclude horses based upon DNA color testing.

The genetics behind white patterns and markings in horses are complex. Two full siblings with the same genotype for a particular white spotting pattern may phenotypically be considered "solid" or "spotted", depending on the amount of patterning that is visible. Furthermore, the amount of white that a foal ends up with does not solely depend on known white spotting genes. For example, research suggests that chestnuts express more white than non-chestnuts.

Research indicates that there are many genes, and different alleles on those genes, that produce so-called "normal" white markings. Complicating matters further, when multiple, different alleles for white patterns are present, they have an additive effect, producing more white together than any single allele would do alone. A similar effect is observed in pinto horses with both the tobiano and frame overo pattern; these "toveros" often have more white than either tobiano or frame overo-patterned horses. Similarly, two apparently solid-colored horses with separate factors for white markings may produce a foal expressing both, with more white than either parent.

=== In Arabians ===
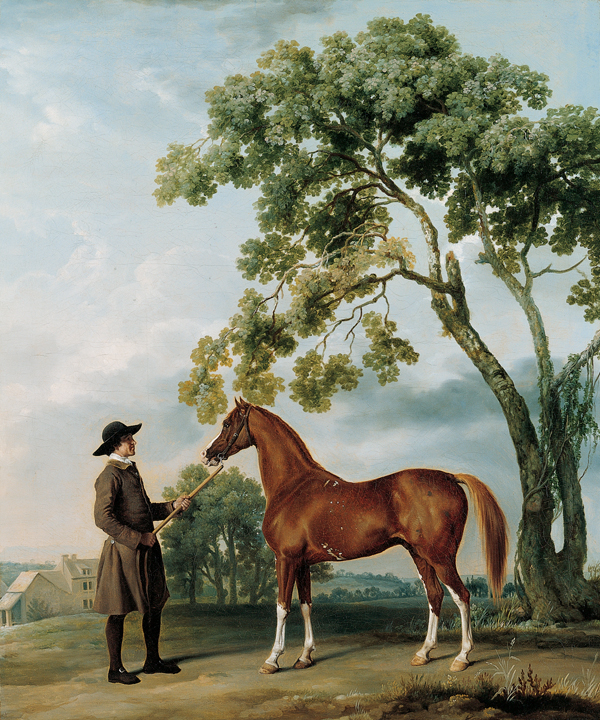
Sabino patterns have long existed in Arabians

It was long known that sabino-type white patterns existed in purebred Arabians, but neither the tobiano nor frame overo genes existed in the breed. Thus, prior to the use of parentage testing as a registration requirement, white spotting in Arabians was controversial and viewed as evidence of crossbreeding or "impure" breeding, with such horses discouraged from registry and penalized in competition. Once DNA testing began to verify parentage, a significant number of Arabians met the definition of having minimal to moderately expressed sabino characteristics, though the genetic mechanisms involved were not understood. Thus term sabino came into vogue to describe any type of bold markings or body spotting, with "minimum" sabino describing horses with slightly bold markings, and "maximum sabino" describing spotted Arabians that were close to 50% white.

In 2007, a white horse born from solid-colored parents, originally identified as "bay sabino" was determined to carry an original mutation of a previously undiscovered form of dominant white, labeled W3, and has passed this trait on to his descendants. Further research identified alleles that created "sabino" patterns in Arabians, each alleles of W, labeled W15 and W19. Studies at the University of California, Davis indicated that the none of the alleles involved in Arabians were SB1.

=== In draft horses ===
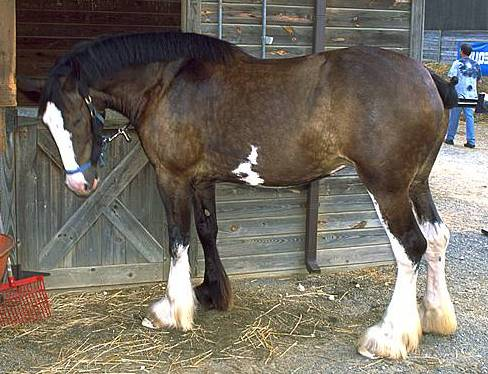
A Clydesdale horse with sabino belly spots and leg markings

The Clydesdale and Shire are closely related draft horses originally bred in the United Kingdom. Apart from massive build and copious feathering, both breeds are known for consistent white markings. The most popular and acceptable form of white markings on both breeds includes a bold blaze and four even socks. These markings are often described as sabino. In particular, white facial markings often extend to the chin or lip, and may wrap around the head with irregular, feathery borders. When white markings on the forelegs extend above the knees, they may trail up the shoulder or up the back of the leg to the elbow with irregular, feathered, or roaned borders. White markings above the hocks on the hindlegs are common, and typically trail up the front of the leg to the stifle joint and flank. Extensive white leg markings are often accompanied by body spotting, typically on the belly. These markings are also often accompanied by interspersed white hairs that give the horse a roan-like pattern. Such horses are called "roan" by the Shire and Clydesdale breed registries.

The high white markings characteristic of these two breeds follow a pattern similar to that found in Sabino 1, which led researchers to include these horses in the original study that discovered SB1. However, none of the draft-type sabinos possessed the SB1 allele. Later, the W20 allele was identified in Clydesdales, but there has been very little research done on draft breeds.

Breed standards for Clydesdale horses no longer state that "excessive white" is a fault. Conversely, even in modern times, the Shire horse breed standard counts excessive white, body spotting, or roaning as a fault, especially in stallions.

This pattern, informally labeled "draft-type sabino," appears to be dominantly inherited, but it does not result in a sabino-white phenotype when homozygous. As the gene pool for these two breeds is limited, most registered animals most likely possess the gene responsible for their white spotting pattern. Thus, if the draft-type sabino gene produced sabino-whites, near-white coats would be expected in nearly a quarter of foals, but they do not occur. Though occasional near-white Shires and Clydesdales can be found, they are quite uncommon.

=== In Thoroughbreds, American Quarter Horses and Paints ===
Historically, Thoroughbreds with irregular spotting patterns have been documented, some in photographs. Examples include The Tetrarch, Birdcatcher, and others. In modern times, multiple alleles of W have been identified in Thoroughbreds. While some alleles produce mostly white or near-white horses, those that produce sabino-style spotting include W5, W20, W22, and W27. While white coats and spotting was not considered "fashionable" in Thoroughbreds and generally selected against by breeders, nor were the colors recognized by the Jockey Club, spotted horses were sometimes recorded as "roan or gray," including Puchilingui, founding sire of the W5 line.

White patterning was originally considered undesirable by American Quarter Horse breeders, who also selected for horses that were solid-colored and minimally-marked. However, the Quarter Horse arose from multiple sources, including Thoroughbreds and other breeds now known to carry spotting genes. Among Quarter Horse breeders, foals with large amounts of white born to parents eligible for registration were referred to as cropouts," and, until 2004, "white" horses, or horses that had areas of white hair rooted in pink skin above the gaskin on the hindleg, above the halfway point between the knee and elbow in the foreleg, or beyond the eye could not be registered. However, spotting patterns were clearly in the genepool, and because of the large number of horses that had these patterns (as well as a significant number of double dilute creams also caught up by this rule), the American Paint Horse Association (APHA) formed, allowing horses of verifiable Quarter Horse or Thoroughbred ancestry to be registered as "Paints". The APHA recognizes sabino in their "overo" family of color patterns.

Since the relaxation of the "white rule," at least one registered Quarter Horse has tested homozygous for the SB1 allele. In addition, several other alleles that produce sabino-type patterns have been found in Quarter horses, including all six SW alleles, and the W spotting alleles W10, W13, W20, and W31. W32 has separately been identified in Paints.

== Combination patterns and mimics ==
Not all white horses are sabino-white or even dominant white. Combinations of other white spotting patterns, such as tobiano with heterozygous frame overo, can produce a horse that is 90% white or more. Cremello horses are superficially similar to sabino-whites, however, cremellos have blue eyes, rosy-pink skin, and a cream-colored rather than a white coat. "Fewspot" Appaloosas are nearly all white, but carry the Lp gene. Gray horses have a white hair coat at maturity but unless they also happen to carry dilution or white spotting genes, they do not have pink skin and are not white at birth.

In some cases, horses with high white stockings and bold face markings often labeled sabino carry a splashed white allele, notably SW-1, SW-2 and SW-3.

=== Pinto combinations ===
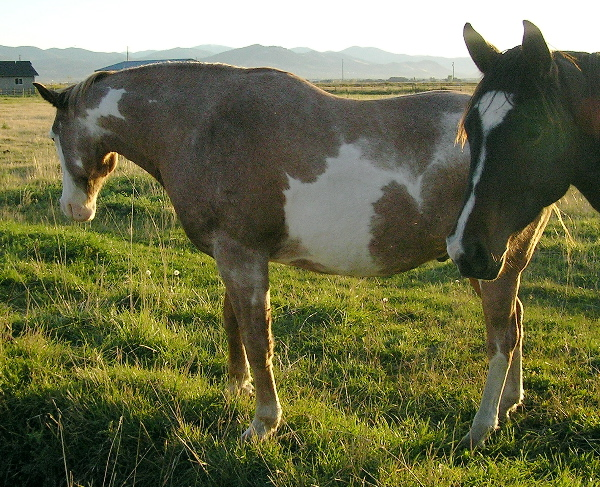
The horse on the left most likely carries multiple spotting alleles. The horizontally oriented white patches on the body of the horse are indicative of the frame pattern. The wrap-around blaze suggest splash white genetics are present. The irregular stockings and roaned edges of the white patches indicate sabino patterning.

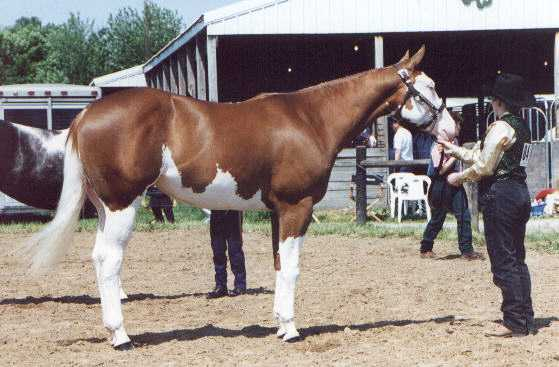
Some splashed white horses may closely resemble sabino, but tend to have more white on the head and belly, with sharper-edged white markings

Sabino patterns are produced by many different alleles, plus may bear some resemblance to other spotting patterns. Because breeders who desire pintos often crossbreed horses various color patterns, it is possible for a horse to carry genes for more than one pattern. The presence of multiple white spotting alleles often produces more white, or such horses may show characteristics of both patterns. This can, at times, make identification and registration of spotted horses a challenge. Conversely, even if a spotting gene is present, white body markings may be so minimal in some individuals that they are registered as solid-colored. However, they may produce strongly colored offspring.

The frame pattern, one of the first spotting patterns to have a DNA test developed, is produced by the Ile118Lys mutation on the equine Endothelin receptor type B gene and when homozygous produces lethal white syndrome. Frame is characterized by jagged but sharply defined, horizontally oriented white patches. By itself, the frame pattern does not produce white markings that cross the back, or affect the legs or tail. The expression of the frame pattern varies from minor white markings to the distinctive framed pattern.

Horses carrying both frame and sabino genes can be expected to show characteristics of both patterns. While frame alone is seldom responsible for white leg markings, a frame-sabino blend might have frame body markings and white markings on the legs. Similarly, while frame alone usually produces markings with jagged but sharply defined white patches, the addition of sabino can add roaned edges and roaning on the body.

Splash, or splashed white, is characterized by blue eyes and crisp, smooth markings. The legs, tail, underside and head are typically white; the white head is distinct in that most of the head is white. The most minimal splashes may have only a bottom-heavy, off-center snip and low hind socks.

Blue eyes are not considered a sabino characteristic, but splashed white-sabino blends may have a lot of facial white and even blue eyes. Splash-sabino blends may have characteristics of both patterns, such as jagged patches, roaning, blue eyes and blocky white markings. Splash in conjunction with sabino may also produce the "medicine hat" pattern, where only the ears and poll and sometimes the topline or chest have pigment.

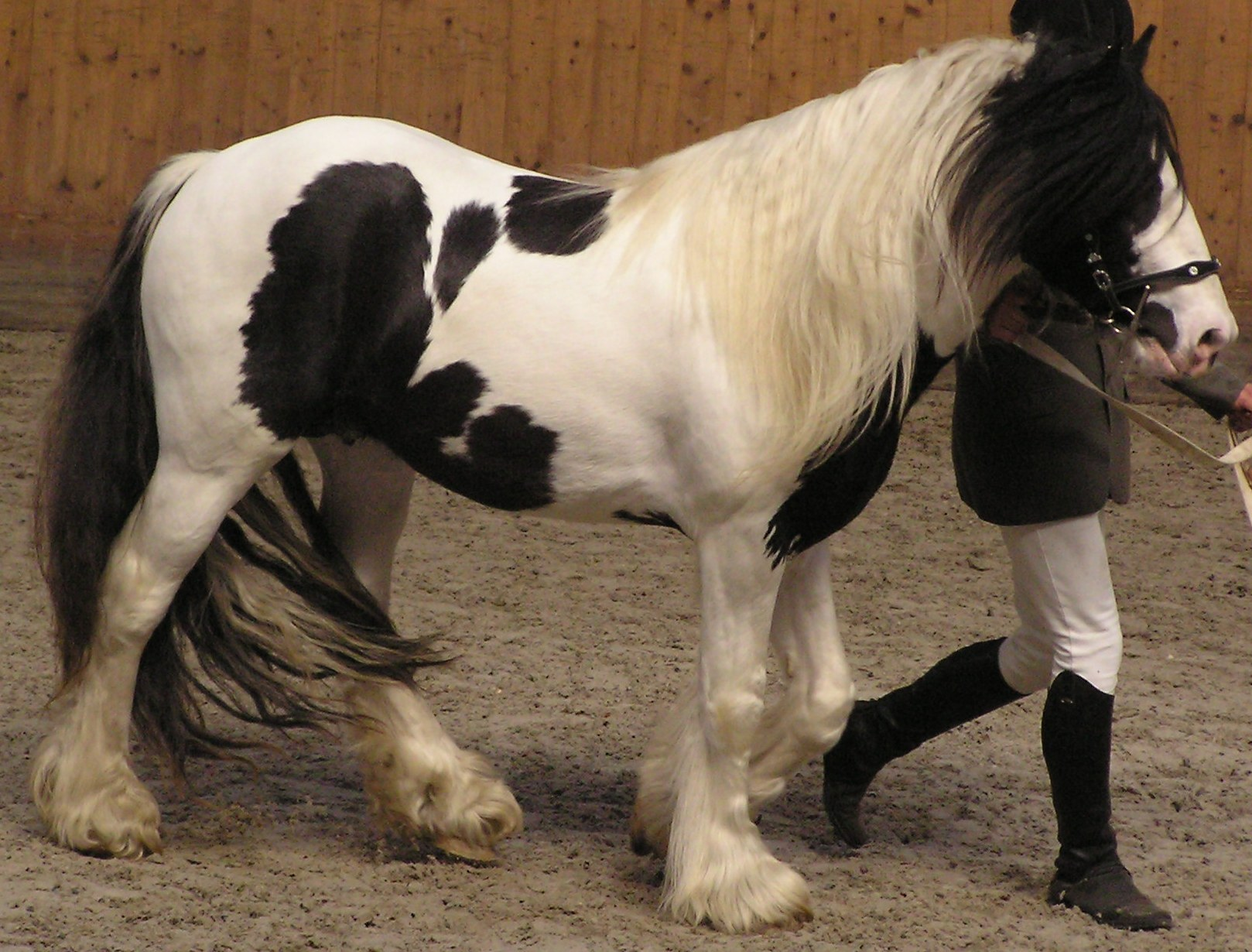
This tobiano has an irregular, wrap-around blaze and chin white, the tobiano markings have ragged edges, extend high on the legs, and some roaning is visible. Thus, this horse may carry sabino or splash genetics as well as tobiano.

The tobiano pattern is easily recognizable, genetically distinct, and tobiano horses are categorized separately from other patterns in breeding associations for pinto-spotted horses. The simple dominant allele responsible for the tobiano pattern (TO) is a large inversion approximately 100kb downstream of KIT and is expected to impact KIT protein function. The tobiano pattern is characterized by smooth, crisp-edged white markings arranged in a vertical orientation that often cross the back. The head is usually dark with some markings, but the legs are often white, and the tail is often white or partly white. A tobiano-sabino blend might then have more than the expected amount of facial white markings, blotchy or roaned edges to tobiano markings, or white on the stifle and flanks.

=== Roan and rabicano ===
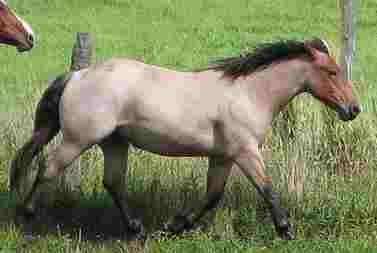
This true or "classic" roan has the characteristic darker head and legs.

A true roan is neither sabino nor gray, but instead refers to a pattern of evenly-interspersed white hairs on the body with minimal white hairs on the head and legs and few, if any white markings. In contrast, primary characteristics of sabino include bold white markings on the head and legs, often with roaning at the edges. When both roan and sabino are present in the same horse, it can be difficult to tell whether the roaning is due to sabino or true roan, especially if the white markings entirely cover up the telltale dark head and legs.

In some breed registries, the term "roan" is used to record sabinos, particularly with Thoroughbreds and Arabians. Sabinos have also been described as "roan" by Clydesdale, Shire, and Tennessee Walking Horse registries.

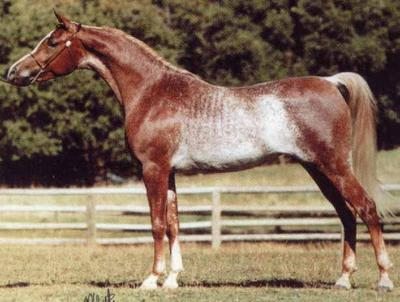
The extensive roaning or ticking of this horse's barrel is typical of the rabicano pattern, which is sometimes confused with sabino. High white markings and patches are not controlled by rabicano.

Rabicano is another type of "roaning" or ticking characterized by scattered white hairs centered on the flanks, barrel and white hairs at the base of the tail. It is unknown if the roaning characteristic of some sabino-type patterns is due to the additional presence of rabicano or a separate mechanism. Rabicanos are also often identified as roans, even among breeds that do not have true roans, such as Thoroughbreds and Arabians.

=== Gray and sabino ===
Gray horses undergo progressive silvering that begins at or shortly following birth. Young gray horses often exhibit a mixture of whitish and colored hairs which can be mistaken for roaning. Grays develop more and more white hairs over the course of several years, most eventually losing all or almost all of their original colored hair. Sabino markings are permanent, and while some changes are not out of the ordinary, drastic color changes are not characteristic of sabino-type patterns. If a horse carries both genes, it will show spotting patterns while young, but they will fade over time as the overall coat lightens to white. Once the horse has fully grayed, the pink skin beneath the original white markings will still exist, but may not be obvious unless the horse has a body-clipped hair coat or is wet.

== See also ==
- Equine coat color
- Equine coat color genetics
- White (horse)
- Dominant white
