= Tovero =

Horse coat coloration

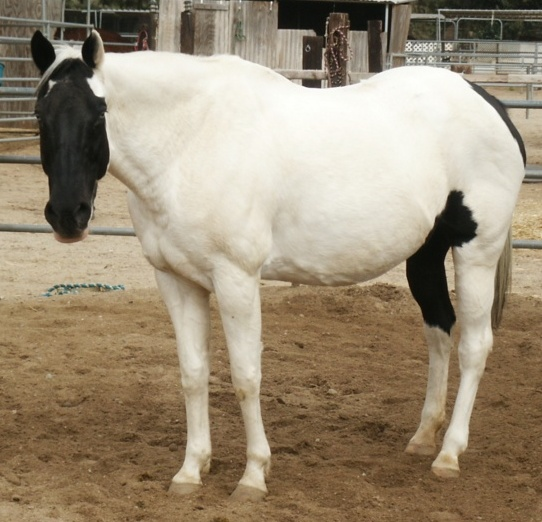
A Tovero colored mare with two blue eyes and a black "shield" on her face.

The Tovero (also known as Tobero) coloration is a mix of tobiano and overo colorations in Pinto horses and American Paint Horses. The genetics of pinto coloration are not always fully understood, and some horses have a combination of patterns that does not fit cleanly in either category.

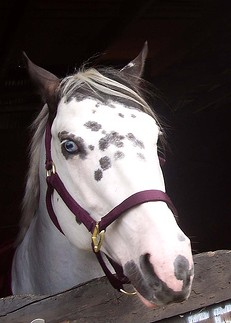
A tovero horse with blue eyes and "Medicine hat" markings.

Some characteristics of a Tovero colored horse include:

- Dark pigmentation around the ears, sometimes called a "Medicine Hat" or a "War bonnet"
- Dark pigmentation around the ears, expanding to cover the forehead and/or eyes.
- Isolated "shield" dark markings completely surrounded by white, particularly on the face or chest.
- One or both eyes blue.
- Dark pigmentation around the mouth, which may extend up the sides of the face and form spots.
- Chest spot(s) in varying sizes. These may also extend up the neck.
- Flank spot(s) ranging in size. These are often accompanied by smaller spots that extend forward across the barrel, and up over the loin.
- Spots, varying in size, at the base of the tail.

== See also ==
- Pinto horse
- American Paint Horse
- Equine coat color
