= Tobiano =

Spotted color pattern in horses

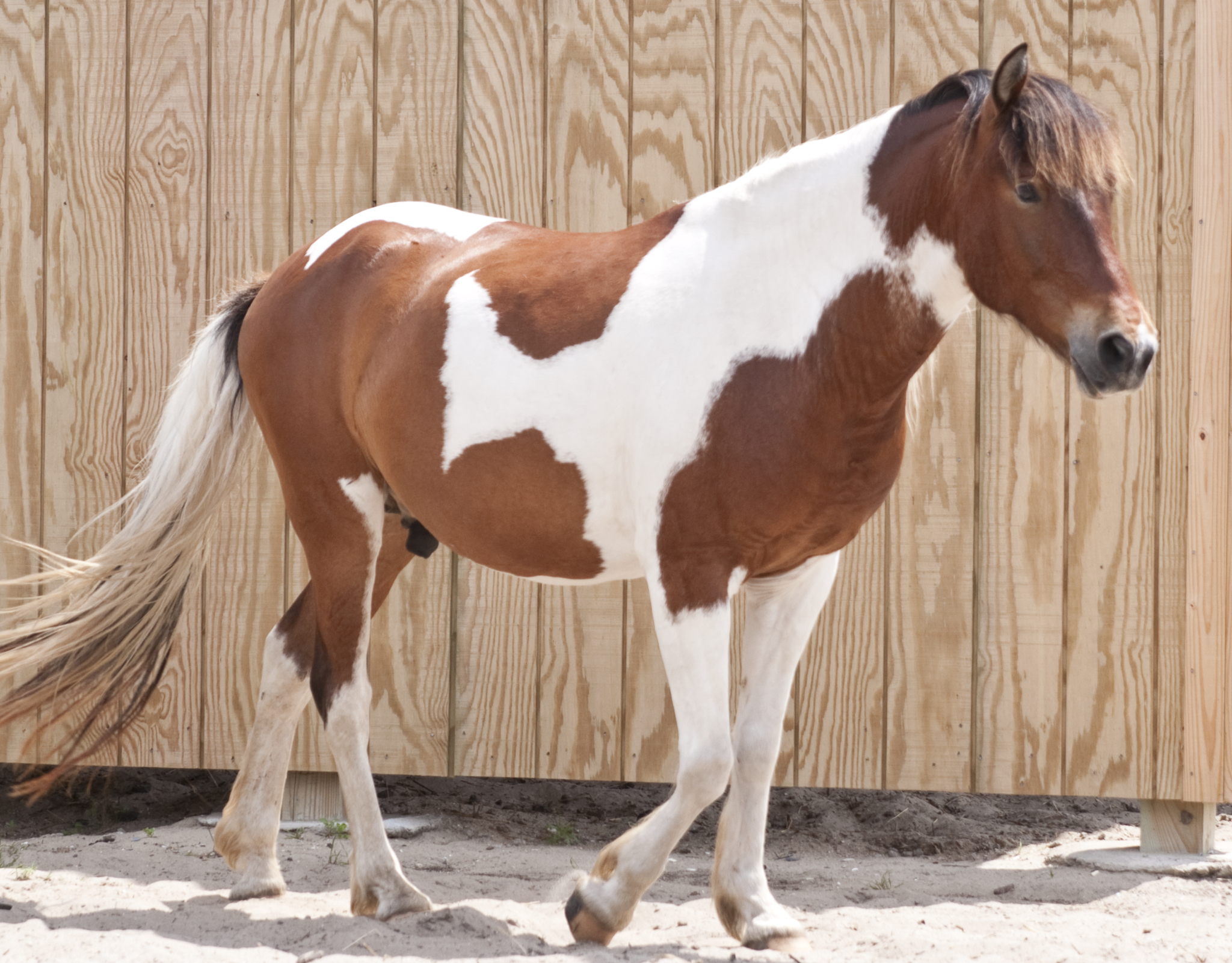
A bay-and-white, or skewbald, tobiano-patterned horse

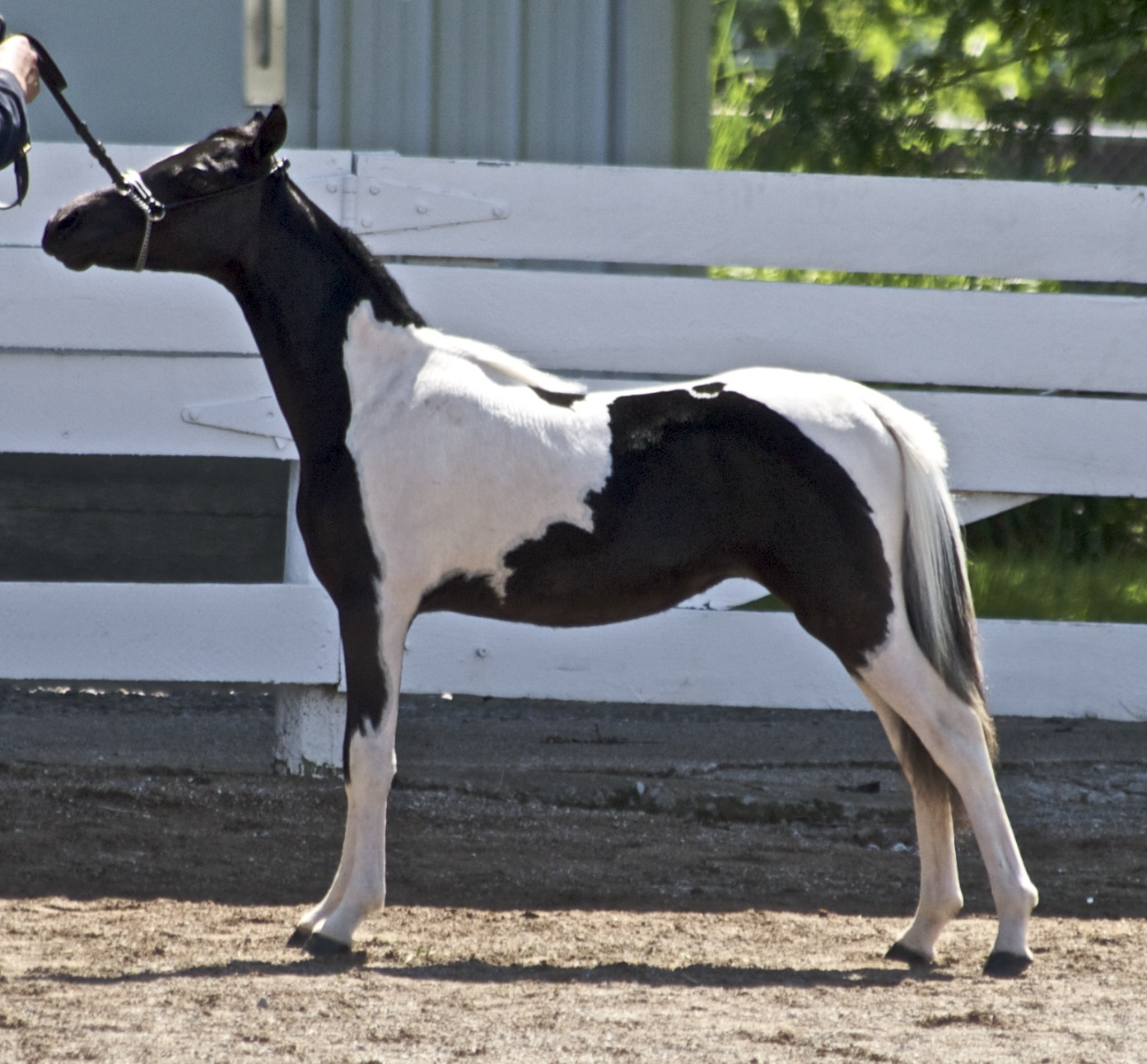
A black-and-white, or piebald, tobiano-patterned miniature horse

Tobiano horses

Tobiano is a spotted color pattern commonly seen in pinto horses, produced by a dominant gene. The tobiano gene produces white-haired, pink-skinned patches on a base coat color. The coloration is almost always present from birth and does not change throughout the horse's lifetime, unless the horse also carries the gray gene. It is a dominant gene, so any tobiano horse must have at least one parent who carries the tobiano gene.

Other spotting patterns seen in pinto horses include frame overo, splashed white and sabino. In the United Kingdom, tobianos are frequently referred to as "coloured" or as "pied": piebald if black and white, skewbald if white and any base color other than black. Sometimes "painted" is also used. Bay and white tobiano horses are also referred to as tricoloured.

== Characteristics ==
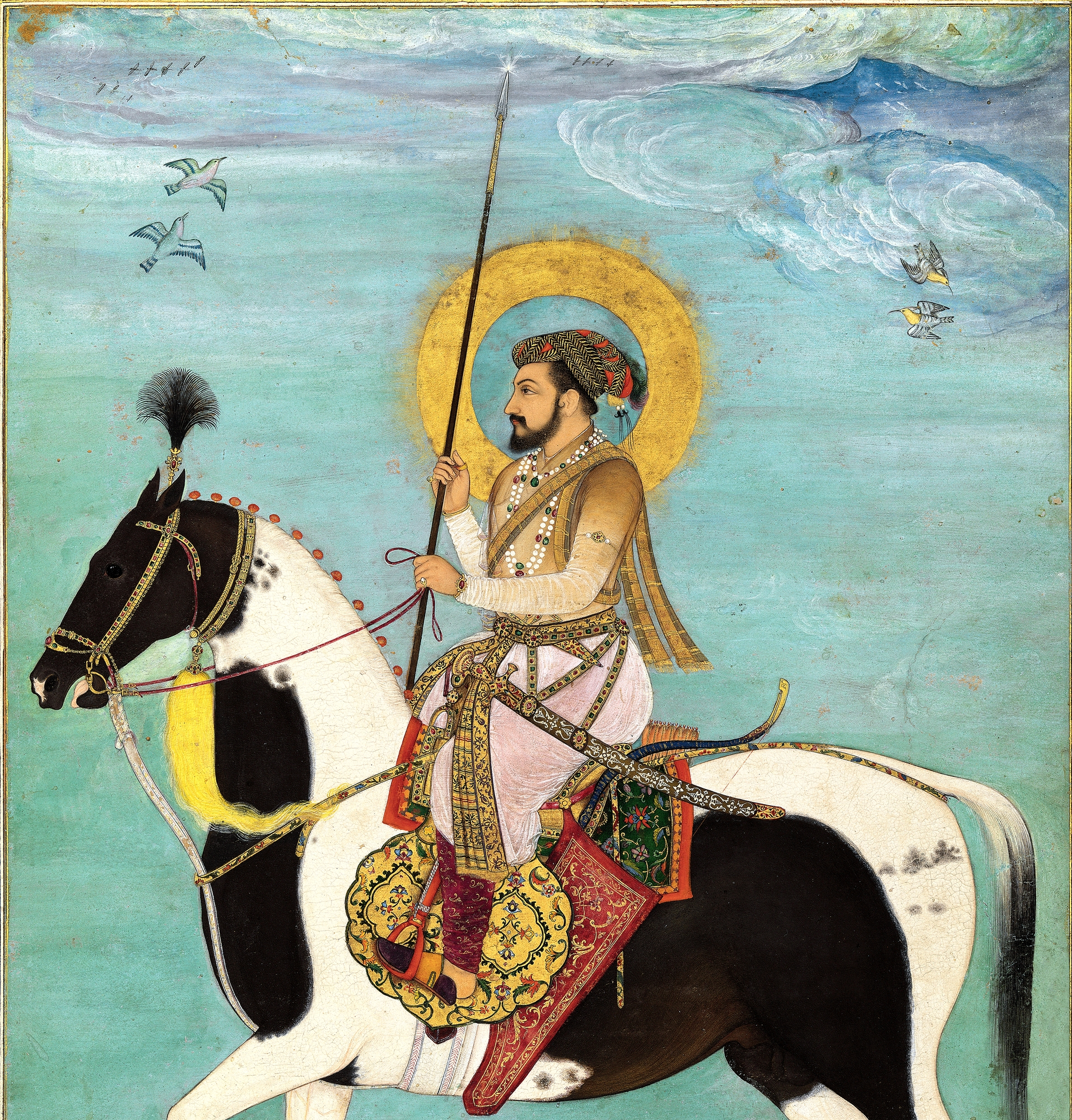
Shah Jahan on a piebald tobiano.

Tobiano traits generally include the following:

- White legs from the hocks and knees down
- White crossing the back between the withers and the dock of the tail
- White is arranged in a vertical pattern
- Facial markings are similar to those of a traditionally solid-colored horse. i.e. star, snip, strip, or blaze. Extreme white facial markings suggest the presence of additional color pattern genes beyond tobiano
- White patches which are usually rounded or oval in shape, rather than jagged (see overo)
- Dark color extending down the neck, giving the appearance of a shield

The word tobiano is of Portuguese origin, first used in Brazil to describe horses brought to Farroupilha's War by Brigadeiro Rafael Tobias de Aguiar. (HOUAISS, A. VILLAR, M. de S. Dicionário Houaiss da Língua Portuguesa. Rio de Janeiro: Objetiva, 2001. p. 2727).

== Genetics ==
Tobiano is a dominant gene, designated TO. Therefore, one parent must be a tobiano for the pattern to occur, and the coat pattern will occur with a single copy of the tobiano gene present (i.e. the horse is heterozygous for tobiano). Furthermore, when a horse is homozygous for tobiano coloring, all of that horse's offspring will be spotted, with only a few exceptions: if either parent passes the dominant gray gene to the foal, then its spots will be visible while it is young, but will gradually become lighter until finally, as the gray gene acts upon all coat colors, the entire horse's coat fades. In the case of horses that are born tobiano but turn gray, the skin will retain pigmented and unpigmented skin beneath its hair that may produce "ghost" markings. A homozygous tobiano that also carries a dilution gene, such as a pinto with a base color of palomino or buckskin, may not reliably produce spotted offspring if bred to another horse with a dilution gene, as a double-dilution may "wash out" the base color.

The tobiano gene itself is not linked to lethal white syndrome. However, some tobiano horses may be carriers of the gene if they have overo ancestors, and thus have produced affected offspring when bred to another horse that is also a carrier. In some cases, a horse which carries both tobiano and overo genetics may display white markings that combine both patterns, and are referred to as toveros.

== DNA testing ==
Tobiano occurs due to a chromosomal inversion on ECA3 where the gene order of a section spanning nearly one-third of the chromosome "flipped" during a genetic recombination event. It is thought to be an ancient gene among domestic horses, about 3500 years old, and is widely distributed across many breeds in the world.

Genetic testing is available to help determine the presence of the tobiano gene. Originally, there was no direct test for tobiano; the early tobiano tests utilized six genetic markers, including a marker on the KIT gene on horse chromosome 3, which were closely linked to tobiano but could not be used to officially prove homozygosity. After some years of research from the University of Kentucky, in 2008 the chromosomal inversion that affects regulatory regions of the KIT gene was discovered. This inversion was finally mapped for genetic testing and is now offered by several laboratories. Testing is most often intended to determine homozygosity, but is also useful in cases where a horse has grayed, or if a horse has an unexplained loss of pigmentation.

== See also ==
- American Paint Horse
- Equine coat color genetics
- Equine coat color
- Overo
- Pinto horse
- Sabino horse
