= Overo =

Group of colouration patterns of horses

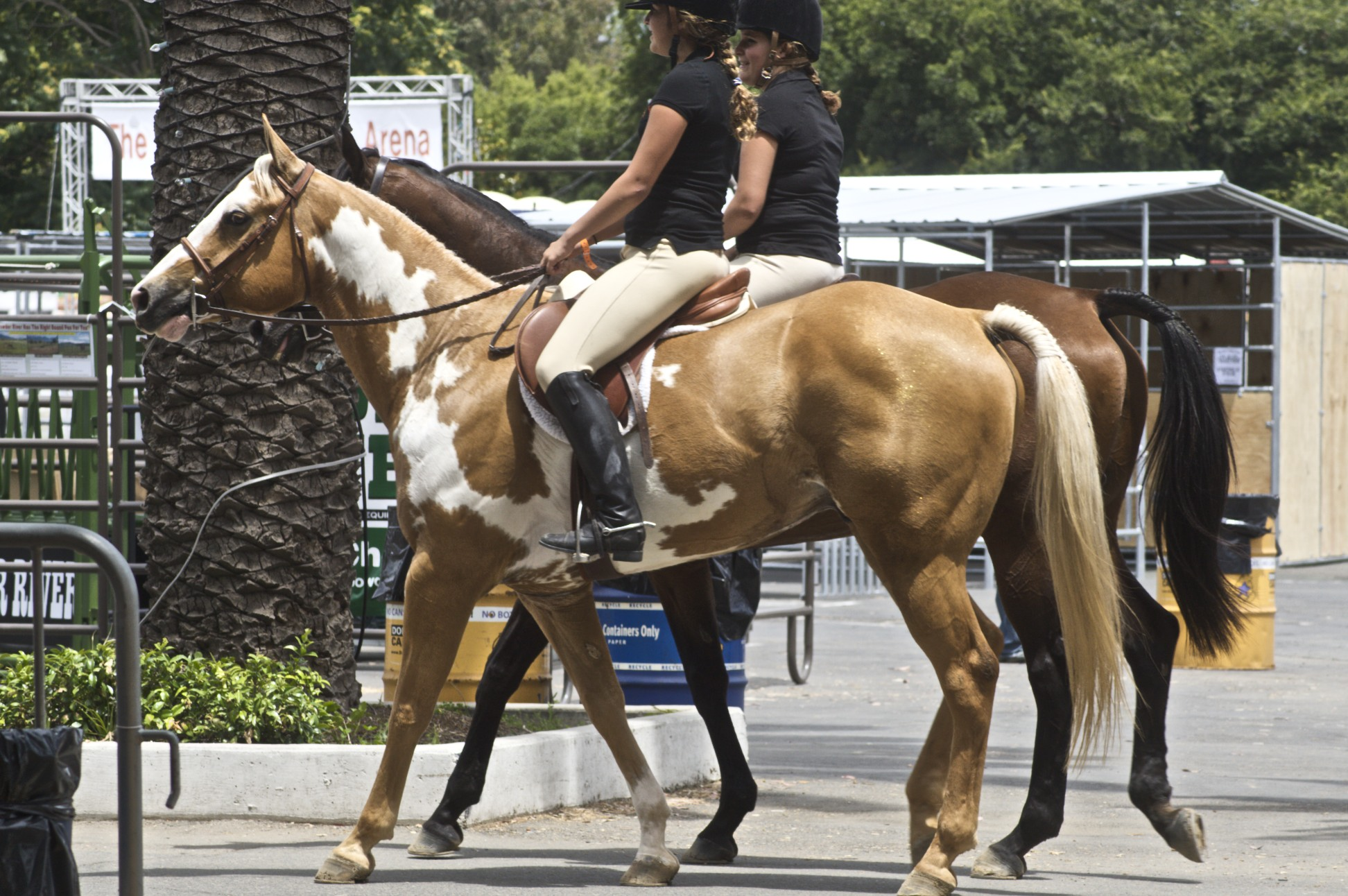
A frame overo

Overo refers to several genetically unrelated pinto coloration patterns of white-over-dark body markings in horses, and is a term used by the American Paint Horse Association to classify a set of pinto patterns that are not tobiano. Overo is a Spanish word, originally meaning "like an egg". The most common usage refers to frame overo, but splashed white and sabino are also considered "overo". A horse with both tobiano and overo patterns is called tovero.

Frame overo, splashed white, and sabino are three separate pinto patterns, genetically unrelated, that are grouped together under the name "overo".

The frame overo pattern tends to have white spots on the flanks and face, surrounded by a dark "frame" of color. If two horses with the frame overo gene are bred together, there is a 25% chance the foal will have lethal white syndrome.

Splashed white or splash overo is a group of patterns that tend to have white on the underside, as if a horse ran through white paint with its head lowered. So far 6 alleles on two genes have been discovered to cause splashed white patterns. There is a correlation between the splashed white pattern and deafness.

Sabino or sabino overo is a group of patterns that typically have white on the legs, face, and sometimes also belly, often with white ticking or roaning. Several alleles on the KIT gene are known to cause sabino or sabino-like patterns.

== Frame overo ==
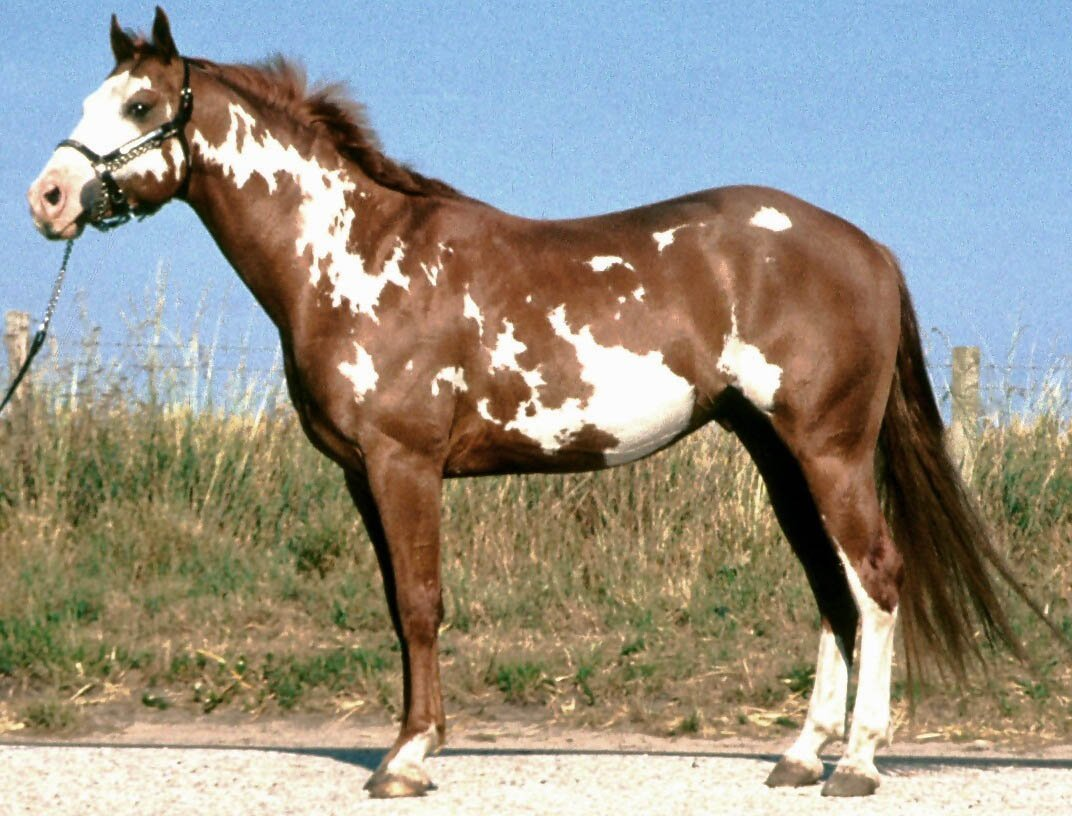
Frame overos have sharply defined, irregular, horizontally oriented white patches. As here, they are often bald-faced and white patches seldom cross the topline, creating a "frame" of non-white coat.

The frame overo pattern is the most common of the three types of overo patterns recognized in the American Paint Horse breed. A frame overo horse appears to be any solid base color (bay, black, chestnut, etc.) with white irregular patches added, usually with a horizontal orientation. Markings are often of jagged shape rather than rounded, the white rarely crosses the back, the lower legs tend to be dark, and the tail is one color, usually dark. The head is often white or bald-faced, and blue eyes are not uncommon. The frame overo pattern usually behaves like a dominant gene, in that when frame overo horses are crossed on nonspotted horses, about half of the foals come out spotted. There are records of frame overos being produced by two nonspotted parents. There is a theory, however, that these "solid" horses simply may be horses with very minimal expression of overo genetics.

Frame coloring is controversial because it is associated with lethal white syndrome (OLWS or LWS), the equine version of Hirschsprung's disease. LWS occurs when a foal is homozygous for the Ile118Lys EDNRB mutation, which is considered by many researchers to be "usually responsible" for the frame overo phenotype. However, other researchers emphasize that overo spotting patterns are phenotypically and genetically heterogeneous, that is, may have multiple sources.

The frame overo gene can be masked by other white patterns, particularly tobiano, which is a dominant gene and epistatic to overo. Epistatic means that when both genes are present, this is the one expressed.

In addition, some carriers of the LWS allele appear to be solid. One theory holds that such horses carry the frame gene, but so minimal in expression that they appear solid. Either way, all LWS foals have horses with frame overo patterning in their pedigrees, and horses carrying a frame allele may not necessarily have a visible expression of the frame overo color.

=== "Lethal white" ===
Foals which are homozygous for frame and thus have lethal white syndrome (LWS) are not albinos. Albinism does not exist in horses. LWS foals are born almost or completely white with pink skin, but have blue eyes, not red ones. The lethal trait is that the nerves of the foal's digestive system are undeveloped and the bowel cannot move food along. All lethal white foals die within 72 hours after birth, and are typically euthanized sooner for humane reasons. A horse can be a carrier of the trait when it carries only one copy of the gene, (that is, heterozygous) and carriers are healthy and show no clinical signs of lethal white syndrome.

Thus, it is recommended by organizations such as the American Paint Horse Association that horses of any pattern with overo ancestors be tested to verify their carrier state before being bred. There is a DNA test for the gene which can be used to plan breedings and avoid producing affected foals. The mutation has not been found in solid-colored horses from breeds without frame patterning. Likewise, a sick foal that happens to be white can be tested to avoid inadvertent euthanization of a non-lethal foal who has a simple case of colic.

Lethal white horses should not be confused with non-lethal forms of white, such as dominant white, which may be completely white with pink skin. Blue-eyed, pink-skinned cremellos and other horses carrying the cream gene do not carry the LWS allele unless they also have an ancestor with overo genetics. The splash white and sabino genetics are not associated with lethal white, though such horses could also be carriers of the frame allele.

== Splash overo ==
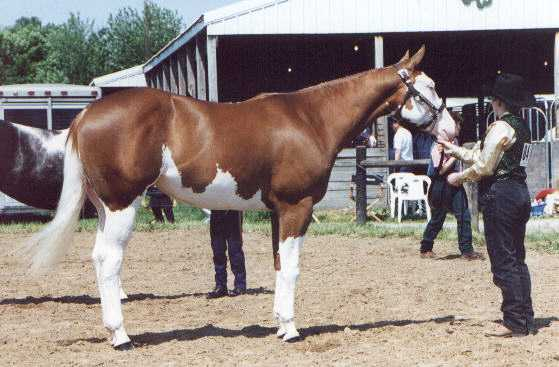
A splash overo with some minor sabino traits

A splash or splashed white overo pattern appears like a solid-colored horse who has been dipped in white paint, and the color splashed up from the bottom. It is the least common of the overo patterns. The legs and bottom portion of the body are usually white, as is the head, and blue eyes are common. Edges where white and dark color meet are usually crisp and sharp. Recent studies suggest that splashed white may be caused by a dominant gene. Splash overos are more prone to being deaf than other horses.

Outside of the United States, the term "splash" is sometimes applied to horses of apparent Sabino patterning.

== Sabino "overo" ==
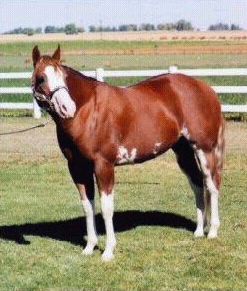
A Sabino, called "sabino overo" by some registries

Sabino is listed a type of overo coloring by the American Paint Horse Association. This terminology, outdated in terms of modern genetics, creates confusion, because other breeds, including many that will not register "pinto" or "paint" horses, may have individuals with sabino genetics. One reason for the terminology confusion is that "overo" was used by Paint horse breeders in the United States to refer to "anything that is not tobiano." Another reason for this terminology is that the term "overo", when used outside of the US, particularly in Spanish-speaking countries, refers to horses with the speckled roaning patterns typical of horses called sabino in the USA. In addition, strongly marked sabino horses may mimic either overo or tobiano coloring.

In general, sabino is a generic description for a group of similar white spotting patterns. These include high white stockings on all four feet, often extending up the legs with jagged edges, a fairly white head, with markings often extending past the eyes, roaning at the edges of white markings, lip spots, "lacing," and white patches on the lower barrel that may extend to the flanks. A minimal sabino may only have one of the traits associated with sabino horses. On the other hand, a "sabino-white" is a near-white or completely white horse, and sabino genetics are not linked to lethal white.

== Tobiano ==
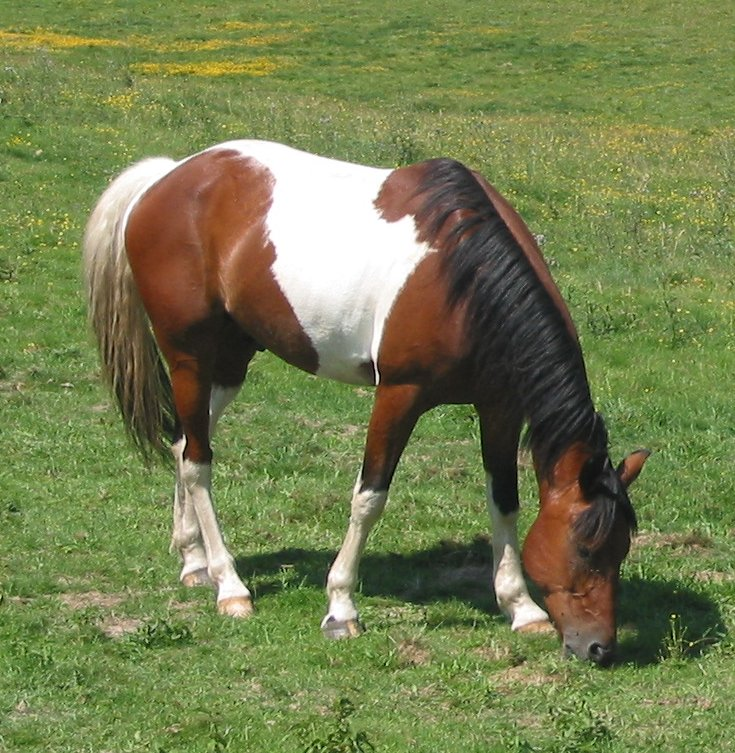
The tobiano pattern

Tobiano coloring is the inverse of overo spotting. Tobianos have a vertical spotting pattern, large, rounded spots, white that crosses the topline, dark heads, but mostly white legs and white or multi-colored tail. Typical examples tend to have more white than dark, whereas typical frame overo horses tend to more dark than white, though there are many exceptions in both cases. It is created by a different gene from any of the overo patterns and is a dominant gene. All tobianos must have at least one tobiano parent. When a tobiano allele is present, it is epistatic and often masks other patterns.

== Tovero and other mixed patterns ==
A tovero horse has pinto spotting patterns that show characteristics of both overo and tobiano and probably carries genes for both. For example, a tovero might have tobiano body spotting with rounded edges and white across the back, yet have irregular facial markings and blue eyes.

Horses may also have a combination of sabino and frame overo genetics or any other combination of genes, resulting patterns that are difficult to smoothly classify into any one group.

== Gallery ==
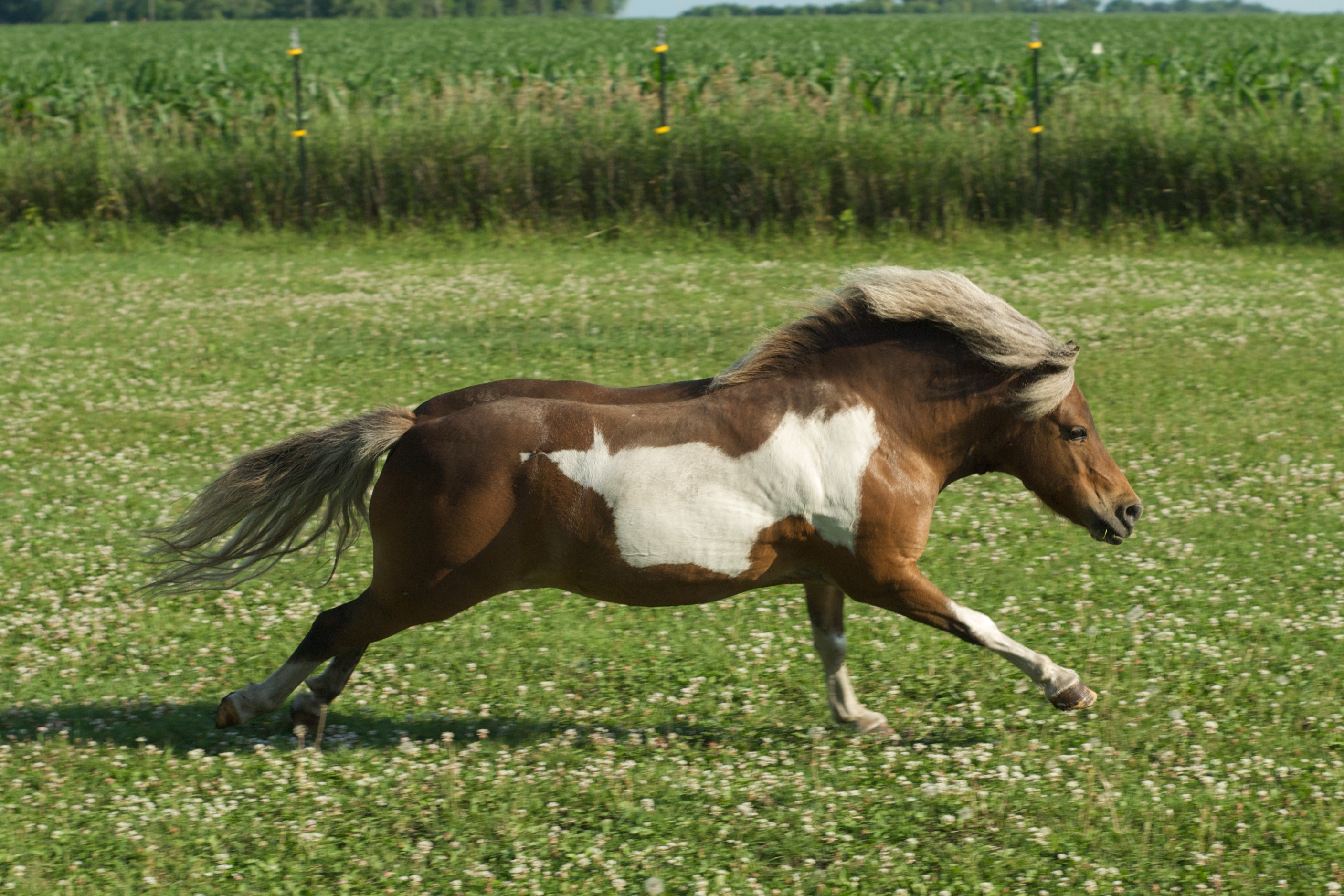
Miniature frame overo

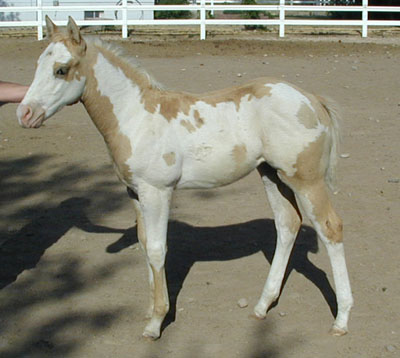
Frame overo foal

== See also ==
- Pinto horse
- American Paint Horse
- Lethal white syndrome
- Equine coat color
- Equine coat color genetics
