= Dominant white =

Horse coat color and its genetics

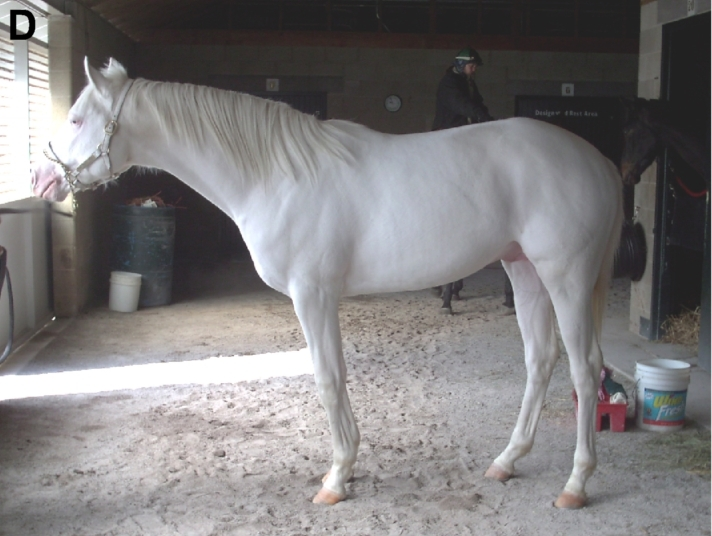
This Thoroughbred stallion (W2/+) has one form of dominant white. His skin, hooves, and pattern lack pigment cells, giving him a pink-skinned white pattern.

Dominant white (W) is a group of genetically related coat patterning alleles on the KIT gene of the horse, best known for producing what appears to be an all-white coat, but also able to produce various forms of white spotting, as well as bold white markings. Prior to the discovery of the W allelic series, many of these patterns were described by the term sabino, which is still used by some breed registries.

White spotted horses are born with unpigmented pink skin and white hair, usually with dark eyes. Under normal conditions, at least one parent must be dominant white to produce dominant white offspring. However, most of the currently-known alleles can be linked to a documented spontaneous mutation that began with a single ancestor born of non-dominant white parents. Horses that exhibit white spotting will have pink skin under the white markings, but usually have dark skin beneath any dark hair.

There are many different alleles that produce dominant white and white spotting; as of 2022 they are labeled W1 through W28 and W30 through W35, plus the first W allele discovered was named Sabino 1 (SB-1) instead of W1. They are associated with the KIT gene. The white spotting produced can range from white markings like those made by W20, to the irregularly-shaped or roaning patterns previously described as Sabino, to a fully white or almost fully white horse.

For many of the W alleles, the white spots are, as the name suggests, inherited dominantly, meaning that a horse only needs one copy of the allele to have a white spotted coat. In fact, some such alleles may be embryonic lethal when homozygous. Others, such as SB-1 and W20, are incomplete dominants, capable of producing viable offspring with two copies of the gene, and who generally have more white than horses with only one copy. In addition, different alleles which on their own give a white-spotted but not completely white horse, such as W5 and W10, can combine to make a horse completely white.

White spotting can occur in any breed, and has been studied in many different breeds. Because of the wide range of patterns produced, some suggest the family be called "white spotting" rather than "white." Other researchers suggest the term "dominant white" be used only for the W alleles thought to be embryonic lethal when homozygous.

White spotting is both genetically and visually distinct from gray and cremello. Dominant white is not the same as lethal white syndrome, nor are white horses "albinos"—Tyrosinase negative albinism has never been documented in horses.

== Description ==
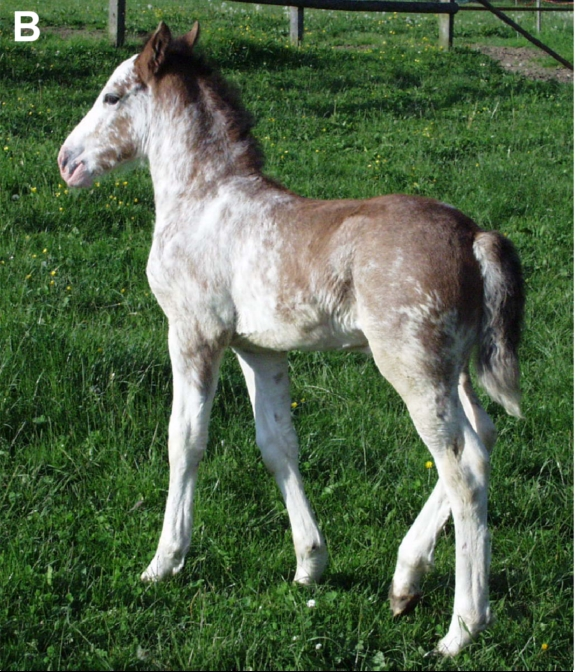
This dominant white Franches-Montagnes colt (W1/+) lost almost all his residual pigment by the time he was 3 years old (below)

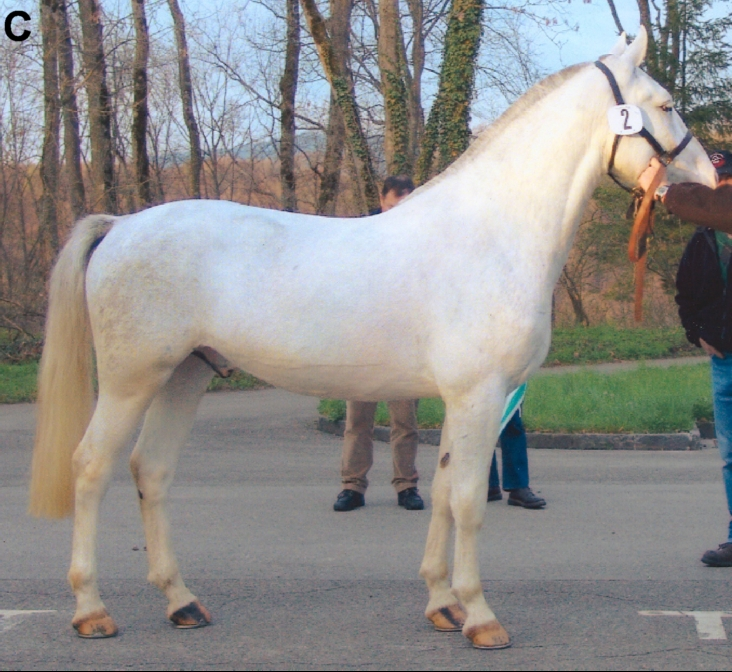
The same foal as an adult horse. Some white spotted horses lose pigment with age, even though they do not possess the gray gene. The underlying skin remains dark.

Although the term "dominant white" is typically associated with a pure white coat, such horses may be all-white, near-white, partially white, or exhibit an irregular spotting pattern similar to that of sabino horses. To add to the confusion, at least some horses in each of those groups might be referred to as "dominant white", "white spotted", or "sabino". The amount of white hair depends on which KIT alleles are involved. At birth, most of the white hair is rooted in unpigmented pink skin. The pink skin lacks melanocytes, and appears pink from the underlying network of capillaries. White spotting is not known to affect eye color, and most white horses have brown eyes.

=== White or near-white ===
White horses are born with pink skin and a white coat, which they retain throughout their lives. The genetic factors that produce an all-white horse are often also capable of producing a near-white horse, which is mostly white but has some areas that are pigmented normally. Near-white horses most commonly have color in the hair and skin along the topline (dorsal midline) of the horse, in the mane, and on the ears. The color is often interspersed as specks or spots on a white background. In addition, the hooves are usually white, but may have striping if there is pigmented skin on the coronary band just above the hoof. In some cases, foals born with residual non-white hair may lose some or all of this pigment with age, without the help of the gray factor.

=== White spotting ===
White spotting from a W allele is difficult to identify visually, as it can range from small white markings in the case of a heterozygous W20 horse all the way to an obvious pinto pattern. In addition, even completely white horses can have genes which by themselves would only give white spotting, such as W20 combined with W22 or W5 combined with W10. As such, the only reliable way to find out whether a horse has one of the known white spotting patterns from an allele on KIT is to have it genetically tested.

== Prevalence ==
Dominant white is one of several potential genetic causes for horses with near-white or completely white coats; it may occur through spontaneous mutation, and thus may be found unexpectedly in any breed, even those that discourage excessive white markings. To date, forms of dominant white have been identified in Thoroughbreds, Standardbreds, American Quarter Horses, Frederiksborg horses, Icelandic horses, Shetland ponies, Franches-Montagnes horses, South German Draft horses, and the Arabian horse. The Camarillo White Horse is noted for its completely white coat.

== Inheritance ==
The W locus was mapped to the KIT gene in 2007. KIT is short for "KIT proto-oncogene receptor tyrosine kinase". White spotting is caused by multiple forms, or alleles, of the KIT gene. All horses possess the KIT gene, as it is necessary for survival even at the earliest stages of development. The presence or absence of dominant white is based on the presence of certain altered variants of KIT. Each unique form is called an allele, and for every trait, all animals inherit one allele from each parent. The original or "normal" form of KIT, which is expected in horses without dominant white spotting, is called the "wild type" allele. Thus, a dominant white horse has at least one KIT allele with a mutation associated with dominant white spotting.

=== Allelic series ===
The KIT gene contains over 2000 base pairs, and a change in any of those base pairs results in a mutant allele. Over forty seven such alleles have been identified by sequencing the KIT genes of various horses. The resultant phenotype of many of these alleles is not yet known, but over 30 have been linked to white spotting. DNA tests can identify if a horse carries the identified W alleles.

- SB-1 (Sabino 1) was first identified in 2005. The allele was designated with "SB" in an attempt to align with traditional equine coat color terminology. It is located on the KIT gene and is a single nucleotide polymorphism designated KI16+1037A. The mutation results in the skipping of exon 17.When heterozygous, it creates a distinctive white spotting pattern of irregular, rough-edged white patches that usually include two or more white feet or legs, a blaze, spots or roaning on the belly or flanks, and jagged margins to white markings. Homozygous foals are typically at least 90% white-coated at birth, and sometimes termed "Sabino-White."
- W1 was the second KIT allele found to be involved in horse coat color. The researchers who discovered W1-4 decided to name them "W" following the convention in mice, rather than continuing the "SB" series. W1 is found in Franches-Montagnes horses descended from a white mare named Cigale born in 1957. Cigale's parents' coats were not extensively marked. A single nucleotide polymorphism (SNP), a type of mutation in which a single nucleotide is accidentally exchanged for another, is thought to have occurred with Cigale. This mutation (c.2151C>G) is predicted to truncate the protein in the middle of the tyrosine kinase domain, which would severely affect the function of KIT. It is a nonsense mutation located on exon 15 of KIT. Some horses with the W1 mutation are born pure white, but many have residual pigment along the topline, which they may then lose over time. Based on studies of KIT mutations in mice, the severity of this mutation suggests that it may be nonviable in the homozygous state. However, horses with the W1 mutation have been found to have normal blood parameters and do not suffer from anemia.

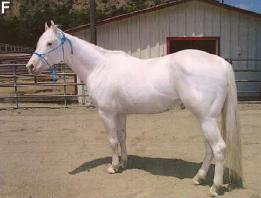
The Camarillo White Horse breed has a dominant white coat attributed to the W4 mutation.

- W2 is found in Thoroughbred horses descended from KY Colonel, a stallion born in 1946. While KY Colonel was described as a chestnut with extensive white markings, he is known for siring a family of pure white horses through his white daughter, White Beauty, born in 1963. His son War Colors was registered as roan because he had some spots of color, but later became white. The W2 allele is linked to a single nucleotide polymorphism (c.1960G>A), a missense mutation where a glycine is replaced with arginine (p.G654R) in the protein kinase domain, located on exon 17.
- W3 is found in Arabian horses descended from R Khasper, a near-white stallion born in 1996. Neither of his parents were white, and the causative mutation (c.706A>T) is thought to have originated with this horse. It is a nonsense mutation on exon 4, predicted to truncate the protein in the extracellular domain. Horses with the W3 allele often retain interspersed flecks or regions of pigmented skin and hair, which may fade with time. Some members of this family possess blue eyes, but these are thought to be inherited separately from the white coat. Based on similar studies in mice, researchers have named W3 as potentially homozygous nonviable.
- W4 is found in Camarillo White Horses, a breed characterized by a white coat, beginning with a spontaneous white stallion born in 1912 named Sultan. Like W1 and W3, these horses may be pure white or near-white, with pigmented areas along the topline that fade with time. This mutation is an SNP (c.1805C>T) which produces a missense mutation replacing alanine with valine in the kinase domain, on exon 12.

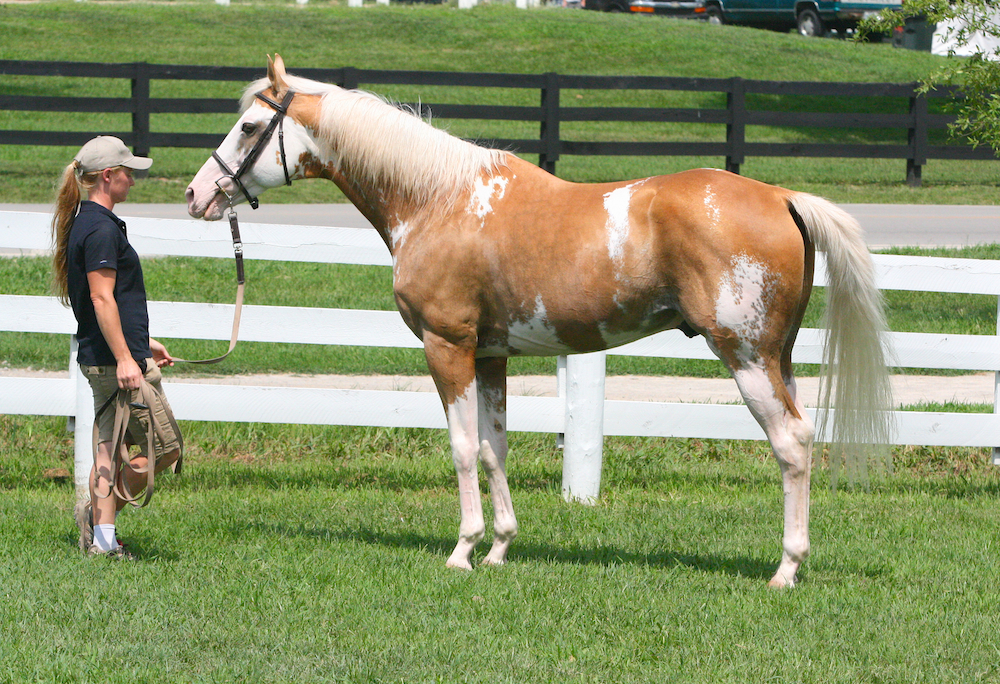
This palomino horse carries the W5 mutation, which usually causes irregular sabino-like markings.

- W5 is found in Thoroughbreds descending from Puchilingui, a 1984 stallion with white spotting and roaning. Horses with the W5 allele exhibit a huge range in white phenotype: a few have been pure white or near-white, while others have sabino-like spotting limited to high, irregular stockings and blazes that covered the face. Twenty-two members of this family were studied, and the 12 with some degree of white spotting were found to have a deletion in exon 15 (p.T732QfsX9), in the form of a frameshift mutation. A later study found that the members of this family with the greatest depigmentation were compound heterozygotes who also carried the W20 allele.
- W6 is found in one near-white Thoroughbred named Marumatsu Live born to non-white parents in 2004. The potential range of expressivity, therefore, is not yet known. The mutation (c.856G>A) is thought to have occurred spontaneously in this horse. It is a missense mutation on exon 5.
- W7 is found in another near-white Thoroughbred named Turf Club born in 2005 to a dam that had nine other offspring, all non-white. The dam did not possess the W7 allele, which results from a splice site mutation (c.338-1G>C), located on intron 2 of KIT.
- W8 was found in an Icelandic horse with sabino-like white spotting, mottling, and roaning, named Þokkadís vom Rosenhof. Both parents and four maternal half-siblings, all non-white, were found without the W8 allele. The W8 allele is also a splice site mutation (c.2222-1G>A), located on intron 15.
- W9 was found in an all-white Holsteiner horse with a single nucleotide polymorphism (c.1789G>A). No relatives were studied, but both parents are non-white. It is a missense mutation on exon 12.
- W10 was found in a study of 27 horses in a family of American Quarter Horses, 10 of which were white or spotted and 17 that were solid and non-white. The 10 family members with W10 had a frameshifting deletion in exon 7 (c.1126_1129delGAAC). Like W5, a wide range of phenotypes were observed. The most modestly marked had large amounts of white on the face and legs and some medium-sized belly spots, while another was nearly all-white. The founder of this line was GQ Santana, foaled in 2000.
- W11 is found in a family of South German Coldbloods descending from a single white stallion, in which the causative mutation is thought to have originated. The stallion is suspected to be Schimmel, foaled in 1997. The mutation responsible for the W11 phenotype is a splice site mutation of intron 20 (c.2684+1G>A).
- W12 was found in a single Thoroughbred colt, about half white, who both was born and died in 2010. The mutation is a deletion mutation found on exon 3.
- W13 causes a fully white phenotype, and appears to be homozygous lethal. It was first found in a family Quarter Horse and Paso Peruviano crossbreds, and since has been seen in multiple horse and pony breeds, including some not descended from Quarter horse ancestors. The cause is a splice site mutation on intron 17.

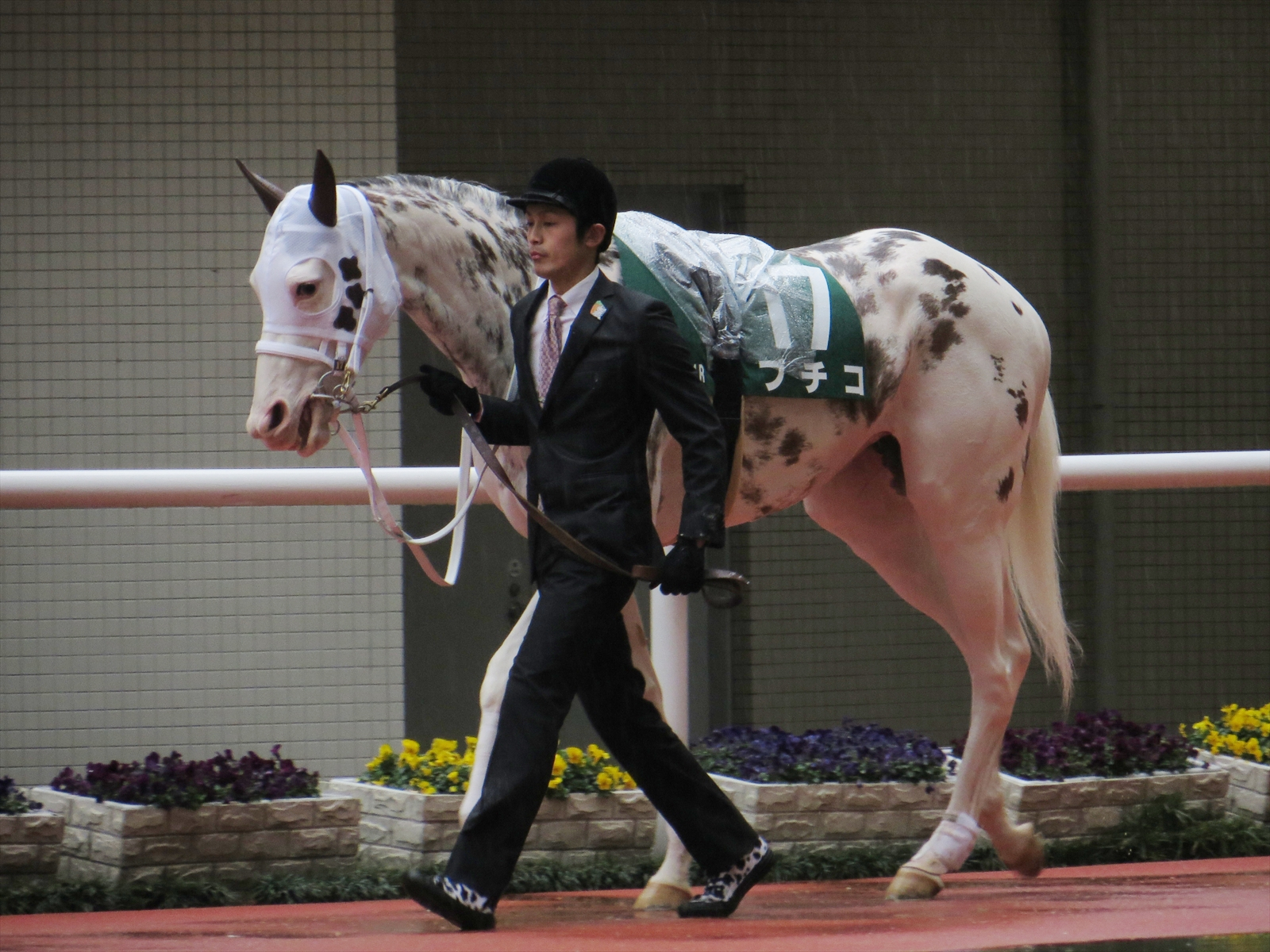
This near-white mare, Buchiko, is a daughter of Shirayukihime, the suspected founder of the W14 mutation. Horses with W14 are often fully white.

- W14 is a deletion mutation on exon 17, found in Thoroughbreds. The founder is suspected to be Shirayukihime, born in 1996. Horses with this mutation are usually fully white but may have some spots of color.
- W15 is found in Arabians, and is a missense mutation on exon 10. The founder is suspected to be Khartoon Khlassic, born in 1996. Horses heterozygous for W15 tend to be partially white, while homozygotes are fully white.
- W16 is found in the Oldenburger and is a missense mutation on exon 18. The three horses studied looked like roany sabinos or near whites, and the founder is suspected to be Celene, born in 2003.
- W17 is found in a Japanese Draft horse and is a pair of missense mutations on exon 14. The horse studied was white with one brown eye and one blue eye.
- W18 is a splice site mutation on intron 8 (c.1346 +1G>A) found in a bay Swiss Warmblood named Colorina von Hoff, who had extensive speckling. Both parents were solid-colored and had no extended head or leg markings.
- W19 was first found in three Arabianss with bald face markings, white leg markings extending above the knees and hocks, and irregular belly spots. All three horses tested negative for sabino-1, frame overo and splashed white. W19 is a missense mutation on exon 8 (c.1322A.G; p.Tur41Cys). The founder is suspected to be Fantasia Vu, born in 1990. W19 causes a bald face, extensive leg white, and belly spots. One horse has tested as W19/W19, indicating this allele is likely not homozygous lethal. However, all W19/W19 have presented at birth as maximum white and all that have been tested at maturity have been sterile.

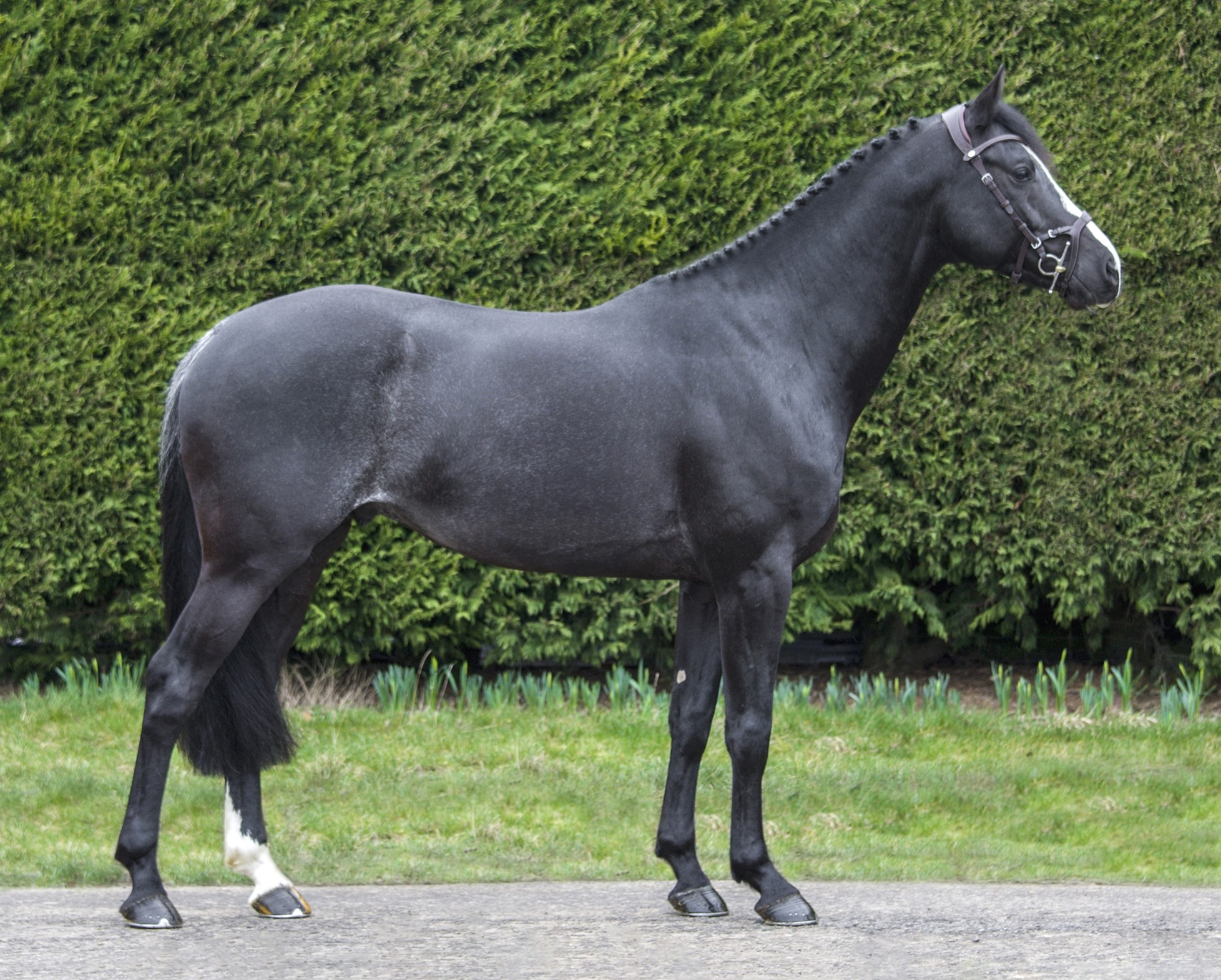
This horse tested homozygous for W20, and also exhibits a rabicano roaning pattern.

- W20 is associated with bold face and leg markings, and can greatly increase the amount of white when combined with certain other white patterns. The W20 sequence was first discovered in 2007, but was not recognized for its effect on coat color until 2013. Horses with one copy of W5 or W22 combined with one copy of W20 tend to be white or nearly all white. W20 on its own does tend towards adding white.

W20 has been found in many breeds including the German Riding Pony, German Warmblood, Thoroughbred, Oldenburger, Welsh pony, Quarter horse, Paint horse, Appaloosa, Noriker, Old-Tori, Gypsy horse, Morgan horse, Clydesdale horse, Franches-Montagnes, Marwari horse, South German Draft, Paso Peruano, Camarillo White Horse, and Hanoverian horse.
W20 is a missense mutation on exon 14 (c.2045G>A; p.Arg682His).

- W21 is a single nucleotide deletion found in Icelandics. The founder is Ellert frá Baldurshaga, who has a mostly white face with speckles and irregular patches of white across his body. The color has been named "ýruskjóttur".
- W22 is a deletion thought to have originated in the Thoroughbred mare Not Quite White, born in 1989. She passed it to her two foals Airdrie Apache and Spotted Lady. On its own, W22 is sabino-like, but when paired with W20, it gives a completely white horse.
- W23 was found in the white Arabian stallion Boomori Simply Stunning, who had two white foals Meadowview Ivory and Just a Dream. However, the line appears to have died out.
- W24 is a mutation that disrupts splicing of KIT. The founder is a white Trottatore Italiano named Via Lattea, born in 2014.
- W25 is a missense mutation on exon 4. The founder is suspected to be the Australian Thoroughbred mare Laughyoumay. She has had one pure white foal with blue eyes, who also carries frame, and one near-white colt with some color on and around the ears.
- W26 is a single base pair deletion suspected to have originated with the Australian Thoroughbred mare Marbrowell, born in 1997.
- W27 is a missense mutation thought to originate with the Australian Thoroughbred mare Milady Fair. Most horses with this mutation are descended from her great-grand-colt, Colorful Gambler, who has an extensive sabino-like pattern.
- W28 is a deletion found in a German Riding Pony.
- W29 has not been assigned.
- W30 is found in a family of Berber horses. It is a missense mutation identical to the second missense mutation in W17. The horses with W30 are white or almost fully white.
- W31 traces to an American Quarter Horse stallion, Cookin Merada. It leads to an early stop on the KIT protein sequence, truncating the protein.
- W32 was found in a family of American Paint Horses, and seems to have a mild effect leading to high white on the limbs, belly spots and white facial markings. It is unclear whether the SNP described is actually the causative mutation, or merely linked to it.
- W33 is a de novo variant found in a Standardbred horse that results in sabino-like white spotting.
- W34 is a missense mutation linked to increased white spotting, found in multiple breeds including the American Paint Horse, American Quarter Horse, Appaloosa, Arabian, Mangalarga, Morgan, Mustang, Rocky Mountain horse and some Warmblood breeds.
- W35 is associated with more white than is usually seen on Quarter horses. Researchers found a mutation in the untranslated region on the 5' side of KIT that correlates with the increased white, but it may only be a nearby marker rather than the actual cause. This variant is also called "Holiday" after the horse in which it was discovered. Some horses are homozygous for the marker.
- W37, W38, and W39 have also been described.
- Classic Roan is associated with the KIT gene.
- Tobiano is caused by an inversion starting about 100 kb downstream of KIT, and is also considered an allele of KIT.

These alleles do not account for all dominantly inherited white spotting in horses. More KIT alleles are expected to be found with roles in white spotting. Most W alleles occur within a specific breed or family and arise as spontaneous mutations. KIT appears to be prone to mutation, in part due to its many exons, so new alleles of W can occur in any breed. There are likely many KIT variants in the global horse population that have not yet been investigated.

=== Relation to sabino ===
Sabino can refer either specifically to Sabino 1 (SB1) or to a variety of visually similar spotting patterns. SB1 creates a nearly pure white horse when homozygous, and bold spotting when heterozygous. To add to the confusion, white spotting created by several W alleles, such as W5, W15, and W19 creates patterns that historically were called sabino. For that reason, the use of the word "sabino" is evolving. Genetically, Sabino 1 is simply another allele on KIT, and thus can be classified in the same "family" of KIT mutations as the alleles labeled W or dominant white.

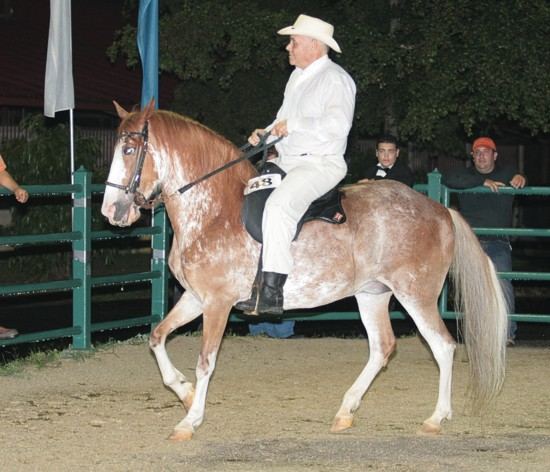
The arrangement of irregular white markings on this Paso Fino is typical of heterozygous Sabino-1, other sabino-like patterns, and some alleles of dominant white. Such ambiguous white markings are usually called "sabino" in the absence of a DNA test to determine the genetic mechanism actually involved.

In its homozygous form, Sabino 1 can be confused with dominant white alleles such as W1, W2, W3, or W4 that create a white or near-white horse with only one copy. Both dominant white and "Sabino-White" horses are identified by all-white or near-white coats with underlying pink skin and dark eyes, often with residual pigment along the dorsal midline. However, it takes two copies of Sabino 1 to produce a Sabino-white horse, and Sabino 1 is not homozygous lethal.

Initially, dominant white was separated from sabino on the grounds that the former had to be entirely white, while the latter could possess some pigment. However, the 2007 and 2009 studies of dominant white showed that many dominant white alleles produce a range of white phenotypes that include horses with pigmented spots in their hair and skin. Each of the larger families of dominant white studied included pure-white horses, horses described as having "sabino-like" white markings, as well as white horses described as "maximal sabino".

More recently, dominant white and sabino were distinguished from one another on the grounds that dominant white alleles produce nonviable embryos in the homozygous state, while Sabino 1 was viable when homozygous. However, not all KIT alleles currently identified as "dominant white" have been proven lethal, and in fact W20 is known to be viable in the homozygous form.

The similarities between Dominant White and Sabino 1 reflect their common molecular origin: The W series and SB1 have both been mapped to KIT. The researchers who mapped Sabino 1 in 2005 suggested that other sabino-like patterns might also map to KIT, which has been the case for many other alleles discovered since that time, including major alleles for white leg and facial markings that have also been mapped to or near to the KIT gene.

=== Molecular genetics ===
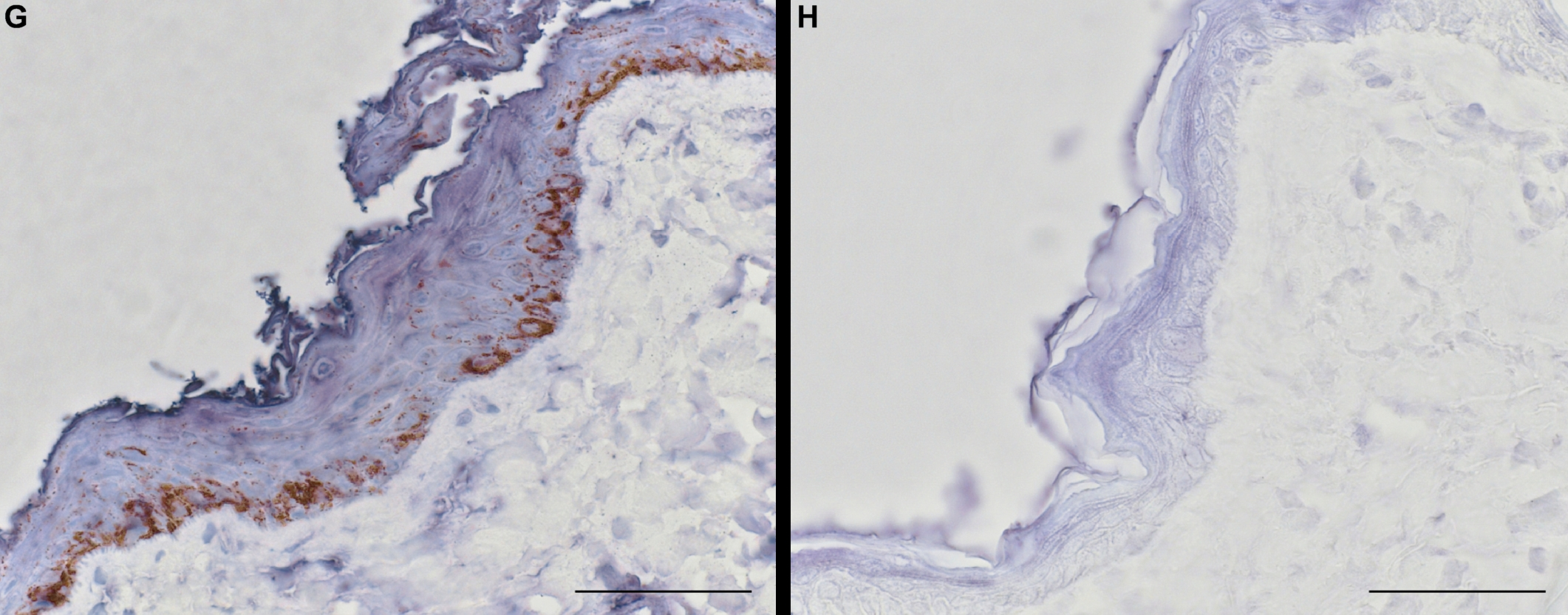
Skin biopsies of non-white (left) and white horses. Blue staining identifies Kit protein activity, while melanin is visible in the non-white sample as brown granules. The sample from the white horse shows reduced Kit activity, no melanocytes, and no melanin.

The KIT gene encodes a protein called steel factor receptor, which is critical to the differentiation of stem cells into blood cells, sperm cells, and pigment cells. A process called alternative splicing, which uses the information encoded in the KIT gene to make slightly different proteins (isoforms) for use in different circumstances, may impact whether a mutation on KIT affects blood cells, sperm cells, or pigment cells. Steel factor receptor interacts chemically with steel factor or stem cell factor to relay chemical messages. These messages are used during embryonic development to signal the migration of early melanocytes (pigment cells) from the neural crest tissue to their eventual destinations in the dermal layer. The neural crest is a transient tissue in the embryo that lies along the dorsal line. Melanocytes migrate along the dorsal line to a number of specific sites: near the eye, near the ear, and the top of the head; six sites along each side of the body, and a few along the tail. At these sites, the cells undergo a few rounds of replication and differentiation, and then migrate down and around the body from the dorsal aspect towards the ventral aspect and the limb buds.

The timing of this migration is critical; all white markings, from a small star to a pure white coat, are caused by the failed migration of melanocytes.

A certain degree of the eventual amount of white, and its "design", is completely random. The development of an organism from single-celled to fully formed is a process with many, many steps. Even beginning with identical genomes, as in clones and identical twins, the process is unlikely to occur the same way twice. A process with this element of randomness is called a stochastic process, and cell differentiation is, in part, a stochastic process. The stochastic element of development is partly responsible for the eventual appearance of white on a horse, potentially accounting for nearly a quarter of the phenotype. The research team that studied dominant white cited "subtle variations in the amount of residual KIT protein" as a potential cause for the variability in phenotype of horses with the same allele. They also speculated that variability in the phenotype of horses with W1 might be caused by "different efficacies of [nonsense-mediated decay] in different individuals and in different body regions." That is, some horses destroy more of the mutant KIT protein than others.

=== Lethality ===
Early embryonal lethality, also known as early embryonic death or a non-viable embryo, may occur when the embryo possesses two copies of certain dominant white alleles. The reason for this is that several mutations of W are caused by nonsense mutations, frameshift mutations or DNA deletions, which, if homozygous, would make it impossible to produce a functional KIT protein. However, it appears that not all W alleles are embryonic lethals. Homozygous embryos from alleles of certain missense and splice site mutations are sometimes viable, apparently because they have less effect on gene function. For instance, W1 is a nonsense mutation and it is thought that horses with the genotype W1/W1 would die in utero, while W20 is a missense mutation and living horses with the W20/W20 genotype have been found. A 2013 study also located horses that were compound W5/W20 heterozygotes, almost completely white, essentially with greater depigmentation than could be accounted for by either allele alone.

== "White" horses that are not dominant white ==
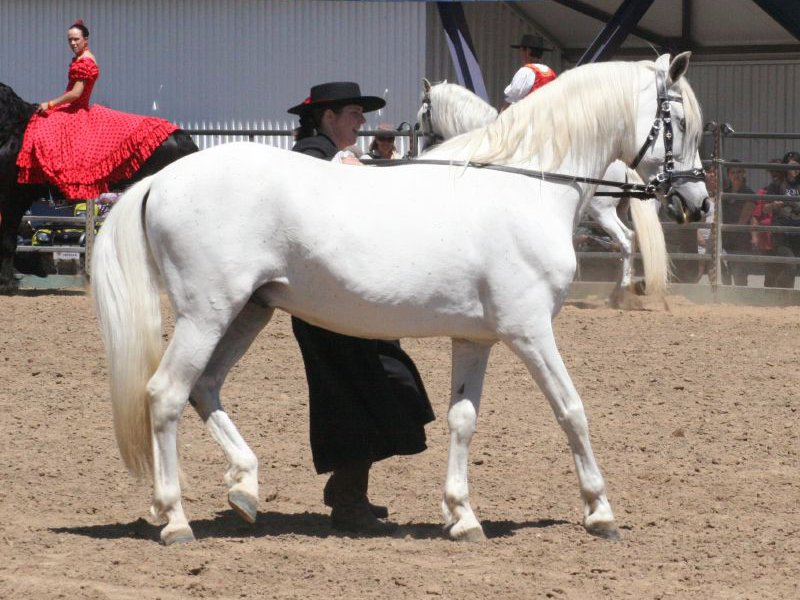
The dark skin under a white hair coat, easily seen at the muzzle and genitals, shows that this white-looking horse is actually a gray. Most horses that look "white" are actually grays.

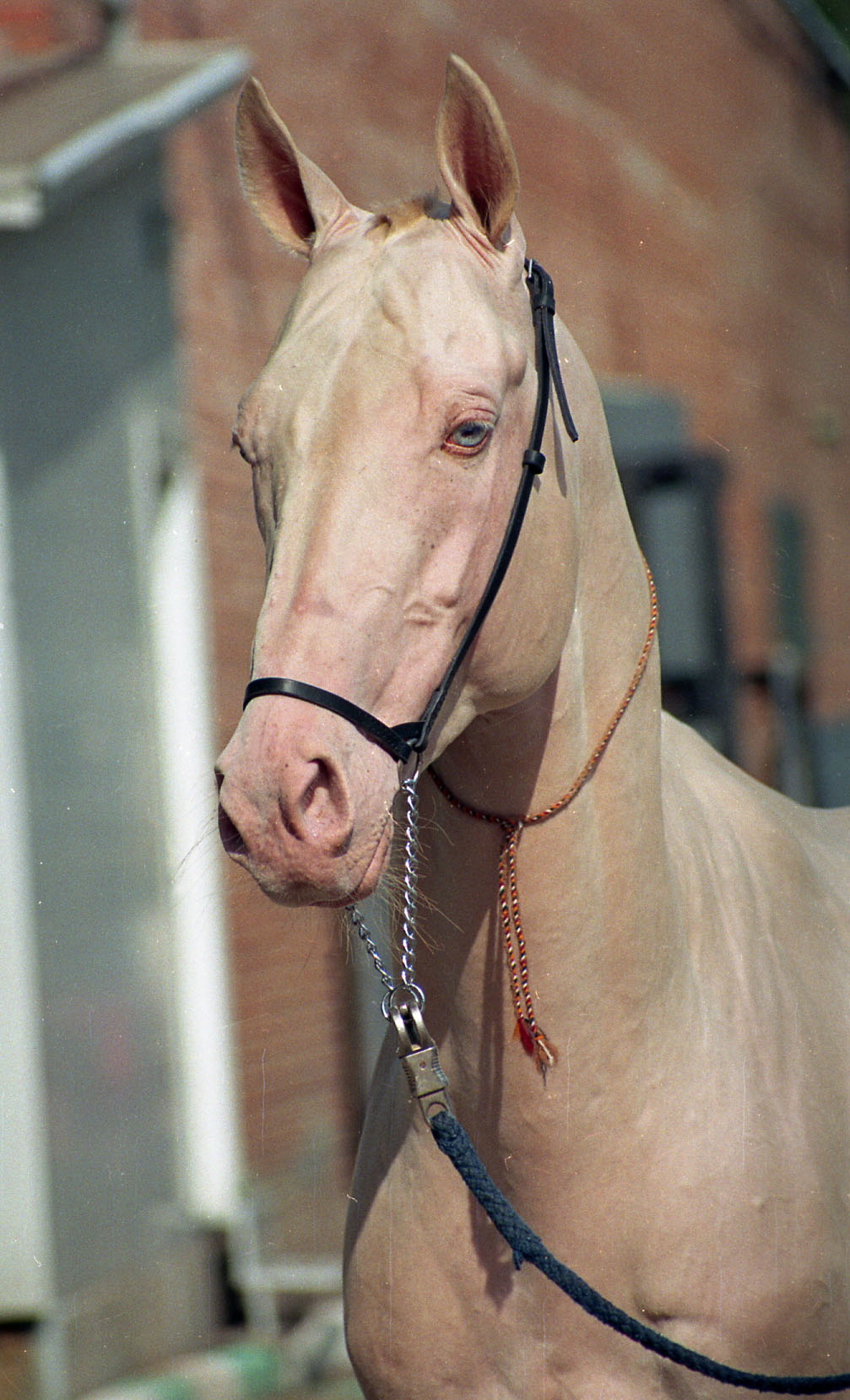
Pale blue eyes, rosy-pink skin and cream-colored hair identify the presence of some sort of dilution gene, most often the cream gene. This cremello is neither white nor gray.

White horses are potent symbols in many cultures. An array of horse coat colors may be identified as "white", often inaccurately, and many are genetically distinct from "dominant white".

"Albino" horses have never been documented, despite references to so-called "albino" horses. Dominant white is caused by the absence of pigment cells (melanocytes), whereas albino animals have a normal distribution of melanocytes. Also, a diagnosis of albinism in humans is based on visual impairment, which has not been described in horses with dominant white nor similar coat colors. In other mammals, the diagnosis of albinism is based on the impairment of tyrosinase production. No mutations of the tyrosinase gene are known in horses, however, cream and pearl colors result from mutations to a protein involved in tyrosinase transport.

=== Non-white colors ===
- Cremello or Blue-eyed cream horses have rosy pink skin, pale blue eyes and cream-colored coats, indicating that pigment cells and pigment are present in the skin, eyes, and coat, but at lower levels. White horses do not have pigment cells, and thus no pigment, in the skin or coat. In addition, dominant white horses seldom have blue eyes. Other genetic factors, or combinations of genetic factors, such as the pearl gene or champagne gene, can also produce cremello-like coats. These coat colors may be distinguishable from dominant white by their unusually colored eyes.
- Gray horses are born any color and progressively replace their colored coat with gray and white hairs. Most gray horses have dark skin, unless they happen to also carry genes for pink or unpigmented skin. Unlike white horses, grays are not born white, nor is their skin color affected by their coat color change.
- Leopard complex horses, such as the Appaloosa and Knabstrupper breeds, are genetically quite distinct from all other white spotting patterns. The fewspot leopard pattern, however, can resemble white. Two factors influence the eventual appearance of a leopard complex coat: whether one copy or two copies of the Leopard alleles are present, and the degree of dense leopard-associated white patterning that is present at birth. If a foal is homozygous for the LP allele and has extensive dense white patterning, they will appear nearly white at birth, and may continue to lighten with age. In other parts of the world, these horses are called "white born." "White born" foals are less common among Appaloosa horses, which tend to have blankets and varnish roans, than Knabstruppers or Norikers, which tend to be full leopards.

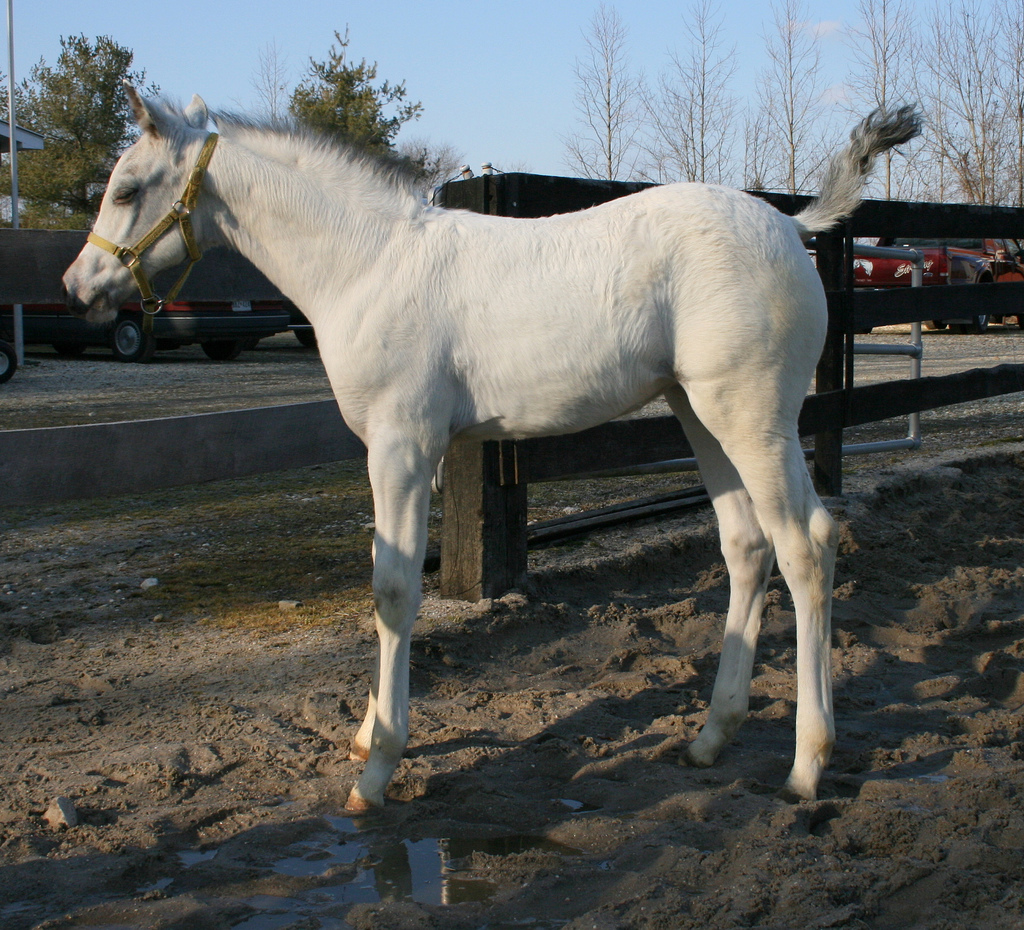
This "white-born" or "fewspot" Appaloosa foal is hard to distinguish from white without familiarity with the leopard complex and the animal's pedigree.

- Tovero, Medicine hat or War bonnet are terms sometimes applied to Pinto horses with residual non-white areas only around the head, especially the ears and poll, while most of the remaining coat is white. While dominant white horses may have areas of residual pigment only around the ears and poll, the term "medicine hat" usually refers to horses with more commonly known white spotting genes, most often tobiano, combined with frame overo, sabino or splashed white.

=== Lethal white overo ===
Foals with lethal white syndrome (LWS) have two copies of the frame overo gene and are born with white or nearly white coats and pink skin. However, unlike dominant white horses, foals with LWS are born with an underdeveloped colon that is untreatable, and if not euthanized, invariably die of colic within a few days of birth. Horses that carry only one allele of the LWS gene are healthy and typically exhibit the "frame overo" spotting pattern. In cases of "solid" horses with frame overo ancestry, uncertain "overo" (non-tobiano) phenotype, or horses with multiple patterns, the LWS allele can be detected by DNA test.

=== Mosaicism ===
Mosaicism in horses is thought to account for some spontaneous occurrences of white, near-white, spotted, and roan horses. Mosaicism refers to mutations that occur after the single-cell stage, and therefore affect only a portion of the adult cells. Mosaicism may be one possible cause for the rare occurrence of brindle coloring in horses. Mosaic-white horses would be visually indistinguishable from dominant whites. Mosaicism could produce white or partially white foals if a stem cell in the developing foal underwent a mutation, or change to the DNA, that resulted in unpigmented skin and hair. The cells that descend from the affected stem cell will exhibit the mutation, while the rest of the cells are unaffected.

A mosaic mutation may or may not be inheritable, depending on the cell populations affected. Though this is not always the case, genetic mutations can occur spontaneously in one sex cell of a parent during gametogenesis. In these cases, called germline mutations, the mutation will be present in the single-celled zygote conceived from the affected sperm or egg cell, and the condition can be inherited by the next generation.

== History of dominant white research ==
Dominant white horses were first described in scientific literature in 1912. Horse breeder William P. Newell described his family of white and near-white horses to researcher A. P. Sturtevant of Columbia University:

"The colour of skin is white or so-called pink, usually with a few small dark specks in skin. Some have a great many dark spots in skin. These latter usually have a few dark stripes in hoofs; otherwise the hoofs are almost invariably white. Those that do not have dark specks in skin usually have glass or watch eyes, otherwise dark eyes ... I have one colt coming one year old that is pure white, not a coloured speck on him, not a coloured hair on him, and with glass [blue] eyes."

Sturtevant and his contemporaries agreed that this colt's blue eyes were inherited separately from his white coat. In 1912, Sturtevant assigned the "white" trait to the White or W locus. At the time there was no means of assigning W to a position on the chromosome, or to a gene.

This family of white horses produced Old King in 1908, a dark-eyed white stallion that was purchased by Caleb R. and Hudson B. Thompson. Old King was bred to Morgan mares to produce a breed of horse known today as the American White Horse. A grandson of Old King, Snow King, was at the center of the first major study of the dominant white coat color in horses, conducted in 1969 by Dr. William L. Pulos of Alfred University and Dr. Frederick B. Hutt of Cornell. They concluded, based on test matings and progeny phenotype ratios, that the white coat was dominantly inherited and embryonic lethal in the homozygous state. Other factors, such as variations in expressivity and the influence of multiple genes, may have influenced the progeny ratios that Pulos and Hutt observed. The white coat of the American White Horse has not yet been mapped.

A 1924 study by C. Wriedt identified a heritable white coat color in the Frederiksborg horse. Wriedt described a range of what he considered to be homozygote phenotypes: all-white, white with pigmented flecks, or weißgraue, which transliterates to "white-gray." The German term for gray horse is schimmel, not weißgraue. Heterozygotes, according to Wriedt, ranged from roaned or diluted to more or less solid white horses. Reviewers, such as Miguel Odriozola, reinterpreted Wriedt's data in successive years, while Pulos and Hutt felt that his work had been "erroneous" because Wriedt never concluded that white was lethal when homozygous.

Other researchers prior to modern DNA analysis developed remarkably prescient theories. The gene itself was first proposed and named W in 1948. In a 1969 work on horse coat colors, A los colores del caballo, Miguel Odriozola suggested that various forms of dominantly inherited white spotting might be arranged sequentially along one chromosome, thus allowing for the varied expression of dominant white. He also proposed that other, distant genes might also influence the amount of white present.

The embryonic lethality hypothesis was originally supported by Pulos and Hutt's 1969 study of Mendelian progeny ratios. Conclusions about Mendelian traits that are controlled by a single gene can be drawn from test breedings with large sample sizes. However, traits that are controlled by allelic series or multiple loci are not Mendelian characters, and may not be subject to Mendelian ratios.

Pulos and Hutt knew that if the allele that created a white coat was recessive, then white horses would have to be homozygous for the condition and therefore breeding white horses together would always result in a white foal. However, this did not occur in their study and they concluded that white was not recessive. Conversely, if a white coat was a simple autosomal dominant, ww horses would be non-white, while both Ww and WW horses would be white, and the latter would always produce white offspring. But Pulos and Hutt did not observe any white horses that always produced white offspring, suggesting that homozygous dominant (WW) white horses did not exist. As a result, Pulos and Hutt concluded that white was semidominant and lethal in the homozygous state: ww horses were non-white, Ww were white, and WW died.

Pulos and Hutt reported that neonatal death rates in white foals were similar to those in non-white foals, and concluded that homozygous white fetuses died during gestation. No aborted fetuses were found, suggesting that death occurred early on in embryonic or fetal development and that the fetus was "resorbed."

Prior to Pulos and Hutt's work, researchers were split on the mode of inheritance of white and whether it was deleterious (harmful). Recent research has discovered several possible genetic pathways to a white coat, so disparities in these historical findings may reflect the action of different genes. It is also possible that the varied origins of Pulos and Hutt's white horses might be responsible for the lack of homozygotes. It now appears that not all equine dominant white mutations cause embryonic lethality in the homozygous state.

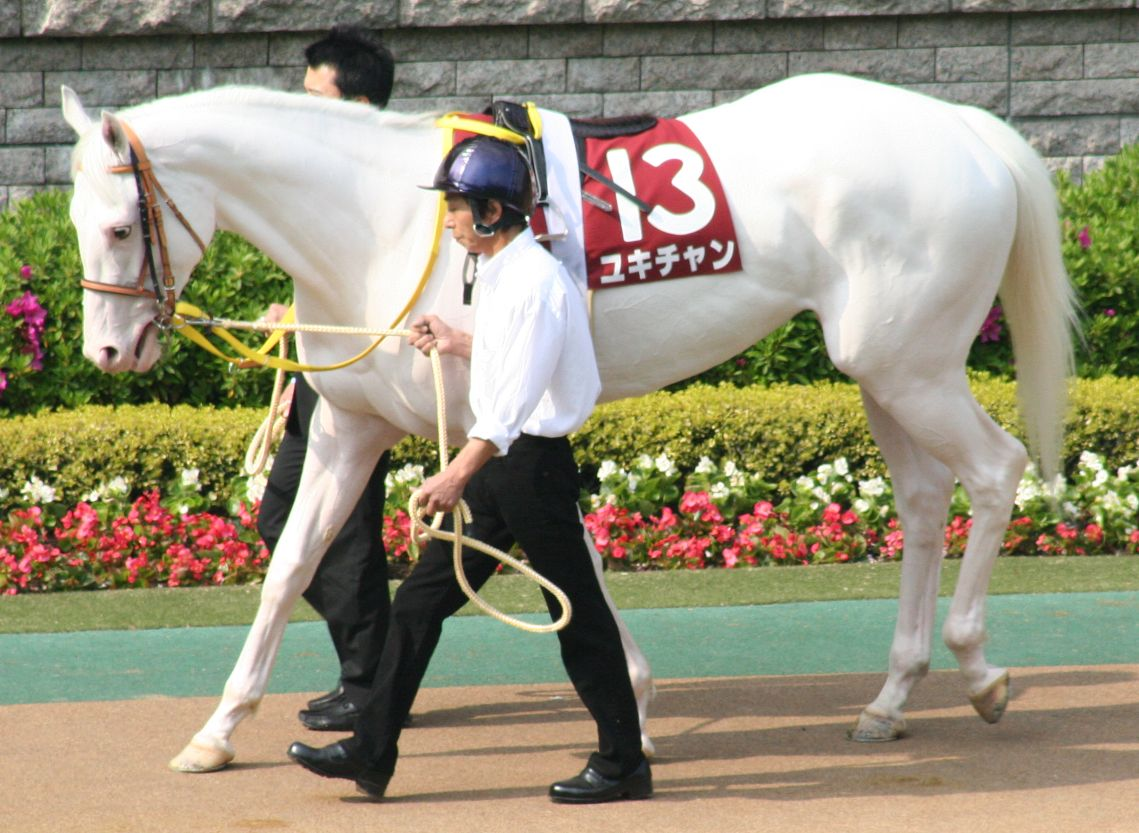
This mare (W14/+) is the daughter of Shirayukihime, who is thought to be the founder of the W14 mutation.

The white (W) locus was first recognized in mice in 1908. The mutation of the same name produces a belly spot and interspersed white hairs on the dorsal aspect of the coat in the heterozygote (W/+) and black-eyed white in the homozygote (W/W). While heterozygotes are healthy, homozygous W mice have severe macrocytic anemia and die within days. A mutation which affects multiple systems is "pleiotropic." Following the mapping of the KIT gene to the W locus in 1988, researchers began identifying other mutations as part of an allelic series of W. There are dozens of known alleles, each representing a unique mutation on the KIT gene, which primarily produce white spotting from tiny head spots to fully white coats, macrocytic anemia from mild to lethal, and sterility. Some alleles, such as splash produce white spotting alone, while others affect the health of the animal even in the heterozygous state. Alleles encoding small amounts of white are no more likely to be linked with anemia and sterility than those encoding conspicuous white. Presently, no anecdotal or research evidence has suggested that equine KIT mutations affect health or fertility. A recent study showed that blood parameters in horses with the W1 mutation were normal.

Between the time of Pulos and Hutt's study in 1969 and the beginning of molecular-level research into dominant white in the 21st century, a pattern known as "Sabino" began to describe certain white phenotypes. The first allele of the W series identified by researchers was an incomplete dominant that was named Sabino-1 (SB-1). It is found on the same locus as other W alleles. When homozygous, SB-1 can produce nearly all-white horses.

In 2007, researchers from Switzerland and the United States published a paper identifying the genetic cause of dominant white spotting in horses from the Franches Montagnes horse, Camarillo White Horse, Arabian horse and Thoroughbred breeds. Each of these dominant white conditions had occurred separately and spontaneously in the past 75 years, and each represents a different allele (variation or form) of the same gene. These same researchers identified a further seven unique causes of dominant white in 2009: three in distinct families of Thoroughbreds, one Icelandic horse, one Holsteiner, a large family of American Quarter Horses and a family of South German Draft horses.

== Homologous conditions ==
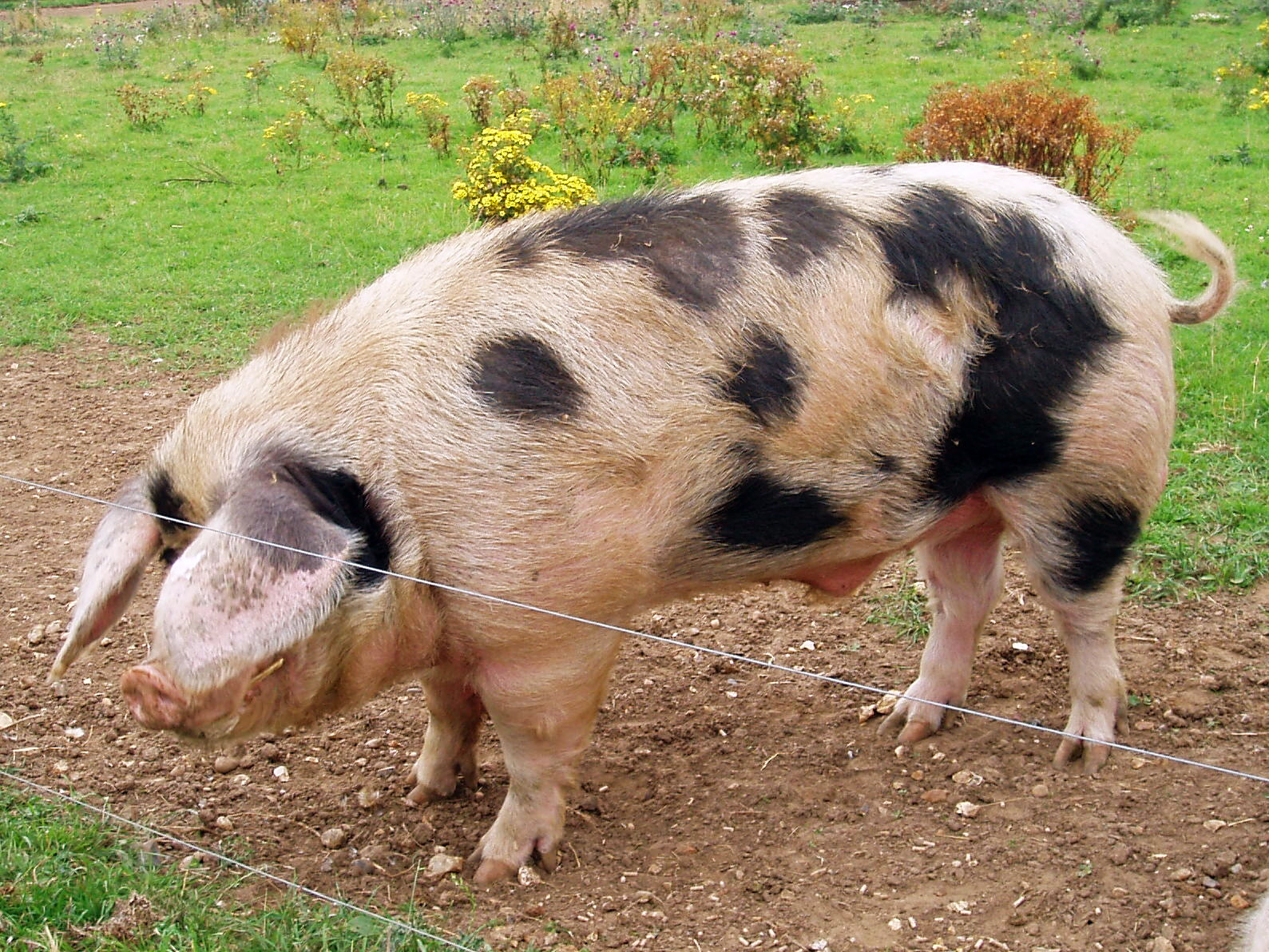
Some spotted patterns on pigs, such as this one, are caused by polymorphisms of the porcine KIT gene.

In humans, a skin condition called piebaldism is caused by more than a dozen distinct mutations in the KIT gene. Piebaldism in humans is characterized by a white forelock, and pigmentless patches of skin on the forehead, brow, face, ventral trunk and extremities. Outside of pigmentation, piebaldism is an otherwise benign condition. In pigs, the "patch," "belted," and commercial "white" colors are caused by mutations on the KIT gene. The best-known model for KIT gene function is the mouse, in which over 90 alleles have been described. The various alleles produce everything from white toes and blazes to black-eyed white mice, panda-white to sashed and belted. Many of these alleles are lethal in the homozygous state, lethal when combined, or sublethal due to anemia. Male mice with KIT mutations are often sterile.

== Notes ==
1. Use of the term "wild type" is subjective, as genes undergo changes, called mutation, at statistically regular intervals called mutation rates.
2. A gene is a unit of heredity which encodes the instructions to make molecules. An allele is a specific version of a gene. Geneticists often discuss only two alleles at a time: the "wildtype" or normal allele which encodes the correct molecule, and the mutant allele. When more than two alleles are known, they form an allelic series. A locus is the physical location of a gene on a chromosome.
3. For any particular gene, when an individual inherits two identical alleles, one from each parent, it is homozygous, or a homozygote. When an individual inherits two different alleles, one from each parent, it is heterozygous or a heterozygote.
4. Mendelian traits are characteristics of an organism that are controlled by a single gene. Mendelian traits can be described as dominant if the characteristic is found in heterozygotes, or recessive if not. Dominance and recessiveness are properties of traits, not genes. Defining a trait as dominant (the word dominate is a verb) or recessive depends on how the trait is defined.
