= Camarillo White Horse =

Horse breed

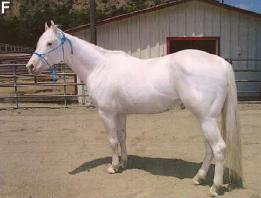
- A Camarillo White Horse
- Country of origin: United States of America

Traits
- Distinguishing features: Pure white, compact, muscular but refined build, clean-cut head, well arched neck.

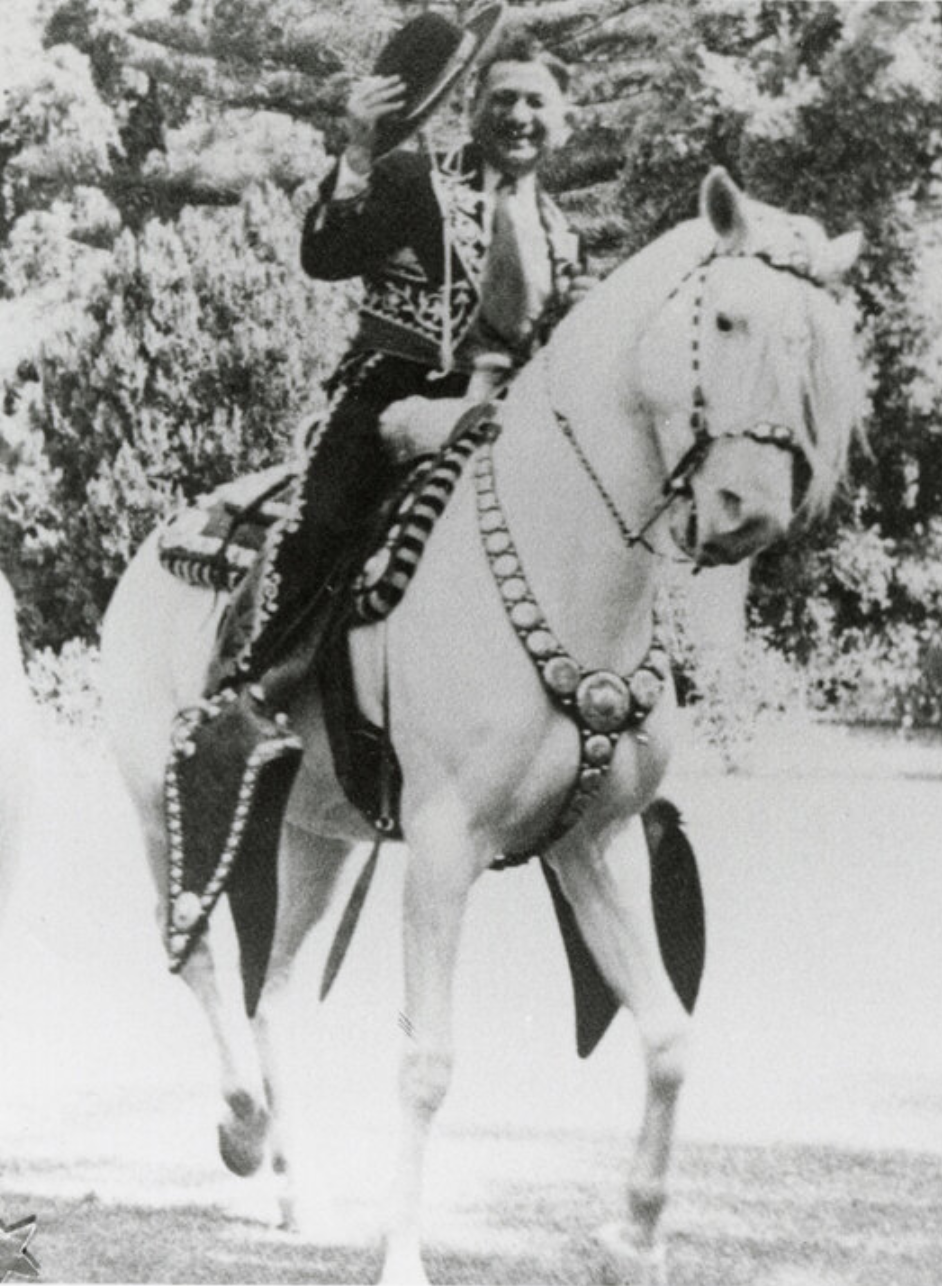
Rider Don Adolfo Camarillo in traditional equestrian attire mounted on a decorated Camarillo white horse.

The Camarillo White Horse is a rare horse breed known for its pure white color. It dates back to 1921, when Adolfo Camarillo, one of the last Californios, purchased a 9-year-old stallion named Sultan at the California State Fair in Sacramento. The Camarillo White horse was owned and bred by the Camarillo family until the death of Adolfo Camarillo's daughter Carmen in 1987.

== Breed characteristics ==
The Camarillo White Horse is known for its pure white color, which includes pink skin under the white hair coat. Unlike a gray horse that is born dark and lightens as it gets older, Camarillo White horses are white from birth and remain white throughout their lives.

The breed is not only a color breed. It has other distinctive physical characteristics, including a compact and refined build. They are known to have strong limbs, an expressive face, large eyes, well-defined withers, laid back shoulders and a well-arched neck.

True white is a difficult color to achieve, because any given mating of a white horse has only a 50% chance to produce white offspring. All known white horses have only one copy of the white gene. It is believed to be impossible for a horse to have two copies, because the embryo would be unable to develop and the pregnancy would terminate.

The color of Camarillo White horses comes from the dominant white allele W4, which as the name suggests, dominantly produces a white color. When homozygous, this allele is believed to be lethal at an early stage of embryonic development.

Camarillo White horses do not carry the genes for Lethal white syndrome.

== Breed history ==
All Camarillo White Horses trace back to a single foundation sire, Sultan, a Spanish Mustang born in 1912 that Camarillo would later describe as a "Stallion of a dream." Camarillo found Sultan at the 1921 California State Fair in Sacramento being shown by the Miller & Lux cattle ranch. Camarillo purchased Sultan and the pair went on to win many championships throughout California.

Camarillo bred Sultan to Morgan mares at the Camarillo Ranch, developing a line of horses privately owned and bred by the Camarillo family for the next 65 years. Upon Camarillo's death in 1958, Adolfo's daughter Carmen took over the horse breeding operation. She continued to show the horses at parades and events for the enjoyment of the people of Ventura County until her death in 1987, when, according to her wishes, the horses were sold at public auction, ending the tradition of exclusive ownership of the breed by the Camarillo family.

In 1989, five individuals decided to regroup the horses for public performances. By 1991, when only 11 horses remained, it became apparent the breed could die out, and the idea for an association began. In 1992, the Camarillo White Horse Association was formed. To avoid inbreeding, the registry has an open stud book, requiring at least one parent to be of Camarillo's original stock, but allowing the other parent to be from various breeds, including Andalusian and Standardbred bloodlines. They also maintain a separate record of non-white foals from these bloodlines.

From the 1930s on, Camarillo White Horses became famous all along the California coast for their performances at various events. They became well known as regular participants in the Tournament of Roses Parade and even attended the parade to open the San Francisco–Oakland Bay Bridge.

They are the official horse of the city of Camarillo. They have appeared in every Santa Barbara Fiesta parade since it began in 1924. Many people of note have ridden Camarillo White Horses, including (then-Governor) Ronald Reagan, 1946 Nobel Peace Prize recipient John Mott, movie star Leo Carrillo, and Steven Ford (son of President Gerald Ford).
