= White horse =

Horse coat color

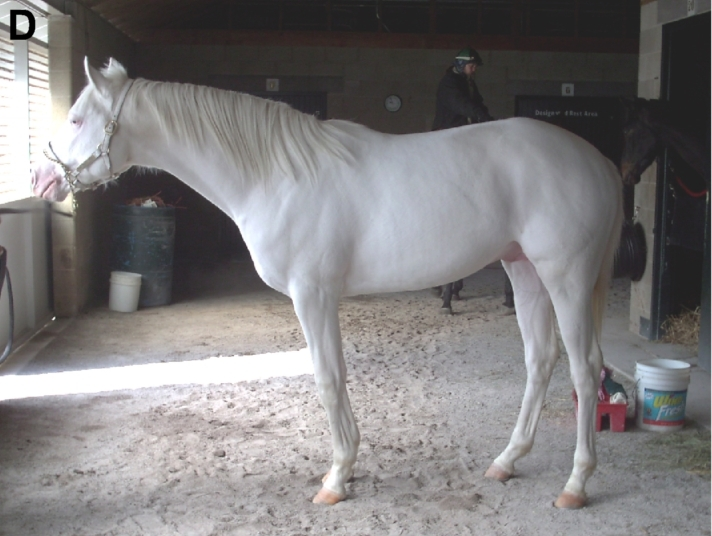
- Dominant purebred white stallion

Genotype
- Base color: Dominant white
- Skin: white (pink)

A white horse is born predominantly white and stays white throughout its life. A white horse has mostly pink skin under its hair coat, and may have brown, blue, or hazel eyes. "True white" horses, especially those that carry one of the dominant white (W) genes, are rare. Most horses that are commonly referred to as "white" are actually "gray" horses whose hair coats are completely white. Gray horses may be born of any color and their hairs gradually turn white as time goes by and take on a white appearance. Nearly all gray horses have dark skin, except under any white markings present at birth. Skin color is the most common method for an observer to distinguish between mature white and gray horses.

== True white horses ==
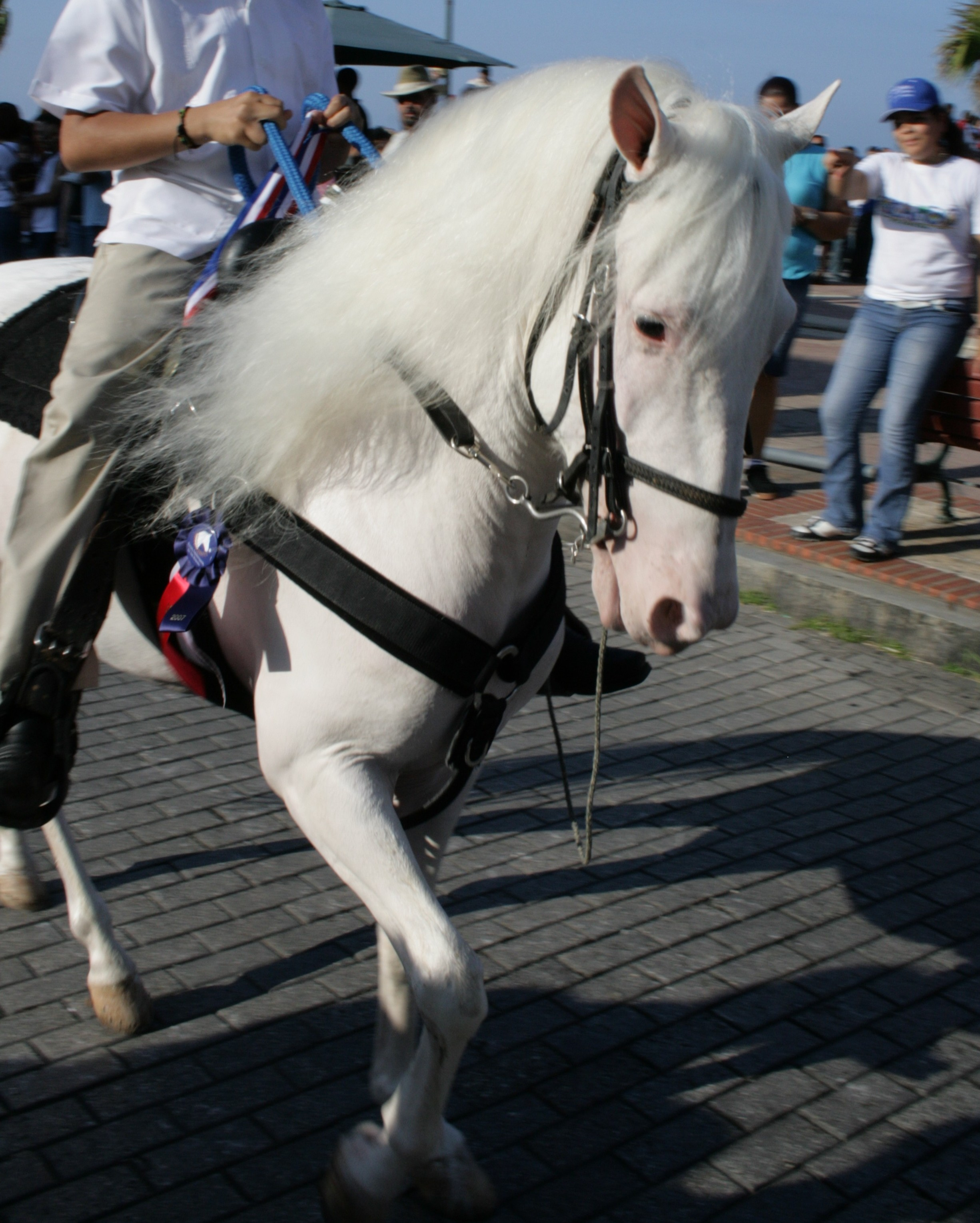
Horse with pink skin, white coat, and dark eyes

White horses have unpigmented skin and a white hair coat. Many white horses have dark eyes, though some have blue eyes. In contrast to gray horses which are born with pigmented skin they keep for life and pigmented hair that lightens to white with age, truly white horses are born with white hair and mostly pink, unpigmented skin. Some white horses are born with partial pigmentation in their skin and hair, which may or may not be retained as they mature, but when a white horse lightens, both skin and hair lose pigmentation. In contrast, grays retain skin pigment and only the hair becomes white.

White colorings, whether white markings, white patterns or dominant white are collectively known as depigmentation phenotypes, and are all caused by areas of skin that lack pigment cells (melanocytes). Depigmentation phenotypes have various genetic causes, and those that have been studied usually map to the EDNRB and KIT genes. However, much about the genetics behind various all-white depigmentation phenotypes are still unknown.

=== Dominant white ===
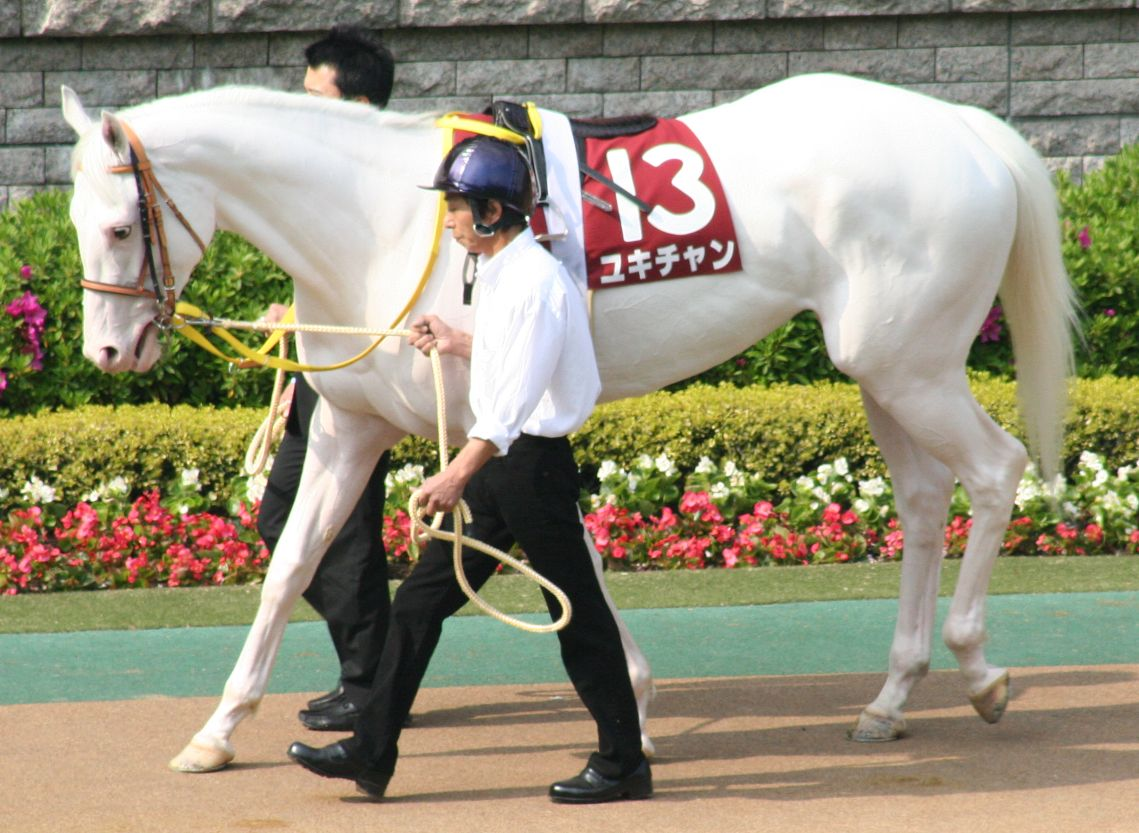
This white Thoroughbred carries W14, one of the forms of dominant white.

Dominant white (W) is a large group of alleles best known for producing pink-skinned all-white horses with brown eyes, though some dominant white horses have residual pigment along the topline. Some W alleles produce white spotting on horses with a predominately dark coat. Dominant white has been studied in Thoroughbreds, Arabian horses, the American White horse, the Camarillo White Horse, and several other breeds. There are 34 identified variants of dominant white as of 2022, plus sabino 1, each corresponding to a spontaneously-white foundation animal and a mutation on the KIT gene. Researchers have suggested that at least some forms of dominant white result in nonviable embryos in the homozygous state, though others are known to be viable as homozygotes. While homologous mutations in mice are often linked to anemia and sterility, no such effects have been observed in dominant white horses. Dominant white horses typically have white noses that can be subject to sunburn.

=== Sabino-white ===
Sabino-white horses are pink-skinned with all-white or nearly-white coats and dark eyes. They are homozygous for the dominant SB1 allele at the Sabino 1 locus, which has been mapped to KIT. Sabino-white was one of the earliest dominant white alleles discovered, but was not originally recognized as such, hence the different name. The Sabino1 allele, and the associated spotting pattern, is found in Miniature horses, American Quarter Horses, American Paint Horses, Tennessee Walkers, Missouri Fox Trotters, Mustangs, Shetland Ponies, and Aztecas. Sabino 1 has not been found in the Arabian horse, Clydesdale, Thoroughbred, Standardbred horse, or Shire horse. The Sabino 1 allele is not linked to any health defects, though sabino-whites may need some protection from sunburn. Horses with only one copy of the Sabino1 gene usually have dramatic spotting, including two or more white legs, often with white running up the front of the leg, extensive white on the face, spotting on the midsection, and jagged or roaned margins to the pattern.

=== White born leopards ===
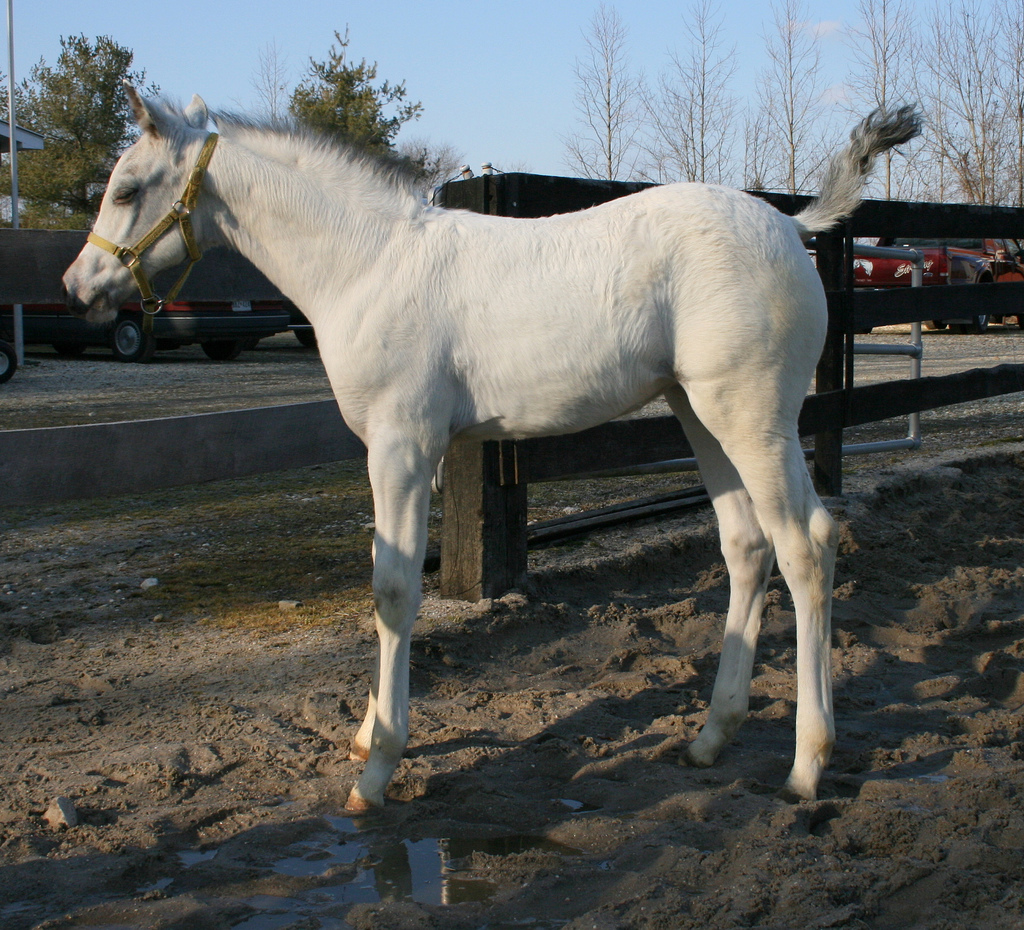
This "white-born" or "fewspot" Appaloosa foal has a mostly pink-skinned white coat.

The leopard complex, related to the Leopard (LP) gene, characterizes the Appaloosa and Knabstrupper breeds with their spotted coats. Leopard is genetically quite distinct from all other white and white-spotting patterns. The fewspot leopard pattern, however, can resemble white. Two factors influence the eventual appearance of a leopard complex coat: whether one copy (heterozygous LP/lp) or two copies (homozygous LP/LP) Leopard alleles are present, and the degree of dense white patterning present at birth. If a foal is homozygous for the LP allele and has extensive dense white patterning, they will appear nearly white at birth, and may continue to lighten with age. In other parts of the world, these horses are called "white born." "White born" foals are less common among Appaloosa horses than Knabstruppers or Norikers, as the extensive dense white patterning is favored for producing dramatic full leopards. Homozygous leopards have the LP/LP genotype, and may be varnish roan, fewspot leopard, or snowcap patterned. Homozygous leopards are substantially more prone to congenital stationary night blindness. Congenital stationary night blindness is present at birth and is characterized by impaired vision in dark conditions.

=== Lethal white syndrome ===
Lethal white syndrome is a genetic disorder linked to the frame overo (O) gene and most closely studied in the American Paint Horse. Affected foals are carried to term and at birth appear normal, though they have pink-skinned all-white or nearly-white coats and blue eyes. However, the colon of these foals cannot function due to the absence of nerve cells, and the condition cannot be treated. Foals with Lethal White Syndrome invariably die of colic within 72 hours, and are usually humanely euthanized. Carriers of the gene, who are healthy and normal, can be identified by a DNA test. While carriers often exhibit the "frame overo" pattern, this is not a dispositive trait and testing is necessary, as the pattern can appear in a minimal form as normal white markings or be masked by other white spotting genes.

== Horses that appear white, but are not ==
Genetically white horses have unpigmented pink skin (except where a horse with a W allele may have some darker pigmented areas) and unpigmented white hair, though eye color varies. The lack of pigment in the skin and hair is caused by the absence of pigment-producing cells called melanocytes. Some coat colors are characterized by light or white-like coats and even pinkish skin, however these white-like coats are not lacking melanocytes. Instead, white-like coat colors result from various changes in the ways melanocytes produce pigment.

=== Gray ===
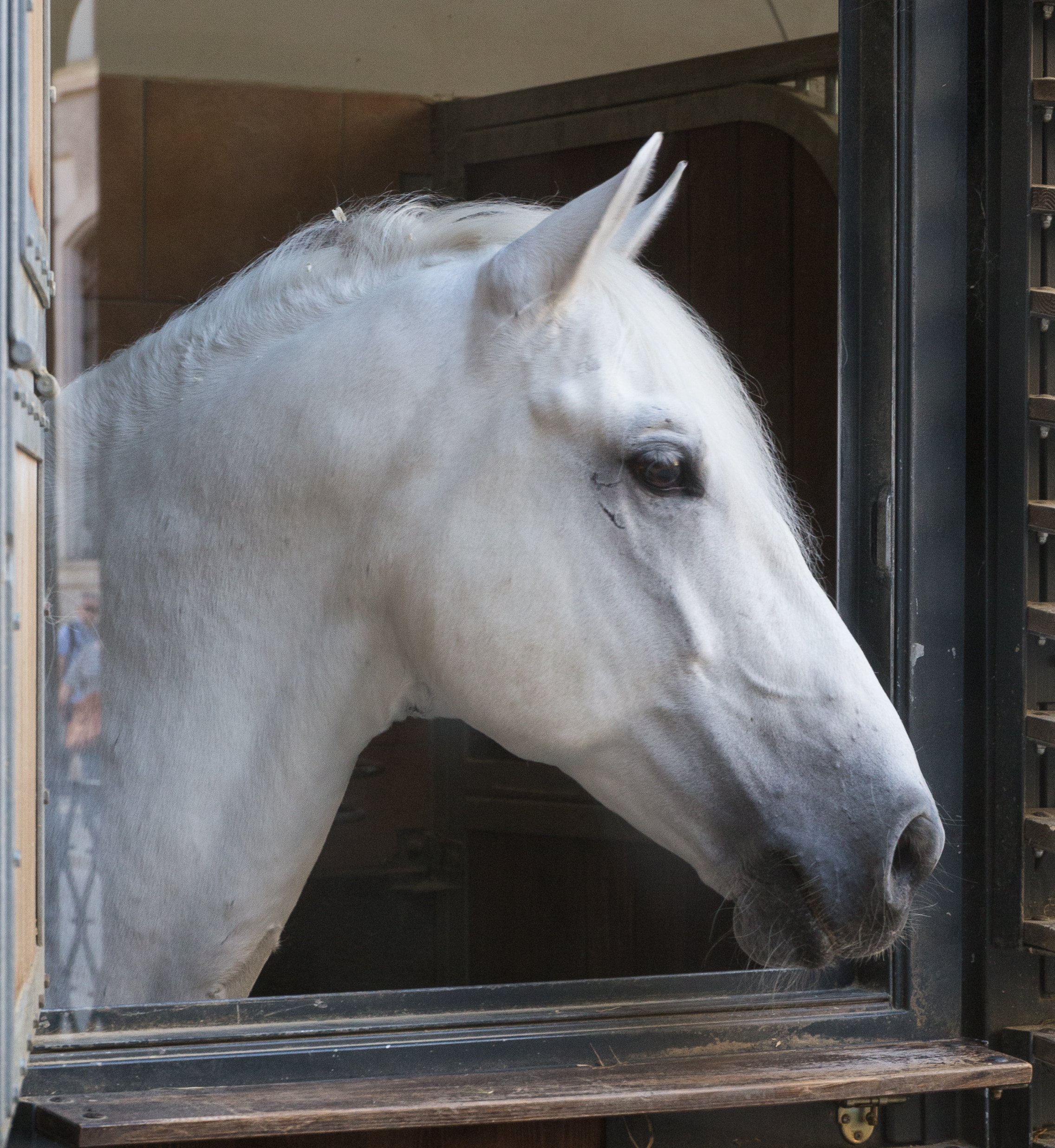
A gray horse—a completely white coat, but the underlying skin is black, as seen around the eye and muzzle

Gray horses have the most common "white-like" coat color. However, the most noticeable difference between a gray horse whose hair coat is completely white and a white horse is skin color: most gray horses have black skin and dark eyes, white horses have light, unpigmented skin. The gray gene does not affect skin or eye color, so grays typically have dark skin and eyes, as opposed to the unpigmented pink skin of true white horses. The skin and eyes may be other colors if influenced by other factors such as white markings, certain white spotting patterns or dilution genes. Gray foals may be born any color, but the colored hairs of their coat become progressively silvered as they age, eventually giving mature gray horses a white or nearly-white hair coat. Gray is controlled by a single dominant allele of a gene that regulates specific kinds of stem cells. Gray horses are at an increased risk for melanoma; 70-80% of gray horses over the age of 15 have a melanoma tumor.

=== Diluted coat colors ===
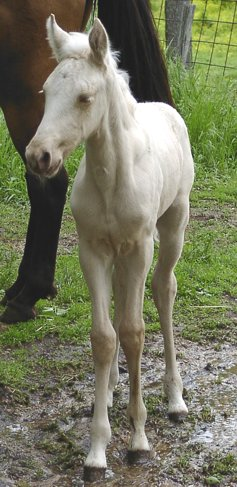
This "Ivory Champagne" foal has both cream dilution and champagne dilution genes, shown by DNA testing as well as visibly semi-pigmented, rosy skin and a cream-colored coat that can be mistaken for white. This same hair coat shade would be considered cremello if the horse had double cream dilution, but still would not be white.

True white hair is rooted in unpigmented skin that lacks melanocytes. In contrast, diluted coat colors have melanocytes, but vary due to the concentration or chemical structure of the pigments made by these pigment-producing cells, not the absence of the cells themselves. There are at least five known types of pigment dilution in horses, three which, as described below, can act to produce off-white phenotypes. Horses with strongly diluted coat colors usually have pale eyes (usually blue), cream-colored coats, and rosy-pink skin that contains a minimal amount of pigment. White markings are usually visible upon closer inspection.

- The Cream gene produces two types of diluted color. Horses with fully diluted colors, called Cremellos, perlinos, and smoky creams have rosy-pink skin, pale blue eyes, and cream-colored coats that can appear almost white. These coat colors, collectively called "double dilutes" or "blue-eyed creams", result when a horse is homozygous for the cream gene. The creme gene is an incomplete dominant, as when heterozygous, the dilution is less intense. In these cases, cream is responsible for palomino and buckskin. A few Palominos have a very light hair coat is occasionally mistaken for either cremello or white. White markings and patterns are visible against the slightly-pigmented coat and skin. The cream gene is not known to be associated with any health problems.
- Pearl-Cream pseudo-double dilute occurs when a horse has one cream gene and one pearl gene. These two distinct dilution factors interact to produce a cremello-like coat. Pearl-creams have pale but pigmented skin and blue-green eyes, and are distinctly pale cream-colored. To date, the Pearl gene has been found in Quarter Horses, Paint horses, and some Iberian horses. Pearl is not known to be associated with any health problems.
- Champagne-Cream pseudo-double dilute occurs when a horse has one cream gene and one champagne gene. Champagne and cream are another pair of unrelated dilution factors that interact to produce a cremello-like coat. Champagne-creams have freckled, pinkish skin, pale eyes, and pale coats. These colors were formerly referred to as "ivory champagnes". Champagne is found in North American breeds such as the American Cream Draft, Tennessee Walking Horse, American Saddlebred, American Quarter Horse, and Miniature horse. It is not known to be associated with any health problems.

== Albinism ==
Although white horses are sometimes called "albino" there are no recorded cases of a true "albino" horse. There are also references in literature calling white horses "albino". Dominant white in horses is caused by the absence of pigment cells (melanocytes), whereas albino animals have a normal distribution of melanocytes. In other animals, patches of unpigmented skin, hair, or eyes due to the lack of pigment cells (melanocytes) are called piebaldism, not albinism nor partial albinism.

All so-called "albino" horses have pigmented eyes, generally brown or blue. While true albino horses will have a pale blue or white eye. In contrast, many albino mammals, such as mice or rabbits, typically have a white hair coat, unpigmented skin and reddish eyes. The definition of "albinism" varies depending on whether humans, other mammals, or other vertebrates are being discussed.

Despite this, some registries still refer to "albino" horses. For example, the Paso Fino Horse Association registers cremellos and other cream colors as "albino." Until 1999, the American Quarter Horse Association (AQHA) described perlino or cremello horses as "albino" in rule 227(j). The AQHA later replaced the word "albino" with "cremello or perlino," and in 2002 the rule was removed entirely. Among Connemara pony breeders, homozygous creams are called "blue-eyed creams" or sometimes "pseudo-albino".

=== Comparisons to albinism in humans and other animals ===
The best-known type of albinism is OCA1A, which impairs tyrosinase production. In other mammals, the diagnosis of albinism is based on the impairment of tyrosinase production through defects in the Color (C) gene. Mice and other mammals without tyrosinase have unpigmented pink skin, unpigmented white hair, unpigmented reddish eyes, and some form of vision impairment. No mutations of the tyrosinase or C gene are known in horses.

Humans exhibit a wide range of pigmentation levels as a species. However, the diagnosis of albinism in humans is based on visual impairment, which has not been described in white horses. Vision problems are not associated with gray, dilute, or white coat colors in horses, and blue eyes in horses do not indicate poor vision. Eyes are pigmented at the front of the iris called the stroma, and in a thin layer at the back of the iris in tissue called the iris pigment epithelium. The iris pigment epithelium prevents damaging light scattering within the eye. Blue-eyed humans and mammals have little or no pigment in the stroma, but retain pigment in the iris pigment epithelium. If pigment is missing from both the stroma and the iris pigment epithelium, the only pigment in the eye is the hemoglobin in blood vessels. This accounts for the reddish appearance of eyes in some types of albinism.

In research mammals, such as mice, albinism is more strictly defined. Albino mice occur due to a recessive mutation of the C gene. No such mutation exists in horses. Albino mice lack pigment, but "...the inability of albino animals to produce pigment stems not from an absence of melanocytes...but from a deficiency and/or alteration of the structure of tyrosinase in melanocytes which are otherwise normal." This definition of albinism in mice – the inability to make tyrosinase – is extended to other mammals.

While mammals derive their pigments only from melanins, fish, reptiles and birds rely on a number of pigments apart from melanins: carotenoids, porphyrins, psittacofulvins, pterins, etc. Most commonly, reptiles with a condition homologous to human OCA1A retain their reddish and orangish hues. As a result, birds and reptiles without the ability to manufacture tyrosinase are more accurately described as "amelanistic." Horses do not have non-melanin pigments and so if they were albino, would have no pigmentation. The retained pigment of dilute horses, like cremellos, is not comparable to the retained pigment of amelanistic "albino" birds and reptiles.

=== Why cream is not albino ===
The cream gene, which is responsible for palomino, buckskin, and cremello coat colors, was mapped to the MATP gene in 2003 (now known as SLC45A2). This gene is sometimes called the OCA4 gene, because one mutation on SLC45A2 is associated with Oculocutaneous albinism type 4. However, other mutations in SLC45A2 are responsible for normal variations in skin, hair, and eye color in humans and . Although SLC45A2 is not the "albino gene"; one of many mutations of the human SLC45A2 is responsible for a form of albinism.

== Famous white horses ==
Many famous horses, past and present, were alleged to be "white" by observers, but were actually grays with hair coats turned fully white. Most white horses used in movies are also grays, in part because they are easier to find. However, there are a few truly white horses who were used in film. One of the best-known examples was "Silver", ridden by the Lone Ranger, a role actually played by two different white horses. At least one horse who played "Topper", ridden by Hopalong Cassidy, was also white.

Another famous white horse is Sodashi, a Japanese Thoroughbred racehorse who won Grade 1 races including Hanshin Juvenile Fillies, Oka Sho (Japanese 1,000 Guineas), and Victoria Mile.

== Mythology ==
Throughout history, white horses have been mythologized in many cultures. For example, Herodotus reported that white horses were held as sacred animals in the Achaemenid court of Xerxes the Great (ruled 486–465 BC), In more than one tradition, a white horse carries patron saints or the world saviour in the end times, including Hinduism, Christianity, and Islam.

== See also ==
- When a white horse is not a horse
- Whitehorse (disambiguation)
