= American Paint Horse Association =

American horse breed registry for Paint Horses

The American Paint Horse Association (APHA) is a breed registry for the American Paint Horse. It is currently headquartered in Fort Worth, Texas. It was founded in 1965 with the merging of two different color breed registries that had been formed to register pinto-colored horses of Quarter Horse bloodlines. One of these organizations was the American Paint Quarter Horse Association (or APQHA) and the other was the American Paint Stock Horse Association (or APSHA).

== History ==
The APQHA was formed in 1961 in Abilene, Texas, mainly to register cropout horses from the matings of registered Quarter Horses. They also allowed the registering of non-cropouts ("solids") who had Quarter Horse conformation and bloodlines. The APSHA was formed in February 1962. The APSHA registration rules differed from APQHA in that they excluded gaited horses and mandated that horses that were mainly dark colored must have a minimum of three white spots three inches wide on their body, and that mostly white horses must have a dark spot at least six inches wide on their body. Both registries agreed to merge in 1965, although the APHA calls the APSHA its forerunner.

== Coloration ==
The need for these registries arose because, in the days prior to DNA parentage testing, the American Quarter Horse Association (AQHA) would not register horses with excessive white markings, sometimes called "cropouts", thinking that such markings were a sign of non-purebred breeding and was maintained for several decades because it was also feared that excess white increased the risk of horses producing a foal with lethal white syndrome (LWS). This policy was known as the "white rule." (The AQHA also would not register Appaloosa, cremello or perlino horses for similar reasons.) This policy arose in part from long observation of the tobiano spotting pattern, which is a dominant gene, and was known to not occur unless one parent is tobiano, a color not recognized in the foundation breeds, such as the Thoroughbred, that were the predecessors of the American Quarter Horse.

What was not understood then is that the overo pattern, found in the Spanish mustang ancestors of the Quarter horse, and sabino pattern, which exists in the Arabian and Thoroughbred, occur as either a gene complex or a recessive gene; thus two solid-colored horses could produce a spotted foal if both were carriers. It is also known now that lethal white behaves like a recessive, and even two solid-colored horses can carry the LWS gene. Since the advent of DNA parentage testing and a test for LWS has also been developed, the AQHA has repealed its "white rule" and there are now Paint horses of verifiable Quarter Horse bloodlines that are cross-registered with both the APHA and the AQHA.

The APHA currently registers horses that exhibit the overo (which, under APHA categories, includes sabino), tobiano, and tovero spotting patterns, as well as solid colored horses with Paint bloodlines. It also keeps track of each horse's performance and progeny record. It allows registration of Paint to Paint breedings, as well as Paint to Quarter Horse and Paint to Thoroughbred. They allow live cover, artificial insemination, shipped cooled semen, frozen semen and embryo transfers.

== Programs ==
The APHA sanctions horse shows and holds an annual Youth World Championship Paint Horse Show in the early summer, and an annual Open and Amateur World Championship Paint Horse Show every November. They also offer racing and added money to Paint horses competing in open shows held by the National Snaffle Bit Association and the National Reining Horse Association.

The APHA also has programs such as PAC which is an open show program, in which Paint Horses are rewarded for their performance in other events such as show jumping which is not always included in the APHA hosted shows. They also have a trail program which records and rewards Paint horses and their owners for time spent in saddle pleasure riding or trail riding.
