= Lethal white syndrome =

Genetic disorder in horses

- Other names: overo lethal white syndrome (OLWS), lethal white overo (LWO), overo lethal white foal syndrome (OLWFS)
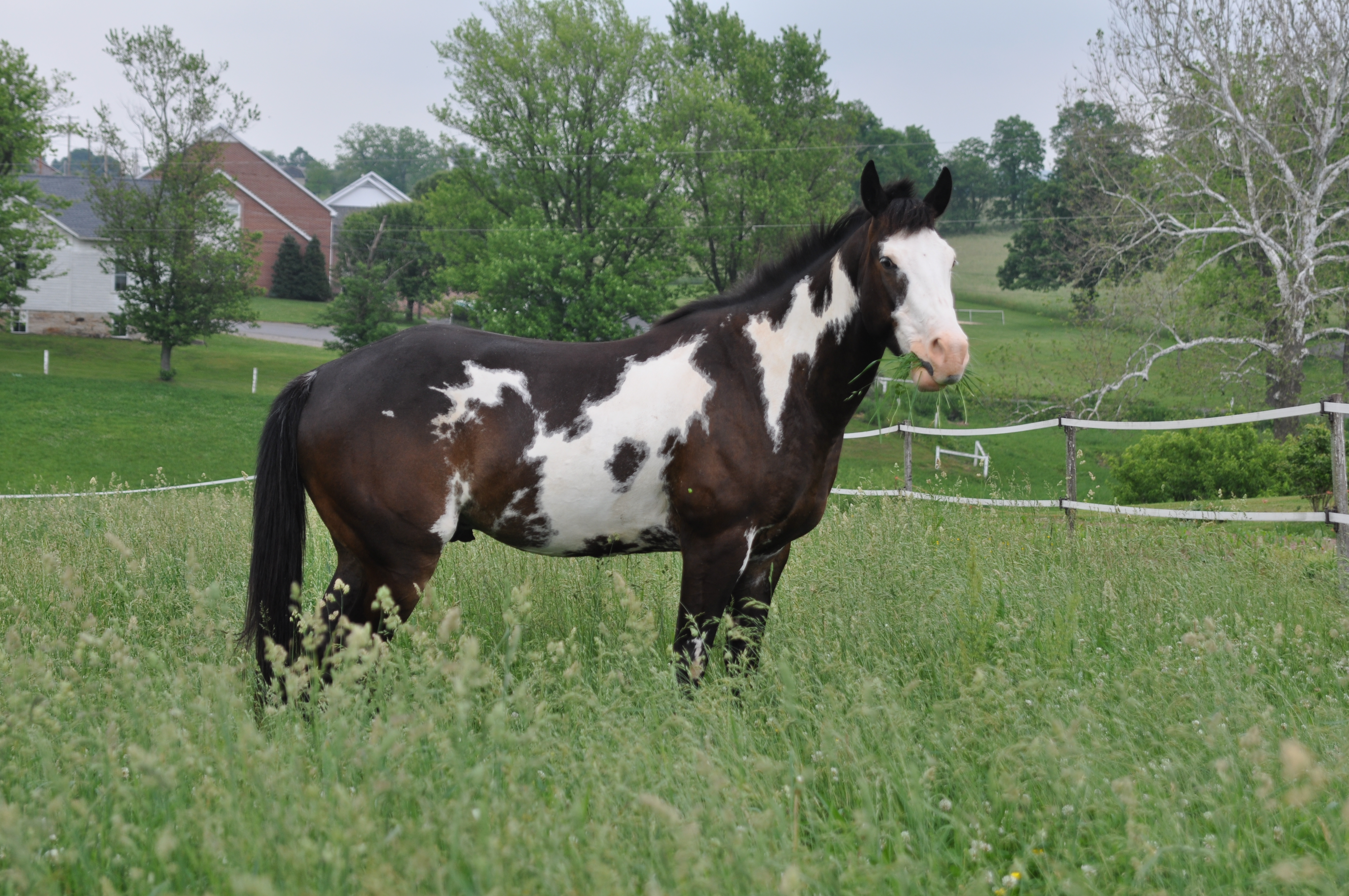
- Healthy horse exhibiting the frame overo pattern.
- Symptoms: Nonfunctioning colon, no meconium, colic, fatal within hours to days
- Usual onset: Birth
- Duration: Hours to days
- Causes: Homozygous for "frame" allele on endothelin receptor B (EDNRB); Ile to Lys substitution at codon 118.
- Risk factors: If both parents are heterozygotes for frame, there is a 25% probability of an affected LWS foal.
- Diagnostic method: Nearly all-white coat at birth, blue eyes, DNA testing, observation for colic, no meconium, pain
- Differential diagnosis: Heterozygotes have no known health issues related to the frame allele. Cremello, Dominant white and Sabino-white are normal white or near-white coat colors for healthy horses. Can be distinguished by genetic testing.
- Prevention: Avoid breeding heterozygous frame horses to each other
- Treatment: None

Lethal white syndrome (LWS), also called overo lethal white syndrome (OLWS), lethal white overo (LWO), and overo lethal white foal syndrome (OLWFS), is an autosomal genetic disorder most prevalent in the American Paint Horse. Affected foals are born after the full 11-month gestation and externally appear normal, though they have all-white or nearly all-white coats and blue eyes. However, internally, these foals have a nonfunctioning colon. Within a few hours, signs of colic appear; affected foals die within a few days. Because the death is often painful, such foals are often humanely euthanized once identified. The disease is particularly devastating because foals are born seemingly healthy after being carried to full term.

The disease has a similar cause to Hirschsprung's disease in humans. A mutation in the middle of the endothelin receptor type B (EDNRB) gene causes lethal white syndrome when homozygous. Carriers, which are heterozygous—that is, have one copy of the mutated allele, but themselves are healthy—can now be reliably identified with a DNA test. Both parents must be carriers of one copy of the LWS allele for an affected foal to be born.

Horses that are heterozygous for the gene that causes lethal white syndrome often exhibit a spotted coat color pattern commonly known as "frame" or "frame overo". Coat color alone does not always indicate the presence of LWS or carrier status, however. The frame pattern may be minimally expressed or masked by other spotting patterns. Also, different genetic mechanisms produce healthy white foals and have no connection to LWS, another reason for genetic testing of potential breeding stock. Some confusion also occurs because the term overo is used to describe a number of other non tobiano spotting patterns besides the frame pattern. Though no treatment or cure for LWS foals is known, a white foal without LWS that appears ill may have a treatable condition.

== Signs ==
Unlike the premature births and stillborn or weak foals of some coat color dilution lethals, foals born with lethal white syndrome appear to be fully formed and normal. The coat is entirely or almost entirely white with underlying unpigmented pink skin. If pigmented regions are present, they may be any color, and are most common around the muzzle, underside of the barrel, and the hindquarters or tail. The eyes are blue. A few lethal white foals have been shown to be deaf.

Healthy foals pass meconium, the first stool, soon after birth. Some healthy foals may require an enema to assist this process, but the meconium of LWS foals is impacted high in the intestine, and never appears, even with the use of enemas. Signs of colic begin to appear within the first day, and all foals with LWS die within the first few days of life. The painful and inevitable death that follows usually prompts veterinarians and owners to euthanize foals suspected of having lethal white syndrome.

Death is caused by an underdeveloped part of the digestive system. The large intestine of the horse comprises the cecum, the colon, and the rectum. Necropsies on LWS foals reveal a pale, underdeveloped colon and intestinal obstruction (impaction). Samples of affected tissue show a lack of nerves that allow the intestine to move material through the digestive system, a condition called intestinal agangliosis.

Closer examination of the skin and hair shows both to be unpigmented, and most hair follicles are inactive and many are devoid of hair altogether. All LWS foals test homozygous for a genetic abnormality.

== Inheritance and expression ==
Genetic conditions which affect more than one physical trait—in the case of lethal white syndrome, both pigment cells and enteric nerve cells—are termed pleiotropic. The unusual instance of pleiotropy in LWS foals suggested early on that the syndrome was related to an important section of embryonic tissue called the neural crest. As the name suggests, the stem cells of the neural crest are precursors to nerve cells. Another cell type that descends from neural crest cells are melanocytes, pigment-producing cells found in hair follicles and skin. The migration of nerve- and melanocyte-precursors from the top of the embryo to their eventual destinations is carefully controlled by regulatory genes.

Such regulatory genes include endothelin receptor type B (EDNRB). A mutation in the middle of the EDNRB gene, Ile118Lys, causes lethal white syndrome. In this mutation, a "typo" in the DNA mistakes isoleucine for lysine. The resulting EDNRB protein is unable to fulfill its role in the development of the embryo, limiting the migration of the melanocyte and enteric neuron precursors.

In the case of LWS, a single copy of the EDNRB mutation, the heterozygous state, produces an identifiable trait, but with a very different outcome from the homozygous state.

To produce a foal with LWS, both parents must be heterozygotes or carriers of the mutated gene. Without genetic testing, some carriers are misidentified as having white markings due to another gene, while some are even classified as solids.

The presence of this gene in a variety of horse populations in North America suggests that the mutation occurred in early American history, perhaps in a Spanish-type horse.

=== Heterozygotes ===
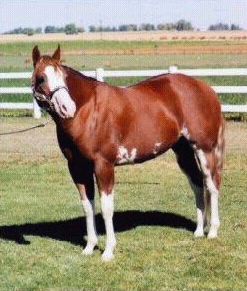
This horse has irregular white markings, and would be classed by the APHA and PtHA as "overo". However, his markings are caused by a type of sabino patterning and he has been DNA-tested negative for the OLWS gene.

Horses heterozygous for the Ile118Lys mutation on the equine EDNRB gene—carriers of lethal white syndrome—usually exhibit a white-spotting pattern called "frame", or "frame overo". Frame is characterized by jagged, sharply defined, horizontally oriented white patches that run along the horse's neck, shoulder, flank, and hindquarters. The frame pattern by itself does not produce white markings that cross the back, or affect the legs or tail. It does, however, often produce bald faces and blue eyes. The term "frame" describes the effect of viewing a frame-patterned horse from the side: the white markings appear to be "framed" by a dark-colored border. To date, animals which are heterozygous carriers do not exhibit health concerns associated with carrier-only status.

Not all horses with the heterozygous mutation exactly fit the standard visual description. A horse with the Ile118Lys mutation on EDNRB that is not readily identified as frame-patterned is called a cryptic frame. In addition to cryptic frames, a significant proportion of horses with the frame phenotype are visually misidentified, even in clinical settings. One study found from a group of visually inspected registered Paints, 18% of breeding stock solids and 35% of bald-faced horses were actually frames. However, over one-quarter of Paints registered in the "overo" category were not frames, and conversely, 10% of horses registered as tobiano also carried frame genetics. The difficulty in accurately identifying frames has contributed to the accidental breeding of LWS foals.

Minimally marked horses heterozygous for the Ile118Lys mutation are not uncommon: one DNA-tested Thoroughbred has white markings limited to a bottom-heavy blaze and two socks below the knee. A Quarter Horse mare tested positive for the gene after she and a frame Paint stallion produced a LWS foal; the mare's markings were a thin blaze with a disconnected white spot in the right nostril, with no other white markings. One major study identified two miniature horses that were completely unmarked, but were positive for the Ile118Lys gene.

Multiple theories are given for this. Variability in the percentage of individuals with a specific genotype that express an associated phenotype is called penetrance, and this may simply be evidence of variable penetrance. Several research groups have suggested that other, "suppressor" genes may limit the expression of frame-pattern white spotting.

On the other end of the spectrum, some white-spotted horses are so extensively marked that the character of the frame pattern is masked. In particular, the tobiano pattern, a dominant gene, is epistatic to overo. Other white-spotting genes include splashed white or "splash", sabino, and "calico". Any combination, or all, of these white-spotting genes can act together to produce horses with so much white that the presence of frame cannot be determined without a DNA test.

Ambiguous terminology has also contributed to the confusion surrounding this disease. Currently, the American Paint Horse Association categorizes horses as tobiano, solid, "overo", and tovero. The association breaks down "overo" into three categories: Frame, Splash and Sabino. In the past, "overo" was used even more loosely, to refer to spotted animals that were "Paint, but not tobiano". However, no fewer than four—and likely many more—genetically distinct patterns are included under the term "overo". To be categorized as "overo" by the APHA, a horse must fit a written description: white spotting does not cross the back, at least one solid-colored leg, solid tail, face markings, and irregular, scattered, or splashy white patches. To further complicate matters, various Sabino patterns also appear in some horse breeds that do not carry genetics for frame or any other spotting pattern.

Likewise, official classification of a horse as an unspotted solid is based not on genetic testing, but on a visual description. Horses carrying genetics for frame and other white-spotting patterns may be so minimally marked as to lack the registry's minimum requirements for white. This helps to account for allegedly solid horses producing spotted offspring, called cropouts.

The long-standing practice of categorizing Paint horses in this manner contributed to the incorporation of the word "overo" into some of the titles used to describe the disease, such as overo lethal white foal syndrome. However, "overo" refers to several genetically unrelated white-spotting patterns, and only the frame pattern is indicative of the syndrome. The confusion about the nature of LWS is then furthered by statements such as "there are many overos that do not carry the lethal allele", which is technically correct, but only because the term "overo" also encompasses splash and sabino patterns, as well as frame.

=== Homozygotes ===
Homozygotes for the Ile118Lys mutation on the equine endothelin receptor type B gene have lethal white syndrome. In any crossing of two carrier parents, the statistical probability of producing a solid-colored, living foal is 25%; a 50% chance exists for a frame-patterned, living foal; and a 25% chance exists of a LWS foal.

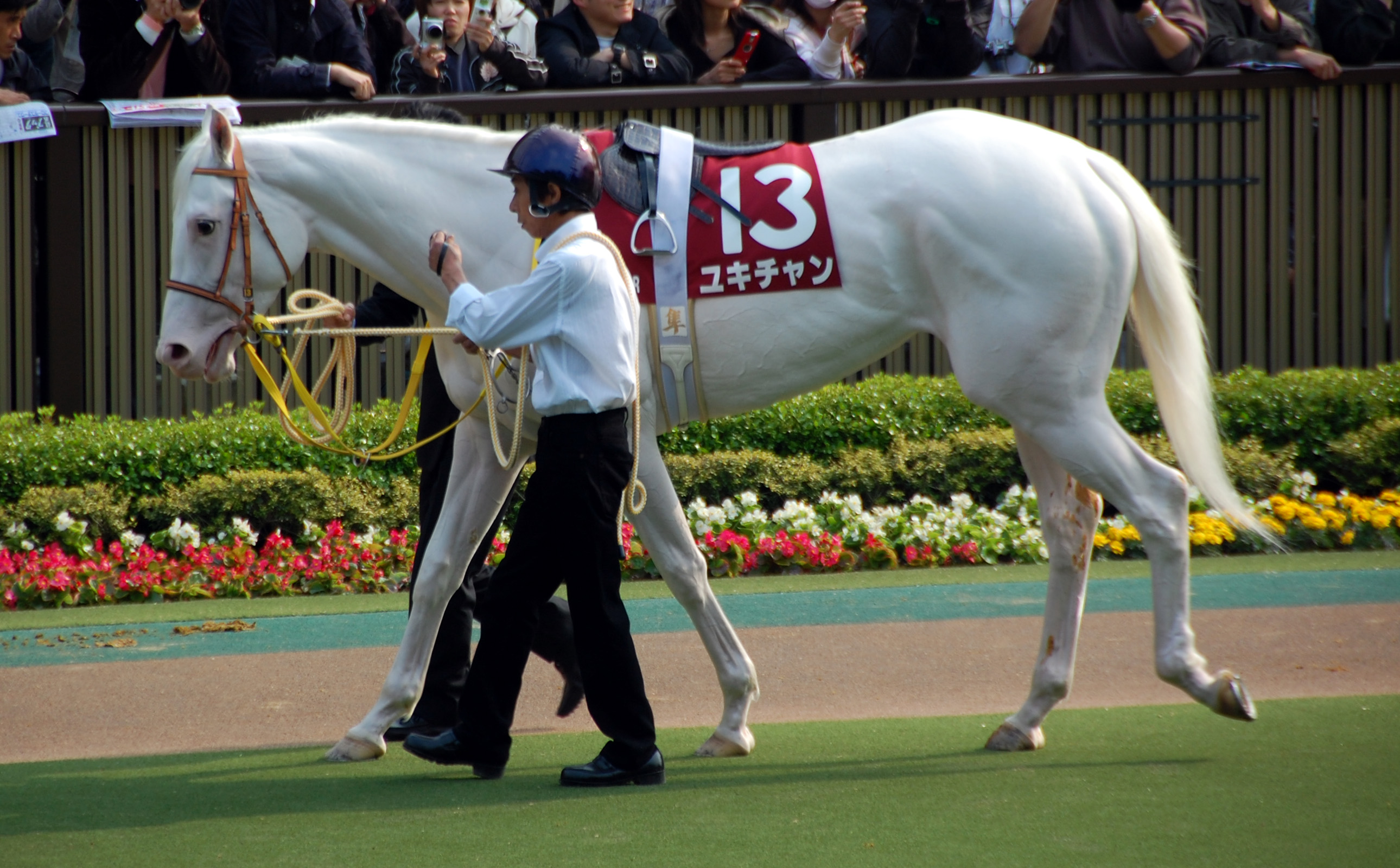
This Thoroughbred mare was born pure white with pink skin. Such foals are occasionally born with no apparent white ancestry. This mare does not carry the LWS gene, and her coat is termed "dominant white".

=== Producing frame color patterns without producing lethal white ===
Spotted coat colors, including frame, are popular and sought after by breeders. While many lethal white syndrome foals are accidentally produced when breeders cross two untested cryptic frames, or a known frame and a cryptic frame, some are produced by the intentional breeding of two known frames, whether out of ignorance or indifference. Producing a foal with LWS is now completely avoidable, because most major animal genetics labs now offer the DNA test for it. Whether a horse visually appears to have the frame pattern or not, testing horses of frame or "overo" lineage is highly recommended. The statistical likelihood of producing a living, frame-patterned foal by crossing two frames is 50%, the same odds of producing a living, frame-patterned foal from a frame-to-nonframe breeding which carries no risk of producing a lethal white syndrome foal. Therefore, breeding two frame overos conveys no benefit to breeders hoping to produce another frame overo.

=== Dominant or recessive? ===
Lethal white syndrome has been described by researchers as both dominantly and recessively inherited. Lethal white syndrome is described as recessive because heterozygotes (written Oo or N/O) are not affected by intestinal agangliosis. However, if the frame pattern trait is included, inheritance of the trait follows an incomplete dominant pattern. The concept of "recessive" and "dominant" antedate molecular biology and technically apply only to traits, not to genes themselves. In pleiotropic conditions, such as LWS, the application of "recessive" or "dominant" can be ambiguous.

A separate issue is the nomenclature applied to the frame pattern itself. While it follows a dominant pattern of inheritance, deviations occur. The majority of horses with the Ile118Lys mutation do exhibit the recognizable frame pattern, but a small percentage are too modestly marked to be classified as "spotted" by breed registries. Such "solid" horses, bred to a solid partner, can produce classically marked frames. The "crop-out" phenomenon can make frame appear to follow a recessive mode of inheritance.

== Prevalence ==
The gene for LWS is most common in the American Paint Horse, but occurs in any breed that may carry frame genetics, including American Quarter Horses, Appaloosas, Thoroughbreds, Morgan horses, miniature horses, Tennessee Walking Horses, and mustangs, as well as horses that are descended from these breeds. Only two Morgan horses have been identified as frame overos. Breeds that do not carry genes for the frame pattern also do not carry LWS.

== Lethal white mimics ==
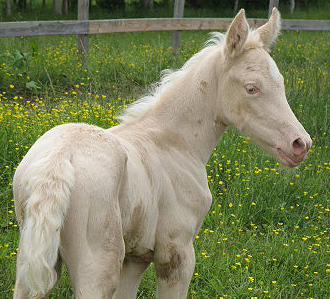
This blue-eyed, pink-skinned, whitish filly is, in fact, a cremello, and is healthy. Her skin is a rosier shade and her coat cream-colored, as opposed to stark white.

Not all white, blue-eyed foals are affected with LWS. Other genes can produce healthy pink-skinned, blue-eyed horses with a white or very light cream-colored coat. For a time, some of these completely white horses were called "living lethals", but this is a misnomer. Before reliable information and the DNA test were available to breeders, perfectly healthy, white-coated, blue-eyed foals were sometimes euthanized for fear they were lethal whites, an outcome which can be avoided today with testing and a better understanding of coat color genetics or even waiting 12 hours or so for the foal to develop clinical signs. The availability of testing also allows a breeder to determine if a white-coated, blue-eyed foal that becomes ill is an LWS foal that requires euthanasia or a non-LWS foal with a simple illness that may be successfully treated.

- Double-cream dilutes such as cremello, perlinos, and smoky creams, have cream-colored coats, blue eyes, and pink skin. The faint cream pigmentation of their coats can be distinguished from the unpigmented white markings and underlying unpigmented pink skin. A similar-looking "pseudo double dilute" can be produced with help from the pearl gene or "barlink factor" or the champagne gene.
- The combination of tobiano with other white-spotting patterns can produce white or nearly white horses, which may have blue eyes.
- Sabino horses that are homozygous for the sabino-1 (Sb-1) gene are often called "sabino-white", and are all- or nearly all-white. Not all sabino horses carry Sb-1.
- Dominant white genetics are not thoroughly understood, but are characterized by all- or nearly all-white coats.

== Analogous conditions ==
From very early in research into its genetics, LWS has been compared to Hirschsprung's disease in humans, which is also caused by mutations on the EDNRB gene. Various polymorphisms on this gene result in intestinal agangliosis, in some cases attended by unusual pigmentation of the skin and eyes, and deafness. The occasionally attendant pigmentation condition in humans is called Waardenburg-Shah syndrome.

The terms "piebald-lethal" and "spotting lethal" apply to similar conditions in mice and rats, respectively, both caused by mutations on the EDNRB gene. Only lethal in the homozygous state, the mutations are associated with white-spotted coats, deafness, and megacolon caused by intestinal agangliosis.

== See also ==
- Dilution gene
- Equine coat color genetics
