= American Paint Horse =

American breed of horse

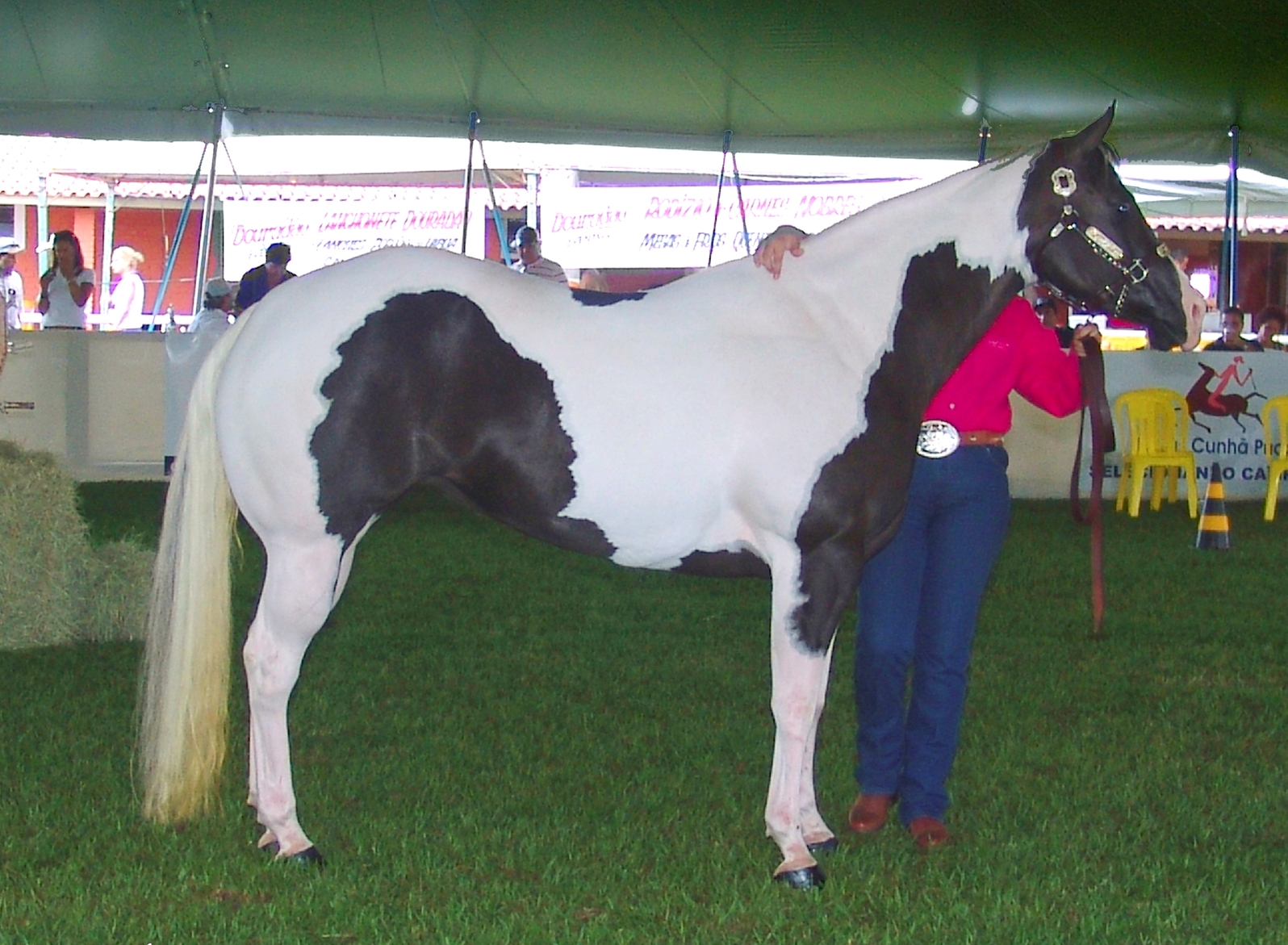
- American Paint Horse at show
- Other names: American Paint Horse
- Country of origin: United States

Traits
- Distinguishing features: Broad pinto spotting patterns of white and dark hair

Breed standards
- American Paint Horse Association

The American Paint Horse is a breed of horse that combines both the conformational characteristics of a western stock horse with a pinto spotting pattern of white and dark coat colors. Developed from a base of spotted horses with Quarter Horse and Thoroughbred bloodlines, the American Paint Horse Association (APHA) breed registry is now one of the largest in North America. The registry allows some non-spotted animals to be registered as "Solid Paint Bred" and considers the American Paint Horse to be a horse breed with distinct characteristics, not merely a color breed.

== Registration ==
The American Paint Horse's combination of color and conformation has made the American Paint Horse Association (APHA) the second-largest breed registry in the United States. While the colorful coat pattern is essential to the identity of the breed, American Paint Horses have strict bloodline requirements and a distinctive stock-horse body type. To be eligible for registry, a Paint's sire and dam must be registered with the American Paint Horse Association, the American Quarter Horse Association, or the Jockey Club (Thoroughbreds). At least one of the parents must be a registered American Paint Horse. There are two categories of registration, regular, for horses with color, and solid Paint-bred, for those without color.

=== Regular APHA registration ===
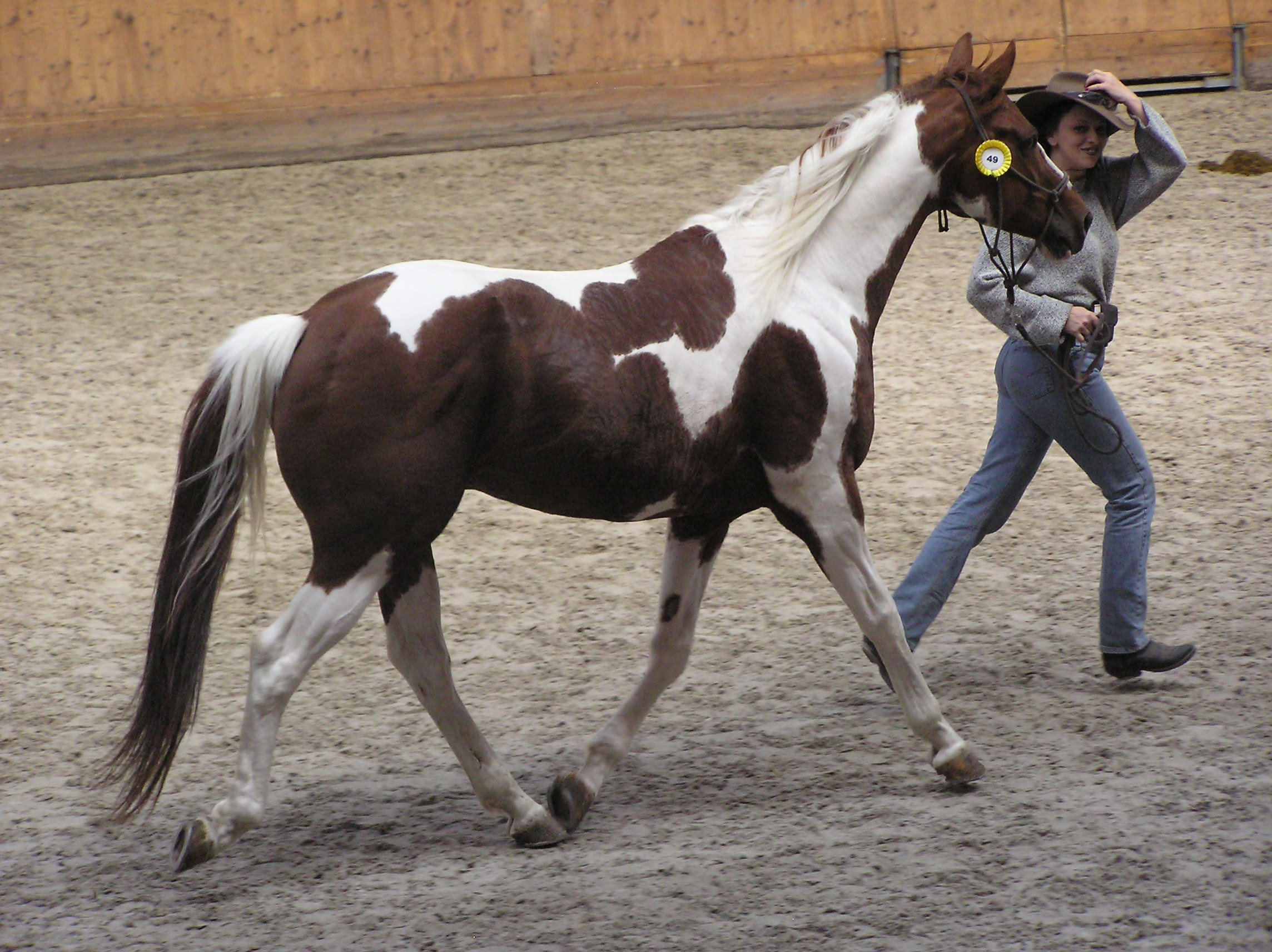
A regular registry Paint

In addition to bloodlines, to be eligible for the Regular Registry of the American Paint Horse Association (APHA), the horse must also exhibit a "natural paint marking", meaning either a predominant hair coat color with at least one contrasting area of solid white hair of the required size with some underlying unpigmented skin present on the horse at the time of its birth. Or, in the case of a predominantly white hair coat, at least one contrasting area of the required size of colored hair with some underlying pigmented skin present on the horse. Natural Paint markings usually must cover more than two inches and be located in certain designated areas of the body.

=== Solid Paint-Bred ===
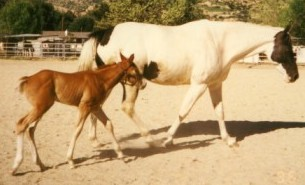
Solid Paint-bred foal. Sire was a sorrel and white tobiano, dam is a black and white tovero. Foal is a solid Chestnut.

Solid colored offspring of two registered Paint parents, called "Solid Paint-Breds" or "Breeding Stock Paints," are also eligible for registration, with certain restrictions. They are able to participate in some recognized Paint breed shows, and there are alternative programs offered, and many incentive programs within the registry are available to Solid Paint-bred horses. If a solid-colored horse is bred to a regular registry Paint horse, it is possible to produce a spotted foal. In some cases, such as the recessive sabino patterns, described below, even a solid colored horse may still carry genes for color. However, in the case of the dominant tobiano pattern, a Breeding Stock Paint will not carry these color genes, though it may retain other desirable traits.

== Color ==
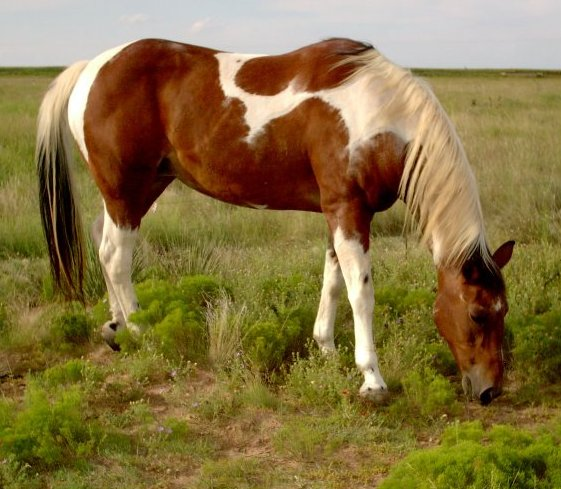
A tobiano Paint

Each Paint Horse has a particular combination of white and another color of the equine spectrum. Most common are horses with white spots combined with black, bay, brown, and chestnut or sorrel. Less common are horses with spot colors influenced by dilution genes such as palomino, buckskin, cremello, perlino, pearl or "Barlink factor", and champagne, various shades of roan, or various shades of dun, including grullo. Paints may also carry the gray gene and have spots that eventually fade to white hair, though retaining pigmented skin underneath the areas that were once dark.

Spots can be any shape or size, except leopard complex patterning, which is characteristic of the Appaloosa, and located virtually anywhere on the Paint's body. Although Paints come in a variety of colors with different markings and different underlying genetics, these are grouped into only four defined coat patterns: overo (includes frame, splash and sabino), tobiano and tovero and solid.

Breeding Stock Paints can sometimes showcase small color traits, particularly if they carry sabino genetics. Such traits include blue eyes, pink skin on lips and nostrils, roan spots, and minimal roaning.

=== Terms for color patterns defined ===
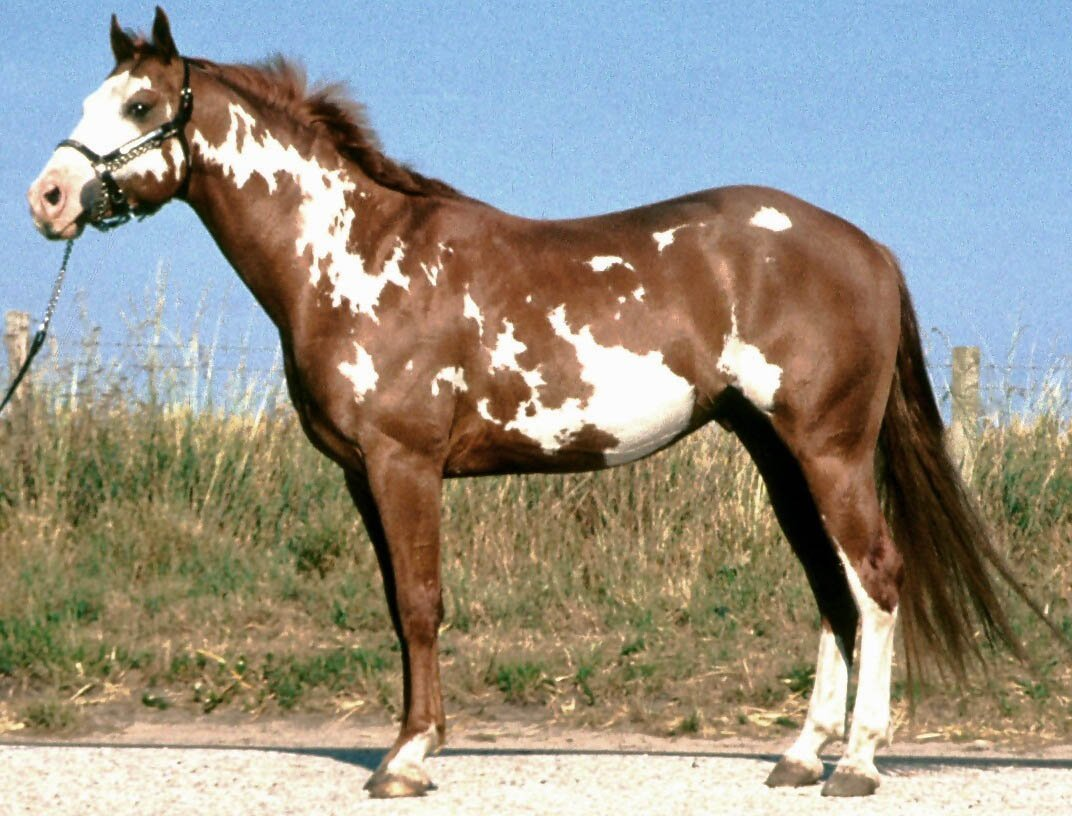
An Overo Paint

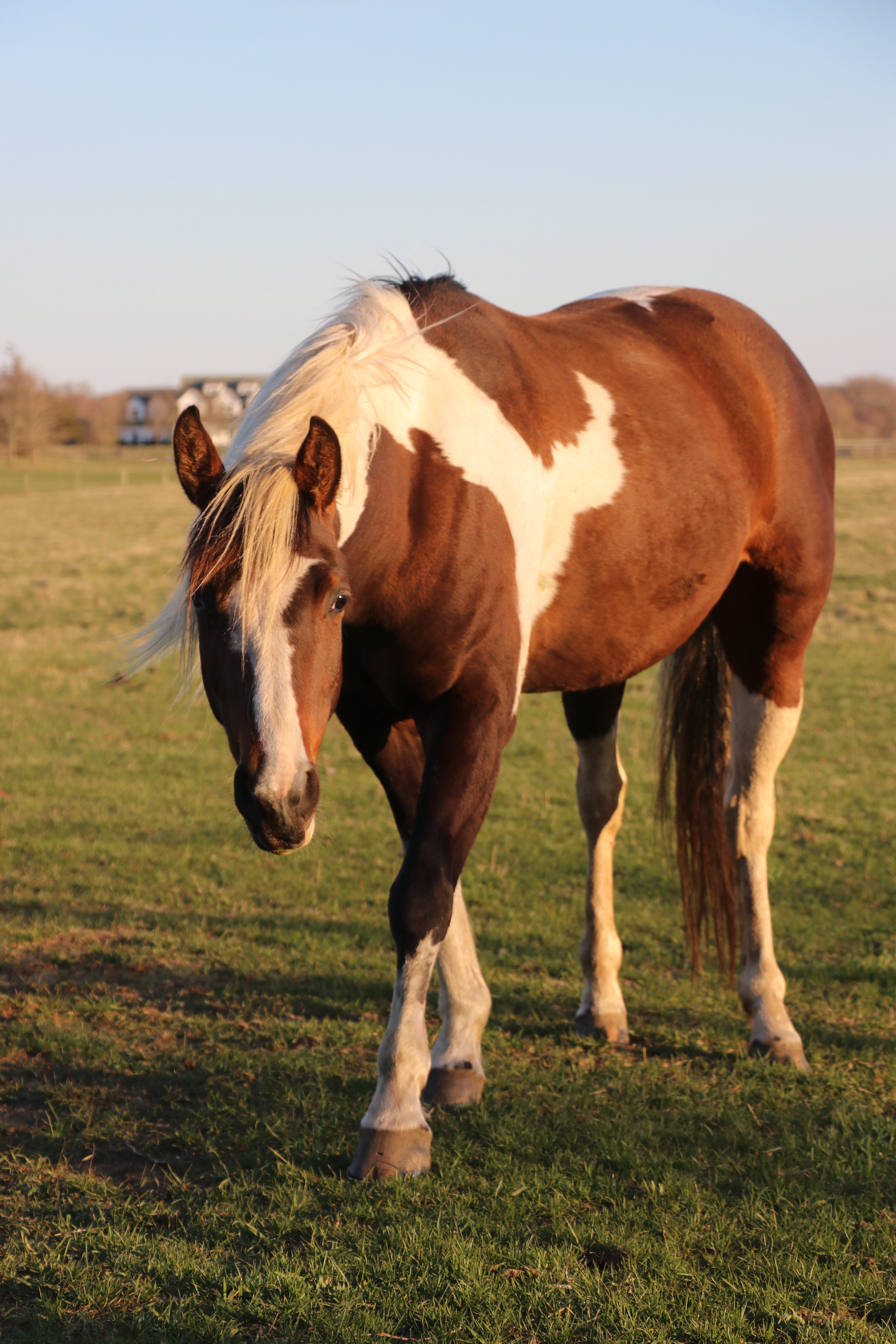
Horse in Montauk, New York

- Tobiano: The most common spotting pattern, characterized by rounded markings with white legs and white across the back between the withers and the dock of the tail, usually arranged in a roughly vertical pattern and more white than dark, with the head usually dark and with markings like that of a normal horse. i.e. star, snip, strip, or blaze.
- Overo: A group of spotting patterns characterized by sharp, irregular markings with a horizontal orientation, usually more dark than white, though the face is usually white, sometimes with blue eyes. The white rarely crosses the back, and the lower legs are normally dark. The APHA recognizes three overo patterns:
  - Frame: The most familiar overo pattern, the gene for frame has been genetically mapped and in the homozygous form, results in Lethal White Syndrome (LWS). Visually identified frames have no health defects connected to their color, and are characterized by ragged, sharp white patches on the sides of the body, leaving a "frame" of non-white color that typically includes the topline.
  - Sabino: Often confused with roan or rabicano, sabino is a slight spotting pattern characterized by high white on legs, belly spots, white markings on the face extending past the eyes and/or patches of roaning patterns standing alone or on the edges of white markings.
  - Splashed white: The least common spotting pattern, splashed whites typically have blue eyes and crisp, smooth, blocky white markings that almost always include the head and legs. The tail is often white or white-tipped, and body markings originate under the belly and extend "upwards".
- Tovero: spotting pattern that is a mix of tobiano and overo coloration, such as blue eyes on a dark head.
- Solid: A horse otherwise eligible for registration as a Paint that does not have any white that constitutes a recognized spotting pattern.
- "Color": An informal term meaning that the horse has a spotting pattern. (The opposite of "Solid.")
- "Chrome": An informal term of approval used in some geographic regions to describe a particularly flashy spotting pattern.
- Pintaloosa: An informal term used to describe the color of a horse that has been crossbred between an American Paint and an Appaloosa.

=== Paint or Pinto? ===
The terms paint and pinto are sometimes both used to describe paint horses. The breed is specifically called Paint, and pinto actually refers to the color.

== History ==
The American Paint Horse shares a common ancestry with the American Quarter Horse and the Thoroughbred. A registered Paint horse should conform to the same "stock horse" body type desired in Quarter Horses: a muscular animal that is heavy but not too tall, with a low center of gravity for maneuverability, and powerful hindquarters suitable for rapid acceleration and sprinting.

When the American Quarter Horse Association emerged in 1940 to preserve horses of the "stock" type, it excluded those with pinto coat patterns and "crop out" horses, those born with white body spots or white above the knees and hocks. Undeterred, fans of colorful stock horses formed a variety of organizations to preserve and promote Paint horses. In 1965 some of these groups merged to form the American Paint Horse Association.

== Uses ==
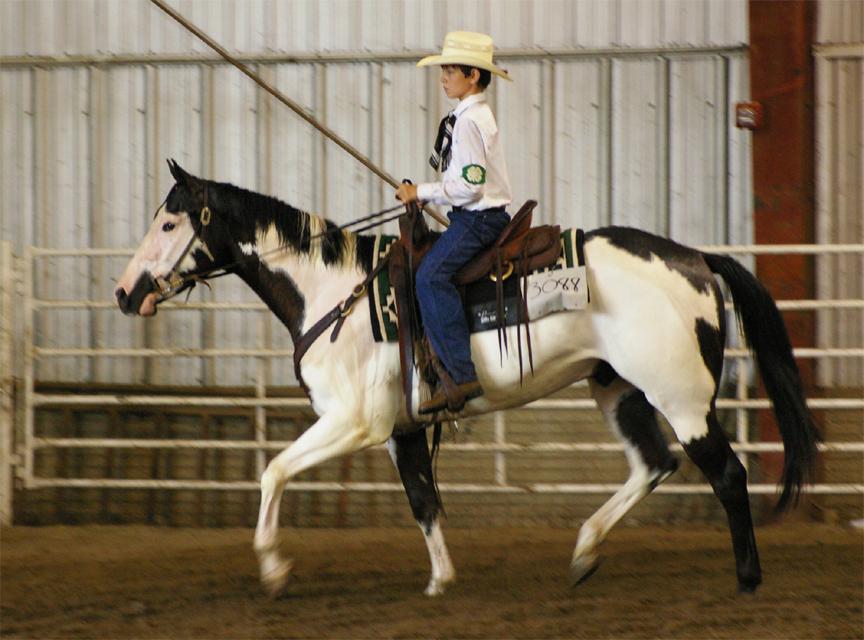
An overo Paint Horse exhibited in a Western riding discipline.

The Paint Horse is used in a variety of equestrian disciplines, most commonly Western pleasure, reining, barrel racing, and other Western events, although it is also ridden English in hunt seat or show jumping competition.

== Genetic problems ==
One medical issue associated with the breed is the genetic disease lethal white syndrome (LWS). Also called Overo lethal white syndrome (OLWS) or, less often, white foal syndrome (WFS), it is linked to a recessive gene associated with the frame overo pattern. Horses that are heterozygous carriers of the gene do not develop the condition and are physically healthy. However, when a foal is born that is homozygous for the LWS gene, it should be humanely euthanized shortly after birth, or else will die within a few days from complications involving an underdeveloped intestinal tract. A DNA test is available for LWS so that horses who are carriers of this gene are not bred to one another. Horses can carry the LWS gene and not visibly exhibit overo coloring; cases have appeared in the offspring of both tobiano and solid-colored parents, though all cases to date are horses that had overo ancestors. LWS is also not unique to Paint Horses; it can occur in any equine breed where the frame overo coat pattern is found.

Due to the heavy influx of American Quarter Horse breeding, some Paints may also carry genetic disorders such as hyperkalemic periodic paralysis (HYPP), hereditary equine regional dermal asthenia (HERDA), equine polysaccharide storage myopathy (called PSSM – polysaccharide storage myopathy – in Paints, Quarter Horses and Appaloosas), malignant hyperthermia (MH) and glycogen branching enzyme deficiency (GBED). The influence of Thoroughbred breeding puts some bloodlines at higher risk for Wobbler's syndrome.
