= Roan (color) =

Coat color found in many animals

Roan is a coat color found in many animals, including horses, cattle, antelope, cats and dogs. It is defined generally as an even mixture of white and pigmented hairs that do not "gray out" or fade as the animal ages. There are a variety of genetic conditions which produce the colors described as "roan" in various species.

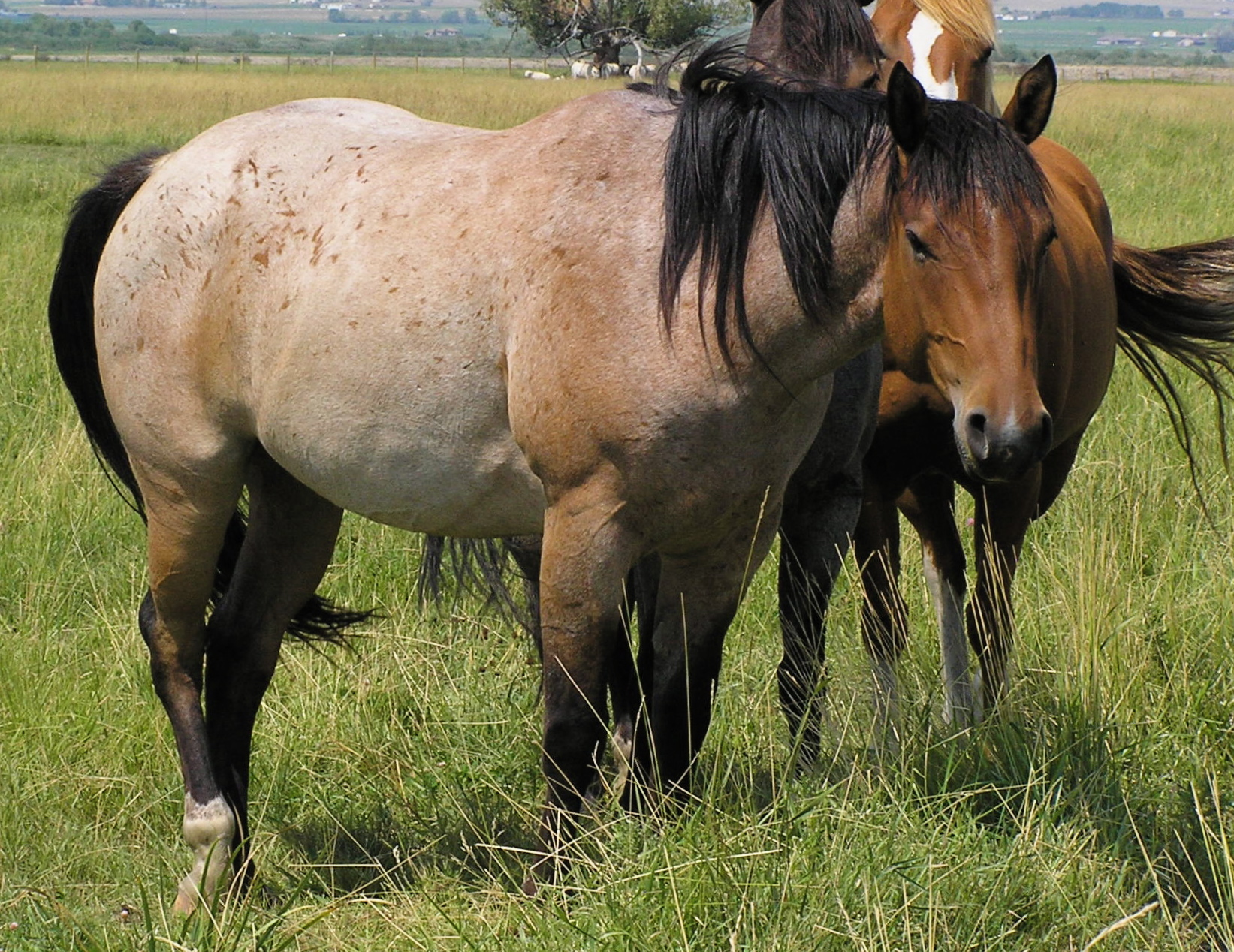
Bay Roan with corn marks

== Roan horses ==
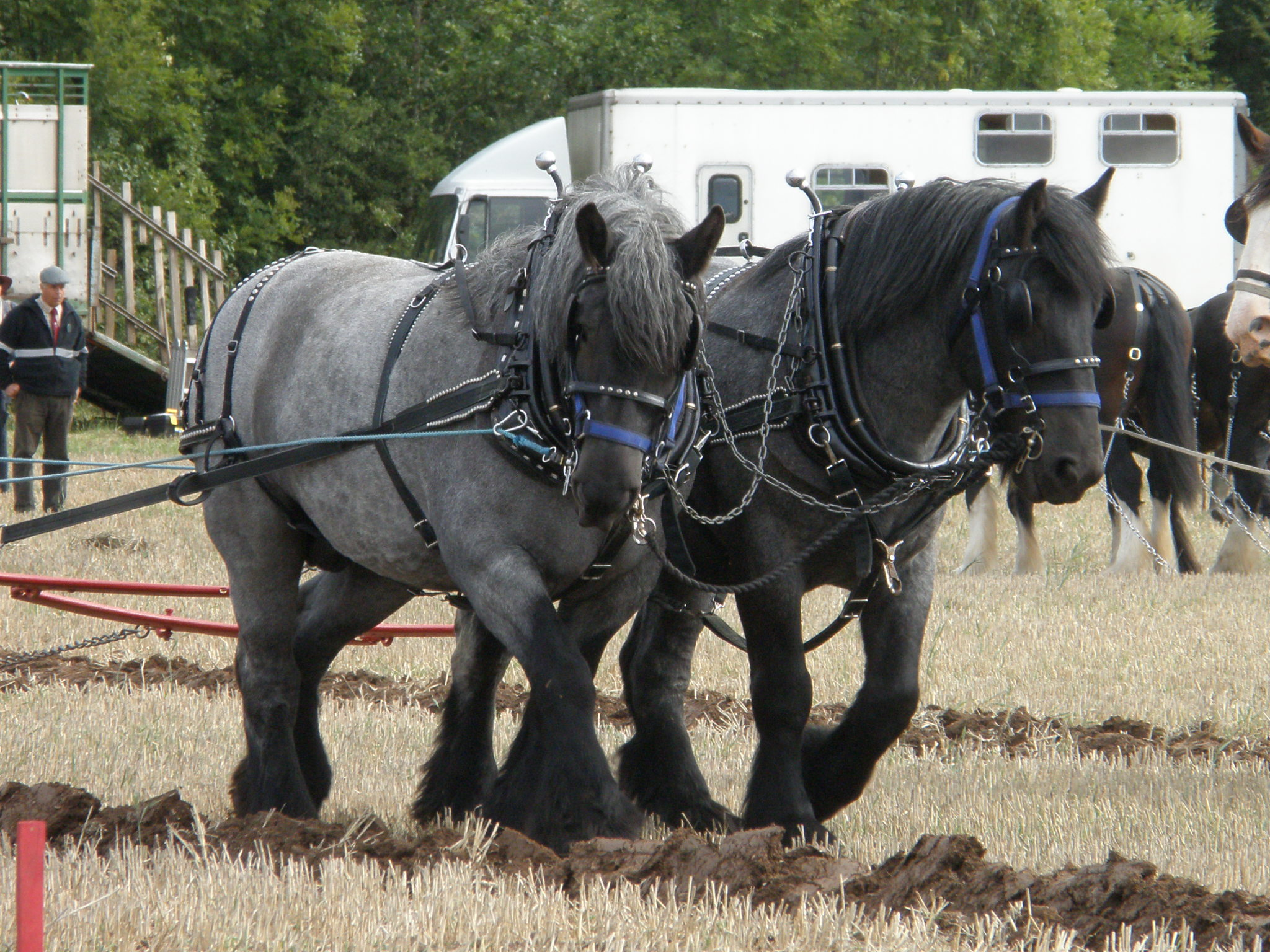
Two blue roans with white hairs intermingled with a black base coat.

A horse with intermixed white and colored hairs of any color is usually called a roan. However, such mixtures, which can appear superficially similar, are caused by a number of separate genetic factors. Identifiable types of roans include true or classic roan, varnish roan, and rabicano, though other currently unknown factors may be responsible for ambiguous "roaning". Gray horses, which become lighter as they age until their hair coat is nearly completely white, may be confused with roans when they are young. Duns, which are solid-colored horses affected by the dun dilution factor on their bodies but with darker points, are also sometimes confused with roans, but they do not have the intermixed white and colored hairs of a roan.

Horses with the classic or true roan pattern may be any base color which is intermingled with unpigmented white hairs on the body. Except for white markings under the control of other genes, the head, mane, tail, and lower legs are dark. Roan is a simple dominant trait symbolized by the Rn allele. The University of California, Davis School of Veterinary Medicine's genetics services have developed a DNA test that uses genetic markers to indirectly determine the number of Rn or rn alleles a horse has. The mutation responsible for true roan has not yet been identified exactly, but been assigned to equine chromosome 21 (ECA21) in the KIT sequence. The overall effect is that of a silver or lightened appearance to the affected part of the coat. Descriptions of roan coat colors are as follows:

- Strawberry roan describes true or classic roan on a chestnut base coat. The mane and tail remain red or have only a few white hairs, while the body ranges from nearly chestnut to pinkish. Geneticists prefer the term "chestnut roan," but this term is not in common use.
- Bay Roan is true roan on a bay coat. The particular shade depends on the underlying shade of bay; but the mane, tail, and lower legs are black, and the reddish body is intermingled with white hairs. The head is usually red. Formerly, bay roans were lumped together with chestnut roans and both called "red roans."
- Blue Roan is true roan on a black coat. The mane, tail, head, and legs remain black, while the body takes on a grayish or bluish appearance. Blue roans are sometimes mistaken for grays or grullos. However, Grays fade with age, while roans do not; and grullos are blue duns and possess dun markings but not intermingled white hairs.

Note 'red roan' is ambiguous and could mean either bay roan or strawberry roan.

Any other coat color may also be affected by roaning. Few combinations have the same unique terminology applied to the common roan colors, although palomino roans are sometimes called honey roans.

=== Roan mimics ===
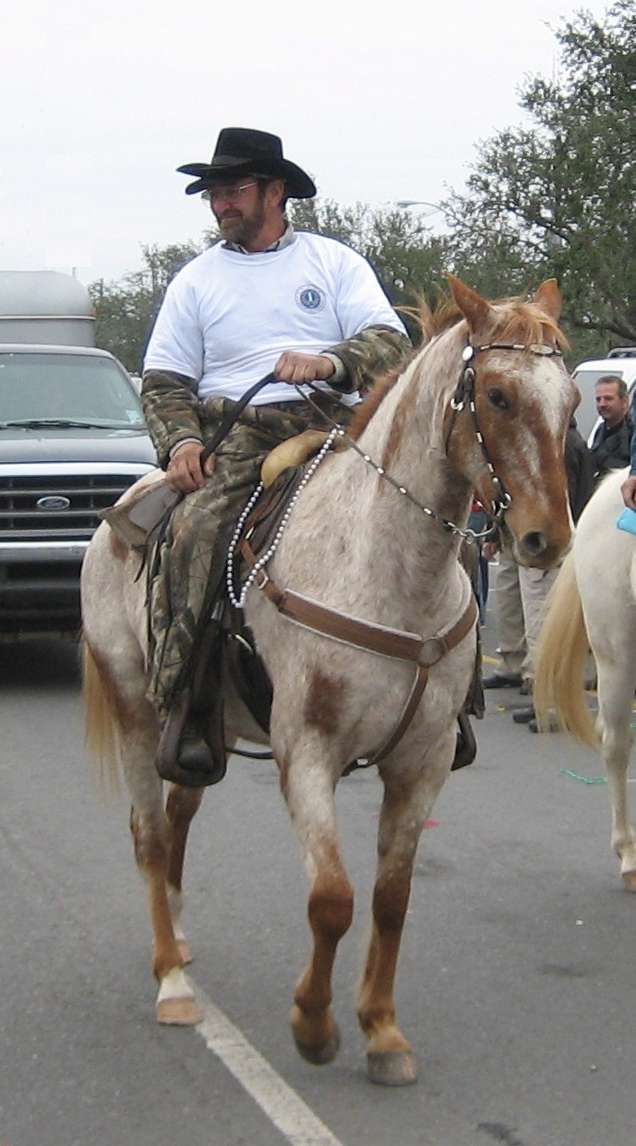
A varnish roan Appaloosa, showing white sclera, mottled skin, and darker bony regions such as the cheekbones.

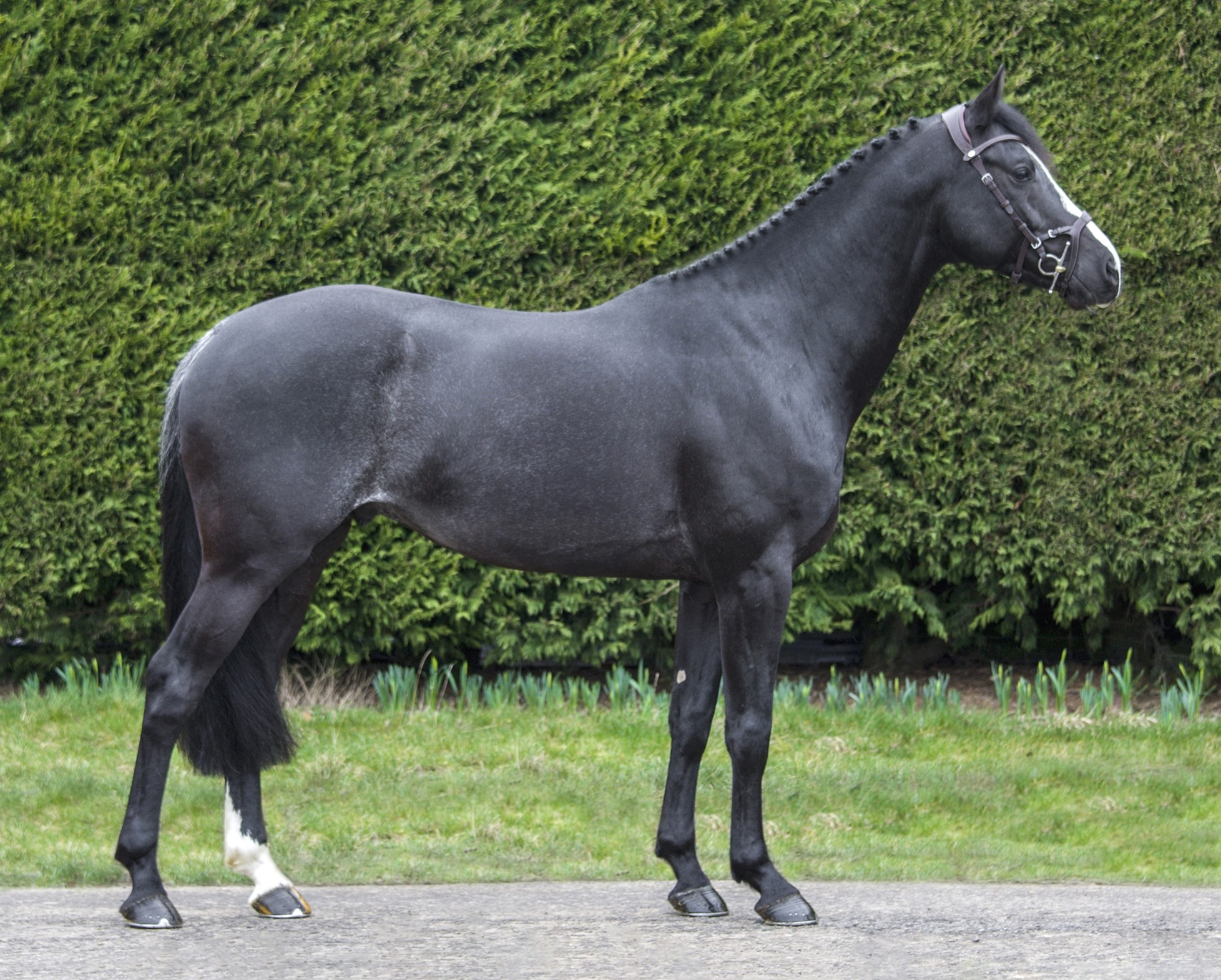
A black rabicano stallion showing classic ticking on flanks and a white Skunk tail (Photo courtesy of Koning Sport Horses)

A varnish roan is not a true roan; it is actually one of the leopard complex coat patterns associated with Appaloosa, Knabstrupper, Noriker horse and related breeds. Rabicano is a white pattern that falls into the category of roaning or scattered white hairs, the genetics of which are not yet fully understood. Sometimes called ticking, rabicano is common even in breeds that do not have true or classic roan, including Arabians and Thoroughbreds. This pattern usually takes the form of scattered white hairs around the junction of the stifle and flank, and peculiar rings of white hairs near the base of the tail. This trait is called a coon tail or skunk tail. Some forms of sabino, which is a pinto pattern, have roaning along the edges of other white spots or markings A roan horse may not fit into any of the traditional categories as there is much still to be learned about the genetics of roan. The existence of other types of roaning conditions not covered by those mentioned here is possible and likely.

== Roan dogs ==
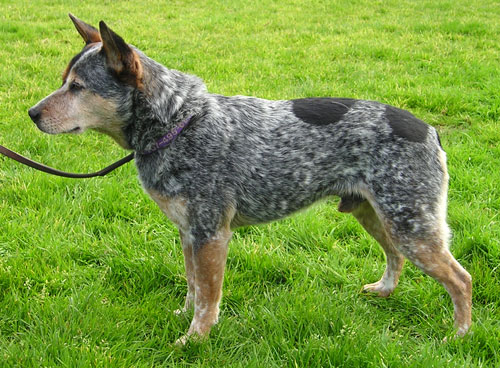
Australian Cattle dog

The genetics behind roan dogs are still unclear, and at present candidate genes have been ruled out. There remains a great deal of ambiguity in terminology regarding mottled dogs, which are called roan, ticked, mottled and belton depending on the context. The roan or ticked color is described in many breeds of gundogs such as English Cocker Spaniels, American Cocker Spaniels, English Springer Spaniels, Field Spaniels and Brittanys, German Longhaired Pointers, German Shorthaired Pointers, Bracchi Italiani, Spinoni Italiani, Lagotti Romagnoli, English Setters, Small Münsterländer as well as Border Collies and many other breeds.

In dogs, roan manifests itself only in unpigmented areas, the presence and shape of which are determined by other genes. This is in stark contrast to true roan horses and roan cattle, which are roan only in pigmented regions of their coat and may have white markings. Instead, dogs with roaning or ticking are born with clear, open white markings which begin to fill in with flecking in the subsequent weeks and continue to darken with age. Most breed standards use the terms "ticked" and "roan" interchangeably, with the former referring to clearly defined flecks on a white background and the latter to flecks so closely spaced that the mixture appears even.

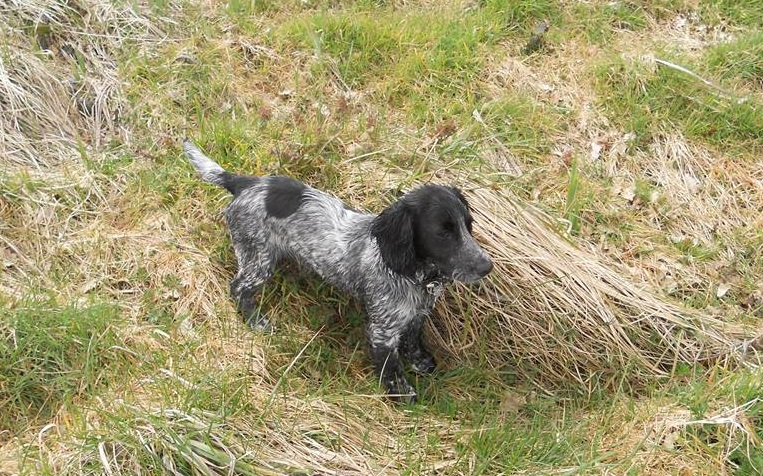
Blue roan English Cocker Spaniel puppy

The terminology that relates the underlying coat color with the roan modifier is often breed-specific, but most standards call a black dog with roaning blue. In breeds that are characterized by roaning and ticking such as the Large Munsterlander, clear white-marked individuals may be called plated. The term belton is reserved for English Setters.

In 1957, Little suggested that roan and ticking were controlled separately, and postulated that roan may have been homologous to "silvered" coat in mice. This condition in mice is actually homologous to merle, which might be described by some as "roan." In 2007, the gene responsible for roan cattle (KITLG) was refuted as a possible cause of roan in dogs. Neither roan nor ticking, if they are independently caused, appear to be recessive.

== Roan cattle ==
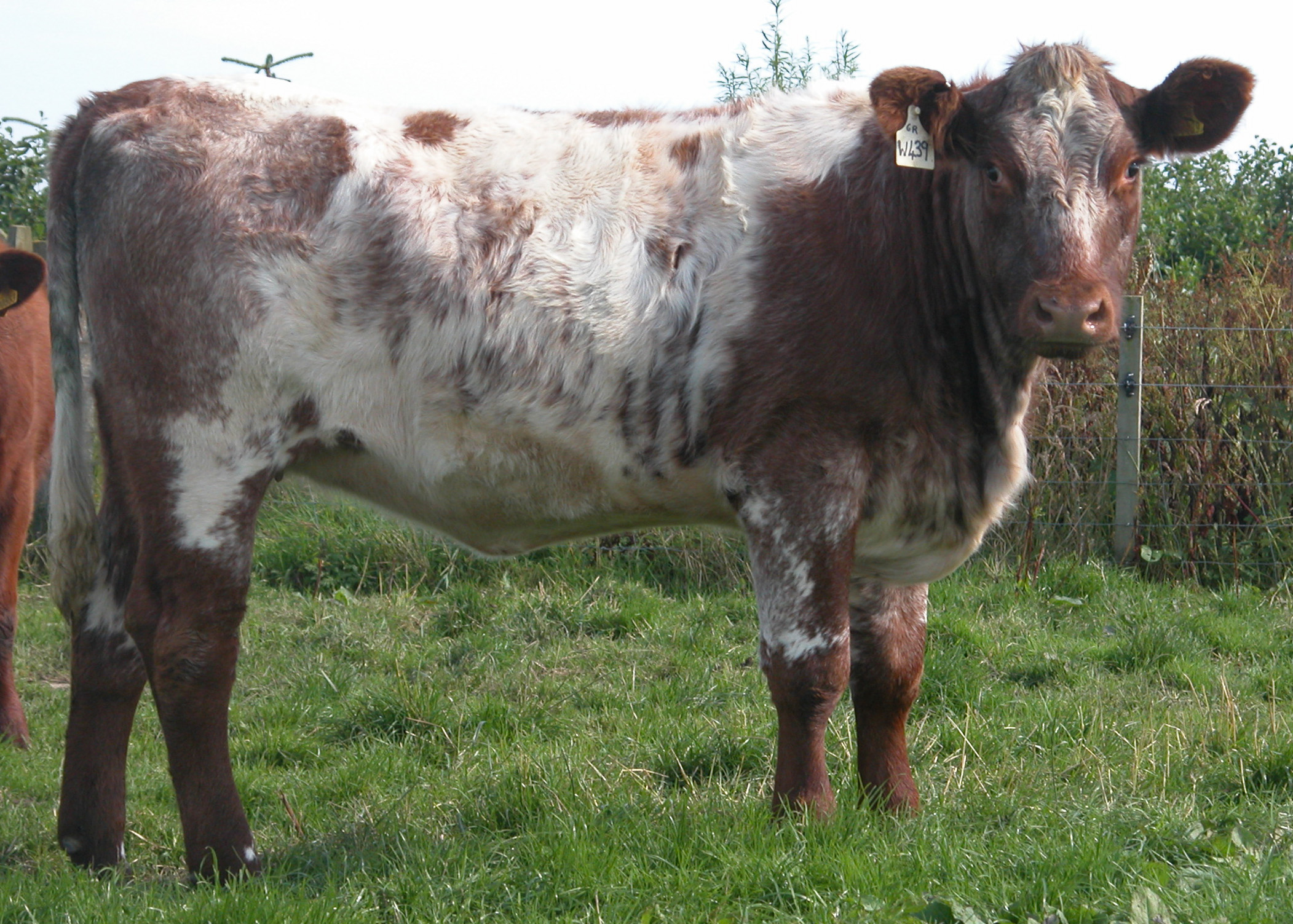
Red roan Shorthorn heifer

Breeds of cattle known for roans are the Belgian Blue and Shorthorn. Among the former, coat color may be solid black, solid white, or blue roan; the latter may be solid red, solid white, or red roan. Belgian Blues also typically exhibit spotting patterns, which are genetically separate from roan. As a result, most roan cows exhibit blotches of clearly colored and clearly white hair, with roan patches. Some "cryptic" roan cattle appear solid, but upon close inspection reveal a small roan patch. Roan cattle cannot "breed true" but breeding white cattle to a solid mate will always yield a roan calf. The white color typical of Charolais and White Park breeds is not related to roan.

Roan in Shorthorns and Belgian Blues is controlled by the mast cell growth factor (MGF) gene, also called the steel locus, on bovine chromosome 5. Part of the KIT ligand, this region is involved in many cell differentiation processes. Mast cell growth factor promotes pigment production by pigment cells, and without it, skin and hair cells lack pigment. With two functional MGF genes (homozygous dominant), cattle are fully pigmented; without any functional MGF genes (homozygous recessive), they are white. MGF-controlled roan occurs when cattle possess one functional and one non-functional MGF gene (heterozygous), resulting in a roughly even mixture of white regions and colored regions.

The reproductive condition "White Heifer Disease," associated with the MGF gene, is characterized by homozygous MGF-white heifers with incomplete reproductive tracts.

== Roan guinea pigs ==
The roan coloration of guinea pigs is linked to microphthalmia. The allele that controls roaning in guinea pigs is incompletely dominant: an animal with one copy of the allele will have varying amounts of white hair scattered through its coat, particularly on the back and sides.

About 25% of guinea pigs born to two roans are completely white, having two copies of the "roan" allele, and may have a constellation of deformities associated with "lethal white syndrome", although this condition has no relation to overo lethal white syndrome in horses or double merle syndrome in dogs. Lethal white guinea pigs ("lethals") often die shortly after birth or at weaning age, but with hand-feeding and regular dental care, lethals may live 2 to 3 years. Some lethals have reportedly lived to 6 or 7 years. It is worth noting that, unlike anophthalmic hamsters, guinea pigs with the condition are not sterile, but females may be unable to deliver live young.

Lethal white syndrome symptoms include:

- Partial or complete blindness
- Partial or complete deafness
- Microphthalmia or anophthalmia
- Unpigmented eyes
- Missing or deformed incisors
- Deformed molars
- Elongated tooth roots
- Malabsorption in the small intestine, due in some cases to lack of intestinal villi
- Increased susceptibility to illness

Roan coloration is not to be confused with the "magpie" coloration of guinea pigs, which is a brindle color lacking red pigment due to the "chinchilla" allele, an allele also responsible for self white and silver agouti coloration.

== See also ==
- Equine coat color
- Equine coat color genetics
