= Jayne Mansfield's leopard spot bikini =

Worn in publicity stunts

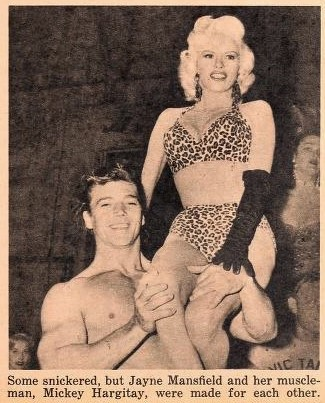
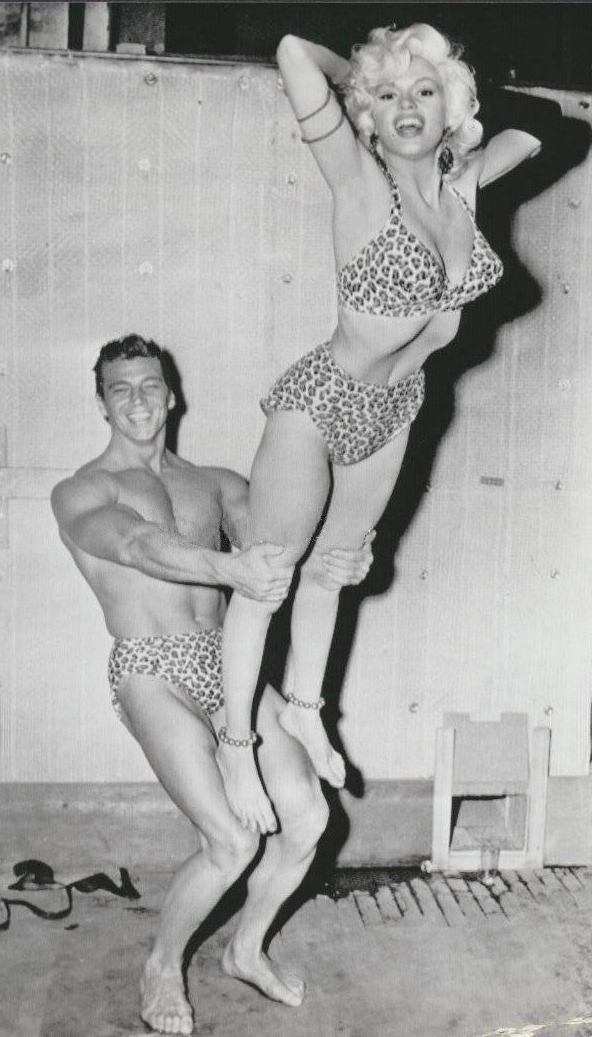
Jayne Mansfield wearing the bikini with Mickey Hargitay in 1955 and 1956

Jayne Mansfield's leopard spot bikini was a bikini with a leopard pattern commonly worn by actress Jayne Mansfield, particularly in her publicity stunts, earning her the nickname of "the girl in the leopard bikini".

During the late 1950s, she and her husband Mickey Hargitay posed for photos with her in the leopard spot bikini. The couple wore matching leopard spots to announce their closeness, and the costume won them a prize at a Hollywood costume party. Mansfield often walked down the Hollywood Boulevard in the leopard bikini signing autographs, once went shopping in the leopard bikini, and attended parties in it.

When Mansfield and Hargitay toured for stage shows, newspapers wrote that Mansfield convinced the rural population that she owned more bikinis than anyone. She showed a fair amount of her 40-inch (1,000 mm) bust, as well as her midriff and legs, in the leopard-spot bikini she wore for her stage shows. Kathryn Wexler of the Miami Herald wrote, "In the beginning as we know it, there was Jayne Mansfield. Here she preens in leopard-print or striped bikinis, sucking in air to showcase her well noted physical assets." The outfit remains one of the earlier specimens in the history of bikinis. As late as in 1982, she appeared in a full-page color photograph in the leopard spot bikini in Tony Crawley's Screen Dreams: The Hollywood Pin-up. American Photo magazine printed photographer Bruno Bernard's photo of Mansfield in the costume in 2003.

== Sources ==
- Strait, Raymond (1992). Here They Are Jayne Mansfield. New York: S.P.I. Books. ISBN 978-1-56171-146-8.
- Faris, Jocelyn (November 1994). Jayne Mansfield: A Bio-Bibliography. Westport, CT: Greenwood Press. ISBN 978-0-313-28544-8.
- Saxton, Martha (1975). Jayne Mansfield and the American Fifties. New York: Houghton Mifflin. ISBN 978-0-395-20289-0.
