= Frederiksborger =

Breed of horse

Frederiksborg
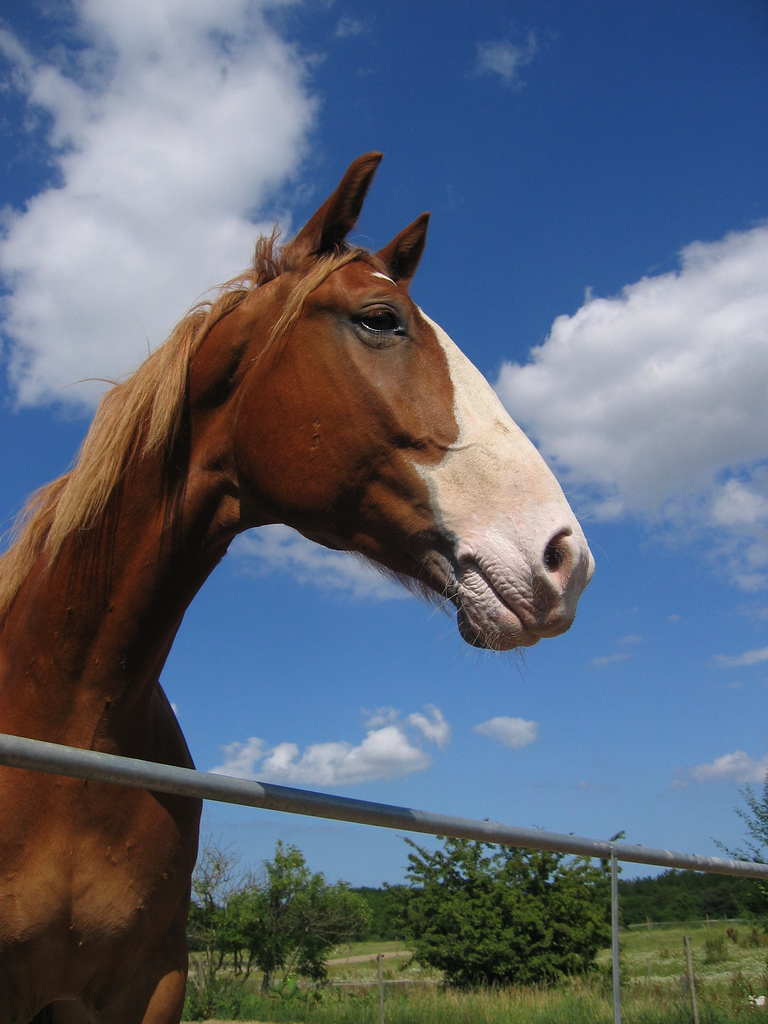
- This photo shows the extensive white markings and chestnut coloring typical of the breed.
- Conservation status: NordGen (2019): Endangered
- Other names: Frederiksborger, Fredriksborg
- Country of origin: Denmark

Traits
- Height: 160–168 cm (approx. 15.3–16.2 hands)
- Color: any solid color (usually chestnut)

Breed standards
- Frederiksborg Hesteavlsforeningen (FHF)

The Frederiksborger is Denmark's oldest horse breed, dating back to 1562. They were tremendously popular throughout the Renaissance and Baroque periods, and were considered status symbols in many European countries. Today, the breed is endangered, but has a loyal following. Stallions and mares undergo studbook inspections with the breed association before being allowed to breed. They are most often chestnut with white markings, but can be any solid color.

Spotted horses of Frederiksborger descent are registered as Knabstruppers instead, while solid horses of Frederiksborger descent mixed with other breeds are known as Danish Warmbloods.

== Characteristics ==
Today, the numbers of Frederiksborgers are low, but the remaining examples are handsome horses. They are most often vividly marked flaxen chestnuts, though bays, buckskins, palominos, and greys are seen as well. They usually have sabino-type markings, and many have rabicano roaning; all white markings are accepted.

In conformation and type, the Frederiksborger was "ahead of its time", so the horses express great quality and are quite uniform. The muzzle is wide, and the straight lines of the head often border on convex. The neck is powerful and usually crested, and is set high on strong shoulders. The withers are not high, and the back, while long, has a strong loin. The hindquarters are broad and deep and the croup is level. The level topline and high-set neck of the Frederiksborger belie its showy trot. The legs are solid and square, a little more than half the horse's height. The tail is well-carried.

Frederiksborgers are early-maturing, long-lived, and sound reproductively and structurally well into their old age. The greatest concern facing the health of the Frederiksborger is inbreeding due to a limited gene pool and a closed studbook. However, studbook inspections are intended to safeguard the breed against weakness, as well as maintain the original type; a horse with a known genetic disorder is not approved to breed.

== History ==
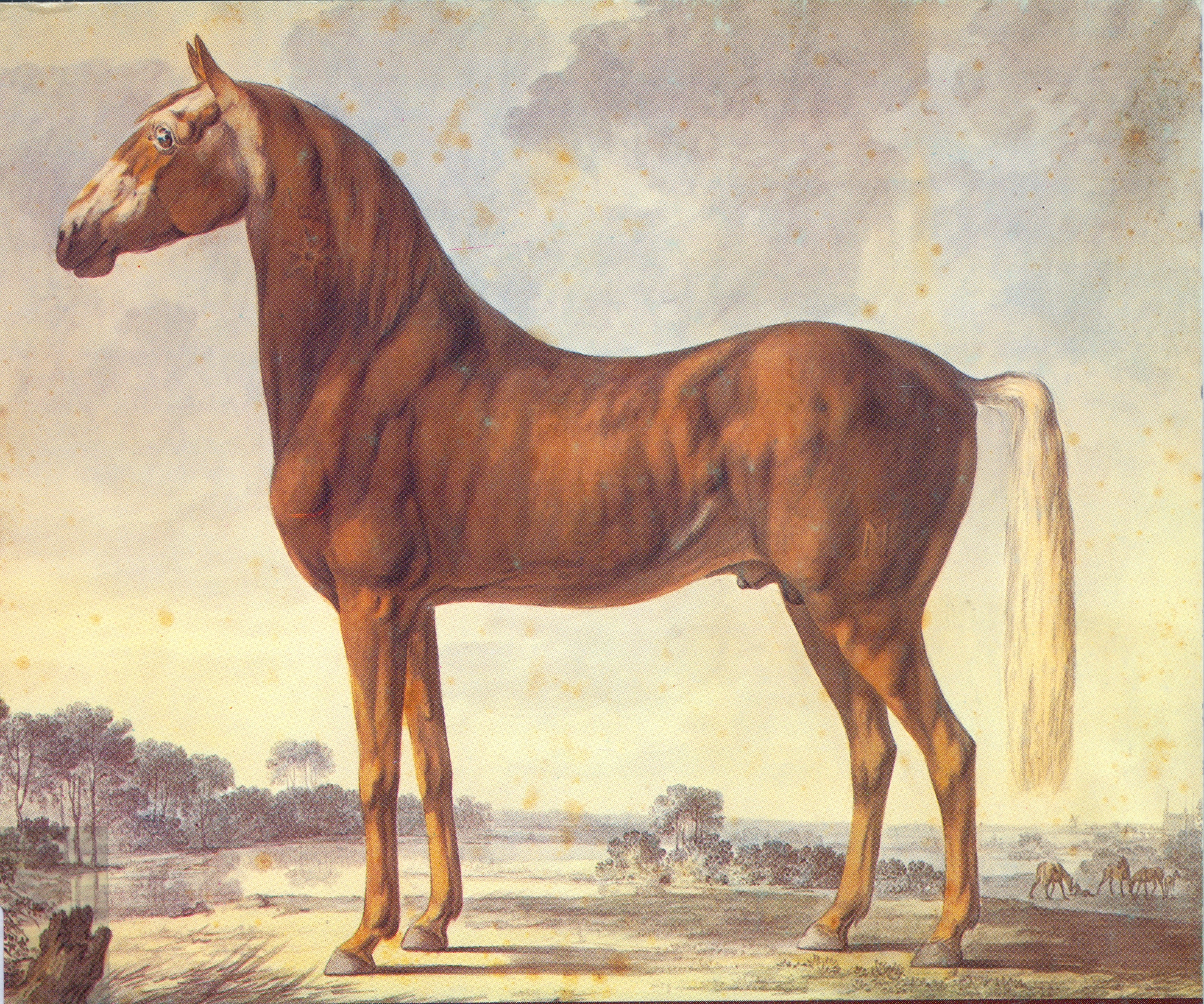
The stallion "Bæveren III" of the Frederiksborg royal stud, painted in 1805. Bæveren III's line led to Bæveren 6 by Stærkodder, one of the oldest sire lines, descending from the Spanish stallion Superbe (b. 1683). The Bæveren sire line is estimated to have fully died out by around 1900.

Prior to the foundation of the Royal Frederiksborg Stud, the stud farm at Esrum Abbey in northern Zeeland was well-renowned for centuries in Denmark and other European countries. This included the Kingdom of England, with a 2024 genetic study indicating some horses in medieval London had been imported from Denmark, possibly as gifts from Erik of Pomerania after his marriage to Philippa of England in 1406.

At the time, the stud at Esrum imported East Friesian and Iberian horses from Friesland and Spain, interbreeding them with native Danish horses to produce a combination of muscle and speed. In 1184, the Cistercians, whose main source of income was the stud farm, received special permission from Pope Lucius III to sell their horses if the proceeds were sent to Citeux in France, from where it was redistributed to newer and less wealthy monasteries. In 1536, during the Protestant Reformation, King Christian III took control of the stud at Esrum, and moved its horses to Hillerød (Frederiksborg), north of Copenhagen, the capital of Denmark.

The Royal Frederiksborg Stud was founded in 1562 under King Frederik II, who populated it with the Neapolitan horse and the Iberian forerunners of the Andalusian horse, with one named horse being the black Spanish stallion Superbe (b. 1683), an important maternal line sire. As the Norfolk Roadster and Arab-bred horses gained popularity later on, they, too, were selected to stand at the royal stud. As a courtly mount, the Frederiksborg had to be agile and trainable for the courtiers' pursuits in haute ecole and warfare, stylish and high-stepping for parades and court ceremonies, and strong and uniform in appearance to trot before the royal carriages.

By the 18th century, the Frederiksborger enjoyed such fame that the Danes began to export them in great numbers. They contributed to the formation of the heavy warmbloods, but also to the Lipizzaner. A grey Frederiksborger stallion born in 1765, Pluto, stood at the stud in Lipica. From 1812 to the 1830s, Frederiksborgers were used as foundation stock for the Knabstrupper horse breed at Knabstrup Manor, with the main foundation mare, Flæbehoppen, being bred to a Frederiksborger stallion. Their son was Flæbehingsten (b. 1813).

The popularity of the breed took its toll, and in 1839, the royal stud was closed. The breeding of Frederiksborgers continued with private breeders, though the needs of the people reshaped the horse to some degree. Instead of a luxury item, the horses were redirected to be more suitable for the stagecoach and agricultural work. In 1939, efforts to re-establish the breed were started, adding East Friesian, Oldenburgs, Thoroughbreds, Anglo-Arabians, and Arabians later. The modern Danish Warmblood often traces back to the Frederiksborger through the female lines, though the pedigrees of these horses are mostly German in origin.

Nevertheless, as the Danish breeders made use of German and Swedish horses, some part-Frederiksborger mares made their way back into the breeding population, similarly to the Holsteiner Manfreid (Markgraf), Swedish Rousseau (Herzog), and the Hanoverians Atlantic (Abglanz), Ergo (Abendjaeger), and Boheme (Bolero). Otherwise, the Frederiksborger has been purebred for the past century, which accounts for their uniform type.

Frederiksborger breeders, through crosses to Thoroughbred stallions, introduced the Byerley Turk sire line to the breed through Pegasus, by "Logic XX", imported to stand at the Royal Stud in Denmark by Christian Augustus II, Duke of Schleswig-Holstein-Sonderburg-Augustenburg in the early 1800s. The Duke also served as an advisor on the breeding of Holsteiner horses, and imported the Thoroughbred stallion Protocol (b. 1828) to Germany. The last Frederiksborger horse with the Pegasus sire line was born in 1948, with only two sire lines remaining.

== Uses ==
Frederiksborgers are best in harness and compete up to the international levels of combined driving. They are also suitable horses for amateurs, as they are not selected for sensitivity. Some individuals are successful in competitive dressage and show jumping, as well.
