= Varnish roan =

Horse coat coloration

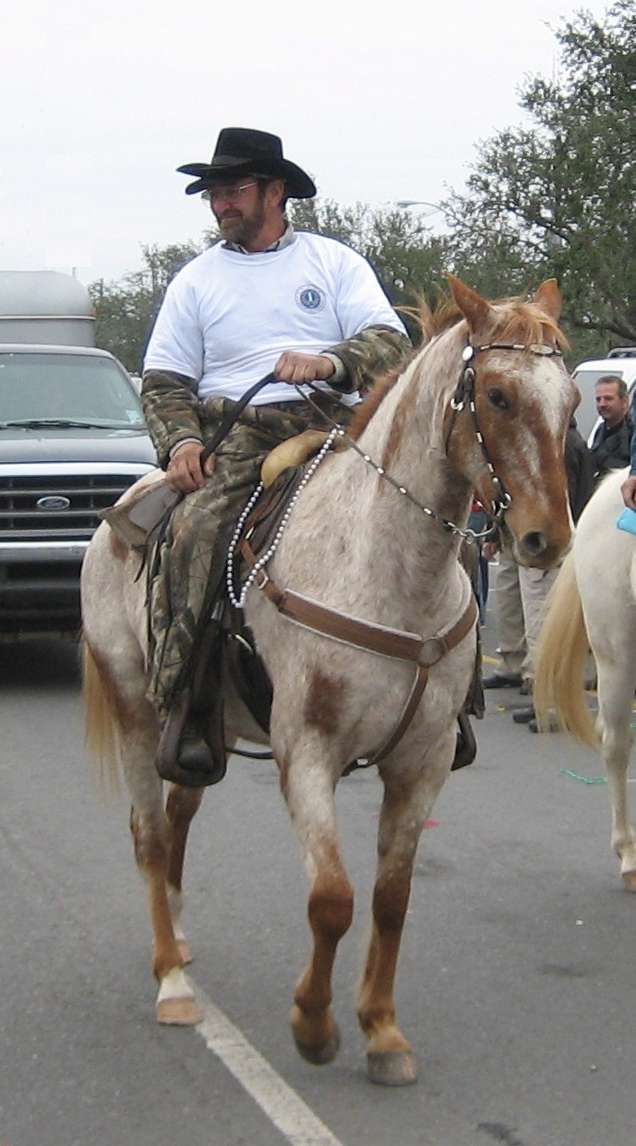
Varnish roan

Varnish roan describes a horse with coloration similar to roan, but with some changes in color over the years, though not to the extreme of a gray. This type of roaning only occurs in conjunction with the Leopard complex. Varnish roans are born with a dark base coat color, usually with some spotting. As the horse ages, white hairs increase over most of the body, and many spotted markings blur or fade. The varnish roan pattern often appears to spread from the white of any original markings. This color pattern is best known in the Appaloosa breed of horse.

Varnish roan is not a result of the roan or the Gray gene, but part of the Leopard complex. A horse may have varnish roan coloration in conjunction with other leopard patterns.

== Characteristics ==
By adulthood, the varnish roan usually has a base coat of intermingled dark and white hairs, though more white hairs than dark, with mottled skin, color mainly on the cheeks of the face, and around the knees. The darker areas remain at bony points (on the face, usually in a distinct V on the bridge of the nose; on the cheeks, point of shoulder, elbows, knees, point of hips, hock) and it can be seasonal as well. Although classic roans are roan from birth, varnish roans are often born with spots and "roan out" as they age. A horse's appearance can change almost completely, although the original markings are usually visible.

The pattern is not completely stable. The horse is born another color (usually another leopard pattern), and the Varnish pattern gradually overtakes it by adulthood. After the horse is mature, the coat color may lighten slightly when the horse has a long winter coat, and darken slightly in the summer when the winter coat sheds out. However, unlike the gray gene, the color does not get progressively lighter every year for the life of the horse, though it may look a bit different from year to year while the horse is young.

== Varnish vs true roan ==
The varnish roan is not a true roan, it is actually one of the leopard complex coat patterns associated with Appaloosa, Knabstrupper, Noriker horse and related breeds. Varnish roans are not true roans and can be distinguished from true roans by the following:

- Leopard complex characteristics. Varnish roans, like all horses with the Lp gene, have mottled skin, striped hooves, and white sclera.
- Varnish roans change color seasonally, often becoming less spotted as they age, and often having their coats become lighter when a winter coat grows in, though they do not progressively lighten in the manner of a gray horse.
- Bony areas retain their pigment longer. These areas include the bridge of the nose and cheekbones, ears, points of shoulder and stifle, as well as the legs.
- Appaloosa characteristic parentage.

== Genetics ==
Varnish roan is thought to occur due a single, simple dominant gene on equine chromosome 1 (ECA1). It also appears that specific white patterning genes produce the assorted blanket, leopard, and snowflake coat patterns. Without these white patterning factors, horses with one or two copies of the dominant Lp gene are "varnish roans." Varnish roans can be considered to have many, many very small leopard spots that reflect the mottling of the underlying skin.

A horse may be varnish roan as well as true roan and gray, but such combinations are extremely uncommon. The breeding of grays is discouraged by the Appaloosa Horse Club and not allowed by Knabstrupper breed registry.

== See also ==
- Equine coat color genetics
- Appaloosa
- Equine coat color
- Roan (horse)
