= Lykoi =

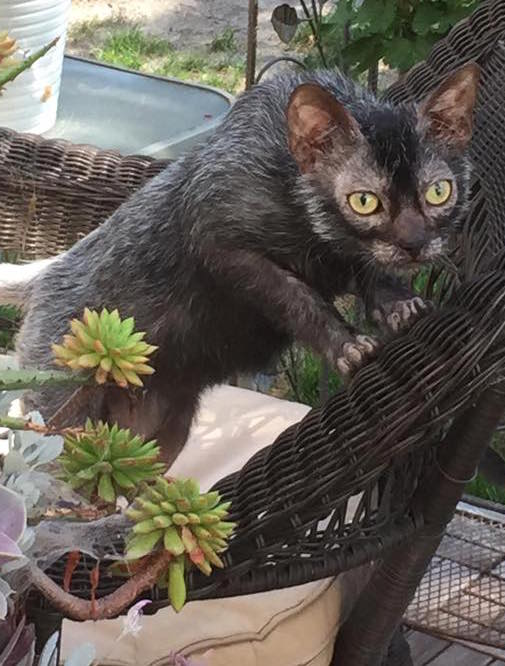
- Common nicknames: Werewolf cat, wolf cat
- Origin: United States

Breed standards
- CFA: standard
- TICA: standard
- WCF: standard
- GCCF: standard

The Lykoi (commonly called wolf cat or werewolf cat) is a breed of cat derived from a natural mutation causing a form of hypotrichia (e.g. congenital alopecia) found in domestic short-haired cats. This mutation results in sparse, patchy fur, particularly around the face, giving individuals a "wolf-like" appearance, as well as periodic full or partial molting. Lykoi cats are highly susceptible to cysts and other skin problems.

The name Lykoi comes from Greek: λύκος, romanized: lýkos, meaning 'wolf.'

They are often described as having sweet personalities and as being active, playful, reserved, and independent. The roan pattern standard for Lykoi cats is unique among cats.

DNA testing confirms that the cats do not carry several genes responsible for other hair variations, including the KRT71 mutations responsible for hairlessness in Sphynx cats and for curly hair in Devon rex and Selkirk rex cats.

The breed was developed by Brittney Gobble in Vonore, Tennessee, in the early 2010s, with the first intentionally-bred Lykoi kitten being born in 2011. Dr. Leslie Lyons, veterinary Dr. Johnny Gobble, and UC Davis were involved in the initial genetic testing to determine overall health before development of the breed was continued. Patti Thomas and Wendy Barnes were also involved.

Sixteen distinct lineages have been identified as of 2020, with founders hailing from Canada, France, and across the US, including Tennessee, Virginia, Texas, and Missouri. As of 2020, at least four different variations of the genome that cause this condition have been identified.

== Characteristics ==
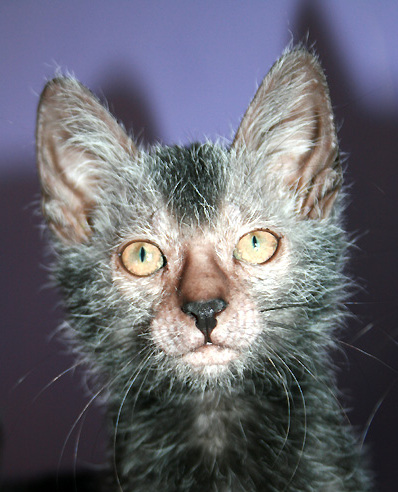
Facial detail of a black roan Lykoi

Lykoi are notable for their "mask" of hairless skin across the face and nose and around the eyes.

They also undergo regular molting and regrowth of their hair, with individuals varying from completely covered in fur to almost entirely hairless across their lifespan. Owners often call molting "wolfing out."

The exact pattern, timing, and extensiveness of molting may vary widely across individuals. Some factors that seem to influence molting include genetics, hormone levels, climate, and age. More recently established lineages of cats, younger cats, cats in colder climates, and pregnant cats seem to tend towards thicker pelts overall, though the breed is newly established and patterns are uncertain.

Breed standards call for a roan coat, consisting of a mixture of fully white and fully colored hairs. Any color is accepted, though black is most common. Lykoi are the only known cat breed to possess the roaning pattern. Additionally, Lykoi are expected to have a wedge-shaped head and a lithe body without excessive bulk.

== History of the cat breed ==
Two different sets of domestic short-hairs with the Lykoi gene were adopted from a rescue after being discovered in Virginia in 2010, by Patti Thomas, who co-founded and named the breed, and in 2011, a second pair were located in Tennessee, by Johnny Gobble.

The Lykoi is a naturally occurring gene in the feral cat population. The Lykoi breed was founded in 2011 by Johnny Gobble, Brittney Gobble, and Patti Thomas when two unrelated litters of kittens were presented to the founders as unique cats. The Gobbles did careful health evaluations to ensure that the cat's unusual appearance was not caused by sickness or disease although this evaluation only included young kittens and cats and was not extensive.

To prove that it was a gene, Johnny Gobble bred two of the unrelated cats to produce the first intentionally bred Lykoi. Since the mother to one litter was a black domestic, extensive outcrossing with short-haired black domestic cats began. With time, it was determined that the gene was recessive, and to continue to reduce genetic inbreeding, more outcrossing with the black domestic cats was done. There are still Lykoi cats born to the feral cat population, and sometimes they can be used in the breeding program. Once Championship status is reached, there should be enough outcrossing to ensure that inbreeding is minimal.

In The International Cat Association (TICA) registry, the Lykoi went before the board in 2012 and was passed to "Registration Only" status by unanimous consent. The breed was eventually recognized as a Championship Breed and were able to begin competing against other Championship breeds from May 2017, with TICA. Work is currently being done to expand the breeding program.

In The Cat Fanciers' Association (CFA), Lykoi of all colors are accepted and compete in Championship Breed beginning 2023–2024.

== Health ==
Lykoi are susceptible for several of the same concerns as Sphynx and other hairless cats, such sensitivity to climate and temperature, sunburn, and increased risk for skin cancer.

A 2020 study found several differences in the skin and hair of Lykoi compared to domestic shorthair cats, which were used as a control group. All cats surveyed were found to have some degree of lymphocytic mural folliculitis, resulting in significantly sparser hair on Lykoi cats. These cats seem to be in a perpetual state of allergic reaction, as this condition is usually seen in cats experiencing skin inflammation. Symptoms include crusted skin, hair loss, itching, and scabbing.

The same study also found that Lykoi cats have an increased average sebaceous gland area per hair follicle group when compared to domestic shorthair cats, and owners are advised to take extra care in grooming and bathing Lykoi cats to prevent overly oily skin.

Lykoi are extremely prone to cysts and blackheads. It is unclear exactly how severe these are, with breeders and owners claiming they are largely cosmetic and have no impact on cats while activists claim they detract from quality of life. The cysts, folliculitis, and distinctive partially hairless appearance all result from the same genetic variation, and attempts to "breed out" the skin conditions have also resulted in less noticeable masking and roaning.
