= Leopard pattern =

Spotted color pattern

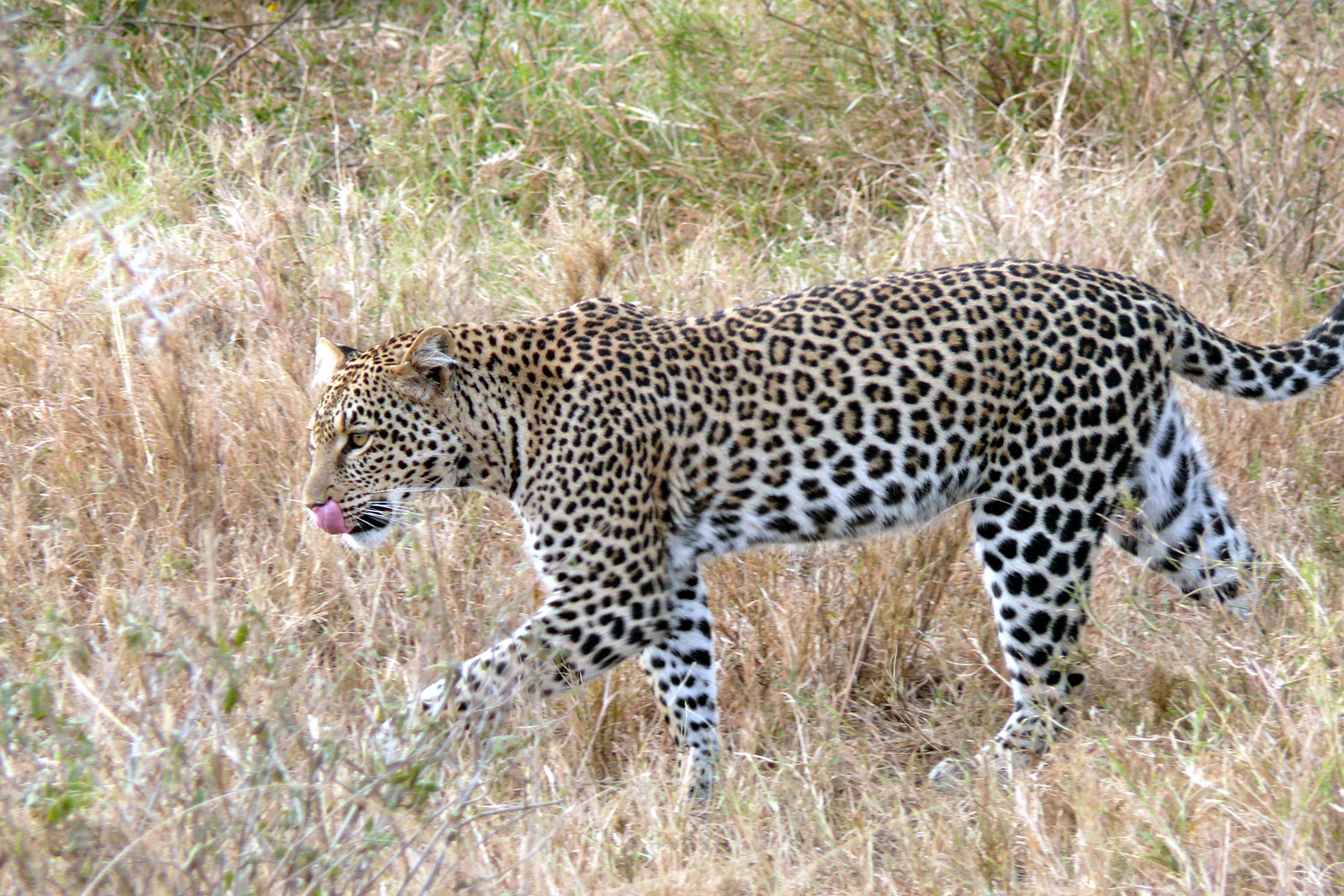
A leopard, the animal with a classic leopard hair coat pattern

A leopard pattern is a spotted color pattern, particularly in the hair coat or skin of animals, but can also describe spotting patterns in plants and a distinctive print appearing on clothing and other fabrics.

== In animals ==
In the animal world, leopard pattern refers to the black and gold spotted coat of the leopard, but is used to describe many color combinations that result in spots scattered across the skin or hair coat of other animals. Examples of animals with coloring patterns termed leopard include many great cats in the genus Panthera, the leopard frog, the "leopard" spotting pattern in the Appaloosa and Knabstrupper breeds of horses, the leopard seal, insects such as the giant leopard moth, and fish species such as the leopard darter, leopard shark, and the leopard eel. Examples of plants that use the term include the leopard lily, and the leopard flower. Other animals with leopard patterns include the leopard cat, snow leopard, clouded leopard, leopard gecko and the leopard tortoise among some others.

The Lp (leopard complex) gene is responsible for the leopard color pattern in horses, which not only produces a spotted coat color but also causes mottling of the skin, a white sclera around the eye, and striped hooves. Horses with the Lp gene may be spotted all over, or may have concentrations of spots in various patterns.

Some other animal breeds like dogs, such as Dalmatians, Catahoula Leopard Dogs and American Leopard Hounds also have similar leopard color patterns.

== Gallery ==
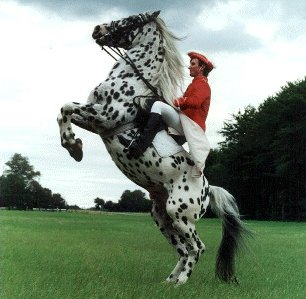
A leopard-patterned Knabstrupper horse

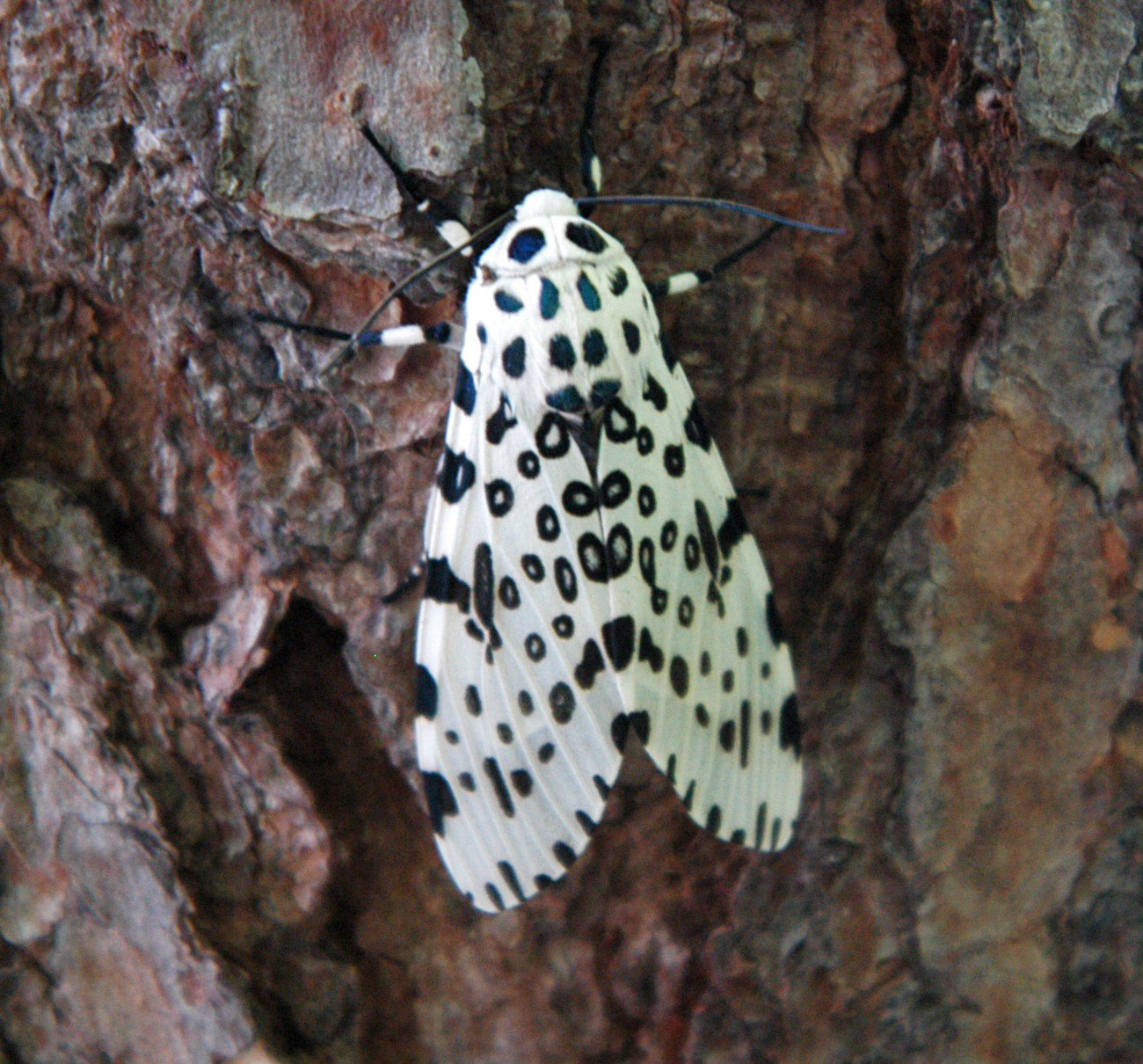
The giant leopard moth

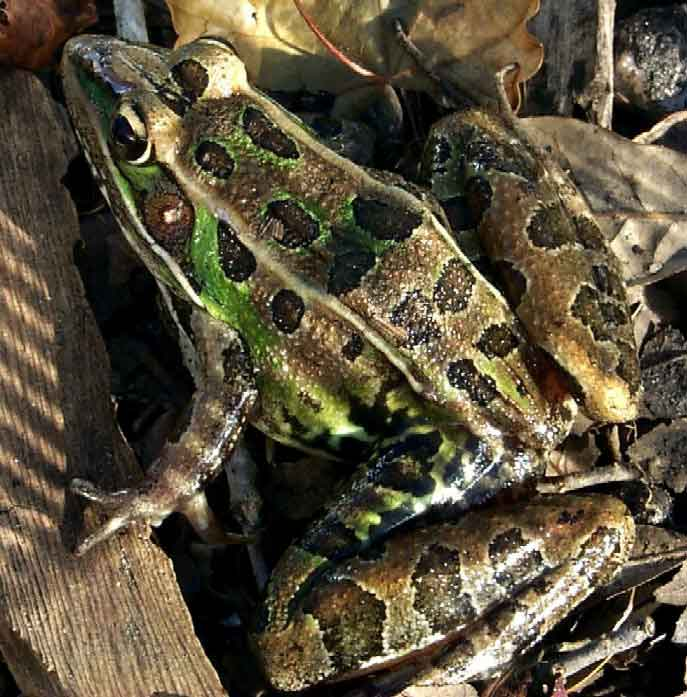
A southern leopard frog

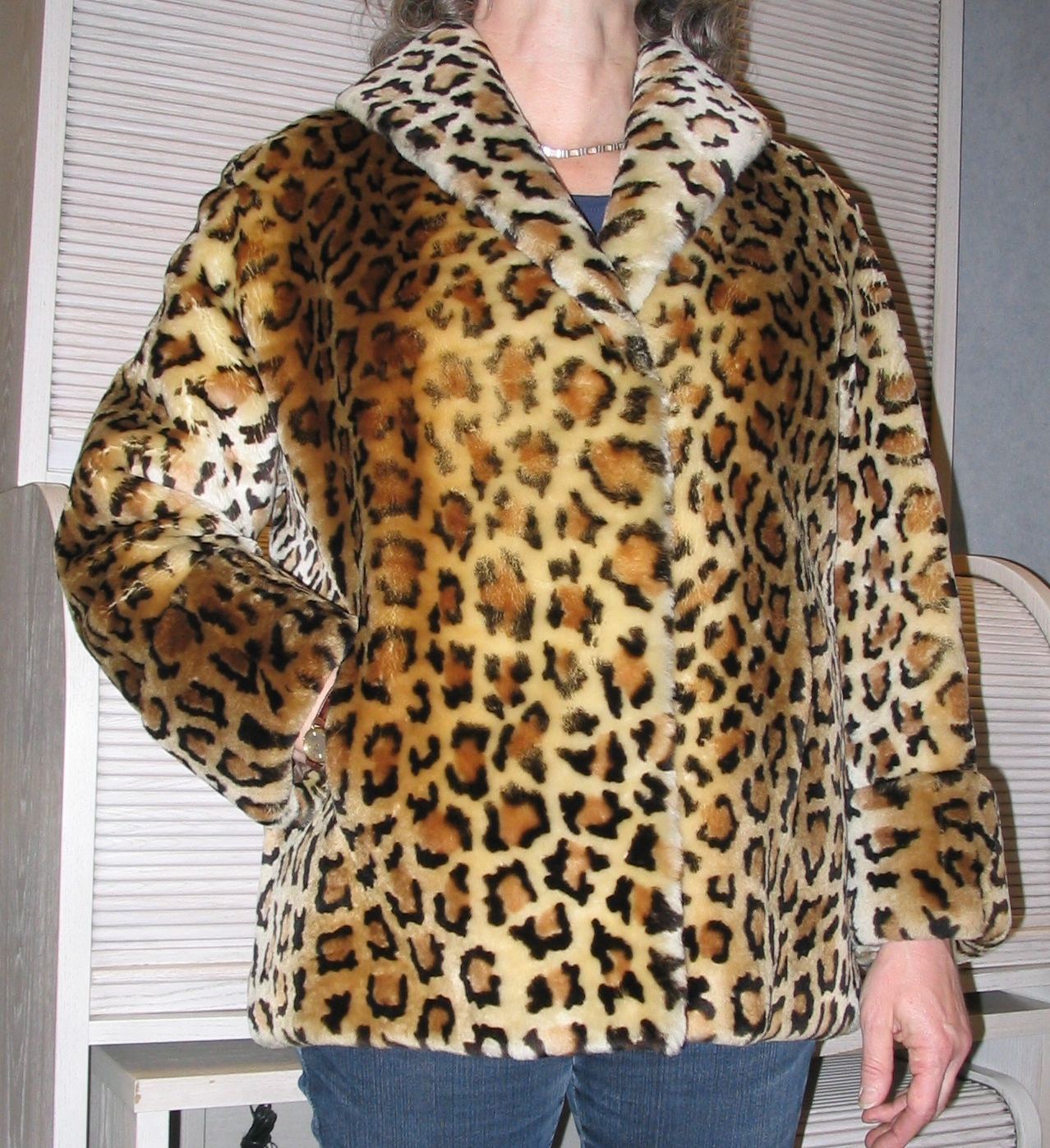
A leopard print jacket

== See also ==
- Animal print
- Rosette (zoology)
- Turing pattern
