= Roan (horse) =

Horse coat color pattern

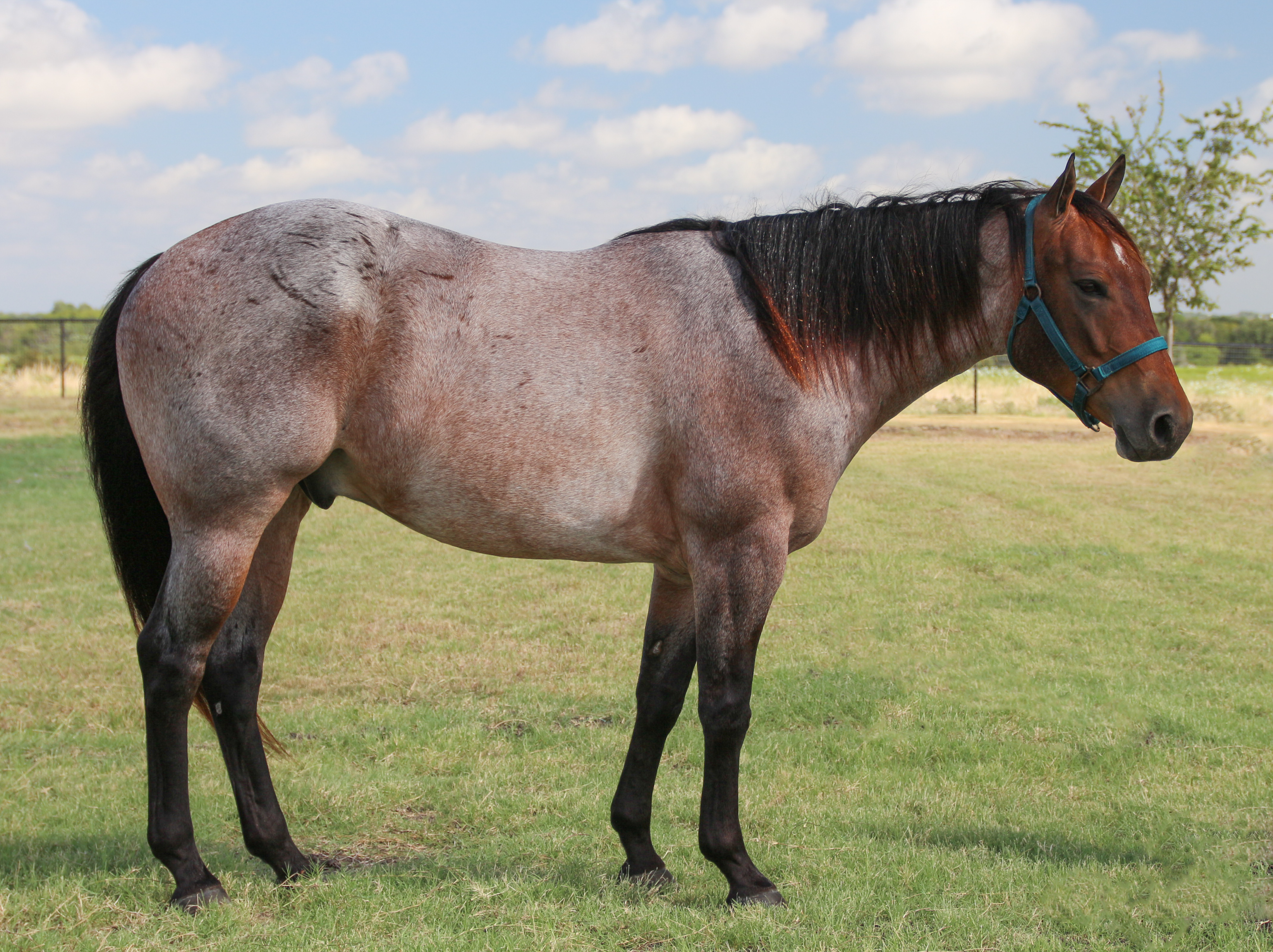
Bay roan (sometimes called "red roan")

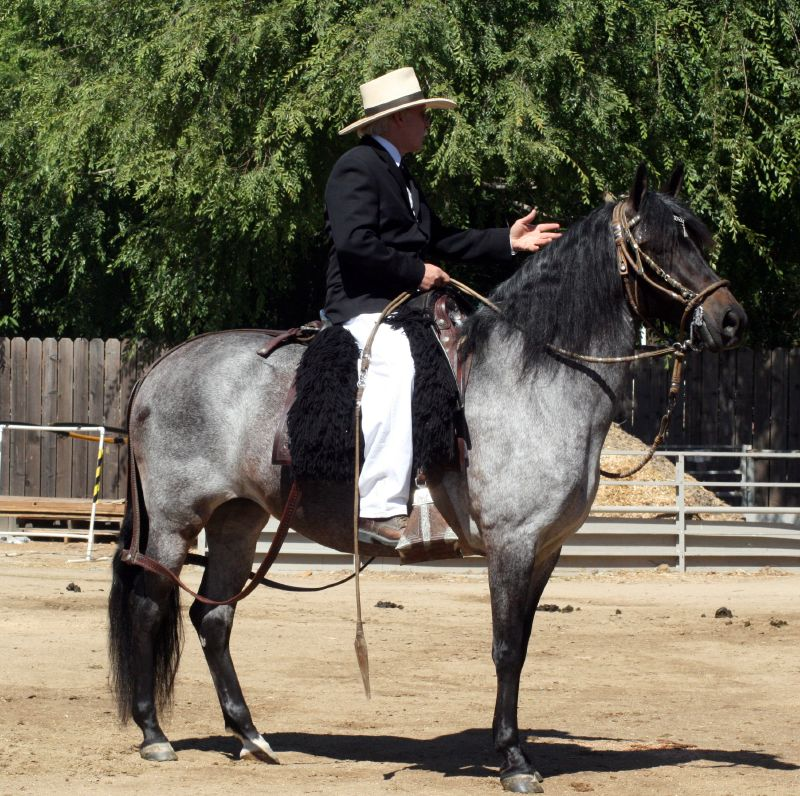
A "blue roan", roaning over a black base coat

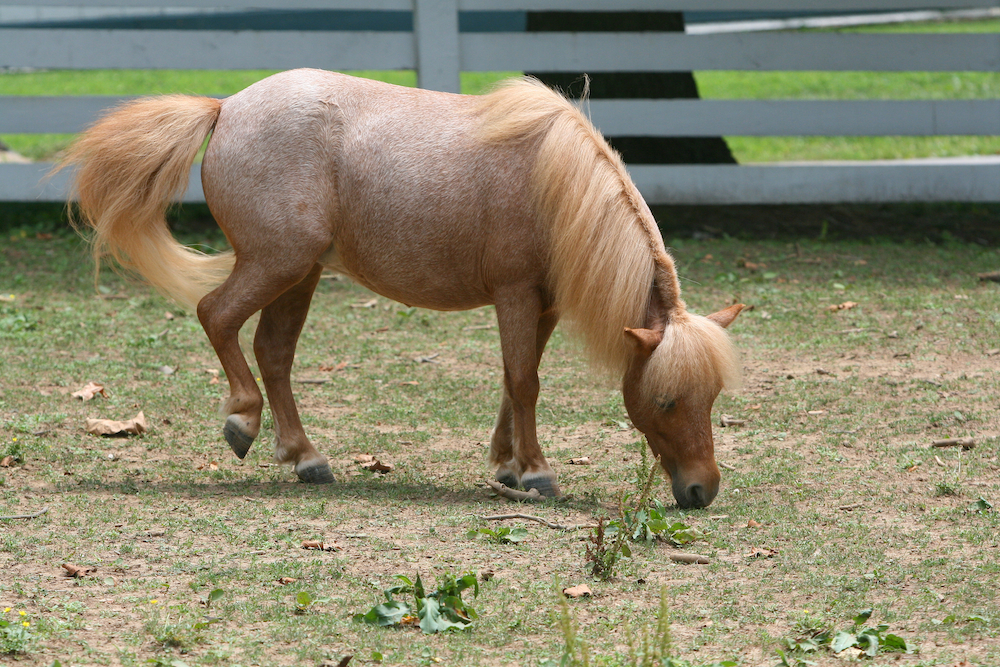
Red roan, roaning over chestnut, sometimes called "strawberry roan"

Roan is a horse coat color pattern characterized by an even mixture of colored and white hairs on the body. The roan pattern is dominantly inherited, and is found in many horse breeds. While the specific mutation responsible for roan has not been exactly identified, a DNA test can determine zygosity for roan in several breeds. The pattern is present at birth, though it may be hard to see until after the foal coat sheds out. The coat may lighten or darken from winter to summer, but unlike the gray coat color, which also begins with intermixed white and colored hairs, roans do not become progressively lighter in color as they age. The silvering effect of mixed white and colored hairs can create coats that look bluish or pinkish.

== Identification ==
Horses with the roan pattern have an even mixture of white and colored hairs in the coat. These interspersed white hairs are more scattered or absent on the horse's points—lower legs, mane and tail. The unaffected color on the legs often forms a sharp, inverted "V" above the knee and hock, not seen in other roan-like coat patterns. The nonwhite background coat may be any color, as determined by unrelated genetic factors.

Often, the background coat color is used in combination with the word roan to describe the shade of a roan horse's coat, such as bay roan or gold champagne roan, but colloquial terms also are used for some colors. The most common terms for various roan colors are:

- Blue roan is loosely applied to any roan with a dark underlying coat that gives it a bluish cast. In the strictest sense, though, "blue roan" is a common synonym for a roan with a black background coat.
- Red roan used to include both chestnut and bay roans. In 1999, the American Paint Horse Association changed its coat color descriptions; roans with a chestnut background coat are registered "red roan", while "bay roan" is its own category. The American Quarter Horse Association followed suit in 2003. Previously, the term strawberry roan described the pinkish color of a light chestnut or sorrel roan. While less common, the term lilac roan may be applied to a dark chestnut roan, and honey roan to palominos or the lightest sorrels.
- Bay roan replaced red roan as the term for a roan with a bay background coat.

Some roan horses have more white hair than others, and even individual horses may look lighter or darker based on the season, and their coats may vary from year to year. While roan is always present at birth, the soft first coat of newborn foals may not show the white hairs well. Some roan horses get darker with age. Generally, roans appear to have more white hair when they have their short summer coats and darker when they have their winter coats. These peculiar tendencies of roans led to the Icelandic word for roan, which translates as "always changing color."

Roans have other unusual characteristics. If the skin is damaged by even a very minor scrape, cut, or brand, the coat grows back in solid-colored without any white hairs. These regions of solid-colored coat are called "corn spots" or "corn marks", and can appear even without the horse having had a visible injury. Another trait is reverse dappling; many horses develop rings of hair that appear slightly different-colored, called dapples, which often indicate good health. Usually dapples are darker than the surrounding coat, but on a roan, the dapples are lighter.

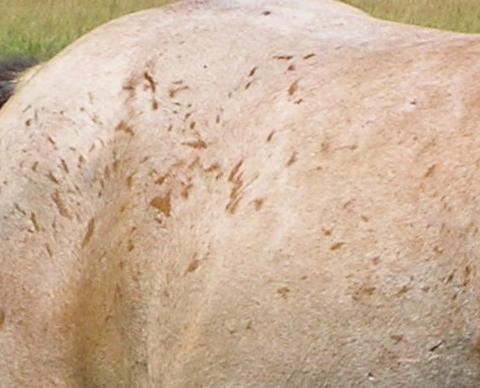
Corn marks or corn spots occur where a roan's skin has been damaged. The hair grows back in without any white.

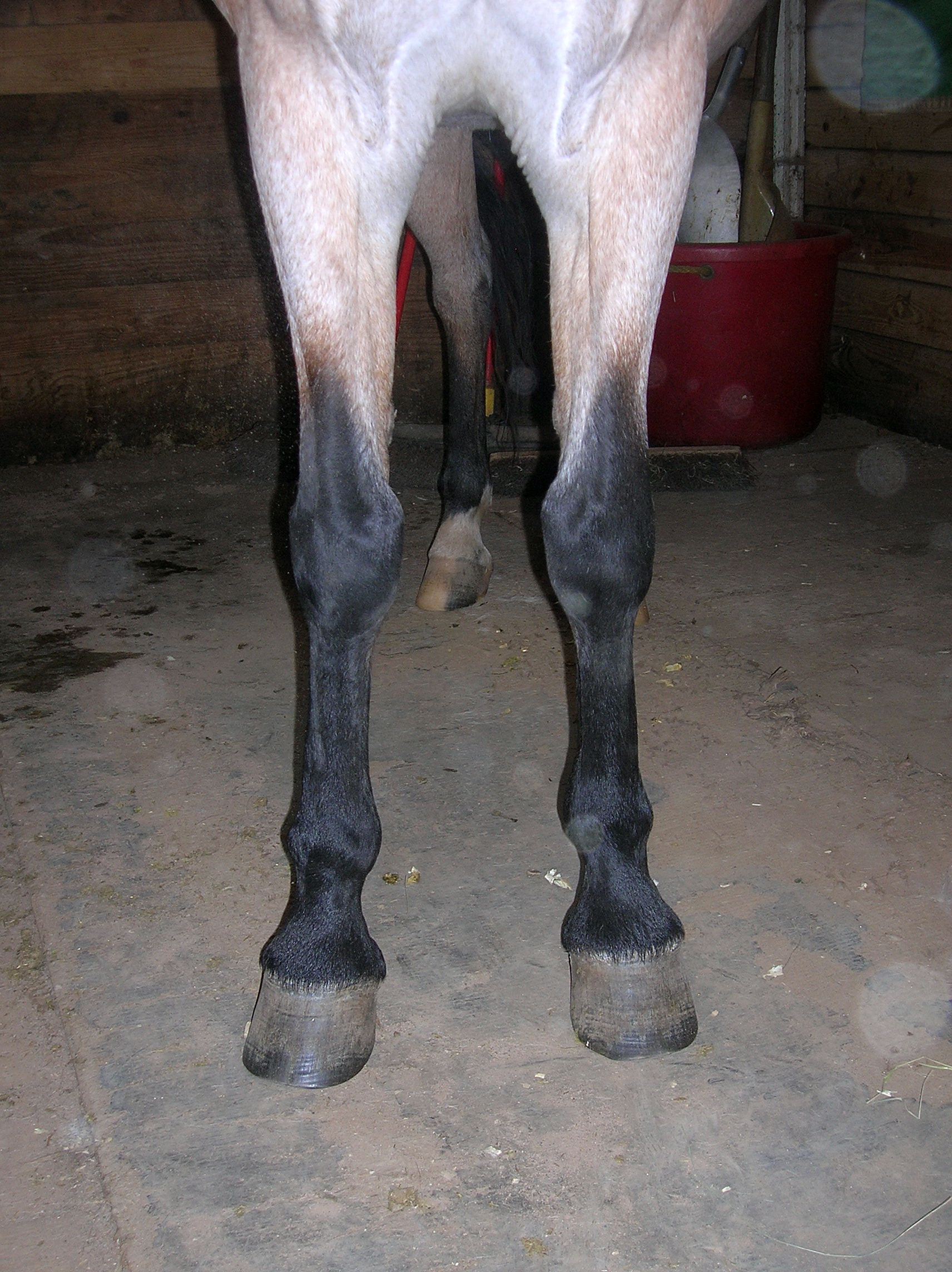
The forelegs of this bay roan show the characteristic inverted "V" of dark hair not affected by roan.

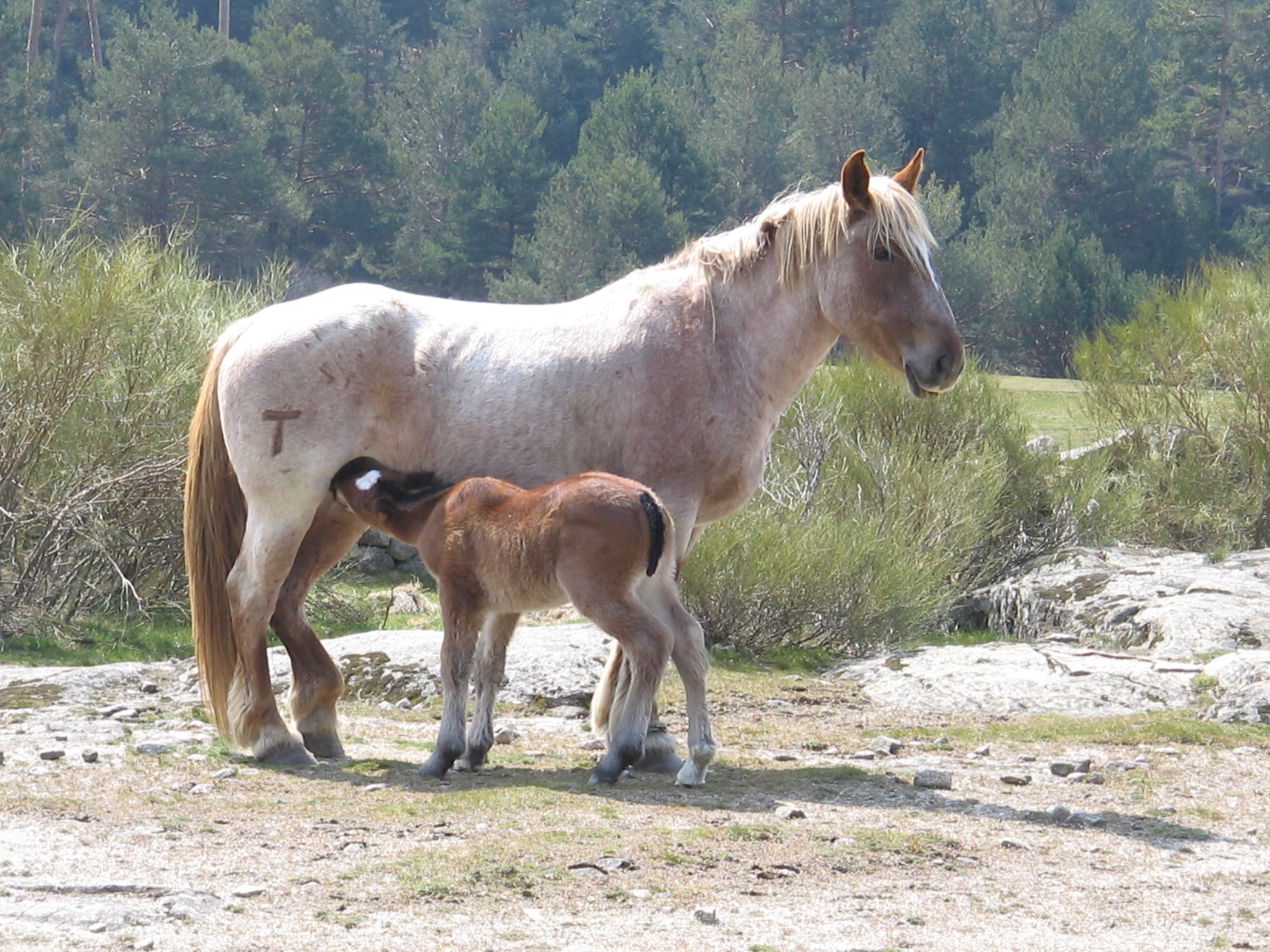
This strawberry roan mare, though very light-colored, is still identifiable as a roan by the dark color of her extremities and the brand on her hindquarters, which has grown back in without white hairs.

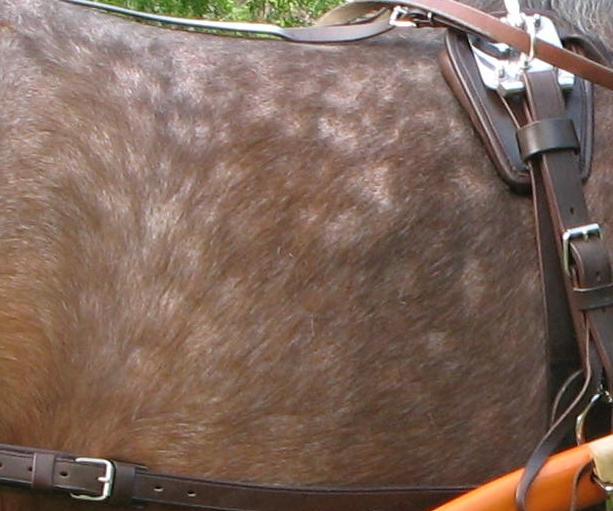
Reverse dapples on a bay roan

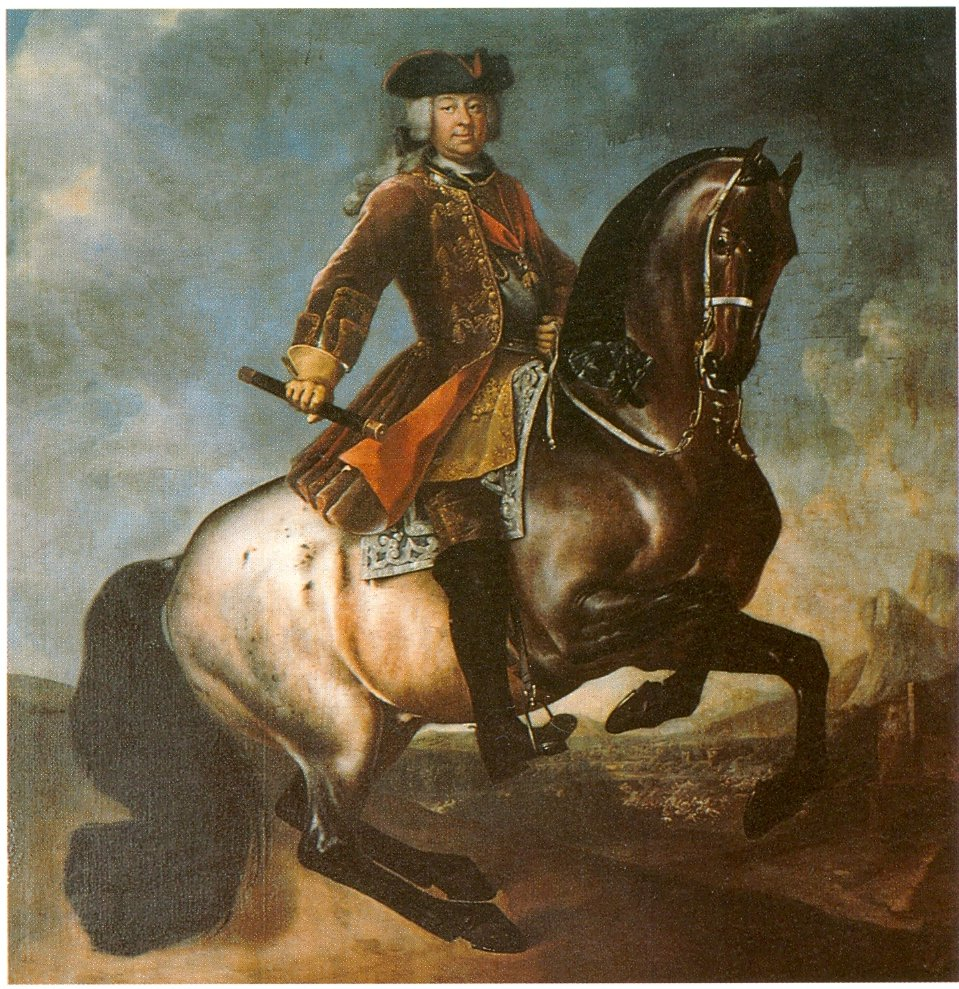
This dark bay roan, painted in the 18th century carrying the Duke of Württemberg, has dark extremities and corn spots.

== Terminology ==
In the most general sense, the word "roan" refers to any animal with a mixture of white and colored hairs in the coat. Recent research into equine coat color genetics indicates that "true roan" or "classic roan" is distinct from several similar patterns that are collectively called "roaning". In studies of the white patterning genotypes of laboratory mice, no fewer than four produced roaning or flecking. Therefore, the existence of other types of roaning conditions not covered by those mentioned here is possible and likely. The patterns identified as "roaning" have particular qualities that can be used to tell them apart from true roan.

== Roan mimics ==
=== Gray vs. roan ===
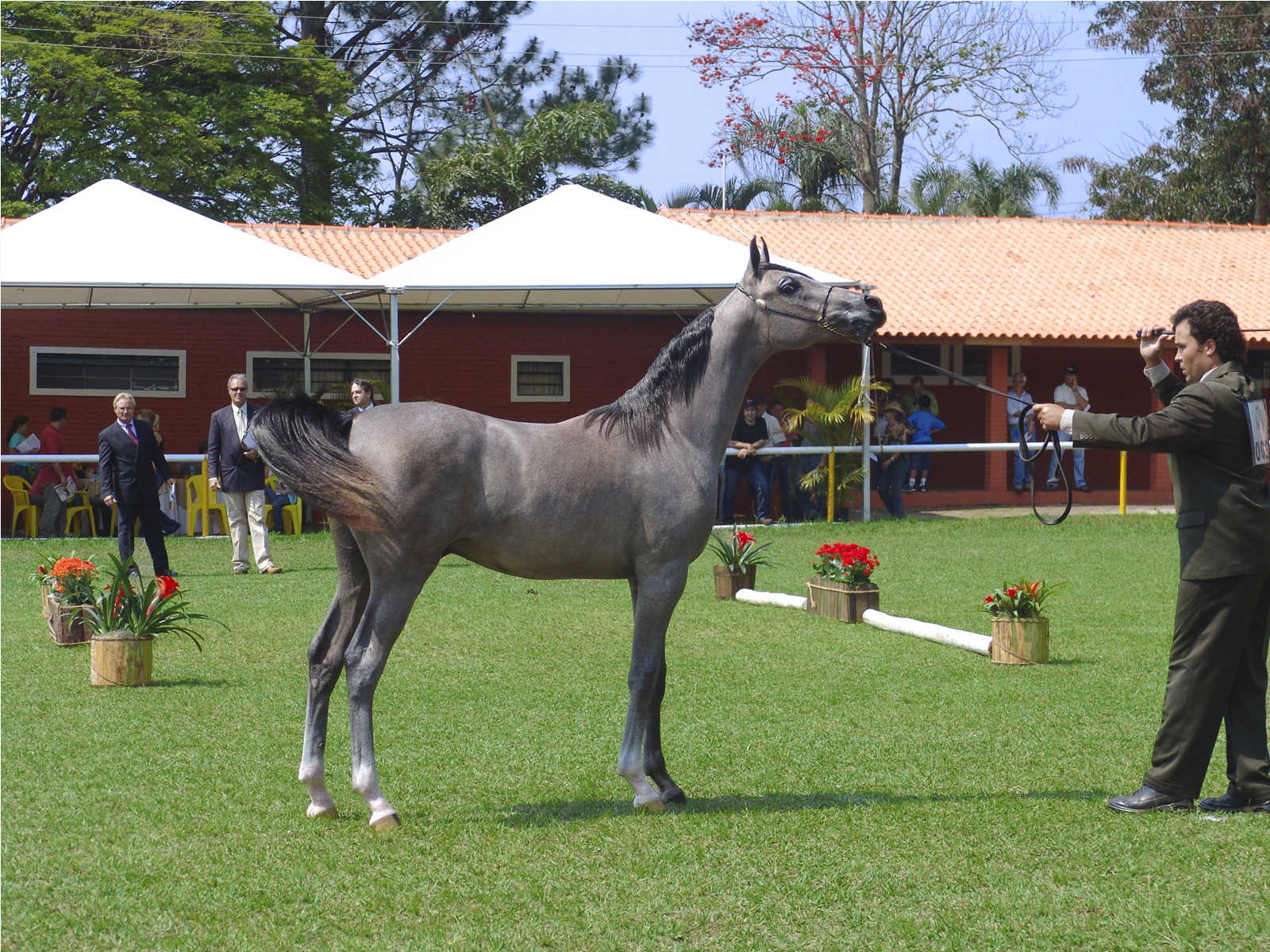
A young gray horse may appear roan, but becomes lighter with age.

Roans are sometimes mistaken for grays. However, grays lighten with age, while roans do not. Gray is one of the most common coat colors found in horses, and is found in almost all breeds. The defining characteristic of the gray coat is that it becomes progressively lighter over time. Gray foals may be born any color, and there may be no indication of the future gray coat at birth. Mature grays may retain none of their original coat color, and have a "white" coat, while the color of the skin and eyes is unchanged. The first white hairs are usually seen around the muzzle and eyes. As a gray may go from entirely colored to entirely white over the course of its life, the process of "graying out" can, at times, closely resemble roan. Thoroughbred and Arabian Horses registered as "roan" are often gray, especially chestnuts turning gray. Unlike grays, roans do not develop more white hair with age, and without white markings, roans retain colored heads.

=== Dun vs. roan ===
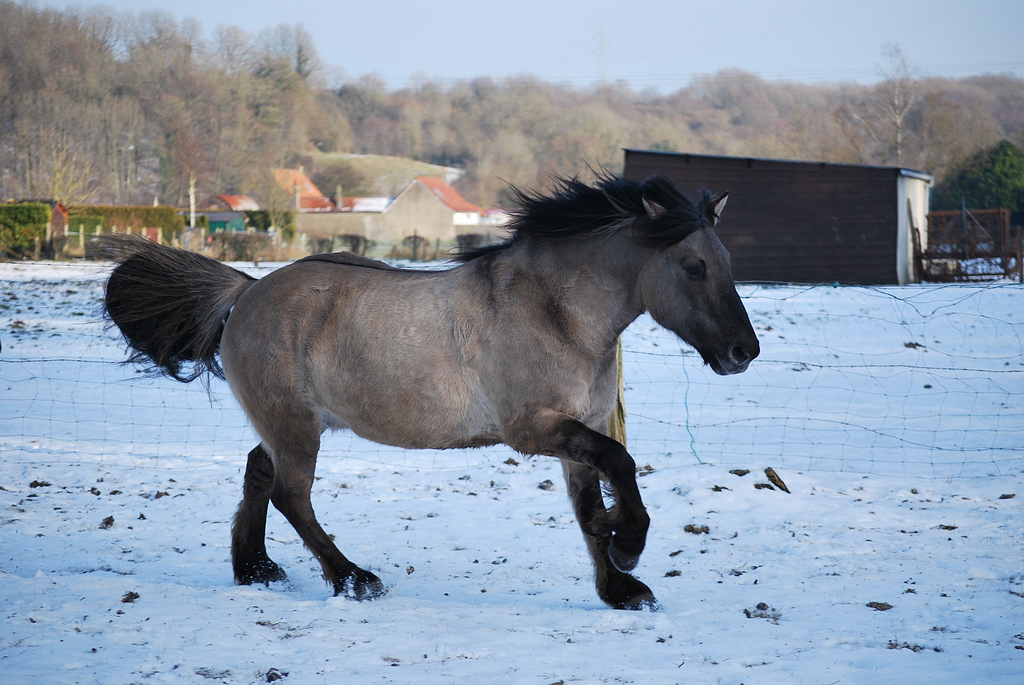
A blue dun or grullo has no intermingled white hairs in its body coat.

Blue dun or grullo (also grulla, mouse dun) coloring is created by the dun gene acting on a black base coat, and is a coat color with a bluish cast and darker points. Unlike blue roans, grullos are solid color and appear bluish due to low amounts of pigment in each hair, not interspersed white hairs. Like other dun coat colors, grullos have dark or black primitive markings, always including a stripe down the back.

=== Rabicano vs. roan ===
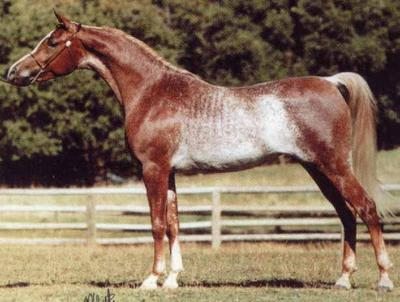
An extensively expressed rabicano Arabian horse

One pattern of roaning is rabicano, also called white ticking. While true roans have an even intermixture of white hairs throughout the body, except the extremities, the white hairs of a rabicano are densest around the base of the tail and the flank. Rabicano roaning frequently forms rings of white hair around the base of the tail, and in extensively roaned rabicanos, the white hairs may converge to form vertical stripes over the ribcage. Rabicano is found in many breeds, and may account for some "roan" Arabians.

=== Sabino vs. roan ===
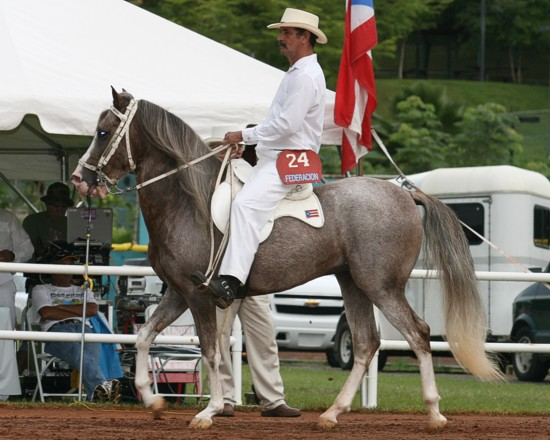
A Paso Fino with both roan and sabino patterning: The white at the end of the tail indicates gray, as well.

Roaning is also associated with some of the sabino white spotting patterns. Many patterns in many breeds are called "sabino", and these patterns usually feature irregular, rough-edged patches of white that originate from the lower legs, face, and ventral midline. The borders of these white patches can be heavily roaned, and some sabinos can be mistaken for roans. The roaning of sabinos originates in a white patch, and the roaning is uneven.

=== Varnish roan vs. roan ===
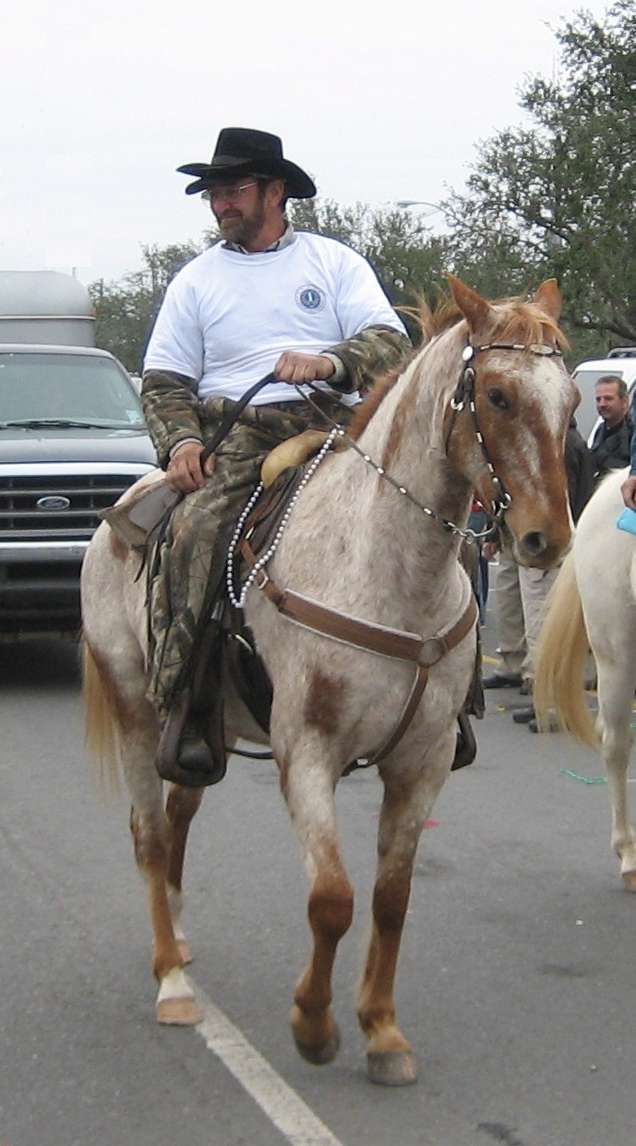
A varnish roan Appaloosa is showing white sclera, mottled skin, and darker bony regions such as the cheekbones.

The leopard complex colors, characteristic of the Appaloosa breed, have several manifestations that feature mixtures of white and colored hairs. A varnish roan, one type of leopard complex coat color also called "marble", is an all-over blend of white and colored hairs. Patches of skin that lie close to the bone, such as on the face and legs, and the point of shoulder and point of hip, do not grow as much white hair. These darker patches are called "varnish marks" and are not found in true roans. Varnish roans can also be distinguished from true roans by the presence of leopard complex characteristics, such as the white sclera, finely striped hooves, and mottled skin around the eyes, muzzle, and genitals.

== Prevalence ==
True or classic roan is common in European draft breeds such as the Brabant, Ardennes, Trait Du Nord, Italian Heavy Draft, and Rhenish-German Cold-Blood. It is also found regularly in North American breeds such as the Quarter Horse, Paint Horse, Peruvian Paso, Paso Fino, Standardbred, Spanish Mustang, Missouri Fox Trotter and Tennessee Walking Horse.

British ponies such as Dales, Welsh, Gypsy Cob, Shetland, Connemara, and New Forest ponies may be roan. Icelandic Horses and Miniature Horses may also be roan. Some roan Trakehners and American Saddlebreds are known. The Hokkaido Pony of Japan may also be roan.

To date, only one Thoroughbred family has been genetically verified as true roan, and there are no Arabians that are true roan. A small number of Thoroughbred offspring of the brindle-patterned stallion Catch A Bird phenotypically appear to be true roan, and though few of those reproduced, some offspring of his daughter Slip Catch, though registered as bay, have apparently been verified as carrying the roan gene.

Nonetheless, most Thoroughbreds and Arabians with roan-like coats are most likely related to graying or rabicano characteristics. Thoroughbred "roans" are described by the Jockey Club as a mixture of white with red or brown hairs, but which researchers identify as chestnuts turning gray. The Arabian Horse Association defines "roan" as an even mixture of white and colored, usually chestnut, hairs, but researchers suggest most animals so classified are probably either rabicano, or have a partially-spotted pattern that results from a dominant white allele.

== Genetics ==
Roan is a simple dominant trait symbolized by the Rn allele. Traits that are dominantly inherited cannot skip generations, meaning that two nonroan parents cannot produce a roan offspring. In cases where roan has appeared to skip generations, one of the parents is usually discovered to be slightly roaned. A roan can also be born from two seemingly nonroan parents if the roan coat is "masked" by extensive white markings or gray. In some cases, the supposedly roan offspring is not true roan at all, but rabicano, sabino, or influenced by some other genetic factor.

The University of California, Davis School of Veterinary Medicine's genetics services has developed a DNA test that uses genetic markers to indirectly determine the number of Rn or rn alleles a horse has. The mutation responsible for true roan has not yet been identified exactly, but been assigned to equine chromosome 3 (ECA3) in the KIT sequence. A roan zygosity test is reliable for American Quarter Horse, American Paint Horse, Welsh Pony, and Gypsy Cob. Until a direct test is developed, the roan zygosity test may enable breeders to produce roans more reliably.

Recently the company Etalon Dx has discovered Roan associated alleles for 3 specific lineages in horse. The RN1 allele (same as the Marklund et al 2008 variant) is seen in many breeds, whereas the RN2 and RN3 variants are seen in Quarter horses mostly. Within Quarter horses, the RN1 variant (e.g. Red Man) traces back to the Burnett roan mare, the RN2 variant (e.g. Metallic Cat) traces back to the Burns mare, and the RN3 variant (e.g., Zippos Mr Good Bar) traces back to Kitch Roan mare. (See doi: 10.3390/ani15162386 and doi: 10.3390/ani15121705). This test has already shown multiple homozygous roan horses.

=== Homozygous roan ===
A 1979 study of American-bred Belgian draft horses found fewer roan offspring from roan-to-roan matings than expected for a simple dominant trait. Finding neither stillborn nor sickly, short-lived foals from these roan parents, the researchers concluded that in the homozygous condition the roan gene was lethal to the embryo or fetus. Other studies at the time were using progeny ratios to identify potential lethality related to other coat colors, such as "dominant white" and "lethal white", so roan was believed to follow a similar pattern. Genetic science in the 1970s could not provide a clear answer, as methods of molecular analysis had not yet been developed.

The belief in "lethal roan" persisted until recently, when homozygous roan stallions with large numbers of offspring - all roan - were satisfactorily identified. Homozygous roan stallions were identified in both European populations of Belgian horses in 1977, and in North American, in Quarter Horse stallions.

In some breeds, homozygous roans can be identified by an indirect DNA marker test. Such horses, with the genotype Rn/Rn, produce 100% roan offspring. Homozygous roans and heterozygous roans (Rn/rn) are identical in appearance.

=== Equine linkage group II ===
During the production of sex cells, DNA is "reshuffled" to ensure that the next generation does not inherit ancestral chromosomes as is, but a mixture of DNA from each parent. Paired chromosomes exchange parallel pieces of DNA, a process called chromosomal crossover, prior to being passed on to the next generation. When particular genes are located physically close together on a chromosome, they tend to be exchanged together. The rate at which two genes are passed on together can be used to calculate their distance from each other on the chromosome. Genes that tend to be passed on as a group form what is called a "linkage group".

Equine linkage group II includes a number of genes. The first linkage was found between a blood type marker and tobiano white spotting in 1978. The same blood type marker, albumin, was linked to another blood protein called vitamin D-binding protein. In 1982, a linkage grouping was proposed, including three genes for serum proteins, and three for coat color: tobiano spotting, chestnut, and roan. Research since equine linkage group II was defined has identified the exact location of the tobiano allele and the chestnut allele. The region of the chromosome that harbors the roan gene is homologous to parts of chromosomes in other species that also control coat color, even some similar to roan. Presently, the KIT gene is the primary candidate gene for roan. While a chromosomal inversion of KIT causes tobiano white spotting, KIT also harbors one or more alleles responsible for sabino spotting, no fewer than eleven alleles responsible for dominant white spotting, and is thought to be a major contributor to many other forms of less distinctive white markings.

The effect of linkage between roan and chestnut is readily observed. If a horse possesses one chromosome with the wildtype nonchestnut allele and the dominant roan allele (E and Rn), while the other chromosome contains the recessive chestnut allele and the recessive nonroan allele (e and rn), it will outwardly appear blue roan, barring the influence of other genes. Normally, the chestnut and roan alleles would be separated during chromosomal crossover, but these two linked genes usually remain together. Such a horse will produce sex cells that are either E/Rn or e/rn. Mated to chestnut nonroan partners (e/rn), the horse would produce primarily blue roans, or chestnut nonroans, but few chestnut roans and few black nonroans. If the recessive e and dominant Rn were on the same chromosome, though, the horse would be expected to produce primarily chestnut roans and nonchestnut nonroans with chestnut, nonroan partners.

=== Cultural/Historical References ===
The Blue Roan was a popular horse kept and ridden by the 10th Sikh Guru, Guru Gobind Singh during the late 17th-early 18th century. He was known as the "Blue Horse Rider" or "One Who Rides the Blue Horse" during his time.

== See also ==
- Chestnut (horse color)
