= Knabstrupper =

Danish breed of horse, spotted

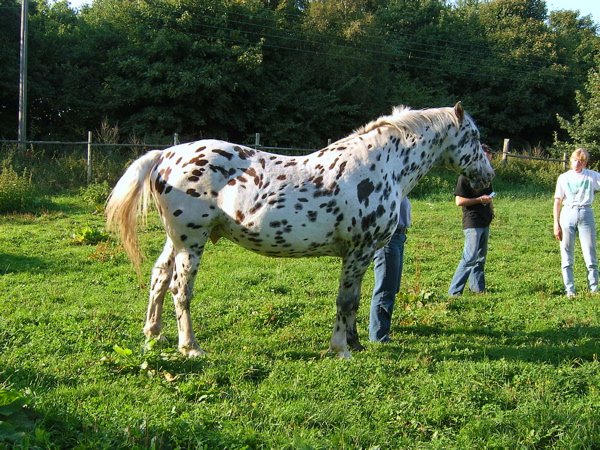
- Conservation status: FAO (2007): not at risk; DAD-IS (2022): at risk/endangered
- Other names: Knabstrup; Knabstrupperhesten
- Country of origin: Denmark
- Distribution: Denmark; Australia; Germany; Italy
- Use: riding, driving, circus

Traits
- Weight: average 500 kg (1100 lb)
- Height: 154–162 cm
- Colour: usually spotted

Breed standards
- Knabstrupper Association of Denmark

The Knabstrupper or Knabstrup is a Danish breed of warmblood horse. It is principally a riding horse, but is also used as a harness horse and as a circus animal. It is broadly similar to the Frederiksborger, but often has a spotted coat. In the past, injudicious breeding for this characteristic alone compromised its constitution and conformation. In the years after the Second World War the mechanisation of agriculture led to a sharp fall in numbers, and by the 1960s no more than 100 of the horses remained. In the twenty-first century it is an endangered breed, with a world-wide population estimated at little over 2000.

== Characteristics ==
The horses usually stand between 154 and 162 cm at the withers; small or pony-sized ones have also been bred.

According to the Knabstrupperforeningen for Danmark, the EU-approved main organization for the Knabstrupper breed, the primary colouration should be spotted. Solid-coloured horses must only be bred to spotted-coloured horses. To be eligible for registration and breeding, a horse must also display one or more characteristics of striped hooves, mottled skin, and white sclera (white of the eye), though if still in doubt, the presence of the LP-gene may be documented with a gene-test. Horses with a grey gene, rat tail (sparse hair), or distinct pinto colourations are not eligible for registration or breeding.

A 2022 study found that Knabstruppers are predisposed to Equine recurrent uveitis.

== Breed history ==
The Knabstrupper descends from a single mare believed to have originated in Spain who showed qualities of endurance and speed, and was of an unusual colouration: a deep red (German: Zobelfuchs) with a white tail and mane, and white flecks or "snowflakes" over her whole body and brown spots on her back. She was called Flaebehoppen, 'Flaebe's mare', because she was reportedly bought by a butcher named Flaebe from an officer of the Spanish army. He sold her to Willars Knudsen Lunn, who took her to his estate at Knabstrup Hovedgård in the kommune of Holbæk in northern Zealand. There, in 1808, after a month of testing of her working capabilities, he bred her to a Frederiksborger stallion. The stallion Mikkel, a grandson of this pair foaled in 1818, was a noted harness-racer and a foundation stallion of the Knabstrupper breed. In 1971, three Appaloosa stallions were imported to Denmark in the hope of adding new blood to the Knabstrupper breed; only two of them were used, and many breeders preferred to cross-breed with Danish Warmblood, Holsteiner or Trakehner stock.

As of 2024, crossing Knabstruppers with other breeds such as Thoroughbreds, Arabians and other warmbloods may lead to approval, but crossing with Appaloosas will not.

== Uses ==
The Knabstrupper has long been used as a circus horse, and is well suited to driving and equestrian vaulting. It is also used in dressage, show-jumping and eventing.
