= Equine coat color =

Horse coat colors and markings

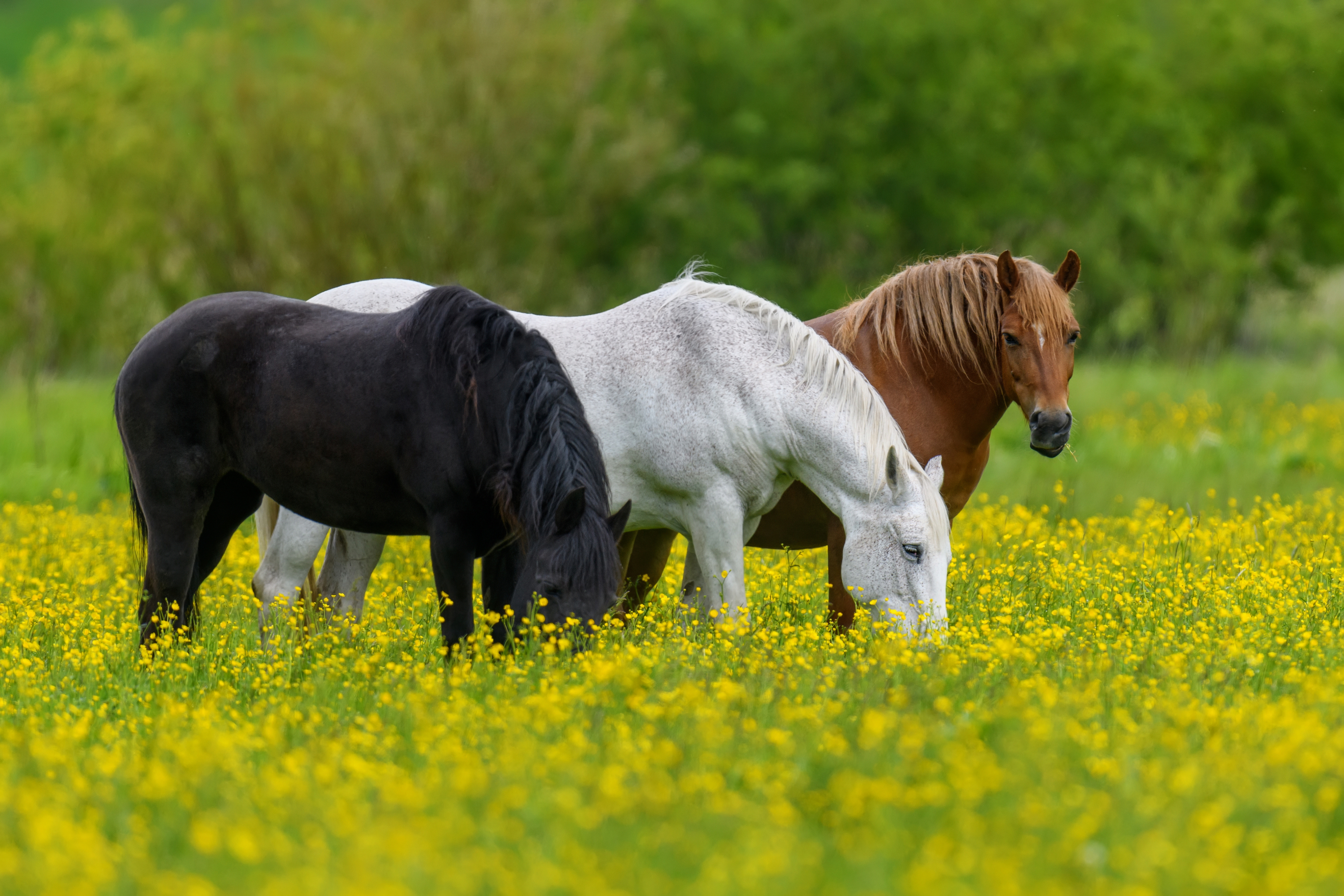
Three horses with different coat colors

Horses exhibit a diverse array of coat colors and distinctive markings. A specialized vocabulary has evolved to describe them.

While most horses remain the same coat color throughout life, some undergo gradual color changes as they age. Most white markings are present at birth, and the underlying skin color of a healthy horse does not change. Certain coat colors are also associated with specific breeds, such as the Friesian, which is almost exclusively black.

The basic outline of equine coat color genetics has largely been resolved, and DNA tests to determine the likelihood that a horse will have offspring of a given color have been developed for some colors. Discussion, research, and even controversy continue about some of the details, particularly those surrounding spotting patterns, color sub-shades such as "sooty" or "flaxen", and markings.

== Basic coat colors ==
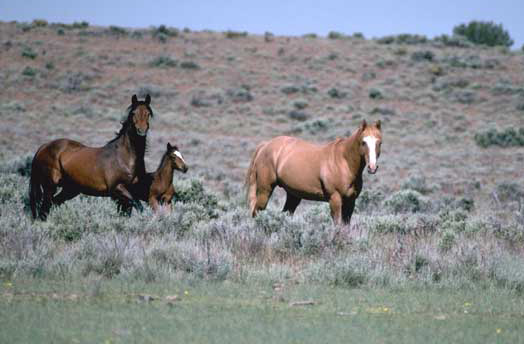
Bay (left) and chestnut (right)

The two basic pigment colors of horse hairs are pheomelanin ("red"), which produces a reddish brown color, and eumelanin, which produces black. These two hair pigment genes create two base colors: chestnut, which is fully red, and black, which is fully black.

All other coat colors are created by additional genes that modify these two base colors. The most common modifier creates point coloration of both red and black hairs, known as bay, which is classified as a base color as well. The vast range of all other coat colors are created by additional genes' action upon one of these three base colors.

- Chestnut/Sorrel: A red coat with no black. The mane and tail are the same shade of chestnut or lighter chestnut than the body coat. The main color variations are:
  - Liver Chestnut: very dark red chestnut coat. Sometimes a liver chestnut is also simply called "brown".
  - Light Chestnut: seldom-used term for a pale chestnut coat, mane, and tail
  - Flaxen Chestnut: Any shade of chestnut, with a significantly lighter mane and tail

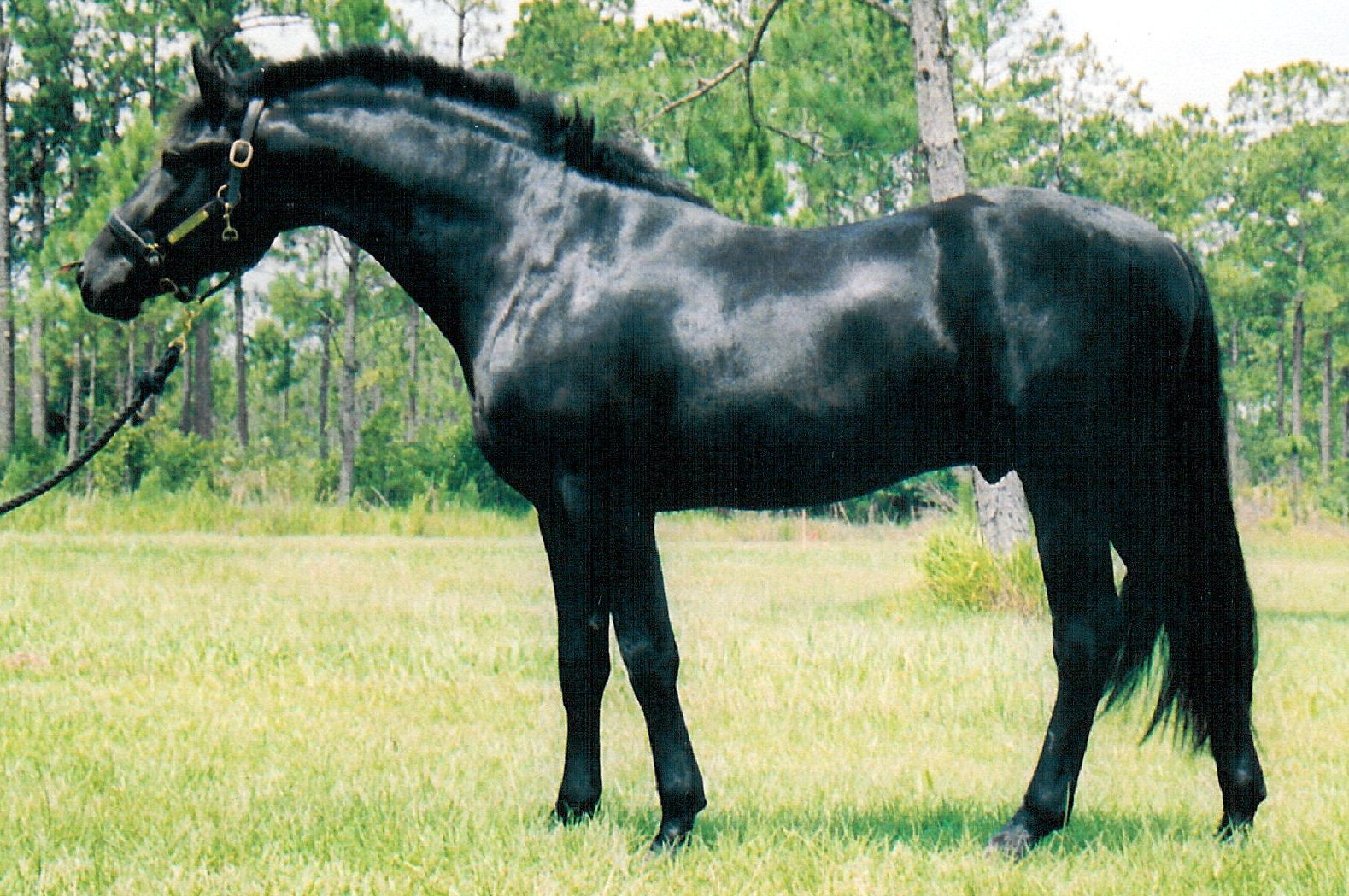
A black coat

- Black: Black is relatively uncommon, though it is not "rare". There may be two types of black: fading black and non-fading black. Many, though not all, black horses will fade to a brownish color if the horse is exposed to sunlight regularly. This may be due to nutrition or genetics. Some horses appear to have a non-fading black coat that does not fade in the sun. Most black foals are usually born a mousy grey color resembling grullo. As their foal coat begins to shed out, their black color will show through. For a horse to be considered black, it must be completely black except for white markings. A sun-bleached black horse is still called a black horse, even though it may appear to be a dark bay or brown. A visible difference between a black and a dark chestnut or bay is seen in the fine hairs around the eyes and muzzle. On a black these hairs are black, even if the horse is sun-bleached; on other colors, they will be lighter. The hairs around the coronet band of the hoof will be black on a black horse, but on a chestnut (no matter the shade) they will always be red.
- Bay: Body color ranges from a light reddish-brown to rich chocolate brown with black points: the mane, tail, lower legs, and tips of the ears. The terminology for various color variations are:
  - Dark Bay: a dark brown or dark reddish-brown coat with black points, difficult to distinguish from seal brown. Sometimes also called "black bay" or "mahogany bay."
  - Blood Bay/Red Bay: a bright red chestnut coat with black points
  - Brown: The word "brown" is used by some breed registries to describe dark bays. Informally, "brown" is applied to many distinct coat colors. Most often, horses described by casual observers as "brown" are actually bay or chestnut.

In the absence of DNA testing, chestnut and bay can be distinguished from each other by looking at the mane, tail and legs for the presence of black points. There is a proposed allele that darkens a bay coat to seal brown, and the sooty gene is linked to other forms of dark bay.

Genetically, a chestnut horse is a horse without the ability to produce black pigment, while a black horse does not have dominant agouti to restrict their black pigment to points. The MC1R (extension) either binds alpha-MSH and signals for black and red pigment to be produced ('E' at extension), or it only signals for red ('e' at extension). ASIP (agouti) either blocks MC1R from binding to alpha-MSH and signaling for black ('A' at agouti), or it does not ('a' at agouti). The extension gene determines whether the cells can decide to produce black and red, and can be either E (able to produce black and red) or e (only able to produce red, as in chestnut). To be chestnut, a horse must have two copies of e, so the genotype is e/e. A horse with a genotype of E/E or E/e can still make black and red pigments and will be bay or black. Meanwhile, the agouti gene determines whether the cells can stop producing black. The A version of agouti means that it can, so as long as has E at extension the base color will be bay. The a version of agouti means the cells cannot stop producing black, so a horse with two copies of a (genotype a/a) and E at extension will be black rather than bay.

== Points ==
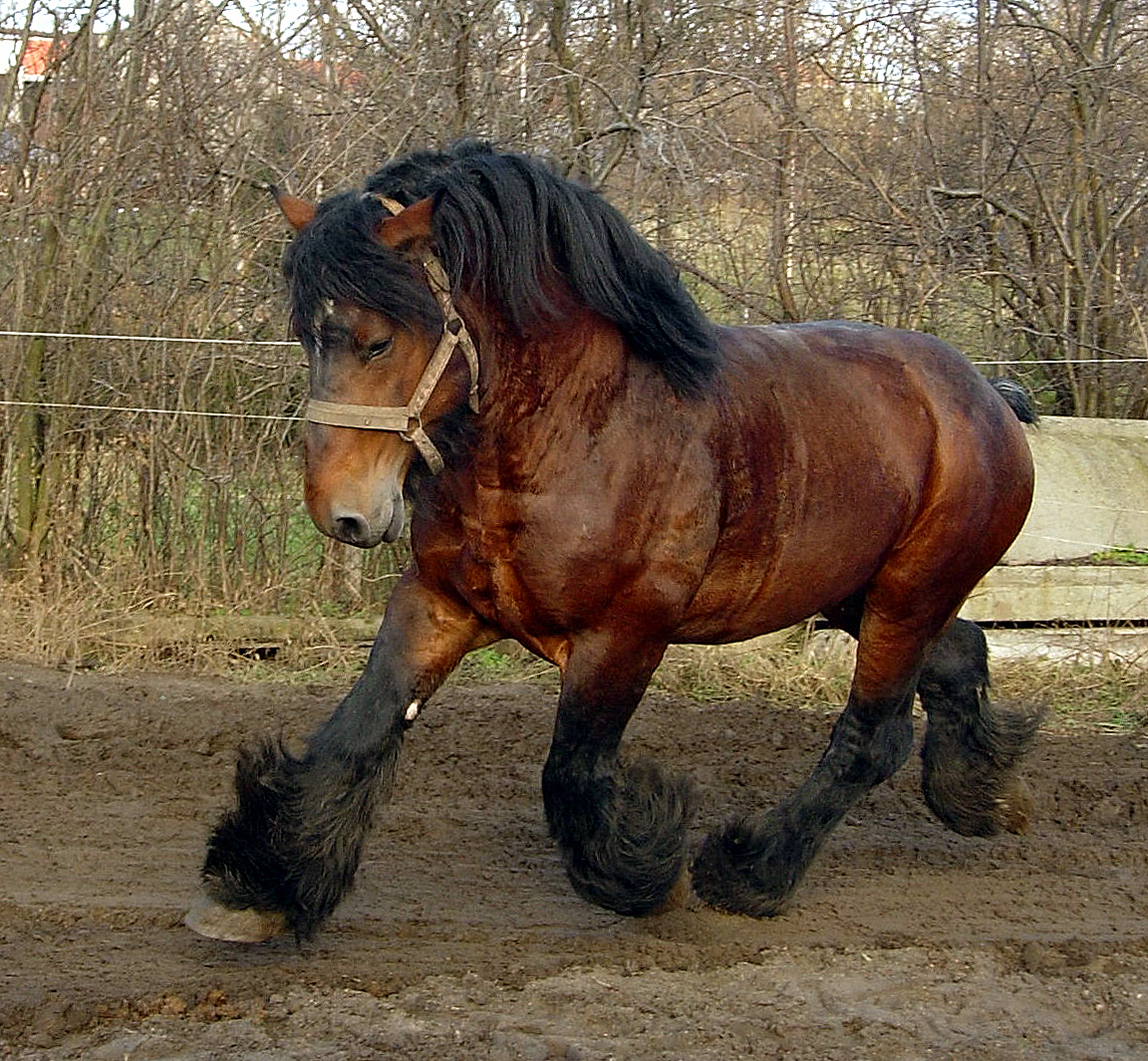
A bay horse, showing black points

The word "points" is given to the mane, tail, lower legs, and ear rims with respect to horse coloration. The overall name given to a horse's coat color depends on the color of both the points and the body. For example, bay horses have a reddish-brown body with black points.

Point coloration is most often produced by the action of the agouti gene. It acts on the extension gene, when present, to suppress black color to all but the extremities of the horse; the legs, mane, tail and tips of the ears. If the extension gene is not present, the effect of agouti is not visible, as there is no black color present to suppress.

Other genes, such as those for white markings, may affect a horse's coat color in addition to agouti, and if present, can further alter or suppress black hair color and may mask any point coloration. In particular, Gray horses are born dark and lighten with age; if born bay, they will eventually lose point coloration as the body hair silvers with age, though often the points are the slowest areas of the body to go gray.

Point coloration may also be visible on horses with other dilution genes that act upon a bay base coat. These include:

- The cream gene, an incomplete dominant, that when heterozygous produces Buckskin. When homozygous, even point coloration is mostly suppressed, the color is called perlino, and some individuals may have slightly redder hair at the traditional point coloration locations.
- The Champagne gene, which on a bay base produces Amber Champagne.

A dilution gene that produces what looks like point coloration, but from a completely different genetic mechanism is the dominant Dun gene, which dilutes the color of the body coat but not the points, including primitive markings—a dorsal stripe down the back and, less often, horizontal striping on the upper legs. On a bay base coat, the dun gene leaves black points, producing a Bay Dun or "Zebra" Dun. But the gene also leaves the points dark when it appears with other base colors. These include the “blue dun” or grullo, which has a black base coat, and the red dun, which has a chestnut base coat.

Similarly, darker coloration at the points is also preserved in horses with the roan gene, a patterning gene, producing a body coat of mingled white and dark hairs, but leaving the points the darker base color in all horses, not just those carrying agouti.

Most other genes that produce spotting patterns or white markings allow point coloration produced by agouti to show except where masked by white depigmentation. There are not always separate names for a pattern over a bay base coat, but one exception is the Bay pinto, sometimes called "tricolored".

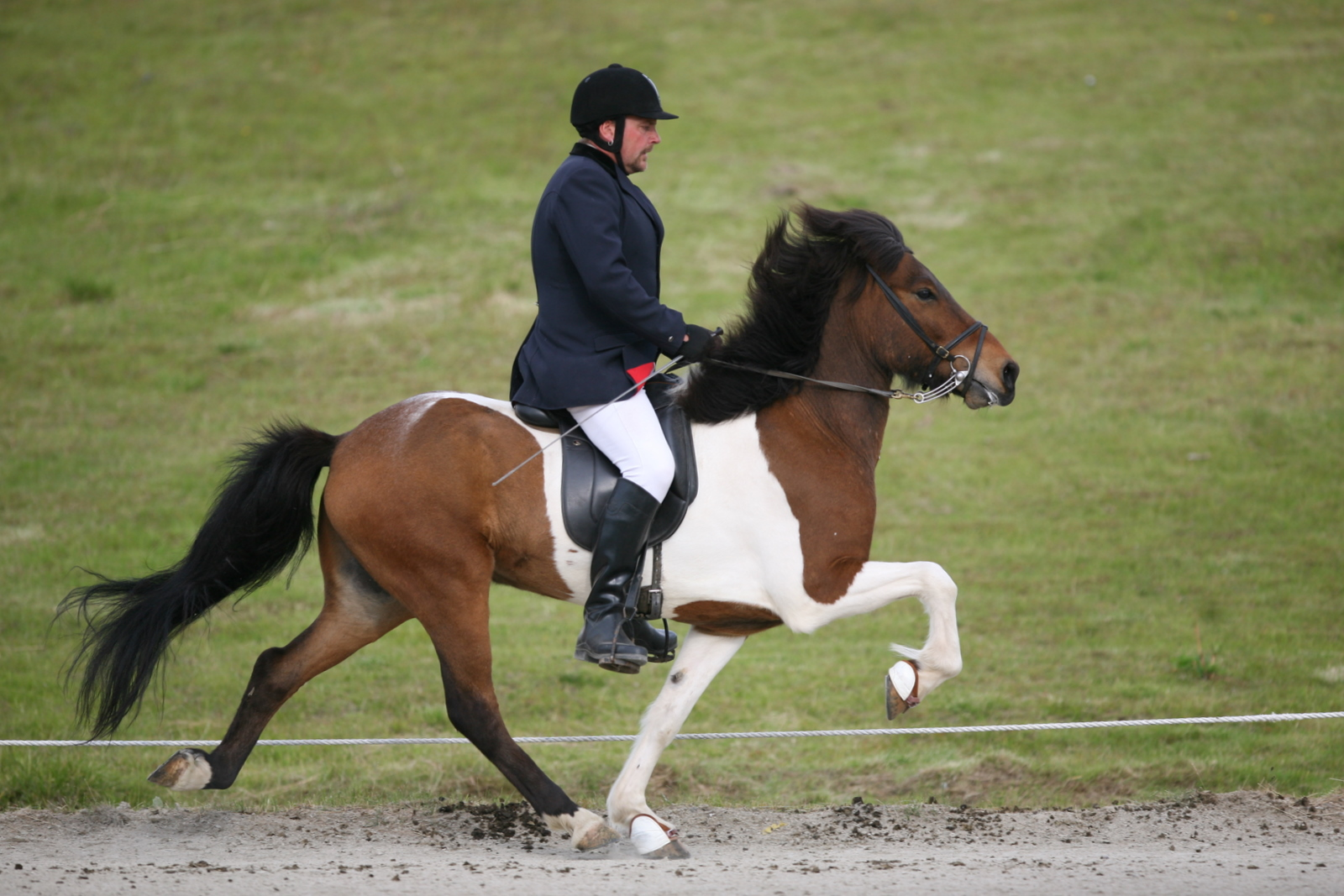
White markings may partially or completely mask point coloration in horses

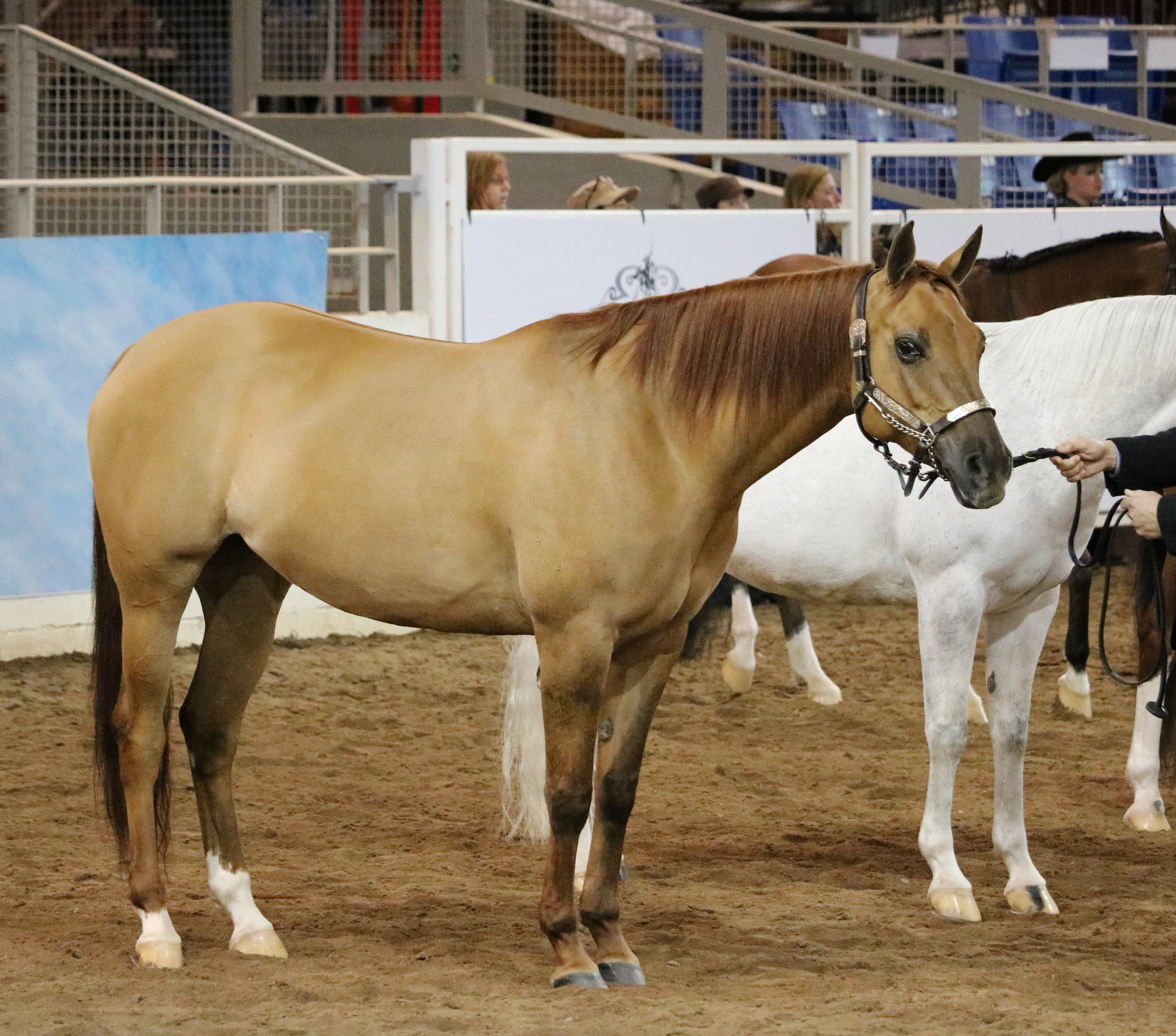
The dun gene leaves the points darker on all base coat colors, not just when agouti is present

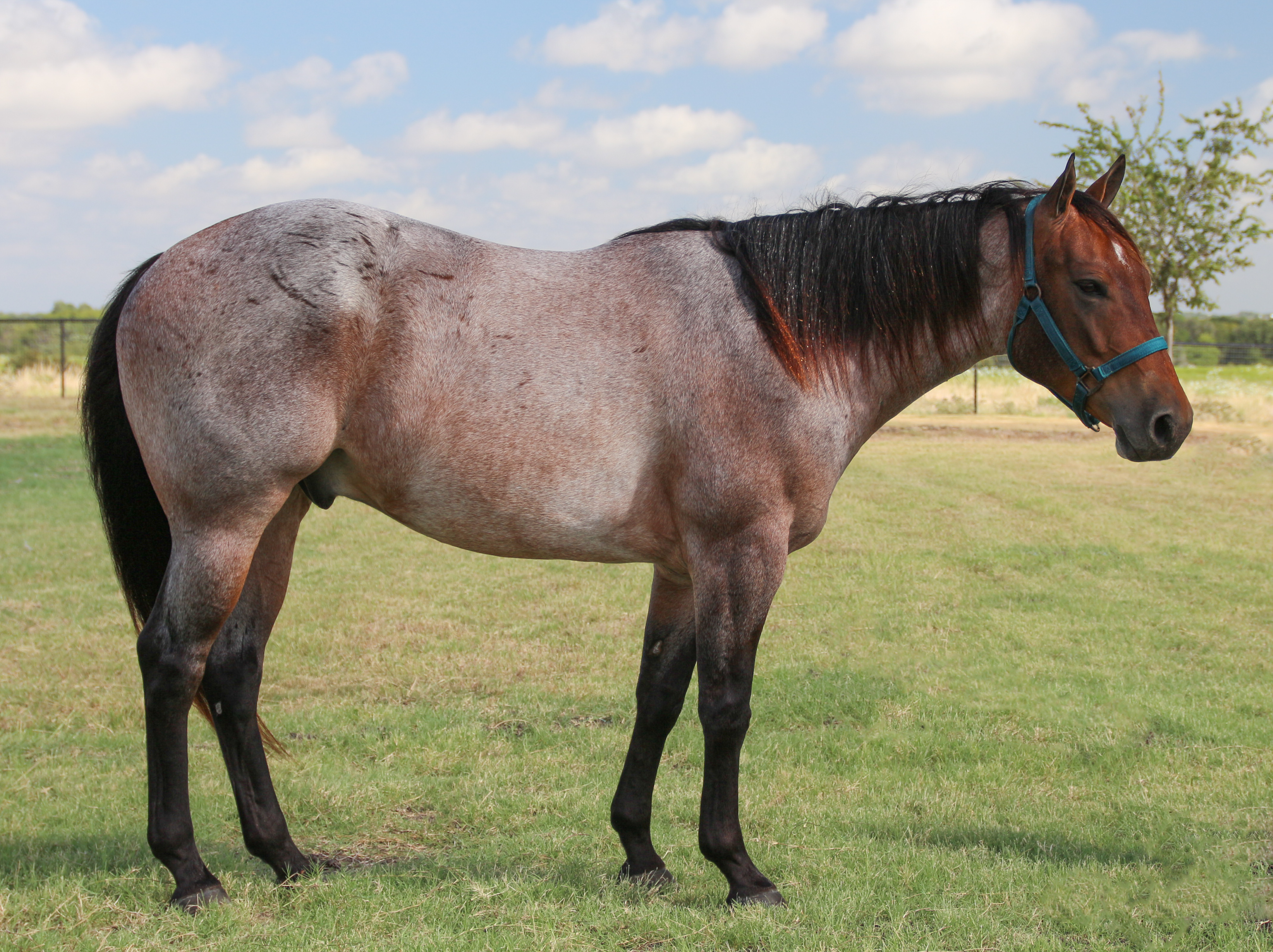
The roan pattern allows point coloration to show on the head as well as traditional point locations

== Gray ==
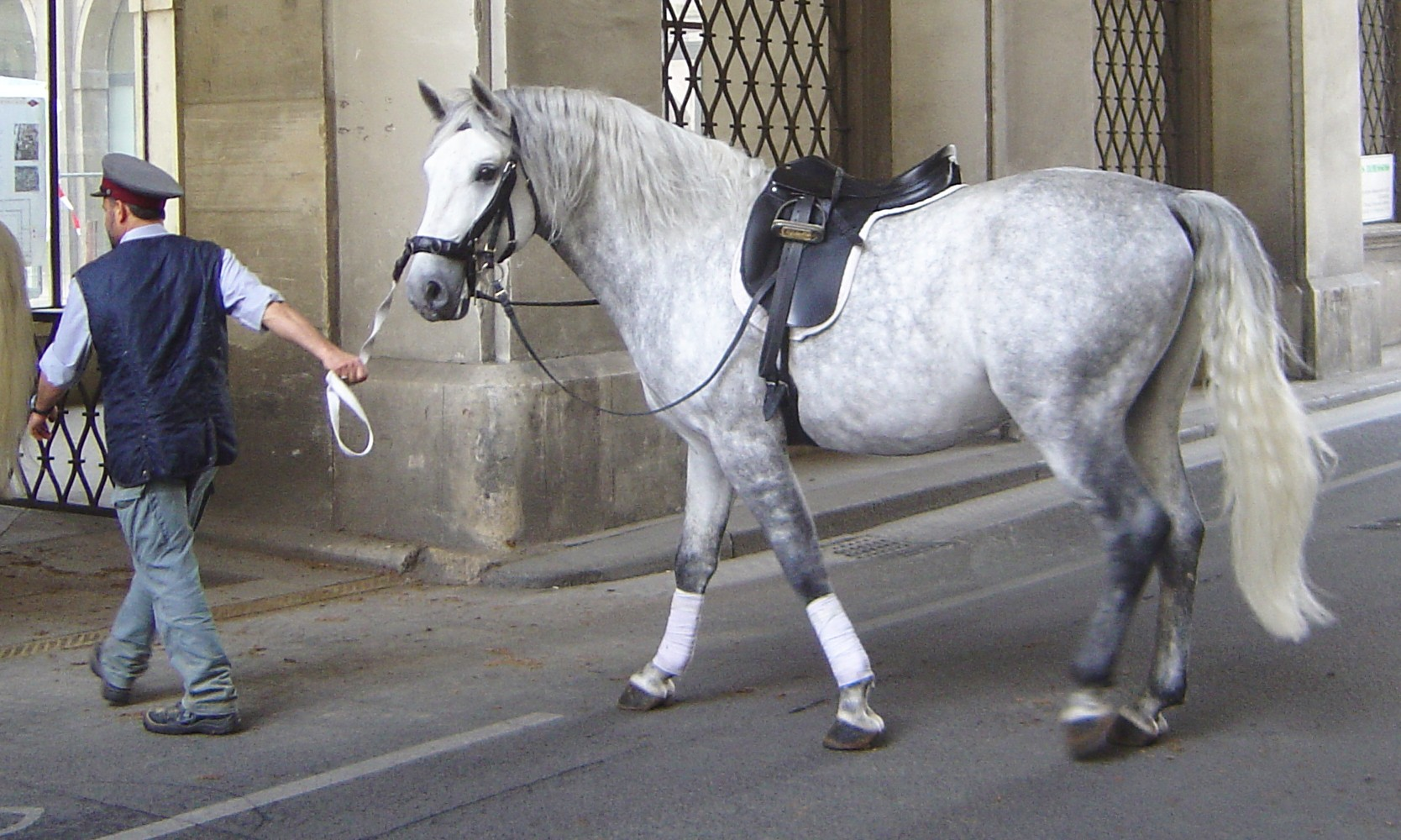
Dapple gray

A gray horse can be born any color, but as it gets older, some hairs turn white. Most will eventually develop a complete white or a "fleabitten" coat, which retains speckles of the horse's original color. Grays are sometimes confused with certain roan, dun, or white coat colors. In particular, most "white" horses are actually grays with a fully white hair coat. A gray horse is usually distinguishable from a dominant white or a cremello horse by dark skin, particularly noticeable around the eyes, muzzle, flanks, and other areas of thin or no hair. A roan has intermixed light and dark hairs similar to a young gray horse, but unlike a gray does not lighten to white. Dun horses have a solid-colored hair coat that also does not lighten with age. Gray horses are prone to equine melanoma.

Variations of gray that a horse may exhibit over its lifetime include:

- Steel Grey/Iron Grey: A grey horse with intermingled black and white hairs. This color occurs in a horse born black, or in some cases, dark bay, and slowly lightens as the horse ages.
- Rose Grey: A grey horse with a reddish or pinkish tinge to its coat. This color occurs in a horse born bay or chestnut and slowly lightens as the horse ages.
- Dapple Grey: Grey coat with lighter rings of grey hairs, called dapples, scattered throughout. Will eventually fade to a pure white or fleabitten coat.
- Fleabitten Grey: an otherwise fully white-haired horse with red or dark grey dots flecked throughout the coat, sometimes extensively.

== Diluted colors ==
Several different genetic allelic families produce colors that are lighter versions of the base colors, caused by dilution genes.

=== Cream family ===
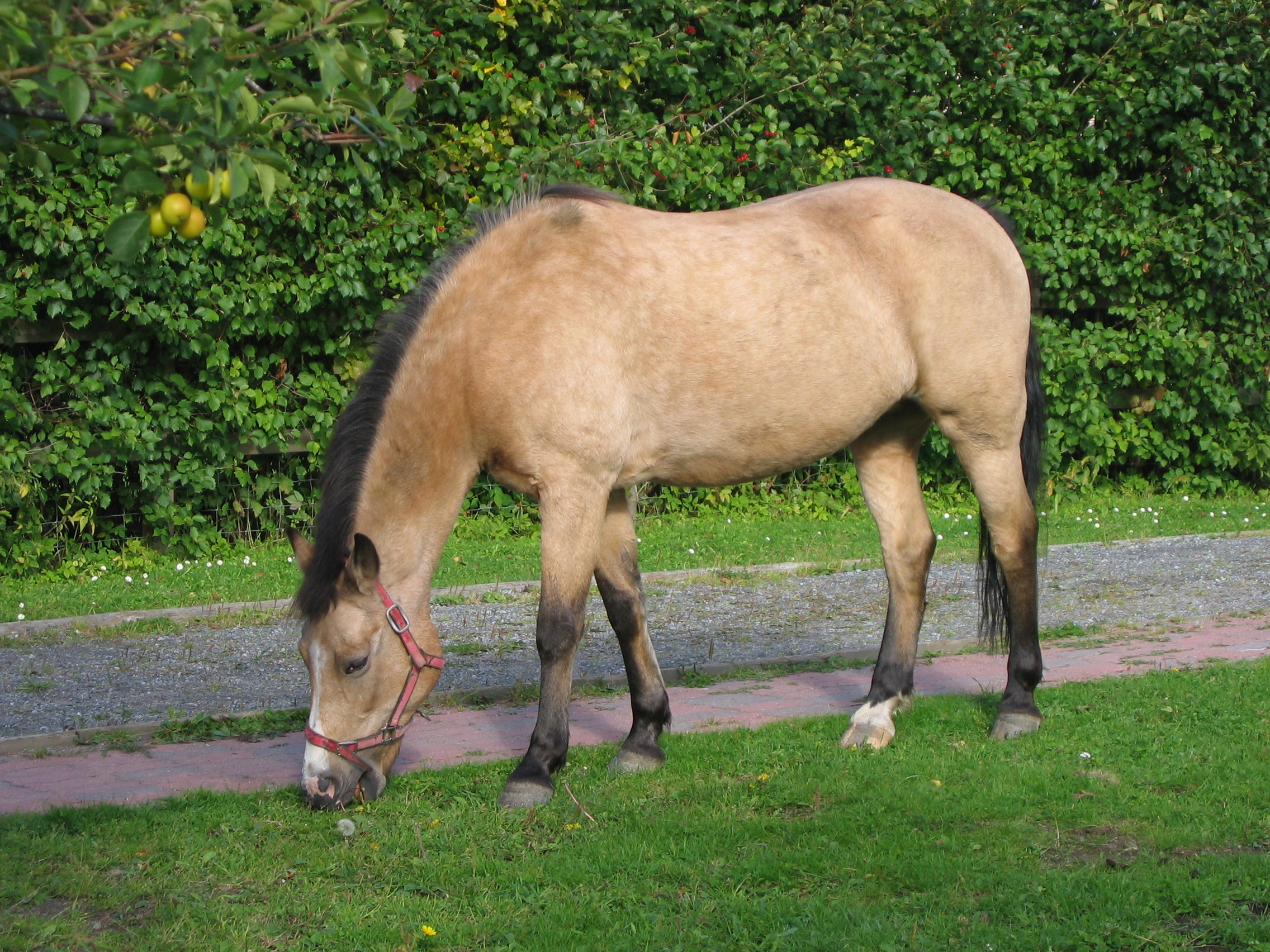
Buckskin

Cream dilution is an incomplete dominant gene that produces a lightened or "partial dilute" coat color when one copy of the allele is present and a fully dilute (or "double dilute") with two copies. The double cream dilute phenotypes overlap regardless of base coat color and often cannot be distinguished visually. Sometimes the creme allele is combined with an unrelated dilution gene from another family, which creates a cremello-like coat. Such coloration is called a "pseudo-double dilute." These distinctions usually require DNA testing to verify which alleles are present.

- Cremello: A horse with a chestnut base coat and two cream genes that wash out almost all color until the horse is a pale cream or light tan color. Often called "white", they are not truly white horses, and they do not carry the white (W) gene. A cremello has blue eyes.

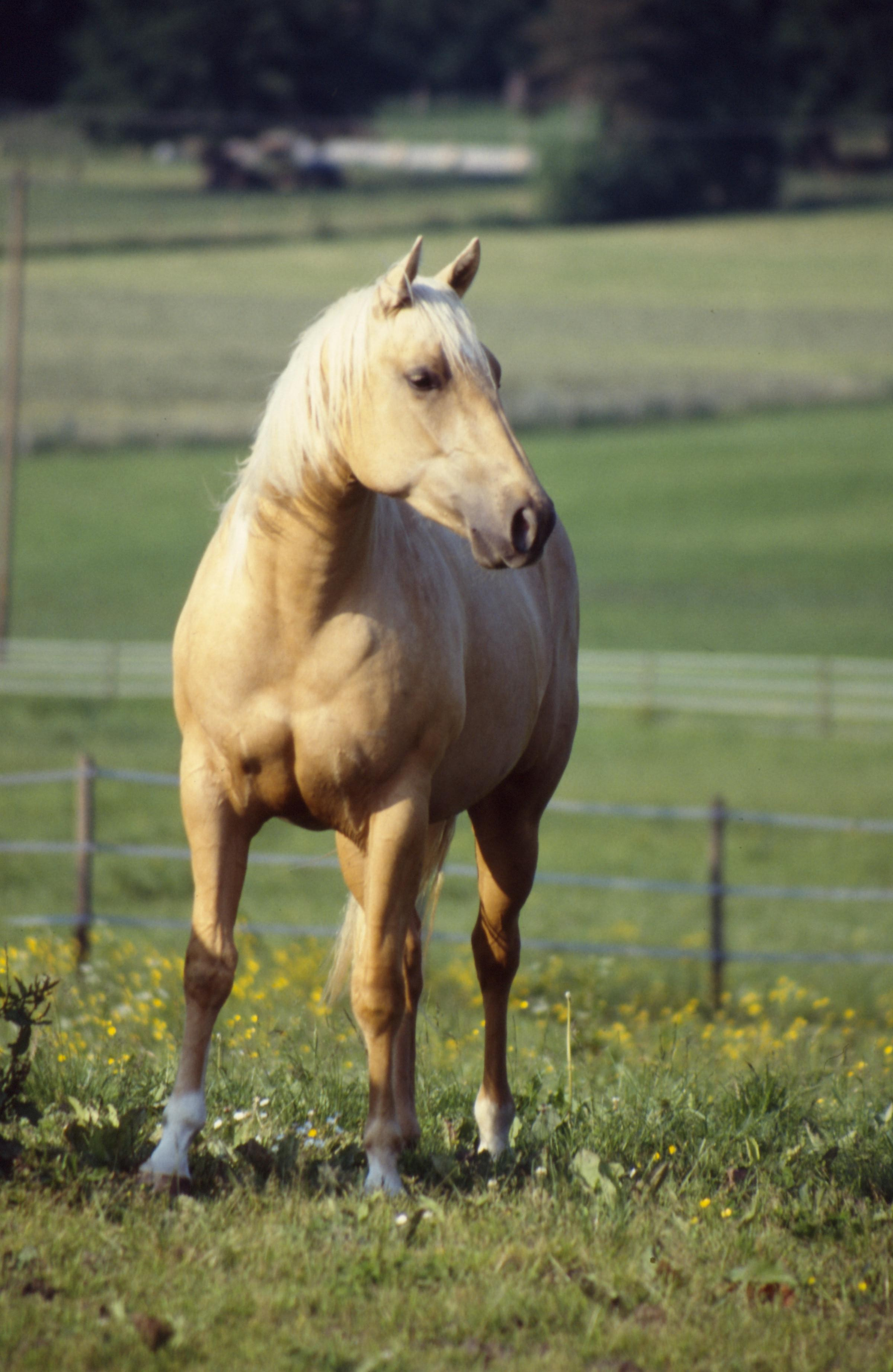
Palomino

- Buckskin: A bay horse with one copy of the cream gene, a dilution gene that "dilutes" or fades the coat color to a yellow, cream, or gold while keeping the black points (mane, tail, legs). They usually have brown eyes.
- Palomino: chestnut horse that has one cream dilution gene that turns the horse to a golden, yellow, or tan shade with a flaxen or white mane and tail. Often cited as being a color "of twenty-two carat gold", palominos range in shades from extremely light, almost cremello, to deep chocolate, but always with a white or flaxen mane and tail. They usually have brown eyes.
- Perlino: similar to a cremello, but is genetically a bay base coat with two dilute genes. Eyes are usually blue. Mane, tail and points are not black, but can sometimes be darker than the body coat, generally a reddish or rust color, though not to be confused with a red dun.
- Smoky black: A horse which visually appears to be only black, but actually has a black base coat and one copy of the cream gene.
- Smoky Cream: Virtually indistinguishable from a cremello or perlino without DNA testing, a horse with a black base coat and two copies of the cream gene.

=== Dun ===
- Dun is Yellowish or tan coat with primitive markings, sometimes called "dun factors": a darker-colored mane and tail, a dorsal stripe along the back and occasionally faint horizontal zebralike stripings on the upper legs and a possible transverse stripe across the withers. There are several variations:
  - Grulla, or Blue Dun: A horse with a black base color and the dun gene. Coat is a solid "mouse-colored" gray or silver (can also be almost brownish-gray) with black or dark gray primitive markings.
  - Red Dun: A chestnut base coat with dun factors. Coat is usually pale yellow or tan with chestnut (red) primitive markings.
  - "Bay Dun" or "Zebra dun" are terms sometimes used to describe the classic dun color of yellow or tan with black primitive markings, used when necessary to distinguish it from red duns or grullos.
  - "Buckskin dun" or "Dunskin" describes a bay dun that also carries the cream gene dilution and has a coat of pale gold with a black mane, tail, legs and primitive markings.

Mixtures of dilution genes produce colors such as "dunalino" — a red dun that also carries a single cream gene and thus has a pale gold coat, white mane and tail, and very faint primitive markings.

=== Other dilution genes ===
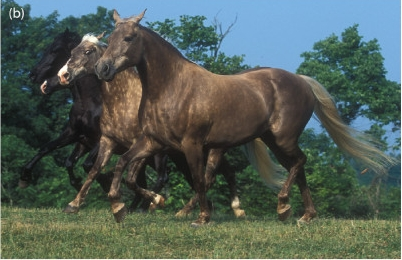
Silver dapple

- Champagne: Produced by a different dilution gene than the cream gene. It lightens both skin and hair, but creates a metallic gold coat color with mottled skin and light-colored eyes. Champagne horses are often confused with palomino, cremello, dun, or buckskins.
- Mushroom dilutes red-based horses to a pale tan color, so far found only in Shetland ponies or ponies with Shetland influence.
- Pearl: Also called the "barlink factor", A dilution gene that when homozygous, lightens red coats to a uniform apricot color, often also resulting in horses with blue eyes. When combined with cream dilution, it may produce horses that appear to be cremello or perlino.
- Silver or silver dapple: Caused by a dilution gene that only acts upon black hair pigment, it lightens black body hair to a chocolate brown and the mane and tail to silver in most cases. The gene may be carried but will not be visible on horses with a red base coat. Silver horses have informally been called Chocolate, Flaxen, or Taffy.

== White spotting patterns ==
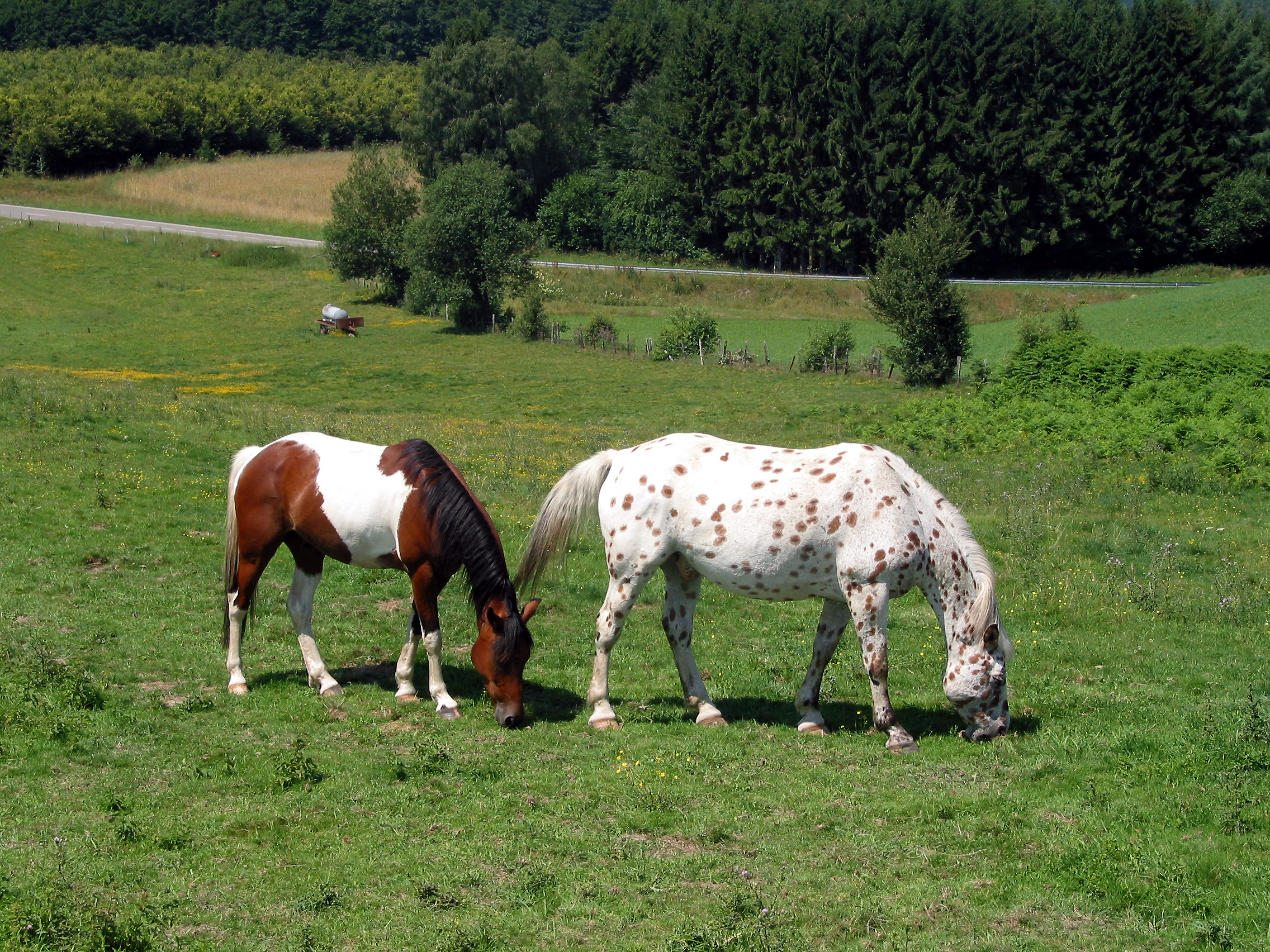
Pinto (left), leopard (right)

These patterns all have white hairs and often pink skin, varying from a fully white horse through the pinto patterns and smaller white markings to roan which only adds a few white hairs spread throughout the coat. These patterns can occur on top of any other color. The base color determines the color of the colored hairs, while the white patterns determine where and how many white hairs are present. Biologically, the white comes from a lack of pigment cells. Many different genetic alleles create these patterns.

=== Leopard complex ===
There are a group of coat patterns caused by the leopard gene complex. Not every horse with leopard genetics will exhibit hair coat spotting. However, even solid individuals will exhibit secondary characteristics such as vertically striped hooves and mottled skin around the eyes, lips, and genitalia, plus a white sclera of the eye. Several breeds of horse can boast leopard-spotted (a term used collectively for all patterns) individuals including the Knabstrupper, Noriker, and the Appaloosa. There are several distinct leopard patterns:

- blanket: white over the hip that may extend from the tail to the base of the neck. The spots inside the blanket (if present) are the same color as the horse's base coat.
- varnish roan: a mix of body and white hairs that extends over the entire body—no relation to genetic roan.
- snowflake: white spots on a dark body. Typically the white spots increase in number and size as the horse ages.
- leopard: dark spots of varying sizes over a white body.
- few spot leopard: a nearly white horse from birth that retains color just above the hooves, the knees, "armpits", mane and tail, wind pipe, and face.
- frost: similar to varnish but the white hairs are limited to the back, loins, and neck.

=== Pinto ===
A pinto has large patches of white over any other underlying coat color. Sometimes called "Paint" in the western United States, a word that which technically refers to the American Paint Horse, a specific breed of mostly pinto horses with known Quarter Horse and/or Thoroughbred bloodlines. Other regional terms for certain pinto spotting patterns include "blagdon" in the UK. Pinto spotting is produced by a large number of genetic mechanisms, with dozens now mapped and identifiable through DNA testing.

Variations of pinto based on the observable color include:

- Piebald: a black-and-white (term more commonly used in the UK than the US). This is pinto spotting on top of black.
- Skewbald: a spotting pattern of white over chestnut or any other color other than black (term more commonly used in the UK than the US).
- Tricolored: A variation of Skewbald, specifically referring to pinto spotting over a bay base coat or other coat color that features black points.

Terminology variations based on the observable shape of the white patterns include:

- Overo: Describes a group of spotting patterns genetically distinct from one another, characterized by sharp, irregular markings with a horizontal orientation, usually more dark than white. In some cases, the face is usually white, often with blue eyes. The white rarely crosses the back, and the lower legs are normally dark. Variations include "frame overo" and "splashed white".
- Sabino: Describes a range of spotting patterns characterized by high white on legs, belly spots, white markings on the face extending past the eyes and/or patches of roaning patterns standing alone, or on the edges of white markings. Usually produced by certain dominant white or "white spotting" alleles, though not all sabino patterns have been genetically mapped. Sometimes grouped with the overo color pattern group by breed registries that record spotting patterns even though created by different genetics from frame or splash.
- Tobiano: Spotting pattern characterized by rounded markings with white legs and white across the back between the withers and the dock of the tail, usually arranged in a roughly vertical pattern and more white than dark, with the head usually dark and with markings like that of a normal horse. i.e. star, snip, strip, or blaze. Produced by the Tobiano (TO) gene.
- Tovero: spotting pattern that is a mix of tobiano and overo coloration, such as blue eyes on a dark head, usually results from the presence of more than one spotting pattern gene.

=== Roaning ===
Roaning adds white hairs to any of the other colors and, unlike gray, the color does not steadily lighten over the horse's lifetime, though there may be some minor color variation from year to year or especially between summer and winter coats.

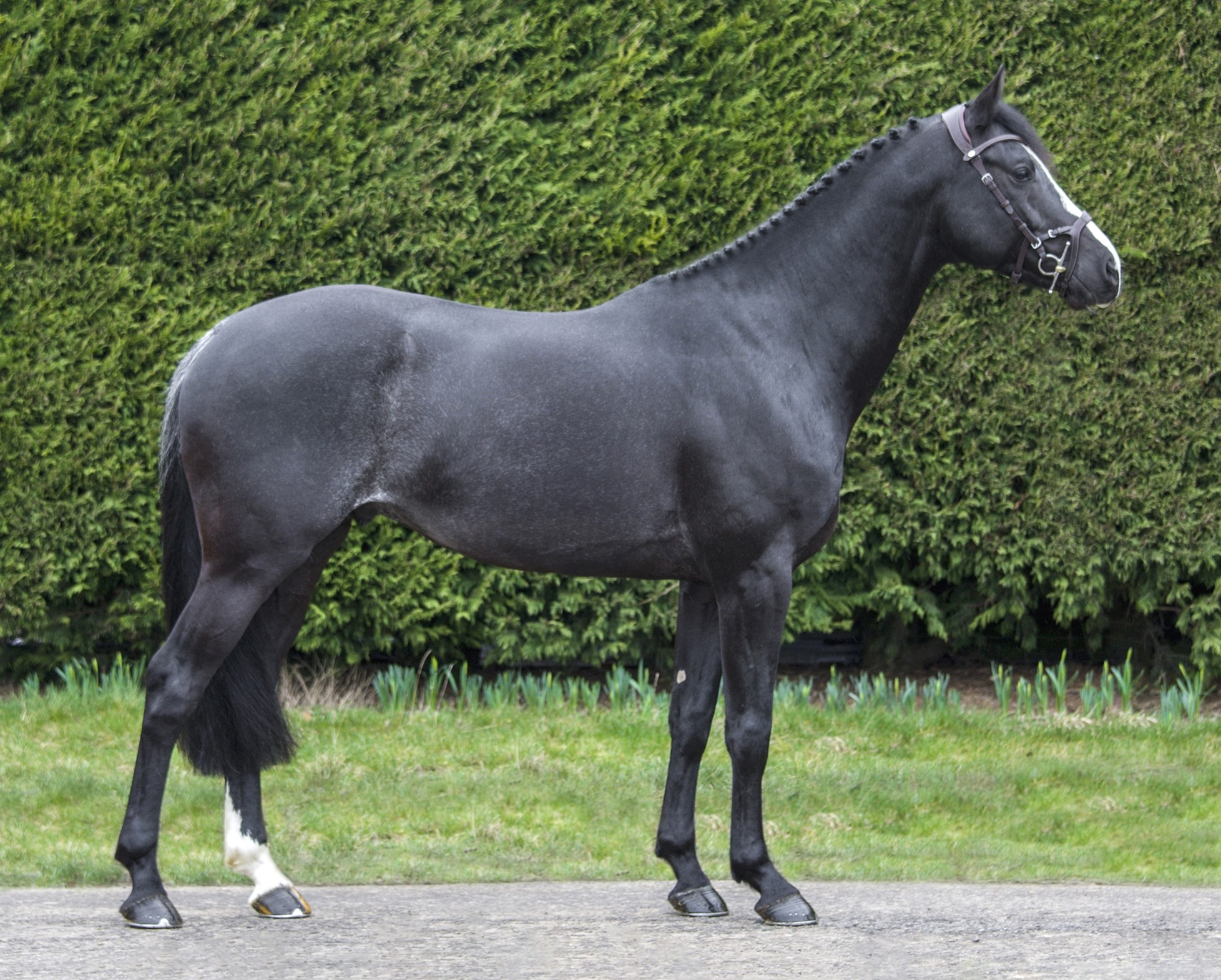
A black rabicano coat showing classic ticking on flanks and a white "skunk tail"

- Classic Roan: a color pattern that causes white hairs to be evenly intermixed within the horse's body color. Roans are distinguishable from greys because roans typically do not change color in their lifetimes, unlike gray, which gradually gets lighter as a horse ages. Roans also have heads that are either solid-colored or much darker than their body hair, and do not lighten. Variations of roan include:
  - Red Roan: A chestnut base coat with a roaning pattern, with the mane and tail being the same red as the body. Red roan is sometimes called Strawberry Roan, and the term Red Roan is occasionally used to describe a Bay Roan.
  - Bay Roan: A Bay base coat with a roaning pattern (the mane and tail of the Bay Roan will be Black). Bay roans are sometimes also called Red Roans.
  - Blue Roan: A black with a roaning pattern, not to be confused with a gray or a blue dun/grullo. A roan tends to have a darker head, while grays not only lighten with age, but their heads tend to lighten before the rest of their bodies. A blue roan has mixed-color hairs, a blue dun will usually be a solid color and have dun striping.

Rabicano: A roan-style effect that is caused by a yet-to-be-mapped genetic modifier that creates a mealy, splotchy, or roaning pattern on only part of the body, usually limited to the underside, flanks, legs, tail and head areas. Unlike a true roan, much of the body will not have white hairs intermingled with solid ones, nor are the legs or head significantly darker than the rest of the horse.

=== White ===
One of the rarest colors, a true genetic white horse has white hair and fully or largely unpigmented (pink) skin. These horses are born white or mostly white and remain white for life. The vast majority of so-called "white" horses are actually grays with a fully white hair coat. A truly white horse occurs one of two ways: either by inheriting one copy of a dominant white ("W") allele that produces white when heterozygous but may be a genetic lethal if homozygous, or by inheriting two copies of a non-lethal dominant white ("W") allele that produces a white coat when homozygous. There are also some genetic lethal genes unrelated to the W allelic series: a foal homozygous for the frame overo gene will have a condition known as lethal white syndrome dies shortly after birth.

There are no "albinos" in the horse world. Albinos, defined as animals with a white coat with pink skin and reddish eyes, are created by genetic mechanisms that do not exist in horses. In some cases, homozygous dominant white (W) is thought to be an embryonic lethal, though this does not occur with all W alleles.

=== White markings ===
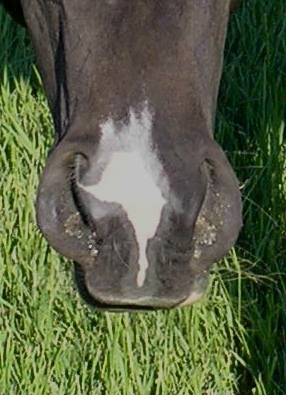
A white marking, such as the large snip on this horse's muzzle, usually has pink skin underneath it, except on the edges.

White markings are present at birth and unique to each horse, making them useful in identifying individual animals. Markings usually have pink skin underneath them, though some faint markings may not, and white hairs may extend past the area of underlying pink skin. Though markings that overlie dark skin may appear to change, the underlying skin color and hair growing from pink skin will not. The distinction when white markings confined to the face and legs or a few small body spots become extensive enough to constitute a white spotting pattern is usually determined by breed standards set by registries. White markings generally are now hypothesized to be a minimal expression of certain genes in the dominant white (W) allelic series.

== Other colors and modifiers ==
- Brindle: One of the rarest colors in horses, characteristics are any base coat color with "zebralike" stripes, but the most common is a brown horse with faint yellowish markings. Usually linked to chimerism, but one heritable brindle pattern that affects coat texture and color in a family of American Quarter Horses has been named Brindle1 was announced in 2016.
- Sooty is a proposed genetic modifier not yet mapped that causes dark hairs to be dispersed within the coat, darkening the whole coat with age.
- Pangaré or mealy is a modifier that is the opposite of sooty, it causes individual hairs to lighten, causing lightened areas on the muzzle, flank and belly of a horse.
- "Flaxen" is used only to describe the lightened mane and tail of a chestnut, and has been proposed as a genetic modifier, particularly when it appears to be a trait of certain breeds. However, the genetic mechanism of this process has yet to be identified.
- Primitive marking variants sometimes called "bider markings" have been seen in Przewalski's horses and Mongolian horses.

== Eye and hoof color ==
Most horses have brown eyes with minor shade variations. Blue eyes are linked to the splashed white spotting allele, and cream dilution may produce a bluish-green eye color. The champagne and pearl genes also produce lightened eye colors in the blue or green shades. The leopard complex produces a white sclera around an otherwise dark eye.

The yellow or amber Tiger eye gene has been found only in the Puerto Rican Paso Fino and has two variants, Tiger-eye 1 (TE1) and Tiger-eye 2 (TE2), which are both recessive. There is no obvious link between eye shade and coat color, making this the first studied gene in horses to affect eye color but not coat color.

Exterior hoof wall color is usually linked to coat color. Most horses have a dark grayish hoof wall unless they have white leg markings, in which case they will have pale-colored hooves. The leopard complex gene will create a light and dark striped hoof, and many chestnut horses have brownish hooves that are somewhat lighter than the usual dark gray.

== Color breeds ==
Registries have opened that accept horses (and sometimes ponies and mules) of almost any breed or type, with color either the only requirement for registration or the primary criterion. These are called "color breeds". Unlike "true" horse breeds, there are few, if any, unique physical characteristics required, nor is the stud book limited to only certain breeds or offspring of previously registered horses. As a general rule, offspring without the stated color are usually not eligible for recording with the color breed registry, although there are exceptions. The best-known color breed registries are for buckskins, palominos, and pintos.

Some horse breeds may have a desired coat color that usually breeds on as a characteristic that is part of the breed standard, in addition to distinctive physical characteristics and a limited stud book. They are not color breeds, and include the Friesian horse (must be uniformly black for mainstream registration), the Appaloosa (with Leopard complex patterns) and the American Paint Horse. In some of these breeds, though not all, offspring of animals registered in these stud books may be registered even if they do not have the desired color, sometimes with restrictions.
