= Gray horse =

Coat color characterized by progressive depigmentation of the colored hairs of the coat

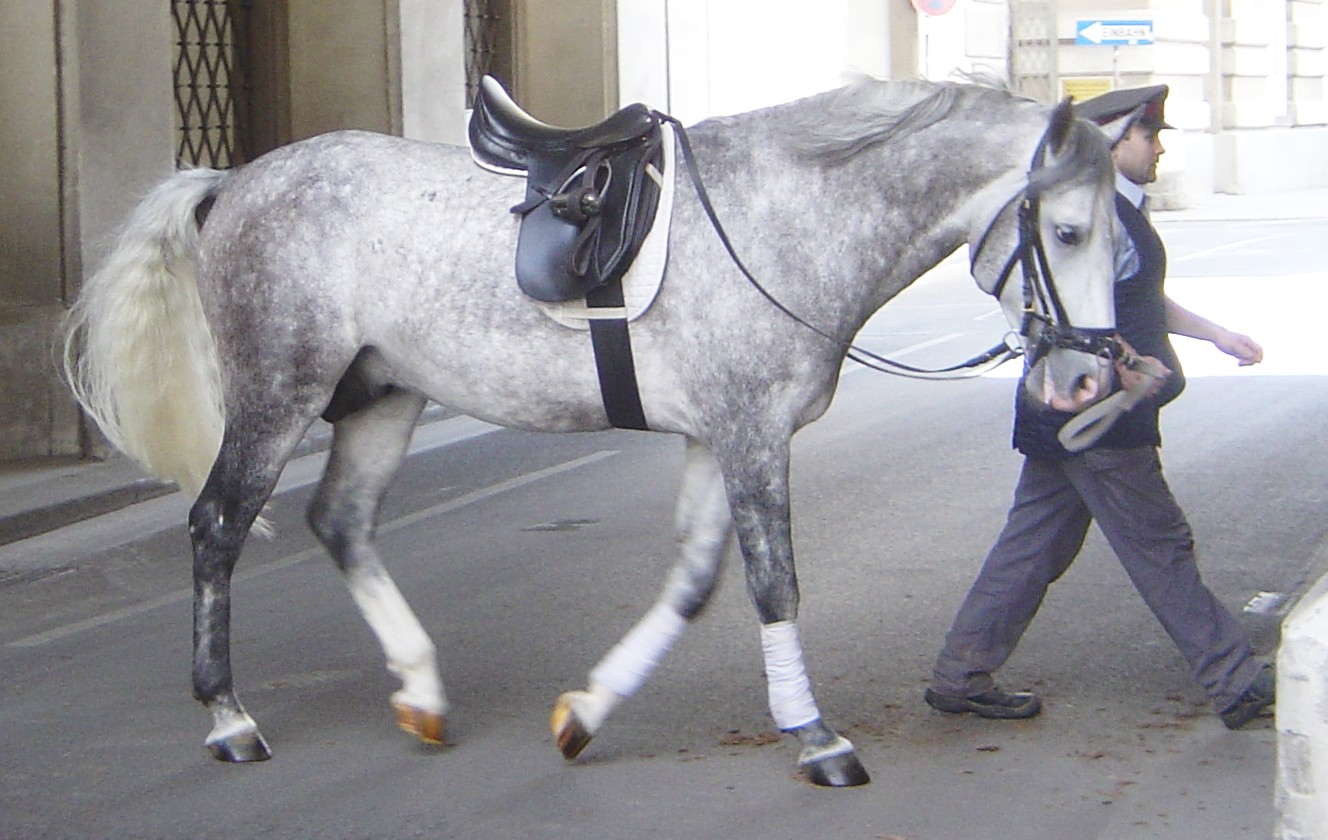
- A young gray Lipizzan horse. Grays are typically born a darker color, but their coat will be completely or almost completely white by 6-12 years of age
- Other names: Grey
- Variants: dapple gray; flea-bitten gray; iron gray; rose gray

Genotype
- Base color: Any
- Modifying genes: Graying gene (G) dominant

Phenotype
- Body: Born any color, lightens with age until fully white, may develop pigmented speckles
- Head and Legs: Head is usually the first part of body to lighten, legs may be among last parts of body to lighten
- Mane and tail: May not gray at same rate as body, can be lighter or darker
- Skin: Usually black, except under white markings present at birth.
- Eyes: Usually dark brown, unless affected by other genes which lighten eye color
- Other notes: When gray gene is present, horse will always become gray, may be masked by white genetics

A gray horse (or grey horse) has a coat color characterized by progressive depigmentation of the colored hairs of the coat. Most gray horses have black skin and dark eyes; unlike some equine dilution genes and some other genes that lead to depigmentation, gray does not affect skin or eye color. Gray horses may be born any base color, depending on other color genes present. White hairs begin to appear at or shortly after birth and become progressively more prevalent as the horse ages as white hairs become intermingled with hairs of other colors. Graying can occur at different rates—very quickly on one horse and very slowly on another. As adults, most gray horses eventually become completely white, though some retain intermixed light and dark hairs.

The stages of graying vary widely. Some horses develop a dappled pattern for a period of time, others resemble a roan with more uniform intermixing of light and dark hairs. As they age, some gray horses, particularly those heterozygous for the gray gene, may develop pigmented speckles in addition to a white coat, a pattern colloquially called a "fleabitten gray."

Gray horses appear in many breeds, though the color is most commonly seen in breeds descended from Arabian ancestors. Some breeds that have large numbers of gray-colored horses include the Thoroughbred, the Arabian, the American Quarter Horse and the Welsh pony. Breeds with a very high prevalence of gray include the Percheron, the Andalusian, and the Lipizzaner.

People who are unfamiliar with horses may refer to gray horses as "white". However, a gray horse whose hair coat is completely "white" will still have black skin (except under markings that were white at birth) and dark eyes. This is how to discern a gray horse from a white horse. White horses usually have pink skin and sometimes even have blue eyes. Young horses with hair coats consisting of a mixture of colored and gray or white hairs are sometimes confused with roan. Some horses that carry dilution genes may also be confused with white or gray.

While gray is classified as a coat color by breed registries, genetically it may be more correct to call it a depigmentation pattern. It is a dominant allele, and thus a horse needs only one copy of the gray allele, that is, heterozygous, to be gray in color. A homozygous gray horse, one carrying two gray alleles, will always produce gray foals.

== Prevalence ==
Gray is common in many breeds. Today, about one horse in 10 carries the mutation for graying with age. The vast majority of Lipizzaners are gray, as are the majority of Andalusian horses. Many breeds of French draft horse such as the Percheron and Boulonnais are often gray as well. Gray is also found among Welsh Ponies, Thoroughbreds, and American Quarter Horses. All of these breeds have common ancestry in the Arabian horse. In particular, all gray Thoroughbreds descend from a horse named Alcock's Arabian, a gray born in 1700. The gray coat color makes up about 3% of Thoroughbreds.

Gray also affects spotting patterns of pintos and leopard complex horses such as Appaloosas. Its effects wash out the contrast of the markings of these patterns, sometimes colloquially described as "ghosting."

== Changes in the color of gray horses ==
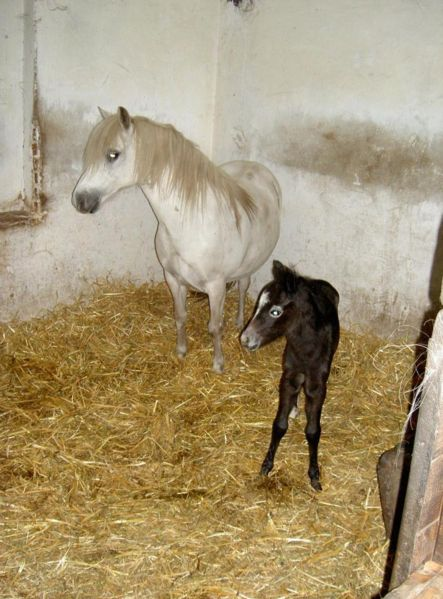
A gray mare with suckling foal. The mare has a white hair coat, but the underlying black skin confirms that she is gray and not white. The light hairs around the foal's muzzle and eyes indicate that it will gray like its mother. Not all foals show signs of graying this young.

A gray foal may be born any color. However, bay, chestnut, or black base colors are most often seen. As the horse matures, it "grays out" as white hairs begin to replace the base or birth color. Usually white hairs are first seen by the muzzle, eyes and flanks, occasionally at birth, and usually by the age of one year. Over time, white hairs replace the birth color. The changing patterns of white and dark hairs have many informal names, such as "rose gray," "salt and pepper," "iron gray", or "dapple gray." As the horse ages, the coat continues to lighten, often to a pure white. Some horses develop pigmented reddish-brown speckles on an otherwise white hair coat. Such horses are often called "fleabitten gray".

Different breeds, and individuals within each breed, take differing amounts of time to gray out. Thus, graying cannot be used to approximate the age of a horse except in the broadest of terms: a very young horse will never have a white coat (unless it is a true white horse), while a horse in its teens usually is completely grayed out. One must also be careful not to confuse the small amount of gray hairs that may appear on some older horses in their late teens or twenties, which do not reflect the gray gene and never cause a complete graying of the horse.

This change in hair color means that the same gray horse will appear to be a different color over time, sometimes resulting in a need to change the color noted on breed registry papers. Other times, people traveling with gray horses who have a pure white hair coat have encountered problems with non-horse-oriented officials such as police officers or border guards who are unclear about a horse who has papers saying it is "gray" when the horse in front of them appears white.

To further complicate matters, the skin and eyes may be other colors if influenced by other factors such as white markings, certain white spotting patterns or dilution genes.

Gray color changes
Name	Image	Description
Foals		Horses in their first year begin to show a few white hairs as their foal coat sheds. Some foals show gray hairs around their eye, muzzle and other "soft" areas at birth, others do not show white hairs until they are almost yearlings.
Young gray horses		An intermediate stage typically seen in young horses in the early stages of turning gray is when white hairs are mixed with the dark birth color. In horses born black or dark bay, the horse shows mostly black and white hairs intermingled on the body. This is sometimes called "salt and pepper", "iron gray", or "steel gray." This is the most common intermediate form of gray, which can give a silvery look to the coat. A reddish tinge, called a "rose gray", describes this intermediate stage for a horse born a chestnut or bright bay. Young horses just starting to gray out are sometimes confused with roans, but a gray continues to lighten with age, while a roan does not. Roaning also causes fewer white hairs on the legs and head, giving the horse the appearance of dark points, which is usually not true of gray.
Dapple gray		Light and dark areas form a dappled pattern of dark rings with lighter hairs on the inside of the ring, scattered over the entire body of the animal. Not all grays dapple, and it is an intermediate stage, usually seen in young adult horses, often considered highly attractive. The horse will continue to become lighter. Dappled grays should not be confused with the slight dappling "bloom" seen on horses of other colors that are in excellent condition, as "bloom" dapples disappear should the horse lose condition.
Late stage graying		As grays become lighter with age, a few areas, especially around the flanks and legs, retain some color
Complete depigmentation		Nearly all hairs are white. A horse at this stage may be done changing color, or may begin to develop fleabitten pigment. Gray horses with a completely white coat can be distinguished from a white horse by their underlying black skin, particularly around the eyes, muzzle, and genital area.
Fleabitten gray		Flea-bitten gray is a color consisting of a white hair coat with small pigmented speckles or "freckles". The flea-bitten pattern is seen primarily in heterozygous Grays. Most horses who become flea-bitten grays still go through a brief period when they are pure white. The amount of speckling varies between individuals and density of speckling may increase as the horse ages. Some horses may appear almost pure white, with only a few speckles observed on close examination. Others may have so many speckles that they are occasionally mistaken for a roan or even a type of sabino.
Blood marks		One unique form of gray, genetically related to flea-bitten gray, are "blood marks" or a "bloody shouldered" horse. This is an animal that is so heavily pigmented on certain parts of the body, usually the shoulder area, that it appears as an irregular, almost solid pattern—as if blood had been spilled on the horse, hence the name. Blood marks can change size and shape as the horse ages. Arabian horse breeders claim the Bedouin people considered the "bloody shoulder" to be a prized trait in a war mare and much desired.

== The genetics of gray ==
The gray gene (G) is an autosomal dominant gene. In simple terms, a horse which has even one copy of the gray allele, regardless of other coat color genes present, will always become gray. This also means that all gray horses must have at least one gray parent. If a gray horse is homozygous (GG), meaning that it has a gray allele from both parents, it will always produce gray offspring no matter the color genetics of the other parent. However, if a gray horse is heterozygous (Gg), meaning it inherits one copy of the recessive gene (g), that animal may produce offspring who are not gray, depending on the genetics of the other parent and Mendelian inheritance principles. Genetic testing is now possible to determine whether a horse is homozygous or heterozygous for gray. The gray gene does not affect skin or eye color, so grays typically have dark skin and eyes, as opposed to the unpigmented pink skin of white horses.

In 2008, researchers at Uppsala University in Sweden identified the genetic mutation that governs the graying process. The study revealed that all gray horses carry an identical mutation that can be traced back to a common ancestor that lived at least two thousand years ago. The discovery that gray can be linked to a single animal provides an example of how humans have "cherry-picked" attractive mutations in domestic animals. This study discovered that the cause graying is a 4.6 kilobase duplication in the STX17 gene.

Further research by researchers at Uppsala University and UC Davis Veterinary Genetics Laboratory in 2024 discovered two different graying alleles, G2 and G3, control the speed of graying and the risk of melanoma. The G2 allele is a duplication of the sequence within STX17 and leads to slow graying and less melanoma risk compared to the G3 allele which is a triplication and leads to fast graying and a high risk of melanoma. The G3 allele is much more prevalent across breeds, possibly from the selection for a distinct, all white pattern unrelated to white spotting. The G2 allele was specifically identified in 8 breeds: Andalusian, Connemara pony, Miniature horse, Mangalarga Marchador, Mustang, American Quarter Horse, Tennessee Walking Horse, and Welsh Pony.

Gray is controlled by a single dominant allele of a gene that regulates specific kinds of stem cells. Homozygous grays turn white faster, are more likely to develop melanomas, and are less prone to develop the "fleabitten" speckling than heterozygous grays.

Researchers suggest the pigmented speckles of the "fleabitten" gray, as well as more intense reddish-brown colored areas called "blood" markings, may be caused by a loss or inactivation of the gray allele in some of the somatic cells as that would explain why the speckles are more common on heterozygous grays than homozygotes.

=== Melanoma in gray horses ===
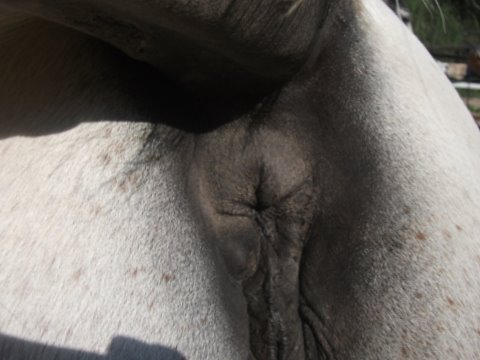
Perianal gray horse melanoma

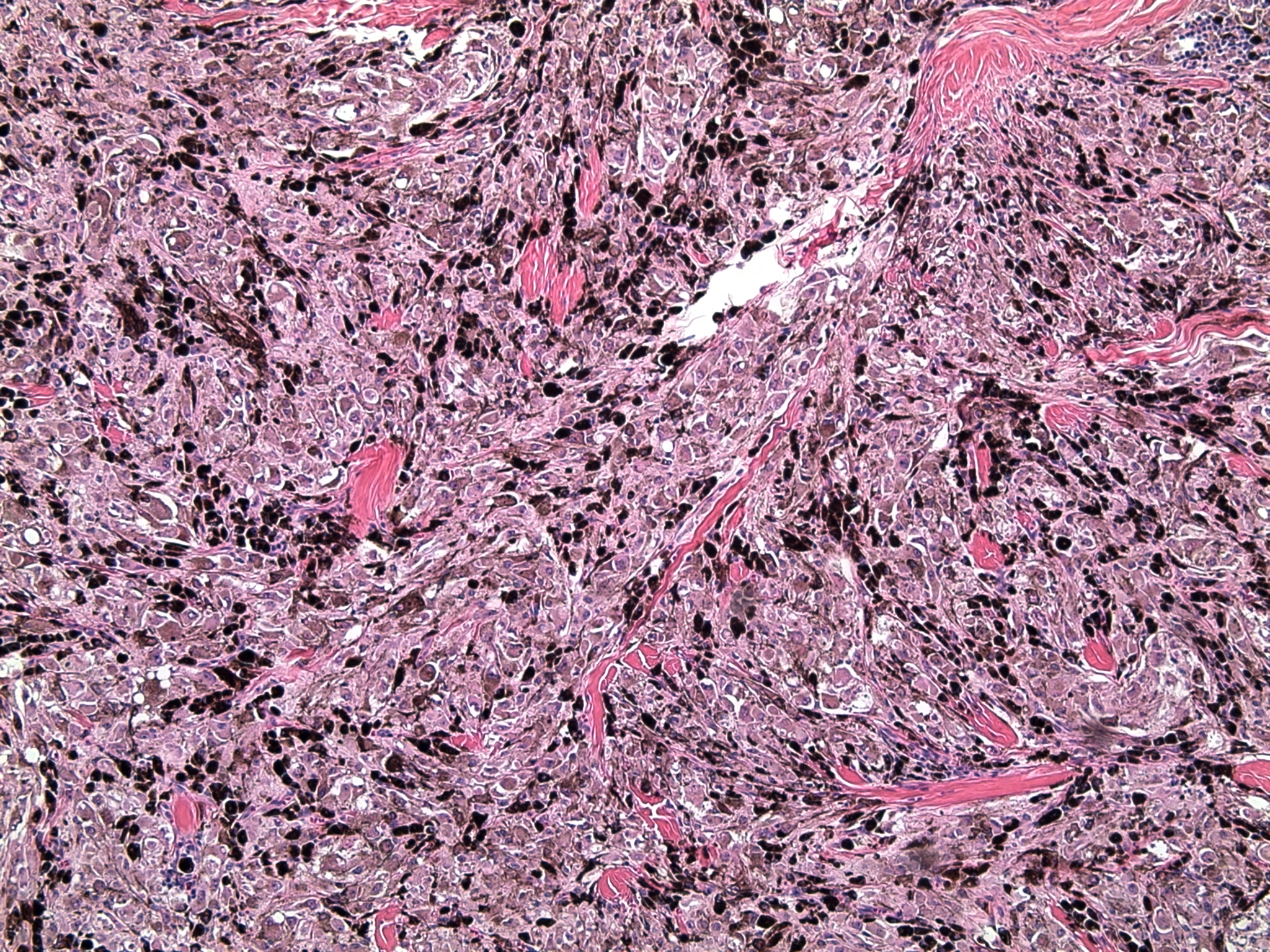
Perianal gray horse melanoma, histology of tumor

The identification of the gray mutation is of great interest in medical research since this mutation also increases the risk of melanoma in horses: some studies have suggested as many as 80% of grays over 15 years of age have some form of melanoma. Growth rate depends on the type, and many are slow-growing, but over time, many develop into a melanoma.

The study of gray genetics has pointed to a molecular pathway that may lead to tumour development. Both STX17 and the neighboring NR4A3 gene are overexpressed in melanomas from gray horses, and those carrying a loss-of-function mutation in ASIP (agouti signaling protein) had a higher incidence of melanoma, implying that increased melanocortin-1 receptor signaling promotes melanoma development in Gray horses. Some studies indicate as many as 66% of benign melanocytic proliferations become malignant, though other studies have found much lower rates, and in one case, zero.

== Horse coat colors sometimes confused with gray ==
=== White horses ===
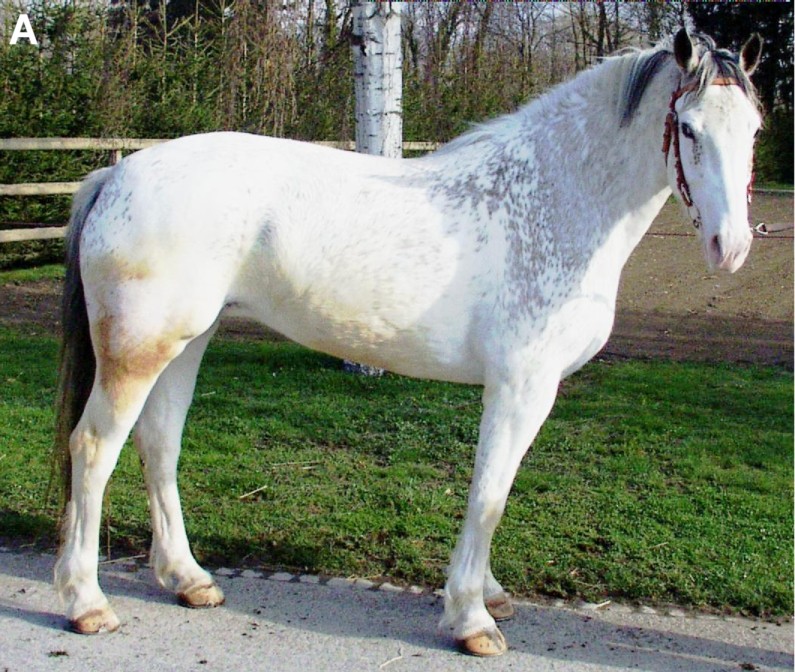
Gray horses are sometimes confused with dominant white horses

Many people who are unfamiliar with horses refer to a gray horse as "white". However, most white horses have pink skin and some have blue eyes. A horse with dark skin and dark eyes under a white hair coat is gray. However, a gray horse with an underlying homozygous cream base coat color may be born with rosy-pink skin, blue eyes and near-white hair. In such cases, DNA testing may clarify the genetics of the horse.

=== Roan ===
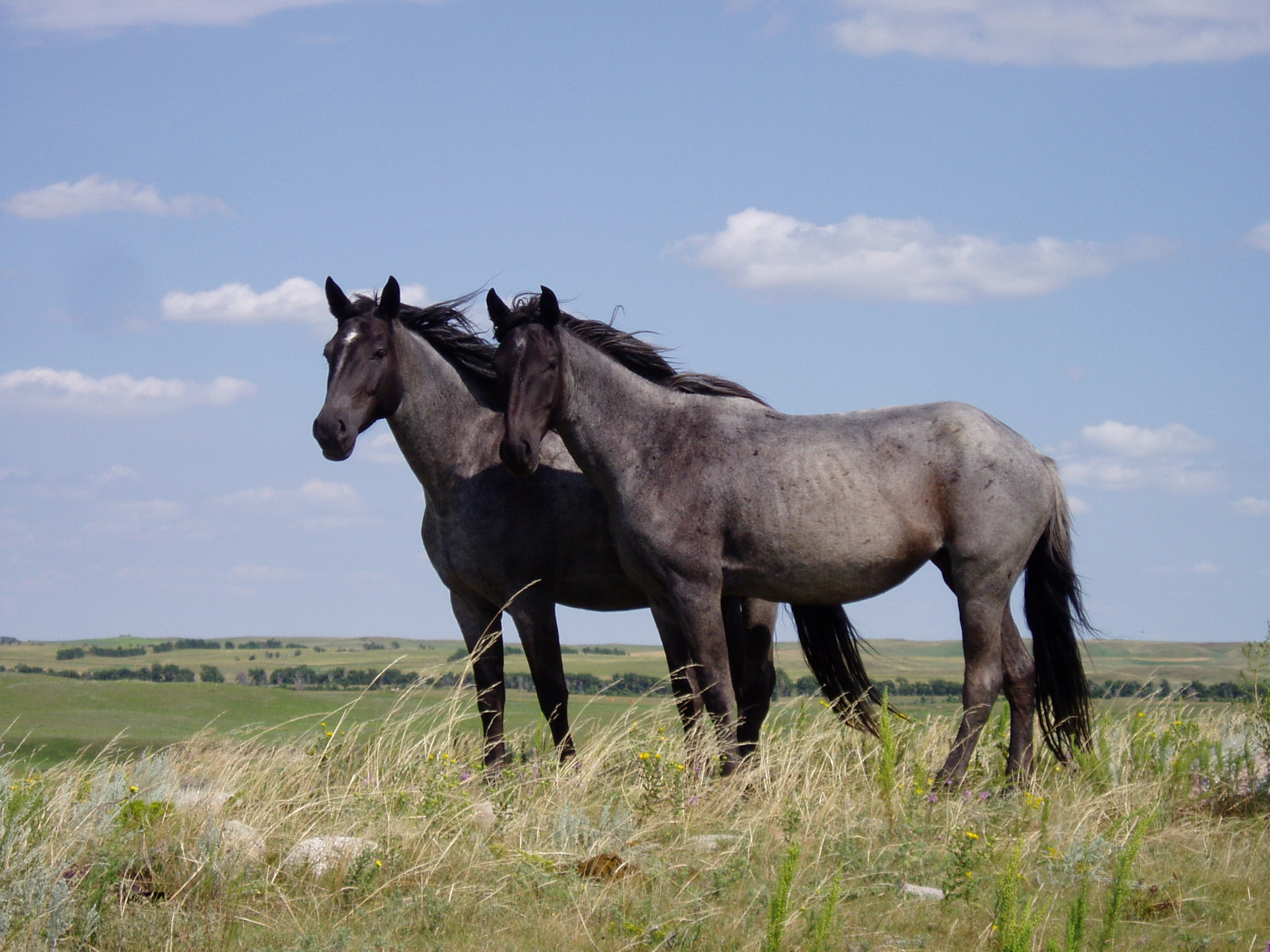
"Blue roan" horses such as these, may be confused with young grays

Some grays in intermediate stages of graying may be confused with a roan or a rabicano. Some heavily fleabitten grays may also be confused with roans. However, roans are easily distinguishable from grays: roan consists of individual white hairs on a dark base coat, usually with the head and legs of the horse darker than the rest of the body. Rabicanos also have intermixed white hairs primarily on the body with a dark head. With gray horses, the head is often the first area to lighten, especially around the eyes and muzzle. Also, roans do not lighten with age, while grays always do.

The varnish roan is another unusual coloration, sometimes seen in Appaloosa horses, that, like gray, can change with age, but unlike gray, the horse does not become progressively lighter until it is pure white. Varnish roans are created by the action of leopard complex within breeds such as the Appaloosa and are seldom seen elsewhere.

=== Diluted colors ===
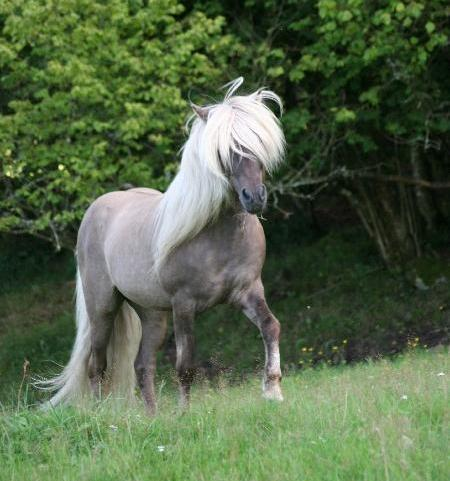
Horse with both Blue dun and silver dapple dilution

The dilution genes that create dun, cream, pearl, silver dapple and champagne coloring may occasionally result in confusion with gray.

Some horses with a particular type of dun hair coat known as a "blue dun", grullo, or "mouse" dun appear to be a solid gray. However, this color is caused by the dun gene acting on a black base coat, and horses who are dun have all hairs the same color; there is no intermingling of white and dark hairs. Also, dun horses do not get lighter as they age. Horses that are a light cream color are also not grays. These are usually cremello, perlino or smoky cream horses, all colors produced by the action of the cream gene. However, if a gray parent passes on the gene, the hairs will turn white like any other gray. Another cream-colored dilution, the pearl gene or "barlink factor", may also create very light-coated horses. Similarly, the champagne gene can lighten coat color, often producing dappling or light colors that can be confused with gray.

In spite of its name, the silver dapple gene has nothing to do with graying. It is a dilution gene that acts only on a black coat, diluting the coat to a dark brown and the mane to a flaxen shade. Horses that express the silver dapple gene (and do not have the gray gene) are born that color and it will not lighten. However, again, if one parent passes on the gray gene, the gray gene will again be dominant.

== Mythology ==
Throughout history, both gray and white horses have been mythologized. As part of its legendary dimension, the gray horse in myth has been depicted with seven heads (Uchaishravas) or eight feet (Sleipnir), sometimes in groups or singly. There are also mythological tales of divinatory gray horses who prophesy or warn of danger.

== See also ==
- Albinism
- Equine coat color
- Equine coat color genetics
