= Puerto Rican Paso Fino =

Horse breed

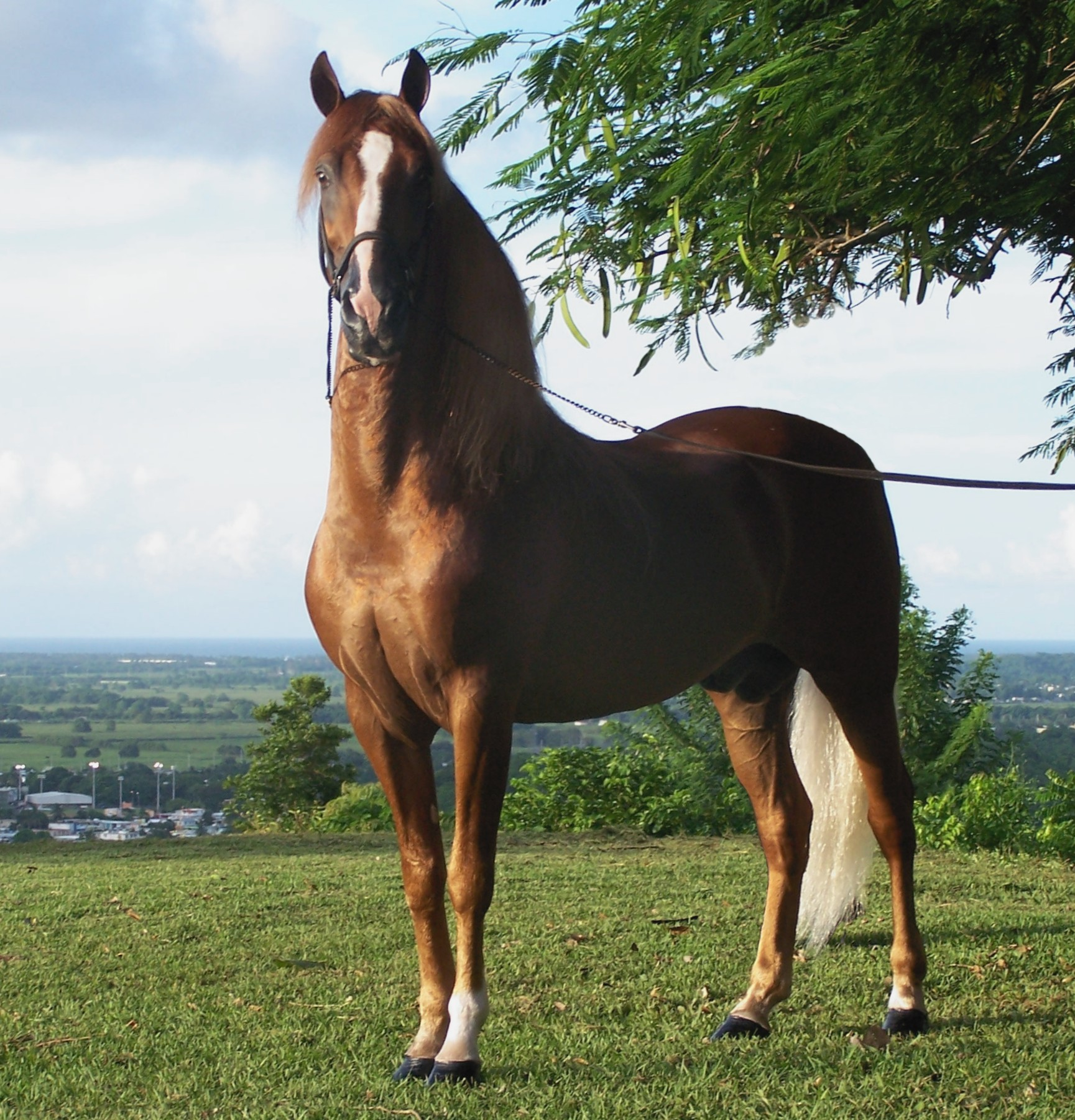
- Réplica de Majestuoso, a Puerto Rican Paso Fino stallion
- Country of origin: Puerto Rico

Traits
- Height: Between 13.2 and 15.2 hands high
- Color: Exclusive tiger eye iris color, various coat patters (chestnut, bay and black most common).
- Distinguishing features: Distinct gait, refined head structure, long flowing hair on mane and tail, compact and muscular build.

The Puerto Rican Paso Fino is a horse breed that was developed on the Caribbean island of Puerto Rico, which is known for its short and smooth gait (a trait shared with unrelated Paso Fino breeds) and aesthetic features which include a flowing mane and tail. The isolating factors of island geography over a 500 year colonial period and the desires of hardy, sure footed, comfortable horses for plantation work led to the artificial selection of this trait from the pre-existing population of Puerto Rican criollo horse.

== History ==
=== Emergence of the trait ===
Genetic studies have found that up to 87.4% of the Puerto Rican Criollo horses possess the allele responsible for the trait, which allowed the breed to emerge independently of other populations and be favored by hacienda owners for plantation transportation as early as the 1500s, being formally identified as a separate breed by 1860.

=== Modern breed ===
In 1927 the most influential sire in the Puerto Rican Paso Fino breed, "Dulce Sueño" was born.

Soon after in the year 1943 the Federation of the Sport of Paso Fino Horses of Puerto Rico and its breed registry was established.

Through careful breeding and the rise of competitions and exhibitions the breed was further refined to improve it's characteristics most important of which is a four beat lateral gait that Puerto Rican Paso Finos execute naturally, without the aid of training devices.

Today, many other breed and competition registries exist for the Puerto Rican Paso Fino both in Puerto Rico as well as in the continental United States. On February 3, 2023, the Legislative Assembly of Puerto Rico declared the purebred Puerto Rican Paso Fino part of the National and Cultural Heritage.
