= Equine melanoma =

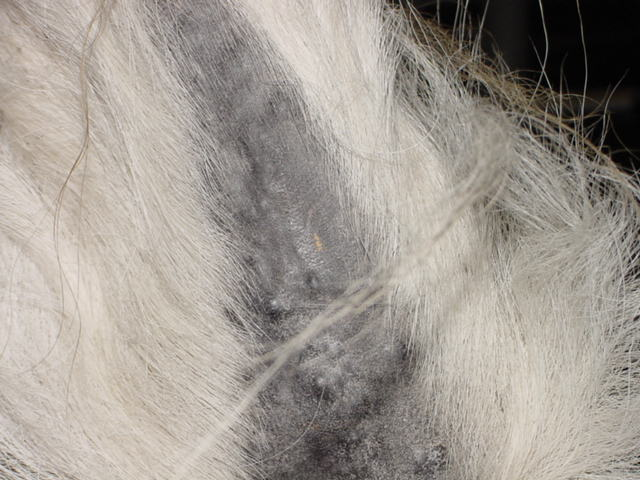
Melanomas found under the dock of the tail

An equine melanoma is a tumor that results from the abnormal growth of melanocytes in horses. Unlike in humans, melanomas in horses are not thought to be caused by exposure to ultraviolet light. Melanomas are the third most common type of skin cancer in horses, with sarcoids being the first most prevalent and squamous-cell carcinoma being second. Melanomas are typically rounded black nodules that vary in size and are usually found underneath the dock of the tail, in the anal, perianal and genital regions, on the perineum, lips, eyelids, and sometimes near the throatlatch.

These tumors can be either benign, meaning not cancerous, or malignant, meaning cancerous; while the benign tumors typically need little treatment to no treatment, the malignant tumors can cause serious problems and can potentially be life-threatening. Different methods are used to determine if the tumor is malignant and whether it has spread to other organs. Methods used to determine malignancy include fine needle aspirate, biopsy, or complete removal. To determine if the tumor has metastasized, a rectal examination or an ultrasound can be performed; the most frequent location for metastasis includes the lymph nodes, spleen, liver, abdominal wall, lungs, and blood vessels. If the tumor becomes large enough, it can cause weight loss or colic. It may also affect the horse's ability to turn their head from side to side and eat and drink comfortably if the tumor is on the throat latch area, or cause faecal impaction if tumor is on the anal region. If melanomas become large and ulcerate, they may become infected.

== Melanoma in gray horses ==
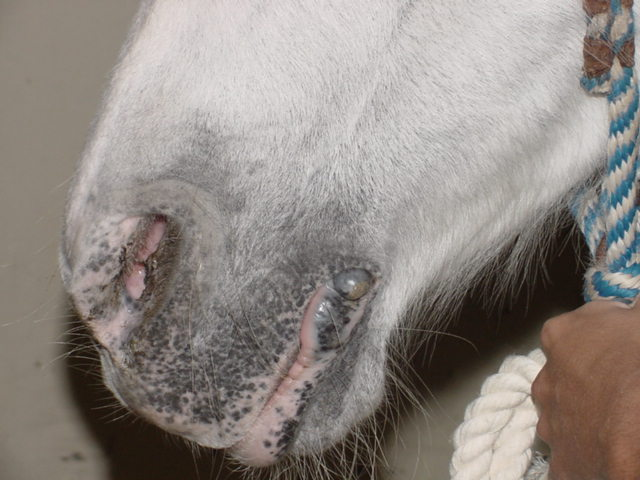
Melanomas found on the lip

Gray horses have a higher susceptibility to melanoma than any other coat color, with up to 80% of gray horses developing some kind of melanoma in their lifetime. Some sources state that up to 66% of those melanomas will become malignant. The gray coat color comes from a gene that is responsible for the gradual depigmentation of the horse's coat; horses with this gene are born darker and over time, they lose their coat pigmentation. The gray gene is the strongest coat color modifier, and will act on any base color. The gray coat color is the result of an autosomal dominant trait that is caused by a 4.6-kb duplication in the 6th intron of the gene syntaxin-17 (STX17). The region of this mutation contains four genes: NR4A3 (nuclear receptor subfamily 4, group A, member 3), STX17, TXNDC4 (thioredoxin domain–containing-4¢) and INVS (inversin). To determine what makes gray horses more susceptible to melanomas, researchers have used different techniques such as the Northern Blot technique and Real-Time PCR. From these studies, it was concluded that the STX17 gene and the NR4A3 gene are both being over-expressed in gray horses, which is responsible for the increased incidences of melanoma in horses with the gray gene.

=== Frequency ===
One study of gray Quarter horses found that 17.7% had melanomas. The average age of the horses was 9.2 years, and melanomas were much more common in older horses than in younger ones. When split by age, prevalence was 52% in horses over 15 years old compared to 10% in horses under. This is lower than in other breeds and the authors postulate it may have been because only a few of the horses were homozygous for gray, that the chestnut allele of extension may be protective against melanomas caused by gray, or that the breed's genetic background may lower the risk.

In Lipizzaners, 50% of gray horses had melanotic tumors. Divided by age, 56% of horses under 16 years and 94% of horses older were affected.

== Types of melanoma ==
Not all melanoma tumors are the same; there are four different types of melanomas that can be found in horses.

=== Melanocytic nevus ===
This type of tumor is found in younger horses, around 5 years of age, and is usually benign. They can develop on horses of any color as small single masses, less than 2.5 cm (0.98 in), anywhere on the body.

=== Dermal melanoma ===
These tumors are usually benign, but can become malignant over time. They vary in size and can be found as singles or multiples. They are most commonly found in mature grey horses (less than 15 years old), typically under the tail, around the anus, and on the external genitalia.

=== Dermal melanoatosis ===
These tumors are frequently malignant and have a high tendency to spread to other organs. They are most commonly found in gray horses over the age of 15 as a large coalescing mass under the tail, around the anus, on the external genitalia, or the parotid salivary gland.

=== Anaplastic melanoma ===
These tumors are malignant and frequently spread to other organs. These are rare tumors, typically found in older (more than 20 years of age) non-gray horses.

== Treatment ==
There are several treatment options when a horse is found to have a melanoma tumor.

=== Surgical removal ===
The surgical removal of a melanoma tumor is performed when the tumors are small; this prevents the tumors from spreading to the surrounding areas.

=== Intralesional cisplatin ===
Cisplatin is a chemotherapy drug that is injected into the tumor itself; this drug is commonly used along with surgical removal. That being said, this drug has been shown to resolve tumors with or without surgical removal for at least 2 years.

=== Cimetidine ===
Cimetidine works by slowing tumor growth; it is a histamine blocker that maintains the body's immune response which aids in the killing of tumor cells. Cimetidine has not been proven to efficiently resolve tumors completely.

=== Melanoma vaccine ===
A vaccine that is similar to the effective canine melanoma vaccine has been created for equine melanoma, and is being studied at the College of Veterinary Medicine at the University of Florida
