= Paso Fino =

Breed of horse

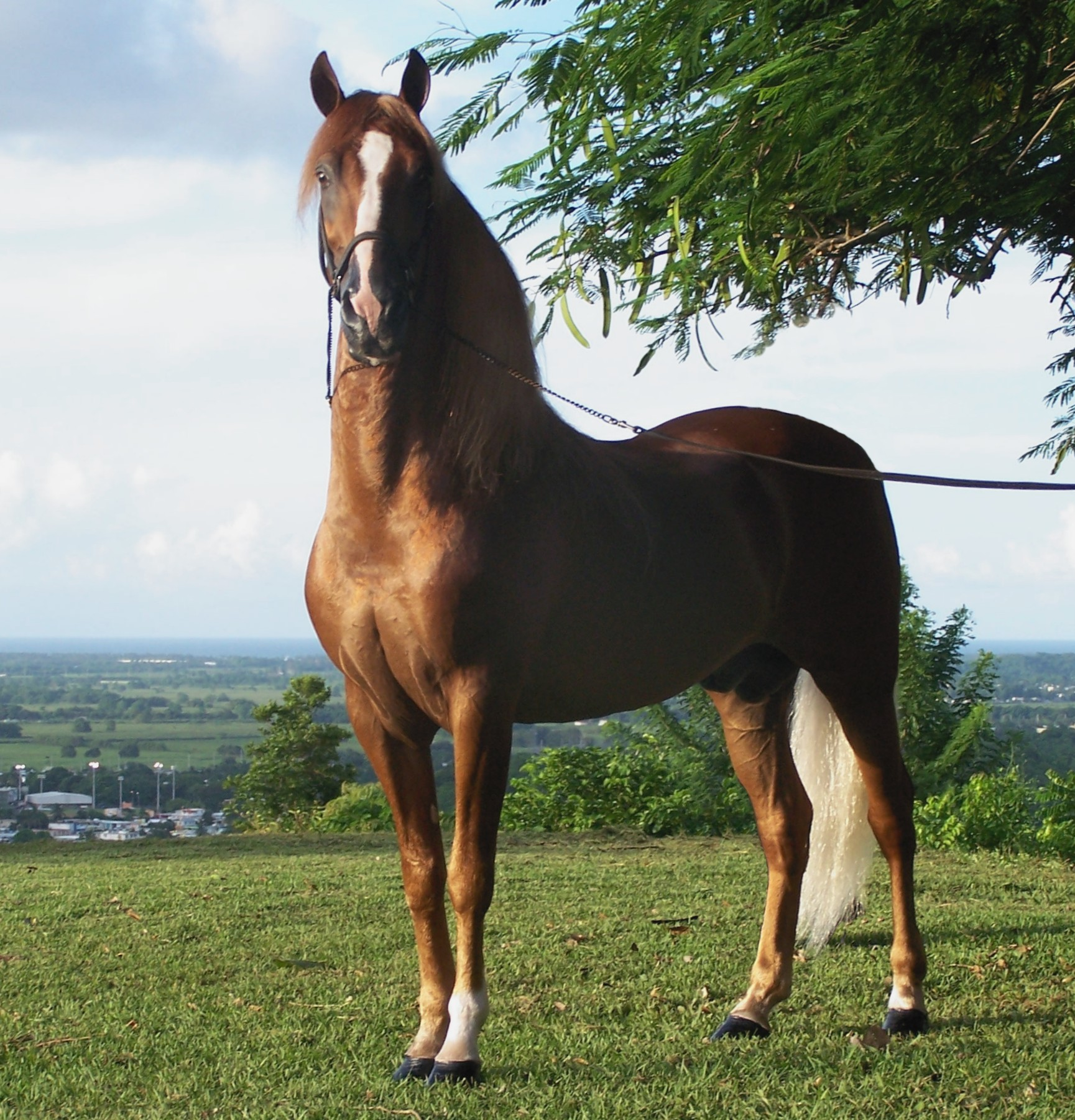
- Paso Fino stallion
- Other names: Pure Puerto Rican Paso Fino; Colombian Paso Fino; Colombian Criollo Horse "Paso Fino Form"; Paso; PF
- Country of origin: Puerto Rico, Colombia, other Latin American nations

Traits
- Distinguishing features: Relatively small with fine build, gaited

Breed standards
- Paso Fino Horse Association (USA); Paso Fino Association Europe; Federación del Deporte de Caballos de Paso Fino de Puerto Rico; Pure Puerto Rican Paso Fino Federation of America; Fedequinas (Colombia); American Trote & Trocha Association

The Paso Fino is a naturally gaited light horse breed dating back to horses imported to the Caribbean from Spain. Pasos are prized for their smooth, natural, four-beat, lateral ambling gait; they are used in many disciplines, but are especially popular for trail riding. In the United States two main groups of horses are popularly called "Paso Fino": One, also known as the Paso Fino Puro Puertorriqueño, originated in Puerto Rico. The other, often called the Colombian Paso Fino or Colombian Criollo Horse, developed in Colombia. Though from similar Spanish ancestors, the two groups developed independently of one another in their home nations.

== History ==
The Paso Fino name means 'fine step'. The Paso Fino is a blend of the Barb, Spanish Jennet, and Andalusian horse and was bred by Spanish land owners in Puerto Rico and Colombia to be used in the plantations because of their endurance and comfortable ride. All Pasos share their heritage with the Peruvian Paso, the American Mustangs, and other descendants of Colonial Spanish Horses. Puerto Rican and Colombian horses, as well as Paso Finos from Cuba and other tropical countries, have been interbred frequently in the United States to produce the modern American Paso Fino show horse.

On the second voyage of Christopher Columbus from Spain to the Americas in 1493, he disembarked with his soldiers, 20 horses and 5 mares on the island of Borinquen at the bay of Aguada (today Añasco), and gave the region the name San Juan Bautista. Soon after, in May 1509, the first governor of the island, Juan Ponce de León, brought horses to Puerto Rico from his hacienda, El Higuey, located on the neighboring island of La Española (now Hispaniola).

=== Puerto Rican Paso Fino ===
The Puerto Rican Paso Fino was developed on the Caribbean island of Puerto Rico over a 500-year colonial period. Island geography and the desires of a people for hardy, sure-footed, comfortable horses led to the independent development of the breed. Frenchman Andres Pedro Ledru, in a notation about horse races held on 17 July 1797, wrote that the speed of these horses was admirable, "they have no trot or gallop, but a type of pace (Andadura). A gait so precipitated that the eye can't follow the movement of the legs." As early as 1849, Paso Fino competitions were held in Puerto Rico, with prizes for winners, for the purpose of improving local horses. In 1882 the first racetrack was built, and in every race meet, there were Paso Fino and Andadura categories.

According to genetic research, Puerto Rican Paso Fino originated from the local Criollo (non-purerbred) horses that were a product of many years of admixture between different Iberian breeds originally brought to the island by the Spanish settlers. These horses carried with them a mutant "gait-keeper" allele that first increased in the Puerto Rican Criollo population as they were bred for centuries for the smooth ride long before the Paso Fino breed was established on the island. In fact, the Criollo horses in Puerto Rico still carry a genomic signature of selection around the "gait-keeper" locus today. Consequently, the Paso Finos, where the mutation is present at 100%, must have originated as a local breed from the population of local non-purebred horses on this island, where they were later selected for other characteristics to improve gait and appearance.

According to Ramirez de Arellano, when the United States invaded Puerto Rico in 1898, the Paso Fino played a first-order role in transportation as well as agricultural work. Manchado, a notable horse of the time owned by Don Nicolás Quiñones Cabezudo of Caguas, was said to be "so fine that it gaited at liberty without its rider in the town square when asked."

In 1927 the most influential sire in the modern Puerto Rican Paso Fino breed, Dulce Sueño, was born in Guayama. In 1943, the Federation of the Sport of Paso Fino Horses of Puerto Rico and a breed registry were established. Copita Don Q, a Dulce Sueño grandson, was the winner of the first annual Federation contest in 1943. In an agricultural almanac published in 1947, Gustavo A Ramirez de Arellano wrote, "at present the descendants of the famous stallion 'Dulce Sueño' are the ones who have most obtained titles and trophies from the association of owners of saddle horses."

=== Importation and development in the United States ===
The rise of the Paso Fino in the United States began in the 1950s and 1960s. The first Paso Finos in the United States were imported by members of the armed services, who purchased the horses while stationed in Puerto Rico. This stock provided some of the first Paso Finos bred in the United States.

Colombian Pasos came to the United States beginning with a rancher who visited Colombia and purchased quite a number of the horses to work his cattle. He introduced the second strain into the US. While the two strains are still bred individually to retain their purity, they are also crossbred to produce the best of both strains.

Today, the Paso Fino Horse Association (PFHA) oversees and regulates registered Paso Finos in the US. It was founded in 1972 under the name "American Paso Finos", later changing to its current name. It registers and promotes both Puerto Rican and Colombian horses, and under the PFHA, the two groups have been frequently crossbred. As the numbers of Colombian horses have begun to significantly outnumber those of Puerto Rican bloodlines, a trend has developed favoring preservation breeding to preserve the bloodlines of each group.

== Characteristics ==
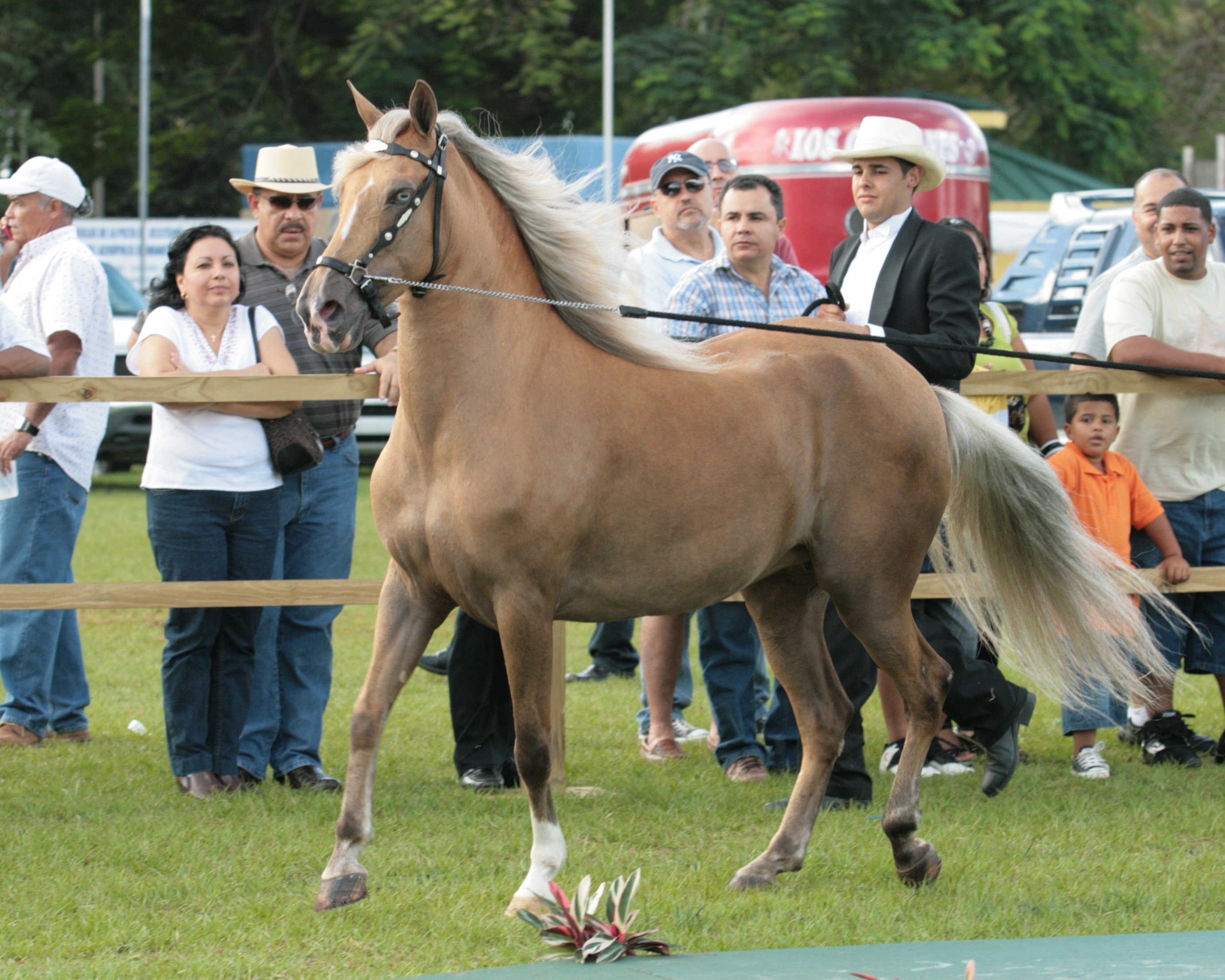
This mare has tiger eye, an eye color so far only found in Puerto Rican Paso Finos.

The Paso Fino tends to be refined, standing an average of 13 to 15.2 hands (52 to 62 inches, 132 to 157 cm) but is powerful for its size. It has a convex head, clean legs and a relatively short back with prominent withers. Cannon bones tend to be short and the hooves are hard. The Paso Fino often has a thick mane and tail. It is found in all horse colors and there are no restrictions by the various breed associations. The Puerto Rican Paso Fino is the only breed in which tiger eye was found, which usually lightens the eyes to a striking amber, yellow, or bright orange color.

The action of the two strains is somewhat different. The Puerto Rican Paso Fino is prized for its fine or delicate step, while the Colombian Paso Fino tends to have more of a rapid, piston-like action.

This is a lively horse that has a natural drive and willingness, known colloquially as "brio", and generally an amiable disposition. Paso Finos come in a variety of colors, sizes and body types, but the even four-beat gait and brio are present in all good representatives of the breed.

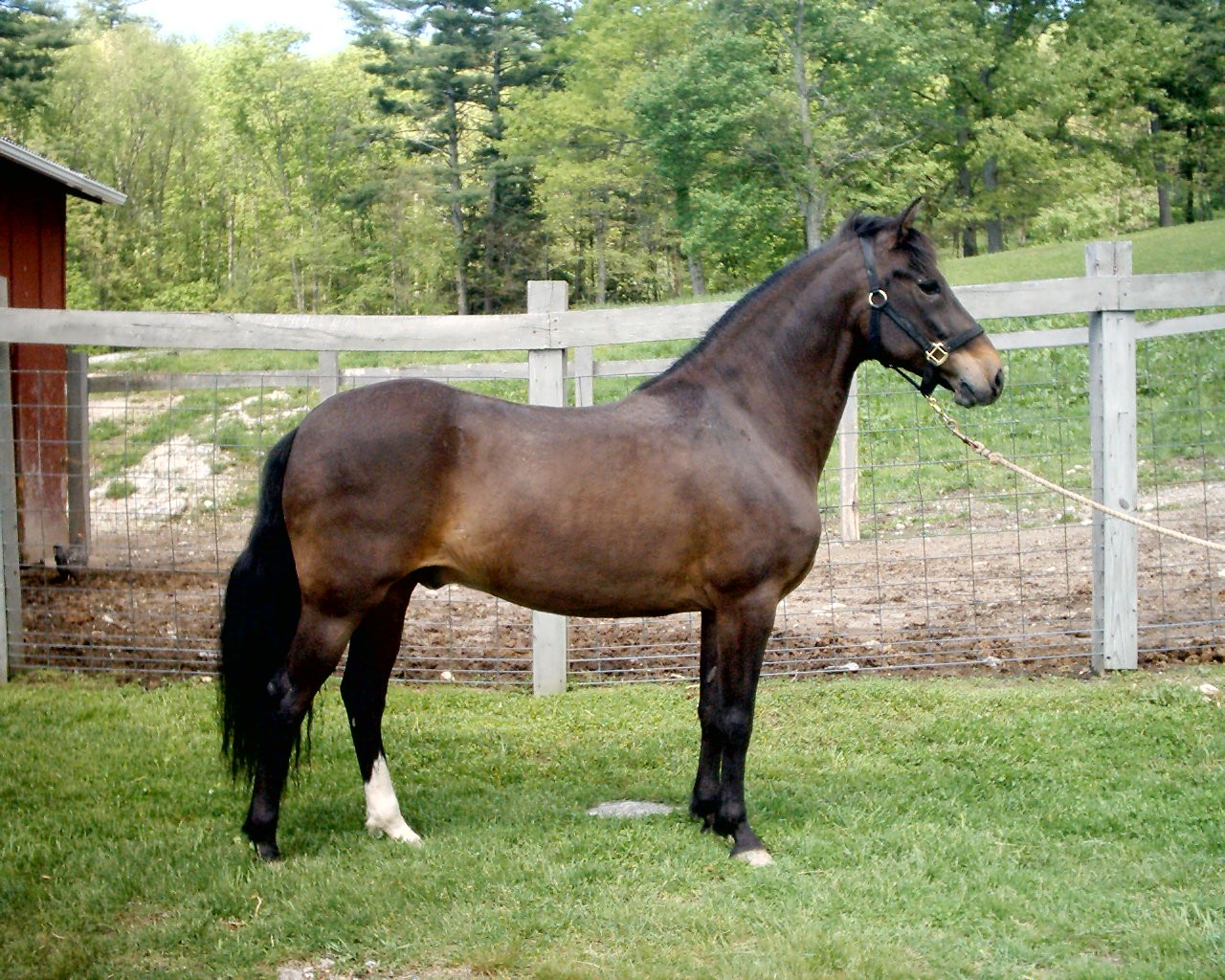
A Paso Fino gelding of predominantly Colombian breeding

=== Gaits ===
The Paso Fino executes a natural evenly spaced four-beat lateral ambling gait, similar to many gaited horses. Both the Colombian and the Puerto Rican strains of the Paso Fino execute the lateral gait naturally, without the aid of training devices.

The Paso Fino's gaits are performed at varied levels of extension in stride. All four hooves travel close to the ground while in motion and are lifted equally in height as the horse covers ground. At whatever speed the horse travels, the smoothness of the gait ideally allows the rider to appear motionless with little up and down movement.

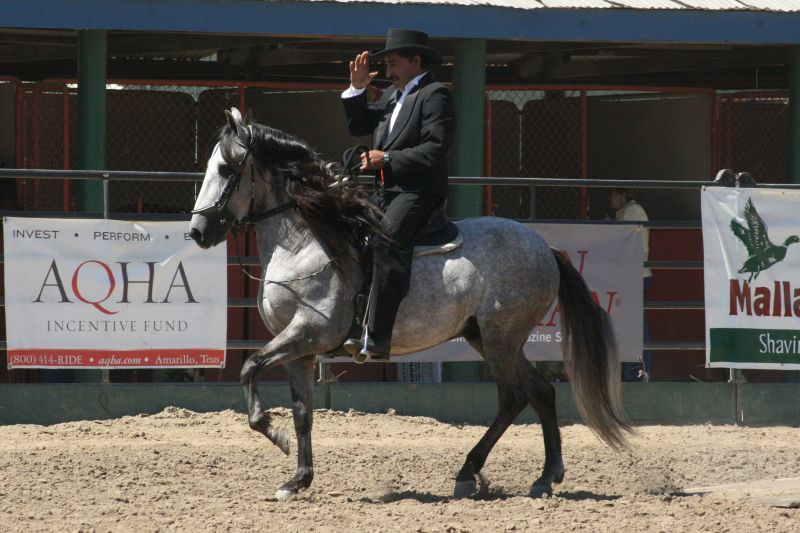
Paso Fino performing Classic Fino

- The classic fino or paso fino is a collected gait with rapid footfalls that covers as little ground as possible. It requires a high degree of collection. This is a show gait reserved for competition. Walking, trotting, cantering or any detected break from the rapid evenly spaced sequence of steps is grounds for disqualification at any time during a fino event.
- The paso corto is slightly more extended, and used during trail rides. The speed of this gait is comparable to the speed of a trot but is much smoother.
- The paso largo is a fast, lateral, four-beat gait in which the horse can reach speeds equivalent to a canter or slow gallop. The paso largo is not just an increase in speed but also shows a distinct extension in stride. The paso largo can be extremely fast, up to 25-30 mph.

Only a few Paso Finos can perform a true classic fino, but the majority perform the other gaits with ease. The correctness of the gait is very important by today's standards, therefore horses with a very even four-beat gait are much preferred for professional breeding.

In Colombia, some related native horses perform a slightly different, unevenly timed diagonal four-beat gait, known as the trocha, which is similar to the fox trot, and very smooth. While some Paso Finos will perform the trocha, it is discouraged and considered a fault in the purebred Paso Fino. In Colombia the "trocha" has evolved, becoming a separate genealogical line. It is inherited in a manner similar to the lateral ambling gaits of the purebred Paso Fino. Trocha rivals in popularity with paso fino in Colombia, but crossbreeding is now avoided. Another Colombian breed performs what is known as trote y galope. The trote y galope horses perform an exaggerated diagonal two-beat trot and a very collected canter, but they do share some common heritage with the Paso Fino. Not as well known as Paso Fino, these variants are just beginning to be recognized in the United States.

== Uses ==
Paso Finos are versatile and are used in many disciplines. They have horse shows for the breed only, but are also seen competing in all-breed disciplines such as trail riding and endurance competition, driving and gymkhana.
