= Tiger eye =

Color of horses' eyes

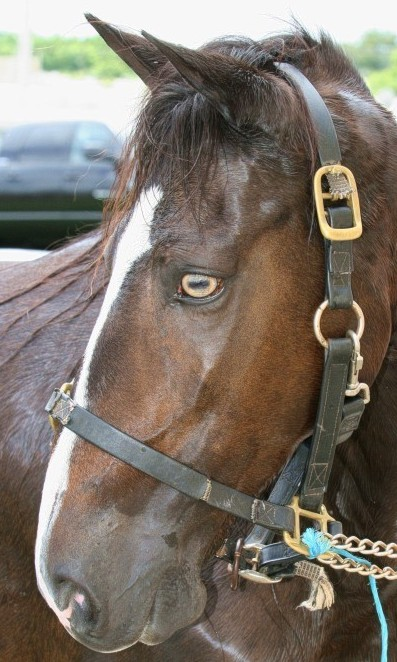
A horse showing the characteristic tiger eye.

Tiger eye or goat eye is a gene causing diluted eye color in horses. There are two variants, Tiger-eye 1 (TE1) and Tiger-eye 2 (TE2), which are both recessive. Horses displaying tiger eye typically have a yellow, orange, or amber iris. Tiger eye has only been found in Puerto Rican Paso Fino horses. Horses of related breeds were tested (90 Colombian Pasos, 20 Mangalargas, 44 Lusitanos, and 42 Andalusian horses), and none were found to have either tiger eye allele. No obvious link between eye shade and coat color was seen, making this the first studied gene in horses to affect eye color but not coat color. Tiger eye does not appear to affect vision, and there were no signs of reduced pigment on the retina or retinal pigment epithelium.

== Genotypes ==
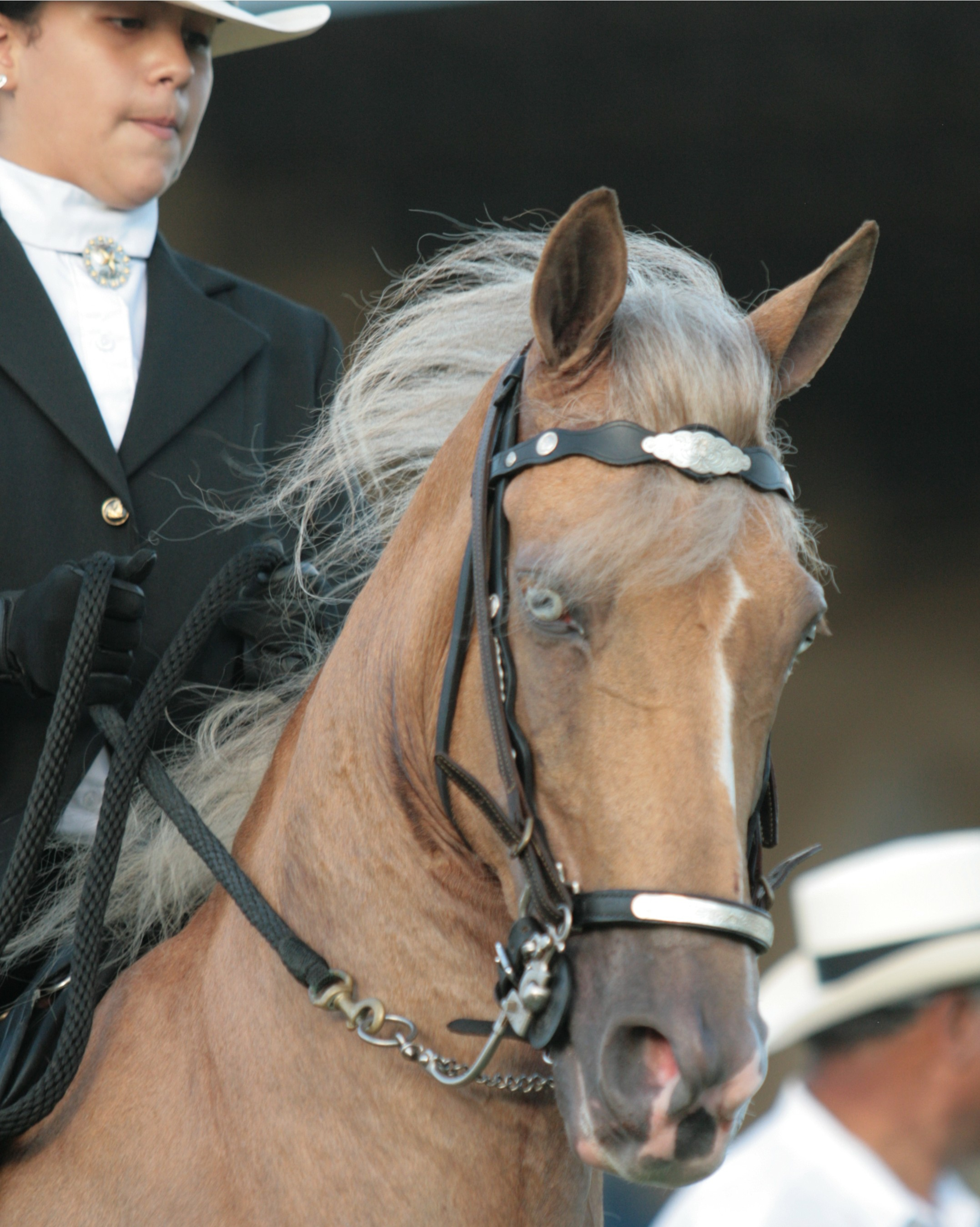
This palomino is homozygous for Tiger-eye 2, and has blue eyes.

- TE1/TE1 or TE1/TE2: Yellow, amber, or bright orange eyes.
- TE2/TE2: Blue eyes when in combination with cream. It is not known what this looks like without cream. Only one horse has been tested to carry this genotype.
- TE1/n, TE2/n, or n/n: Dark eyes.

== Molecular genetics ==
The gene involved codes for SLC24A5, a solute carrier known to be involved in pigmentation in other species. SLC24A5 is found on equine chromosome 1 base pairs 141,657,837–141,678,329 and the protein is a potassium-dependent sodium–calcium ion exchanger involved in melanocyte maturation. The protein is believed to be located in the trans-golgi network of melanocytes. Tiger-eye 1 is a missense mutation (c.272A>T and p.Phe91Tyr) in which a single adenine is replaced with a thymine in exon 2, changing a phenylalanine to a tyrosine in the resulting protein. Tiger-eye 2 is a deletion (c.875-340_1081+82del) in which the entirety of exon 7, and a bit of the introns on either side, are removed, resulting in a protein that is 69 amino acids shorter. Both mutations are predicted to be deleterious to protein function.

Another mutation at this same gene is associated with the shade of black horses. One variant is mainly found in jet black horses, while the other variant is mainly found in fading black horses. However, the association is not perfect and there are probably other mutations that can also cause the fading black appearance.

== In other species ==
SLC24A5 is involved in pigmentation in humans, mice, and zebrafish. In mice a targeted mutation was found which diluted the eye color without visibly affecting coat color, though a closer examination found that the melanosomes were smaller and paler than the wild type. Unlike tiger eye in horses, the mice showed reduced pigment in the retinal pigment epithelium. In humans a widespread mutation to the homologous gene plays a large role in the light skin color of European humans, and another mutation can cause oculocutaneous albinism (OCA) type 6 (OCA6), which impairs vision. No vision impairment is seen in horses, and the coat color is not visibly affected.
