= Colorado Ranger =

American horse breed

Colorado Ranger Horse
- Other names: Colorado Rangerbred
- Country of origin: United States

Traits
- Distinguishing features: Endurance, 'cow sense' and athletic ability, some horses have spotted coats

Breed standards
- Colorado Ranger Horse Association

The Colorado Ranger is a horse breed from the Colorado High Plains in the United States. The breed is descended from two stallions imported from Turkey to the US state of Virginia in the late 1800s. These stallions were then bred to ranch horses in Nebraska and Colorado, and in the early 1900s the two stallions who every registered Colorado Ranger traces to, Patches #1 and Max #2, were foaled. The breed was championed by rancher Mike Ruby, who founded the Colorado Ranger Horse Association in 1935. Original registry membership limits resulted in many Colorado Ranger horses being registered instead as Appaloosas, but pedigree research is ongoing to discover additional horses who trace their ancestry back to the original stallions.

By 2005, more than 6,000 Colorado Ranger horses had been registered. Colorado Rangers may be any solid color or carry leopard spotting patterns. Pinto coloration and American Paint Horse breeding are not allowed, nor are draft horse and pony breeding. Colorado Ranger horses may be dual registered with the Appaloosa Horse Club, and approximately 90 percent are.

== Characteristics and registration ==
Colorado Ranger horses may be of any color except pinto and American Paint Horse breeding is not allowed within five generations of any registered horse's pedigree. They stand 14.2 to 16 hands (58 to 64 inches, 147 to 163 cm) high. The breed has a straight facial profile, long, muscular neck and deep chest. The shoulders and croup are sloping, connected by a short back. Colorado Ranger horses are still used for their original purpose as ranch horses. They are also shown, both in Western and English disciplines, although mainly the former, and used for trail and pleasure riding. They are known for their athleticism, good disposition and abilities as stock horses.

All registered Colorado Ranger Horses trace directly to one of two foundation sires in their pedigree. The first is Patches #1 and the second is Max #2, a son of another horse named Max born in 1918. Registered Colorado Rangerbreds may be bred to registered Thoroughbreds, American Quarter Horses, Appaloosas, Arabians and AraAppaloosas, and the resulting progeny registered as purebred Colorado Rangerbreds. Horses with draft horse or pony blood may not be registered. Colorado Ranger Horses may be double-registered with the Appaloosa Horse Club, but Appaloosas may not be registered with the CRHA unless they have the proper bloodlines. Approximately 90 percent of Colorado Ranger horses are dual-registered.

== History ==
The original foundation ancestors of the Colorado Ranger were two stallions brought to the United States and given to US president Ulysses S. Grant by the Turkish Sultan Abdul Hamid II in 1878. The first horse was a gray Barb named Linden Tree, foaled in 1874. The second was a desert-bred Arabian, also gray, named Leopard, foaled in 1873. The two stallions reached Virginia in 1879, after their voyage from Turkey. Upon reaching Virginia, they spent 14 years in the breeding herds of Randolph Huntington, a noted breeder of trotting and roadster horses. In 1896, Randolph leased Leopard and Linden Tree to a friend of Grant's, named General Colby, who used the stallions to breed a number of mares on his ranch in Nebraska. These breedings were successful at producing high-quality ranch horses, and a few years later several ranches in Colorado collaborated to buy a group of horses, including one stallion, from the Colby Ranch. All of the mares were sired by one of the two imported sires, and the stallion, a few-spot leopard Appaloosa, was a grandson of Leopard on both sides of his pedigree. The influence of Linden Tree and Leopard on American horse breeding was such that they are now listed in the studbooks for the Arabian Horse Association and the Jockey Club (which registers Thoroughbreds), both major breed associations in the United States.

=== 20th century ===
The Colorado ranchers used the horses purchased from Colby to improve their existing ranch stock, and the progeny of these crossings became the Colorado Ranger Horse. Although leopard coloration was not originally an aim of the breeding program, many of the resulting horses bore spotted coat patterns, and breeders began to include the patterning as one of their goals. Two other stallions also became influential foundation sires of the breed. One was a Colorado-born leopard-spot colt named Max, foaled in 1918. The second was a Barb stallion named Spotte, imported from North Africa in 1918 by the owner of the W.R. Thompson Cattle Company as a wedding gift for his daughter. This stallion provided another important infusion of Barb blood, which had been diluted in the breed since Linden Tree had been imported from Turkey.

Mike Ruby, a horseman from the Colorado High Plains, became interested in the breed and acquired Max and Patches, a son of the original Colby Ranch stallion. During his time breeding Colorado Ranger horses, he kept complete records of every horse that he bred, which became the initial pedigree record for the breed association. Ruby was invited to bring two stallions to the Denver Stock Show in 1934, and chose to take Leopard #3 and Fox #10. The names Colorado Rangers and Colorado Rangerbreds were coined during this show by members of the now-Colorado State University faculty, in reference to the horses having been bred on the ranges of Colorado. Although "Colorado Ranger" is the official name of the breed, the nickname of "Rangerbreds" is still commonly used.

Ruby was influential in saving some of the highest-quality Ranger stock during the severe drought of the 1930s, by driving them over 300 miles (480 km) to better pasture in a history-making journey. When the rains returned to eastern Colorado, he again made the drive to return the horses to their original pasture. After re-establishing his herd, Ruby developed a practice of leasing groups of his Rangerbred horses to other ranchers throughout the western United States for use as breeding stock. Through this practice, Colorado Ranger horses influenced, and were in return influenced by, the Quarter Horse, Appaloosa and other western stock horse breeds.

In 1935, Ruby founded the Colorado Ranger Horse Association (CRHA), and was granted a corporate charter for the association in 1938. Ruby remained president of the organization from 1935 until his death in 1942. The registry initially imposed a 50-member limit, and many Ranger horses, whose breeders were not allowed to become members, were instead registered with the Appaloosa Horse Club. The member limit was lifted in 1964, and since then pedigree research has continued to find and register horses with Ranger breeding that are un-registered or registered as Appaloosas. During the 1980s, some Lusitano blood was allowed into the breed, but this practice has been discontinued. The CRHA states that up to 1 in 8 registered Appaloosas may have Colorado Ranger blood, and as such be eligible for registry with the CRHA. As of 2005, there were more than 6,000 horses registered with the CRHA, with between 100 and 125 new horses registered annually. While originally bred in the western US, today many Colorado Rangers are found in the midwest and eastern parts of the country, including the states of Michigan, Ohio and Pennsylvania. They are also found in Canada, where there is at least one large breeding farm.
