= Jennet (disambiguation) =

Jennet may be a girl's name, similar to Janet, or may refer to:

- The jennet, a historic type of riding horse
- The Spanish Jennet Horse, a developing new horse breed in the United States
- A female donkey, also written "jenny" (the pronunciation is identical in some dialects of English)
- A female hinny, also written "jenny"
