= Appaloosa =

American horse breed noted for spotted color pattern

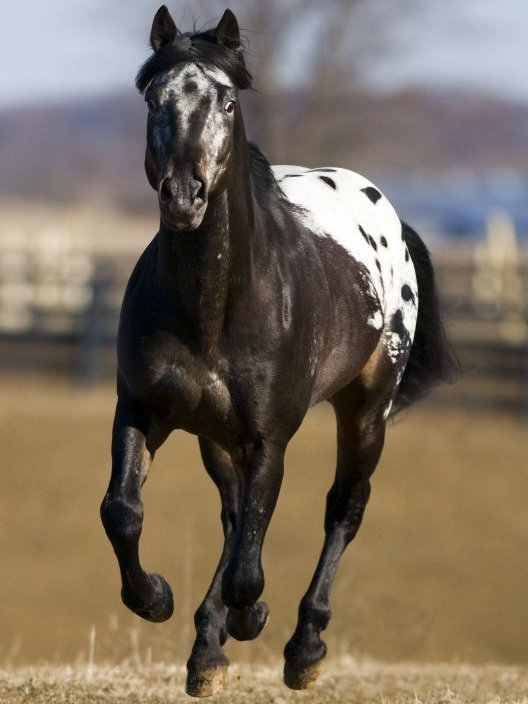
- Appaloosa horse
- Country of origin: United States

Traits
- Distinguishing features: Most representatives have colorful spotted coat patterns, striped hooves, mottled skin, and white sclera visible around the iris when the eye is in a normal position.

Breed standards
- Appaloosa Horse Club

The Appaloosa is an American horse breed best known for its colorful spotted coat pattern. There is a wide range of body types within the breed, stemming from the influence of multiple breeds of horses throughout its history. Each horse's color pattern is genetically the result of various spotting patterns overlaid on top of one of several recognized base coat colors. The color pattern of the Appaloosa is of interest to those who study equine coat color genetics, as it and several other physical characteristics are linked to the leopard complex mutation (LP). Appaloosas are prone to develop equine recurrent uveitis and congenital stationary night blindness; the latter has been linked to the leopard complex.

Artwork depicting prehistoric horses with leopard spotting exists in prehistoric cave paintings in Europe. Images of domesticated horses with leopard spotting patterns appeared in artwork from Ancient Greece and The Han dynasty China through the early modern period. In North America, The Nez Perce people of what today is the United States Pacific Northwest developed the original American spotted breed. Settlers once referred to these spotted horses as the "Palouse horse", possibly after the Palouse River which ran through the heart of Nez Percé country. Gradually, the name evolved into Appaloosa.

The Nez Perce lost most of their horses after the Nez Perce War in 1877, and the breed fell into decline for several decades. A small number of dedicated breeders preserved the Appaloosa as a distinct breed until the Appaloosa Horse Club (ApHC) was formed as the breed registry in 1938. The modern breed maintains bloodlines tracing to the foundation bloodstock of the registry; its partially open stud book allows the addition of some Thoroughbred, American Quarter Horse and Arabian blood.

Today, the Appaloosa is one of the most popular breeds in the United States; it was named the state horse of Idaho in 1975. It is best known as a stock horse used in a number of western riding disciplines, but is also a versatile breed with representatives seen in many other types of equestrian activity. Appaloosas have been used in many movies; an Appaloosa is a mascot for the Florida State Seminoles. Appaloosa bloodlines have influenced other horse breeds, including the Pony of the Americas, the Nez Perce Horse, and several gaited horse breeds.

== Breed characteristics ==
The Appaloosa is best known for its distinctive, leopard complex-spotted coat, which is preferred in the breed. Spotting occurs in several overlay patterns on one of several recognized base coat colors. There are three other distinctive, "core" characteristics: mottled skin, striped hooves, and eyes with a white sclera.

Skin mottling is usually seen around the muzzle, eyes, anus, and genitalia. Striped hooves are a common trait, quite noticeable on Appaloosas, but not unique to the breed. The sclera is the part of the eye surrounding the iris; although all horses show white around the eye if the eye is rolled back, to have a readily visible white sclera with the eye in a normal position is a distinctive characteristic seen more often in Appaloosas than in other breeds. Because the occasional individual is born with little or no visible spotting pattern, the ApHC allows "regular" registration of horses with mottled skin plus at least one of the other core characteristics. Horses with two ApHC parents but no "identifiable Appaloosa characteristics" are registered as "non-characteristic," a limited special registration status.

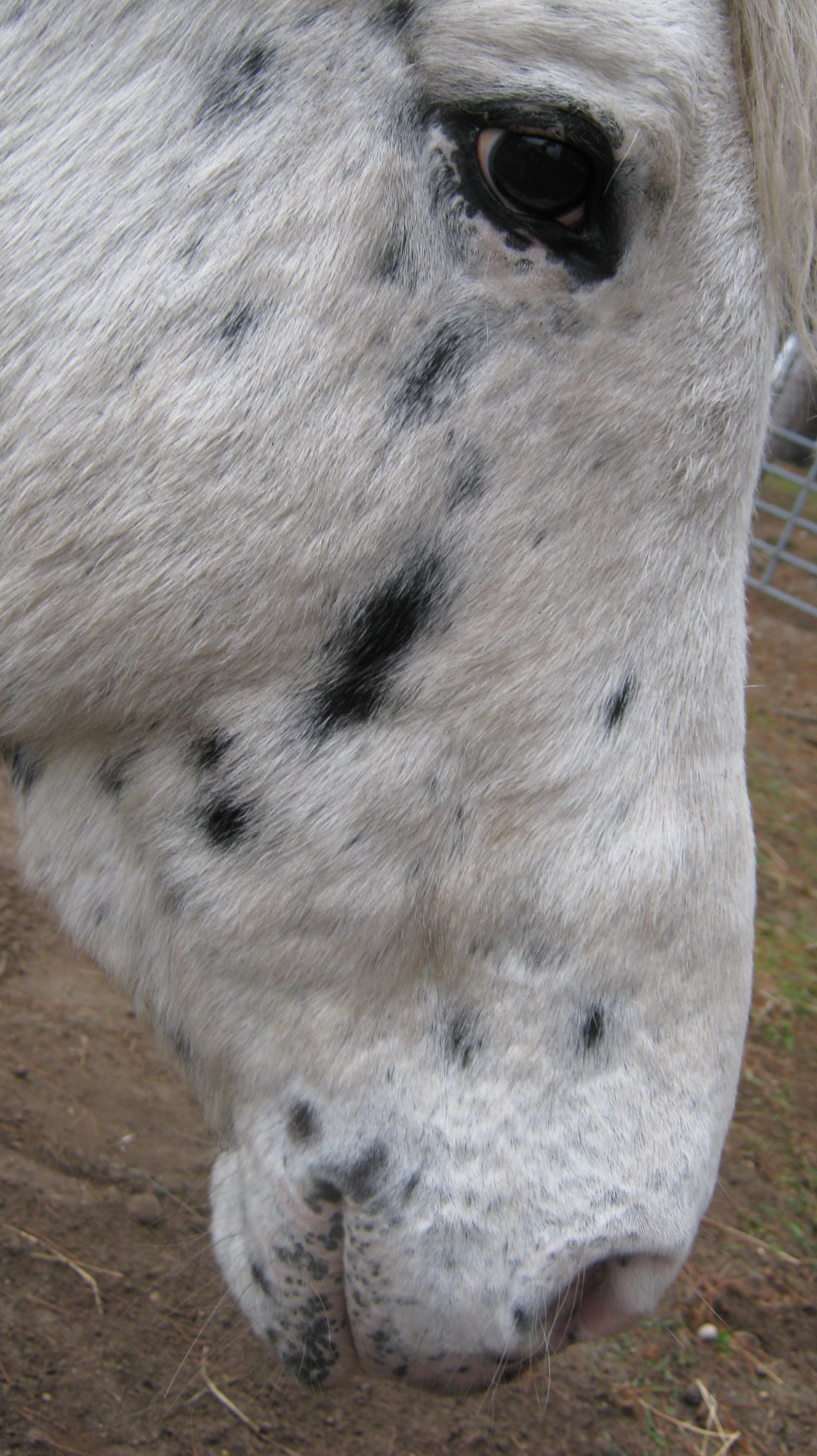
Mottling on the skin is particularly visible around the eyes and muzzle. The sclera of an Appaloosa's eye is white.

There is a wide range of body types in the Appaloosa, in part because the leopard complex characteristics are its primary identifying factors, and also because several different horse breeds influenced its development. The weight range varies from 950 to 1,250 pounds (430 to 570 kg), and heights from 14 to 16 hands (56 to 64 inches, 142 to 163 cm). However, the ApHC does not allow pony or draft breeding.

The original "old time" or "old type" Appaloosa was a tall, narrow-bodied, rangy horse. The body style reflected a mix that started with the traditional Spanish horses already common on the plains of America before 1700. Then, 18th-century European bloodlines were added, particularly those of the "pied" horses popular in that period and shipped en masse to the Americas once the color had become unfashionable in Europe. These horses were similar to a tall, slim Thoroughbred-Andalusian type of horse popular in Bourbon-era Spain. The original Appaloosa tended to have a convex facial profile that resembled that of the warmblood-Jennet crosses first developed in the 16th century during the reign of Charles V.

The old-type Appaloosa was later modified by the addition of draft horse blood after the 1877 defeat of the Nez Perce, when U.S. Government policy forced the Native Americans to become farmers and provided them with draft horse mares to breed to existing stallions. The original Appaloosas frequently had a sparse mane and tail, but that was not a primary characteristic, as many early Appaloosas did have full manes and tails. There is a possible genetic link between the leopard complex and sparse mane and tail growth, although the precise relationship is unknown.

After the formation of the Appaloosa Horse Club in 1938, a more modern type of horse was developed after the addition of American Quarter Horse and Arabian bloodlines. The addition of Quarter Horse lines produced Appaloosas that performed better in sprint racing and in halter competition. Many cutting and reining horses resulted from old-type Appaloosas crossed on Arabian bloodlines, particularly via the Appaloosa foundation stallion Red Eagle. An infusion of Thoroughbred blood was added during the 1970s to produce horses more suited for racing. Many current breeders also attempt to breed away from the sparse, "rat tail" trait, and therefore modern Appaloosas have fuller manes and tails.

== Color and spotting patterns ==
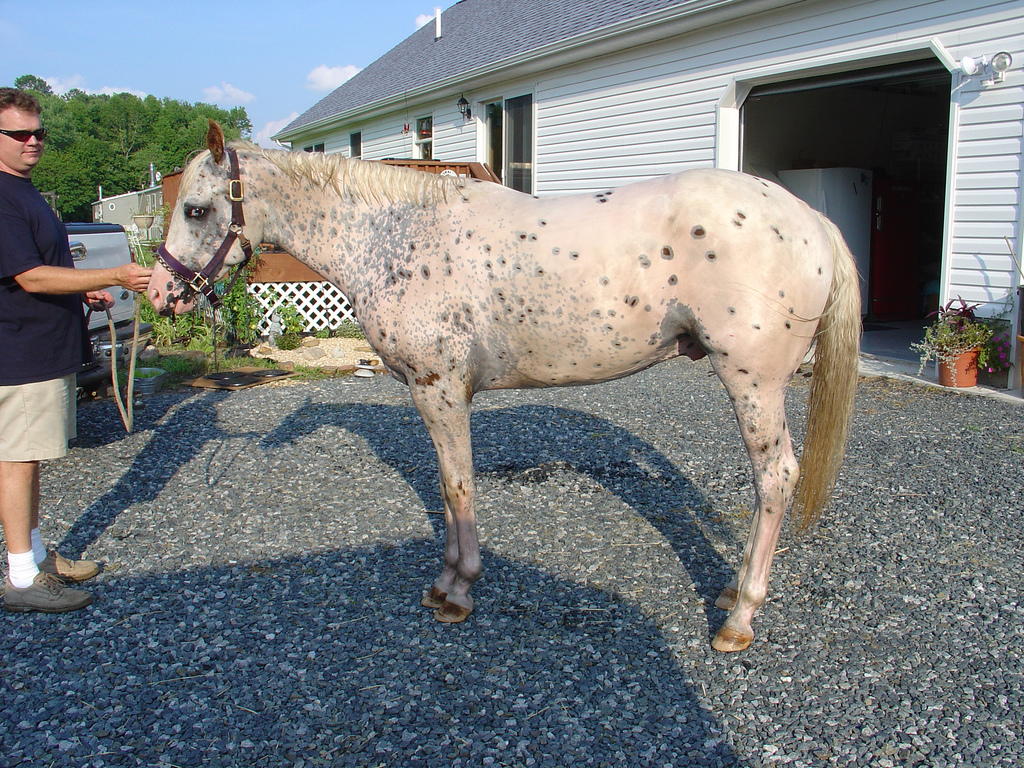
Few spot leopard Appaloosa with wet coat, showing a "halo" effect of dark skin under the white coat, especially around spots

The coat color of an Appaloosa is a combination of a base color with an overlaid spotting pattern. The base colors recognized by the Appaloosa Horse Club include bay, black, chestnut, palomino, buckskin, cremello or perlino, roan, gray, dun and grulla. Appaloosa markings have several pattern variations. It is this unique group of spotting patterns, collectively called the "leopard complex", that most people associate with the Appaloosa horse. Spots overlay darker skin, and are often surrounded by a "halo", where the skin next to the spot is also dark but the overlying hair coat is white.

It is not always easy to predict a grown Appaloosa's color at birth. Foals of any breed tend to be born with coats that darken when they shed their baby hair. In addition, Appaloosa foals do not always show classic leopard complex characteristics. Patterns sometimes change over the course of the horse's life although some, such as the blanket and leopard patterns, tend to be stable. Horses with the varnish roan and snowflake patterns are especially prone to show very little color pattern at birth, developing more visible spotting as they get older.

The ApHC also recognizes the concept of a "solid" horse, which has a base color, "but no contrasting color in the form of an Appaloosa coat pattern". Solid horses can be registered if they have mottled skin, and one other leopard complex characteristic.

Solid Appaloosa horses are not to be confused with gray horses, which display a similar mottling called "fleabitten gray". As they age, "fleabitten" grays may develop pigmented speckles in addition to a white coat. However, "fleabitten gray" is a different gene, and is unrelated to the leopard complex gene seen in the Appaloosa breed. While the Appaloosa Horse Club (ApHC) allows gray Appaloosa horses to be registered, gray is rare in the breed. Similarly, "dapple" gray horses are also different from Appaloosa horses, in terms of both coat color genes and patterning.

Base colors are overlain by various spotting patterns, which are variable and often do not fit neatly into a specific category. These patterns are described as follows:

Pattern	Description	Image (Note: Based on images from Sponenberg, Equine Color Genetics, pp. 153–156.)
Spots	A horse that has white or dark spots over all or a portion of its body.	
Blanket or snowcap	A solid white area normally over, but not limited to, the hip area with a contrasting base color.	
Blanket with spots	A white blanket which has dark spots within the white. The spots are usually the same color as the horse's base color.	
Leopard	A white horse with dark spots that flow out over the entire body. Considered an extension of a blanket to cover the whole body.	
Few spot leopard	A mostly white horse with a bit of color remaining around the flank, neck and head.	
Snowflake	A horse with white spots, flecks, on a dark body. Typically the white spots increase in number and size as the horse ages.	
Appaloosa roan, marble or varnish roan	A distinct version of the leopard complex. Intermixed dark and light hairs with lighter colored area on the forehead, jowls and frontal bones of the face, over the back, loin and hips. Darker areas may appear along the edges of the frontal bones of the face as well and also on the legs, stifle, above the eye, point of the hip and behind the elbow. The dark points over bony areas are called "varnish marks" and distinguish this pattern from a traditional roan.	
Mottled	A fewspot leopard that is completely white with only mottled skin showing.	
Roan blanket or Frost	Horses with roaning over the croup and hips. The blanket normally occurs over, but is not limited to, the hip area.	
Roan blanket with spots	A horse with a roan blanket that has white and/or dark spots within the roan area.	

=== Color genetics ===
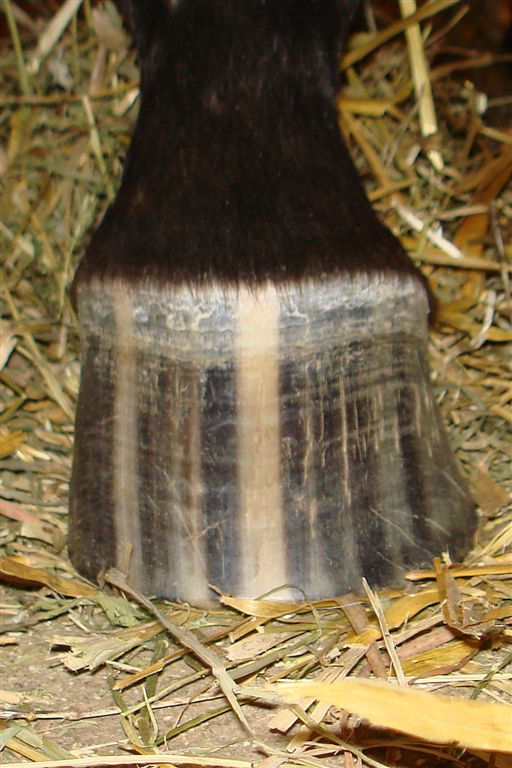
Striped hooves are a characteristic trait.

Any horse that shows Appaloosa core characteristics of coat pattern, mottled skin, striped hooves, and a visible white sclera, carries at least one allele of the dominant "leopard complex" (LP) gene. The use of the word "complex" is used to refer to the large group of visible patterns that may occur when LP is present. LP is an autosomal incomplete dominant mutation in the TRPM1 gene located at horse chromosome 1 (ECA 1). All horses with at least one copy of LP show leopard characteristics, and it is hypothesized that LP acts together with other patterning genes (PATN) that have not yet been identified to produce the different coat patterns. Horses that are heterozygous for LP tend to be darker than homozygous horses, but this is not consistent.

Three single-nucleotide polymorphisms (SNPs) in the TRPM1 gene have been identified as closely associated with the LP mutation, although the mechanism by which the pattern is produced remains unclear. A commercially available DNA based test is likely to be developed in the near future, which breeders can use to determine if LP is present in horses that do not have visible Appaloosa characteristics.

Not every Appaloosa exhibits visible coat spotting, but even apparently solid-colored horses that carry at least one dominant LP allele will exhibit characteristics such as vertically striped hooves, white sclera of the eye, and mottled skin around the eyes, lips, and genitalia. Appaloosas may also exhibit sabino or pinto type markings; as pinto genes may cover or obscure Appaloosa patterns, pinto breeding is discouraged by the ApHC, which will deny registration to horses with excessive white markings. The genes that create these different patterns can be present in the same horse. The Appaloosa Project, a genetic study group, researches the interactions of Appaloosa and pinto genes, and how they affect each other.

== History ==
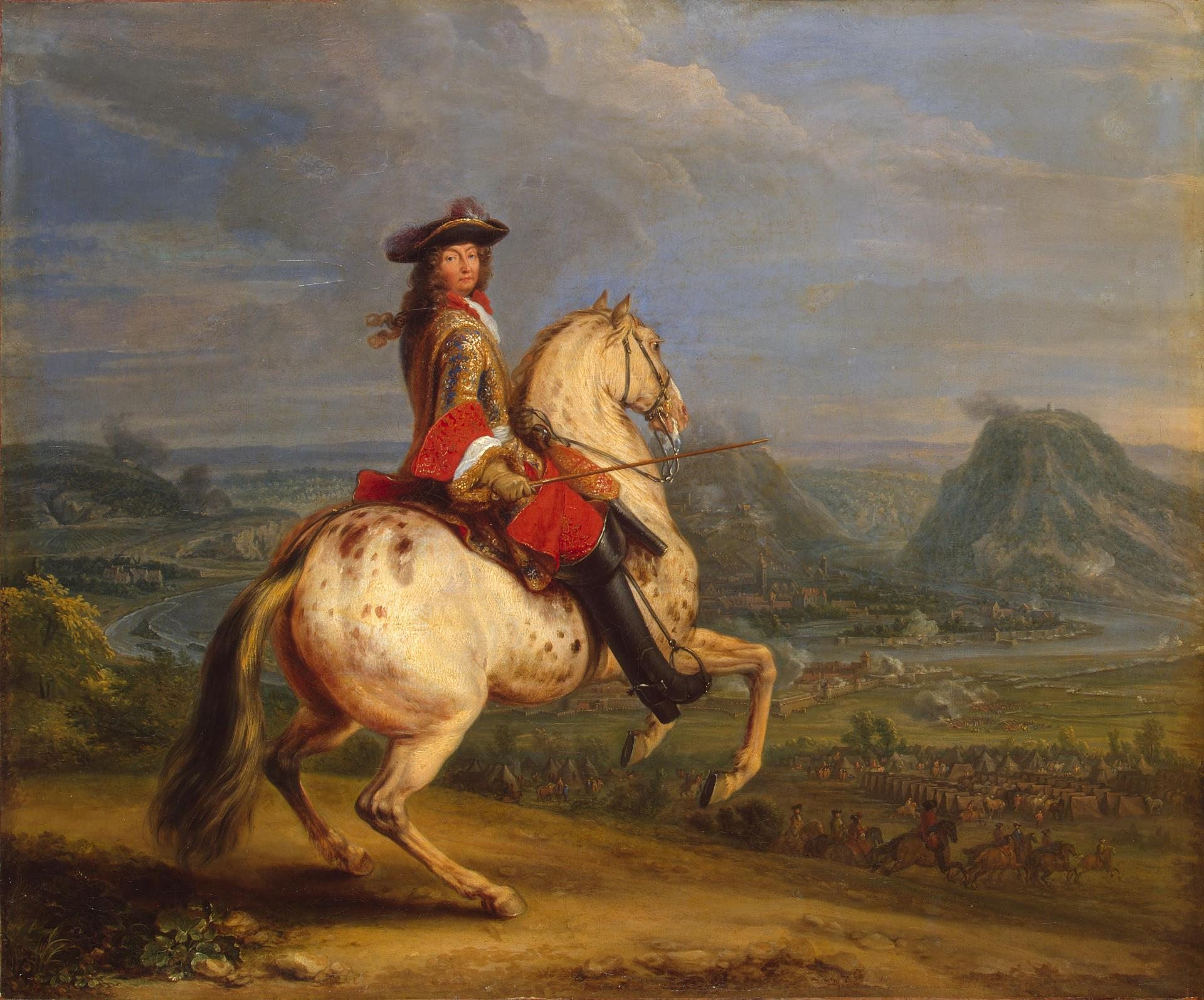
A 1674 painting of King Louis XIV of France on a spotted horse

Recent research has suggested that Eurasian prehistoric cave paintings depicting leopard-spotted horses may have accurately reflected a phenotype of ancient wild horse. Domesticated horses with leopard complex spotting patterns have been depicted in art dating as far back as Ancient Greece, Ancient Persia, and the Han Dynasty in China; later depictions appeared in 11th-century France and 12th-century England. French paintings from the 16th and 17th centuries show horses with spotted coats being used as riding horses, and other records indicate they were also used as coach horses at the court of Louis XIV of France. In mid-18th-century Europe, there was a great demand for horses with the leopard complex spotting pattern among the nobility and royalty. These horses were used in the schools of horsemanship, for parade use, and other forms of display. Modern horse breeds in Europe today that have leopard complex spotting include the Knabstrupper and the Pinzgau, or Noriker horse.

The Spanish probably obtained spotted horses through trade with southern Austria and Hungary, where the color pattern was known to exist. The Conquistadors and Spanish settlers then brought some vividly marked horses to the Americas when they first arrived in the early 16th century. One horse with snowflake patterning was listed with the 16 horses brought to Mexico by Cortez, and additional spotted horses were mentioned by Spanish writers by 1604. Others arrived in the western hemisphere when spotted horses went out of style in late 18th-century Europe, and were shipped to Mexico, California and Oregon.

=== Nez Perce people ===
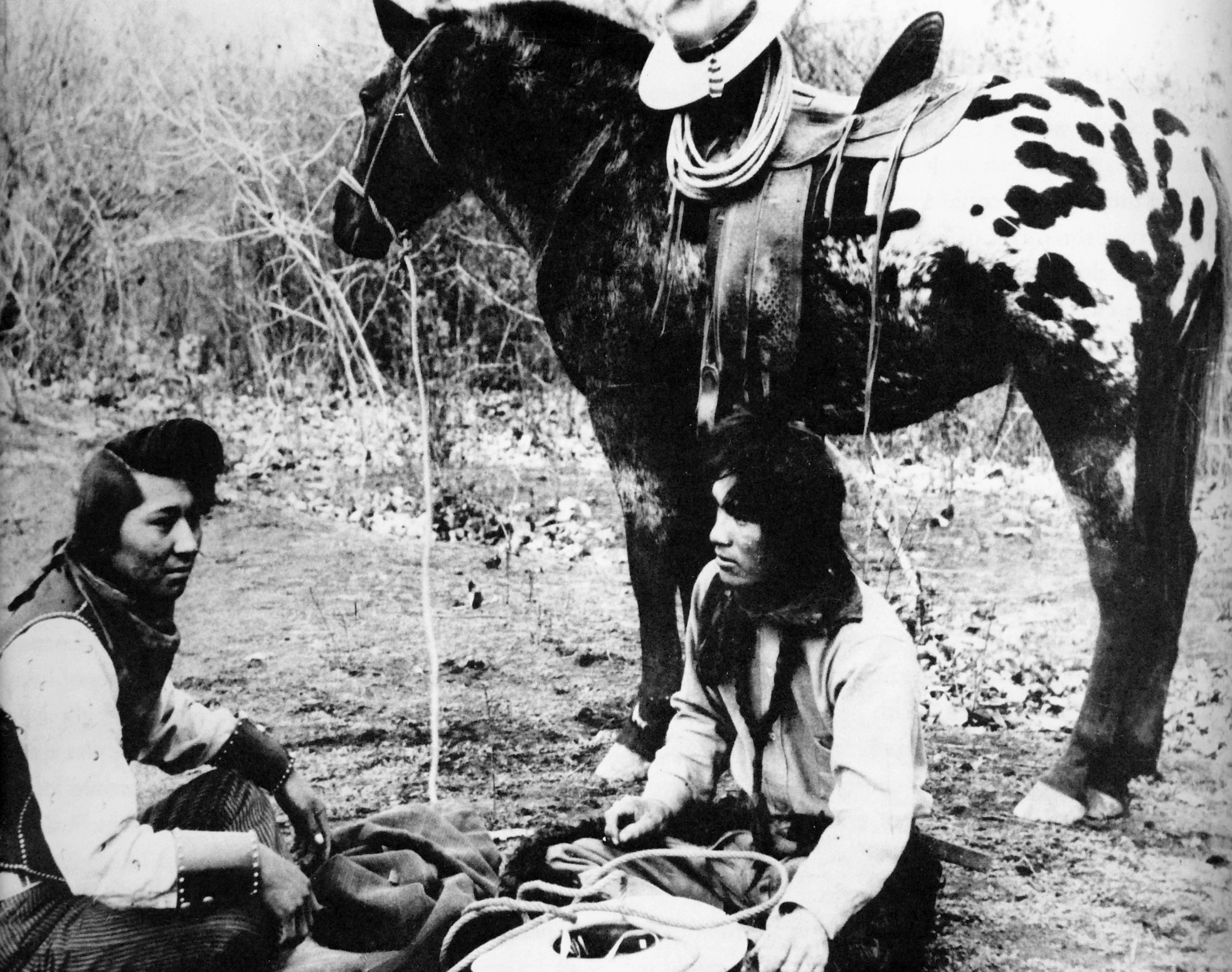
Two Nez Perce men with an Appaloosa, about 1895

The Nez Perce people lived in what today is eastern Washington, Oregon, and north central Idaho, where they engaged in agriculture as well as horse breeding. The Nez Perce first obtained horses from the Shoshone around 1730. They took advantage of the fact that they lived in excellent horse-breeding country, relatively safe from the raids of other tribes, and developed strict breeding selection practices for their animals, establishing breeding herds by 1750. They were one of the few tribes that actively used the practice of gelding inferior male horses and trading away poorer stock to remove unsuitable animals from the gene pool, and thus were notable as horse breeders by the early 19th century.

Early Nez Perce horses were considered to be of high quality. Meriwether Lewis of the Lewis and Clark Expedition wrote in his February 15, 1806, journal entry: "Their horses appear to be of an excellent race; they are lofty, eligantly [sic] formed, active and durable: in short many of them look like fine English coarsers [sic] and would make a figure in any country." Lewis did note spotting patterns, saying, "... some of these horses are pided [pied] with large spots of white irregularly scattered and intermixed with the black brown bey [sic] or some other dark colour". By "pied", Lewis may have been referring to leopard-spotted patterns seen in the modern Appaloosa, though Lewis also noted that "much the larger portion are of a uniform colour". The Appaloosa Horse Club estimates that only about ten percent of the horses owned by the Nez Perce at the time were spotted. While the Nez Perce originally had many solid-colored horses and only began to emphasize color in their breeding some time after the visit of Lewis and Clark, by the late 19th century they had many spotted horses. As white settlers moved into traditional Nez Perce lands, a successful trade in horses enriched the Nez Perce, who in 1861 bred horses described as "elegant chargers, fit to mount a prince." At a time when ordinary horses could be purchased for $15, non-Indians who had purchased Appaloosa horses from the Nez Perce turned down offers of as much as $600.

=== Nez Perce War ===
Peace with the United States dated back to an alliance arranged by Lewis and Clark, but the encroachment of gold miners in the 1860s and settlers in the 1870s put pressure on the Nez Perce. Although a treaty of 1855 originally allowed them to keep most of their traditional land, another in 1863 reduced the land allotted to them by 90 percent. The Nez Perce who refused to give up their land under the 1863 treaty included a band living in the Wallowa Valley of Oregon, led by Heinmot Tooyalakekt, widely known as Chief Joseph. Tensions rose, and in May 1877, General Oliver Otis Howard called a council and ordered the non-treaty bands to move to the reservation. Chief Joseph considered military resistance futile, and by June 14, 1877, had gathered about 600 people at a site near present-day Grangeville, Idaho. But on that day a small group of warriors staged an attack on nearby white settlers, which led to the Nez Perce War. After several small battles in Idaho, more than 800 Nez Perce, mostly non-warriors, took 2000 head of various livestock including horses and fled into Montana, then traveled southeast, dipping into Yellowstone National Park. A small number of Nez Perce fighters, probably fewer than 200, successfully held off larger forces of the U.S. Army in several skirmishes, including the two-day Battle of the Big Hole in southwestern Montana. They then moved northeast and attempted to seek refuge with the Crow Nation; rebuffed, they headed for safety in Canada.

Throughout this journey of about 1,400 miles (2,300 km) the Nez Perce relied heavily on their fast, agile and hardy Appaloosa horses. The journey came to an end when they stopped to rest near the Bears Paw Mountains in Montana, 40 miles (64 km) from the Canada–US border. Unbeknownst to the Nez Perce, Colonel Nelson A. Miles had led an infantry-cavalry column from Fort Keogh in pursuit. On October 5, 1877, after a five-day fight, Joseph surrendered. The battle—and the war—was over. With most of the war chiefs dead, and the noncombatants cold and starving, Joseph declared that he would "fight no more forever".

=== Aftermath of the Nez Perce War ===
When the U.S. 7th Cavalry accepted the surrender of Chief Joseph and the remaining Nez Perce, they immediately took more than 1,000 of the tribe's horses, sold what they could and shot many of the rest. But a significant population of horses had been left behind in the Wallowa valley when the Nez Perce began their retreat, and additional animals escaped or were abandoned along the way. The Nez Perce were ultimately settled on reservation lands in north central Idaho, (Note: Chief Joseph and his band were settled in central Washington on the Colville Indian Reservation.) were allowed few horses, and were required by the Army to crossbreed to draft horses in an attempt to create farm horses. The Nez Perce tribe never regained its former position as breeders of Appaloosas. In the late 20th century, they began a program to develop a new horse breed, the Nez Perce horse, with the intent to resurrect their horse culture, tradition of selective breeding, and horsemanship.

Although a remnant population of Appaloosa horses remained after 1877, they were virtually forgotten as a distinct breed for almost 60 years. A few quality horses continued to be bred, mostly those captured or purchased by settlers and used as working ranch horses. Others were used in circuses and related forms of entertainment, such as Buffalo Bill's Wild West Show and Ringling Bros. and Barnum & Bailey Circus. The horses were originally called "Palouse horses" by settlers, a reference to the Palouse River that ran through the heart of what was once Nez Perce country. Gradually, the name evolved into "Apalouse", and then "Appaloosa". Other early variations of the name included "Appalucy", "Apalousey" and "Appaloosie". In one 1948 book, the breed was called the "Opelousa horse", described as a "hardy tough breed of Indian and Spanish horse" used by backwoodsmen of the late 18th century to transport goods to New Orleans for sale. By the 1950s, "Appaloosa" was regarded as the correct spelling.

=== Revitalization ===
The state of Idaho offers a license plate featuring the Appaloosa horse.

The Appaloosa came to the attention of the general public in January 1937 in Western Horseman magazine when Francis D. Haines, a history professor from Lewiston, Idaho, published an article describing the breed's history and urging its preservation. Haines had performed extensive research, traveling with a friend and Appaloosa aficionado named George Hatley, visiting numerous Nez Perce villages, collecting history, and taking photographs. The article generated strong interest in the horse breed, and led to the founding of the Appaloosa Horse Club (ApHC) by Claude Thompson and a small group of other dedicated breeders in 1938. The registry was originally housed in Moro, Oregon; but in 1947 the organization moved to Moscow, Idaho, under the leadership of George Hatley. The Appaloosa Museum foundation was formed in 1975 to preserve the history of the Appaloosa horse. The Western Horseman magazine, and particularly its longtime publisher, Dick Spencer, continued to support and promote the breed through many subsequent articles.

A significant crossbreeding influence used to revitalize the Appaloosa was the Arabian horse, as evidenced by early registration lists that show Arabian-Appaloosa crossbreeds as ten of the first fifteen horses registered with the ApHC. For example, one of Claude Thompson's major herd sires was Ferras, an Arabian stallion bred by W.K. Kellogg from horses imported from the Crabbet Arabian Stud of England. Ferras sired Red Eagle, a prominent Appaloosa stallion added to the Appaloosa Hall of Fame in 1988. Later, Thoroughbred and American Quarter Horse lines were added, as well as crosses from other breeds, including Morgans and Standardbreds. In 1983 the ApHC reduced the number of allowable outcrosses to three main breeds: the Arabian, the American Quarter Horse and the Thoroughbred.

By 1978 the ApHC was the third largest horse registry for light horse breeds. From 1938 to 2007 more than 670,000 Appaloosas were registered by the ApHC. The state of Idaho adopted the Appaloosa as its official state horse on March 25, 1975, when Idaho Governor Cecil Andrus signed the enabling legislation. Idaho also offers a custom license plate featuring an Appaloosa, the first state to offer a plate featuring a state horse.

== Registration ==
Located in Moscow, Idaho, the ApHC is the principal body for the promotion and preservation of the Appaloosa breed and is an international organization. Affiliate Appaloosa organizations exist in many South American and European countries, as well as South Africa, Australia, New Zealand, Canada, Mexico and Israel. The Appaloosa Horse Club has 33,000 members as of 2010, circulation of the Appaloosa Journal, which is included with most types of membership, was at 32,000 in 2008. The American Appaloosa Association was founded in 1983 by members opposed to the registration of plain-colored horses, as a result of the color rule controversy. Based in Missouri, it has a membership of more than 2,000 as of 2008. Other "Appaloosa" registries have been founded for horses with leopard complex genetics that are not affiliated with the ApHC. One such registry, The Colorado Ranger Horse, also known as CRHA was founded by Mike Ruby in 1937, which relies on verified pedigree and not on color alone. These registries tend to have different foundation bloodstock and histories than the North American Appaloosa. The ApHC is by far the largest Appaloosa horse registry, and it hosts one of the world's largest breed shows.

The Appaloosa is "a breed defined by ApHC bloodline requirements and preferred characteristics, including coat pattern". In other words, the Appaloosa is a distinct breed from limited bloodlines with distinct physical traits and a desired color, referred to as a "color preference". Appaloosas are not strictly a "color breed". All ApHC-registered Appaloosas must be the offspring of two registered Appaloosa parents or a registered Appaloosa and a horse from an approved breed registry, which includes Arabian horses, Quarter Horses, and Thoroughbreds. In all cases, one parent must always be a regular registered Appaloosa. The only exception to the bloodline requirements is in the case of Appaloosa-colored geldings or spayed mares with unknown pedigrees; owners may apply for "hardship registration" for these non-breeding horses. The ApHC does not accept horses with draft, pony, Pinto, or Paint breeding, and requires mature Appaloosas to stand, unshod, at least 14 hands (56 inches, 142 cm). If a horse has excessive white markings not associated with the Appaloosa pattern (such as those characteristic of a pinto) it cannot be registered unless it is verified through DNA testing that both parents have ApHC registration.

Certain other characteristics are used to determine if a horse receives "regular" registration: striped hooves, white sclera visible when the eye is in a normal position, and mottled (spotted) skin around the eyes, lips, and genitalia. As the Appaloosa is one of the few horse breeds to exhibit skin mottling, this characteristic "...is a very basic and decisive indication of an Appaloosa." Appaloosas born with visible coat pattern, or mottled skin and at least one other characteristic, are registered with "regular" papers and have full show and breeding privileges. A horse that meets bloodline requirements but is born without the recognized color pattern and characteristics can still be registered with the ApHC as a "non-characteristic" Appaloosa. These solid-colored, "non-characteristic" Appaloosas may not be shown at ApHC events unless the owner verifies the parentage through DNA testing and pays a supplementary fee to enter the horse into the ApHC's Performance Permit Program (PPP).

=== Color rule controversy ===
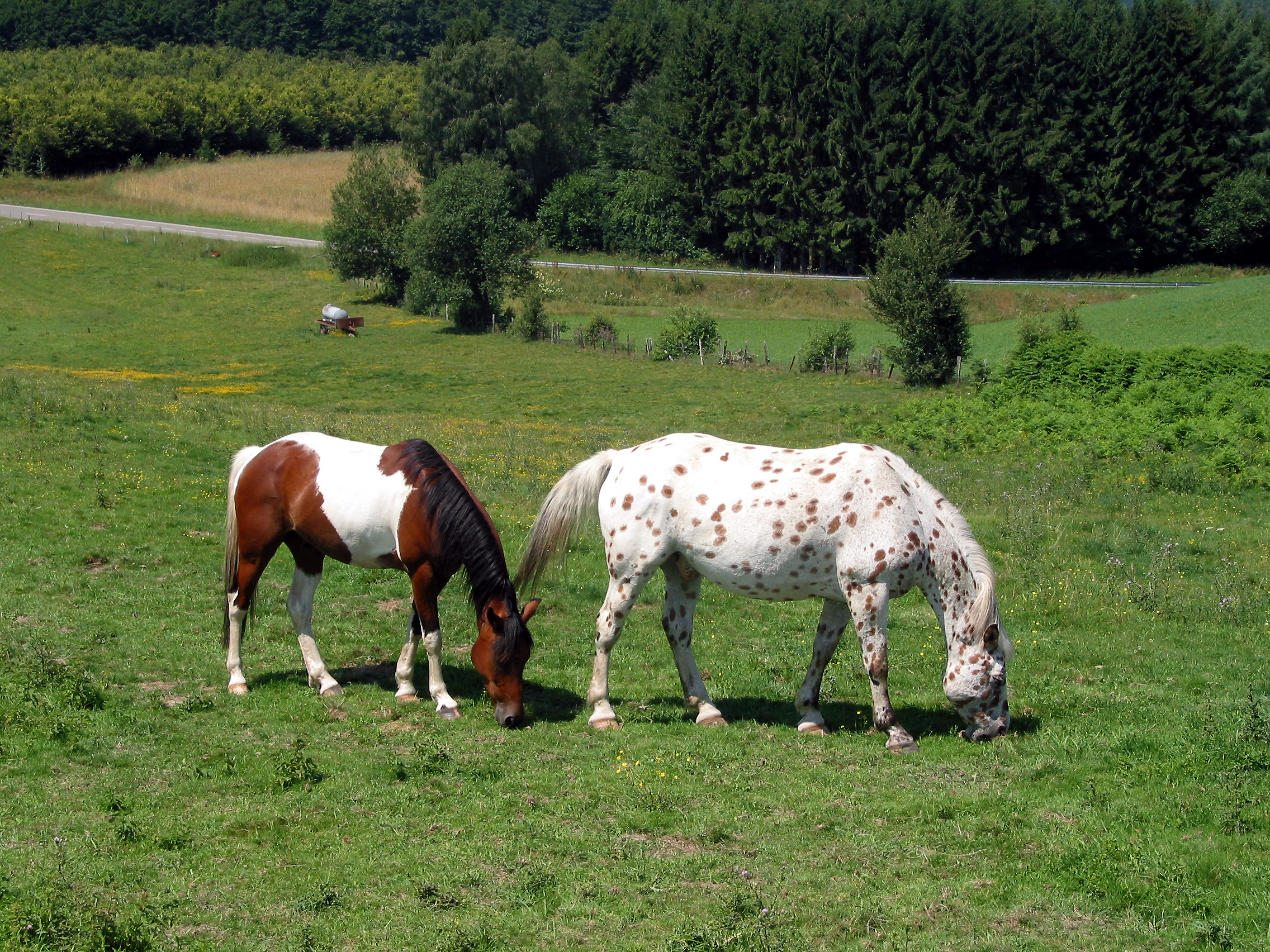
A pinto horse (left) has different markings than a Leopard Appaloosa (right).

During the 1940s and 1950s, when both the Appaloosa Horse Club (ApHC) and the American Quarter Horse Association (AQHA) were in their formative years, minimally marked or roan Appaloosas were sometimes used in Quarter Horse breeding programs. At the same time, it was noted that two solid-colored registered Quarter Horse parents would sometimes produce what Quarter Horse aficionados call a "cropout", a foal with white coloration similar to that of an Appaloosa or Pinto. For a considerable time, until DNA testing could verify parentage, the AQHA refused to register such horses. The ApHC did accept cropout horses that exhibited proper Appaloosa traits, while cropout pintos became the core of the American Paint Horse Association. Famous Appaloosas who were cropouts included Colida, Joker B, Bright Eyes Brother and Wapiti.

In the late 1970s, the color controversy went in the opposite direction within the Appaloosa registry. The ApHC's decision in 1982 to allow solid-colored or "non-characteristic" Appaloosas to be registered resulted in substantial debate within the Appaloosa breeding community. Until then, a foal of Appaloosa parents that had insufficient color was often denied registration, although non-characteristic Appaloosas were allowed into the registry. But breeder experience had shown that some solid Appaloosas could throw a spotted foal in a subsequent generation, at least when bred to a spotted Appaloosa. In addition, many horses with a solid coat exhibited secondary characteristics such as skin mottling, the white sclera, and striped hooves. The controversy stirred by the ApHC's decision was intense. In 1983 a number of Appaloosa breeders opposed to the registration of solid-colored horses formed the American Appaloosa Association, a breakaway organization.

== Uses ==
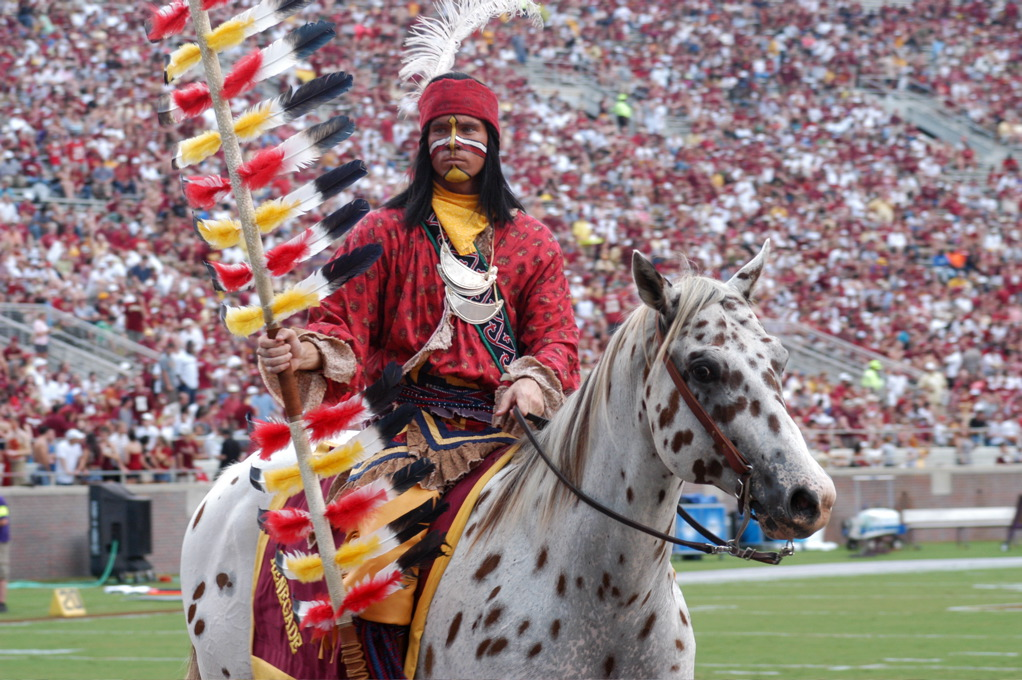
A leopard Appaloosa is part of the mascot for Florida State University's football team, the Seminoles, named for the Seminole Tribe of Florida.

Appaloosas are used extensively for both Western and English riding. Western competitions include cutting, reining, roping and O-Mok-See sports such as barrel racing (known as the Camas Prairie Stump Race in Appaloosa-only competition) and pole bending (called the Nez Percé Stake Race at breed shows). English disciplines they are used in include eventing, show jumping, and fox hunting. They are common in endurance riding competitions, as well as in casual trail riding. Appaloosas are also bred for horse racing, with an active breed racing association promoting the sport. They are generally used for middle-distance racing at distances between 350 yards (320 m) and 0.5 miles (0.80 km); an Appaloosa holds the all-breed record for the 4.5 furlongs (3,000 ft; 910 m) distance, set in 1989.

Appaloosas are often used in Western movies and television series. Examples include "Cojo Rojo" in the Marlon Brando film The Appaloosa, "Zip Cochise" ridden by John Wayne in the 1966 film El Dorado and "Cowboy", the mount of Matt Damon in True Grit. An Appaloosa horse is part of the controversial mascot team for the Florida State Seminoles, Chief Osceola and Renegade; even though the Seminole Tribe of Florida were not directly associated with Appaloosa horses.

=== Influence ===
There are several American horse breeds with leopard coloring and Appaloosa ancestry. These include the Pony of the Americas and the Colorado Ranger. Appaloosas were also crossbred with gaited horse breeds in an attempt to create leopard-spotted ambling horse breeds, including the Walkaloosa, the Spanish Jennet Horse, and the Tiger horse. Because such crossbred offspring are not eligible for ApHC registration, their owners have formed breed registries for horses with leopard complex patterns and gaited ability. In 1995 the Nez Perce tribe began a program to develop a new and distinct horse breed, the Nez Perce Horse, based on crossbreeding the Appaloosa with the Akhal-Teke breed from Central Asia. Appaloosa stallions have also been exported to Denmark to add new blood to the Knabstrupper breed.

== Health issues ==
=== Genetically linked vision issues ===
Two genetically linked conditions are linked to blindness in Appaloosas, both associated with the Leopard complex color pattern.

Appaloosas have an eightfold greater risk of developing Equine Recurrent Uveitis (ERU) than all other breeds combined. Up to 25 percent of all horses with ERU may be Appaloosas. Uveitis in horses has many causes, including eye trauma, disease, and bacterial, parasitic and viral infections, but ERU is characterized by recurring episodes of uveitis, rather than a single incident. If not treated, ERU can lead to blindness. Eighty percent of all uveitis cases are found in Appaloosas with physical characteristics including roan or light-colored coat patterns, little pigment around the eyelids and sparse hair in the mane and tail denoting the most at-risk individuals. Researchers may have identified a gene region containing an allele that makes the breed more susceptible to the disease.

Appaloosas that are homozygous for the leopard complex (LP) gene are also at risk for congenital stationary night blindness (CSNB). This form of night blindness has been linked with the leopard complex since the 1970s, and in 2007 a "significant association" between LP and CSNB was identified. CSNB is a disorder that causes an affected animal to lack night vision, although day vision is normal. It is an inherited disorder, present from birth, and does not progress over time. Studies in 2008 and 2010 indicate that both CSNB and leopard complex spotting patterns are linked to TRPM1.

=== Drug rules ===
In 2007 the ApHC implemented new drug rules allowing Appaloosas to show with the drugs furosemide, known by the trade name of Lasix, and acetazolamide. Furosemide is used to prevent horses who bleed from the nose when subjected to strenuous work from having bleeding episodes when in competition, and is widely used in horse racing. Acetazolamide ("Acet") is used for treating horses with the genetic disease hyperkalemic periodic paralysis (HYPP), and prevents affected animals from having seizures. (Note: Acetazolamide is not to be confused with acepromazine ("Ace"), a tranquilizer, which is illegal in all forms of competition.) Acet is only allowed for horses that test positive for HYPP and have HYPP status noted on their registration papers. The ApHC recommends that Appaloosas that trace to certain American Quarter Horse bloodlines be tested for HYPP, and owners have the option to choose to place HYPP testing results on registration papers. Foals of AQHA-registered stallions and mares born on or after January 1, 2007 that carry HYPP will be required to be HYPP tested and have their HYPP status designated on their registration papers.

Both drugs are controversial, in part because they are considered drug maskers and diuretics that can make it difficult to detect the presence of other drugs in the horse's system. On one side, it is argued that the United States Equestrian Federation (USEF), which sponsors show competition for many different horse breeds, and the International Federation for Equestrian Sports (FEI), which governs international and Olympic equestrian competition, ban the use of furosemide. On the other side of the controversy, several major stock horse registries that sanction their own shows, including the American Quarter Horse Association, American Paint Horse Association, and the Palomino Horse Breeders of America, allow acetazolamide and furosemide to be used within 24 hours of showing under certain circumstances.
