= Nez Perce Horse =

Breed of horse

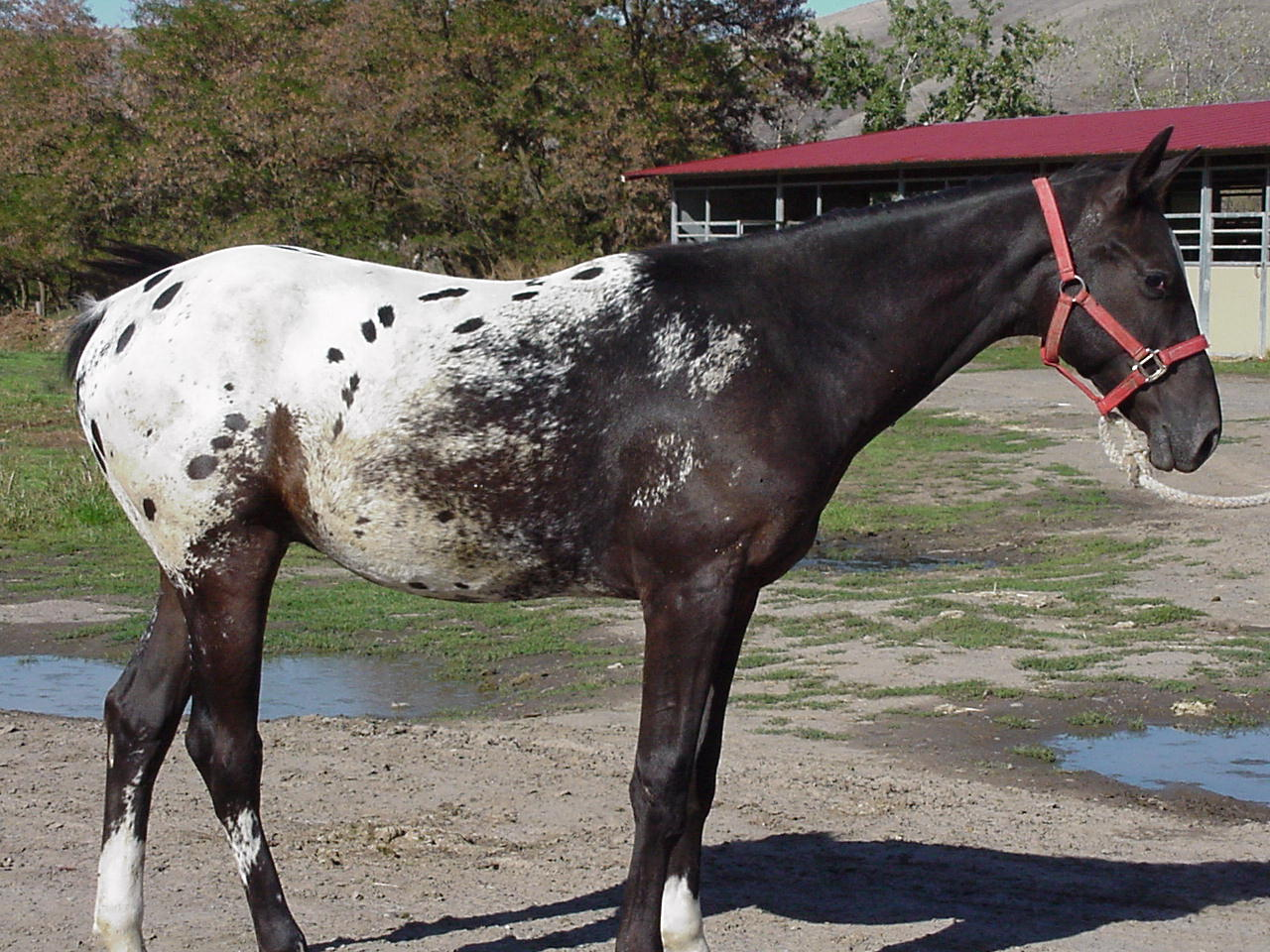
- Nez Perce Horse
- Country of origin: Idaho, United States

The Nez Perce Horse is a spotted horse breed of the Nez Perce Tribe of Idaho. The Nez Perce Horse Registry (NPHR) program began in 1995 in Lapwai, Idaho and is based on cross-breeding the old-line Appaloosa horses (the Wallowa herd) with an ancient Central Asian breed called Akhal-Teke.

This program seeks to re-establish the horse culture of the Nez Perce, a tradition of selective breeding of Appaloosa horses and horsemanship that was nearly destroyed by the U.S. Government in the 19th century. The breeding program was financed by the United States Department of Health and Human Services, the Nez Perce Tribe and a nonprofit group called the First Nations Development Institute, which promotes such businesses.

The Nez Perce Horse is "fit to carry the Nez Perce name," according to Rudy Shebala, director of the Tribe's Horse Registry and the Nez Perce Young Horsemen program.

The Akhal-Teke is an ancient breed that originated in Turkmenistan (near Afghanistan). They are known for their superb endurance and "metallic" coats. The Akhal-Teke coat colors commonly include palominos, buckskins, and dark bays. A typical Nez Perce Horse is a buckskin or palomino with Appaloosa characteristics—mottled skin with a spotted coat or a blanket.

The Nez Perce Horse's conformation is longer and leaner than the Quarter Horses or other stock horses of the Western U.S., with narrower shoulders and hindquarters, a longer back, and a lean runner's appearance. They are good at long rides and compete well in endurance races; they are also good jumpers. The Nez Perce Horses are often gaited, with a fast and smooth running walk.

The Nez Perce people are historically known for their selective horse breeding practices, according to NPHR breeders Jon and Rosa Yearout.
