= Jinete =

Type of light cavalry originating in Spain

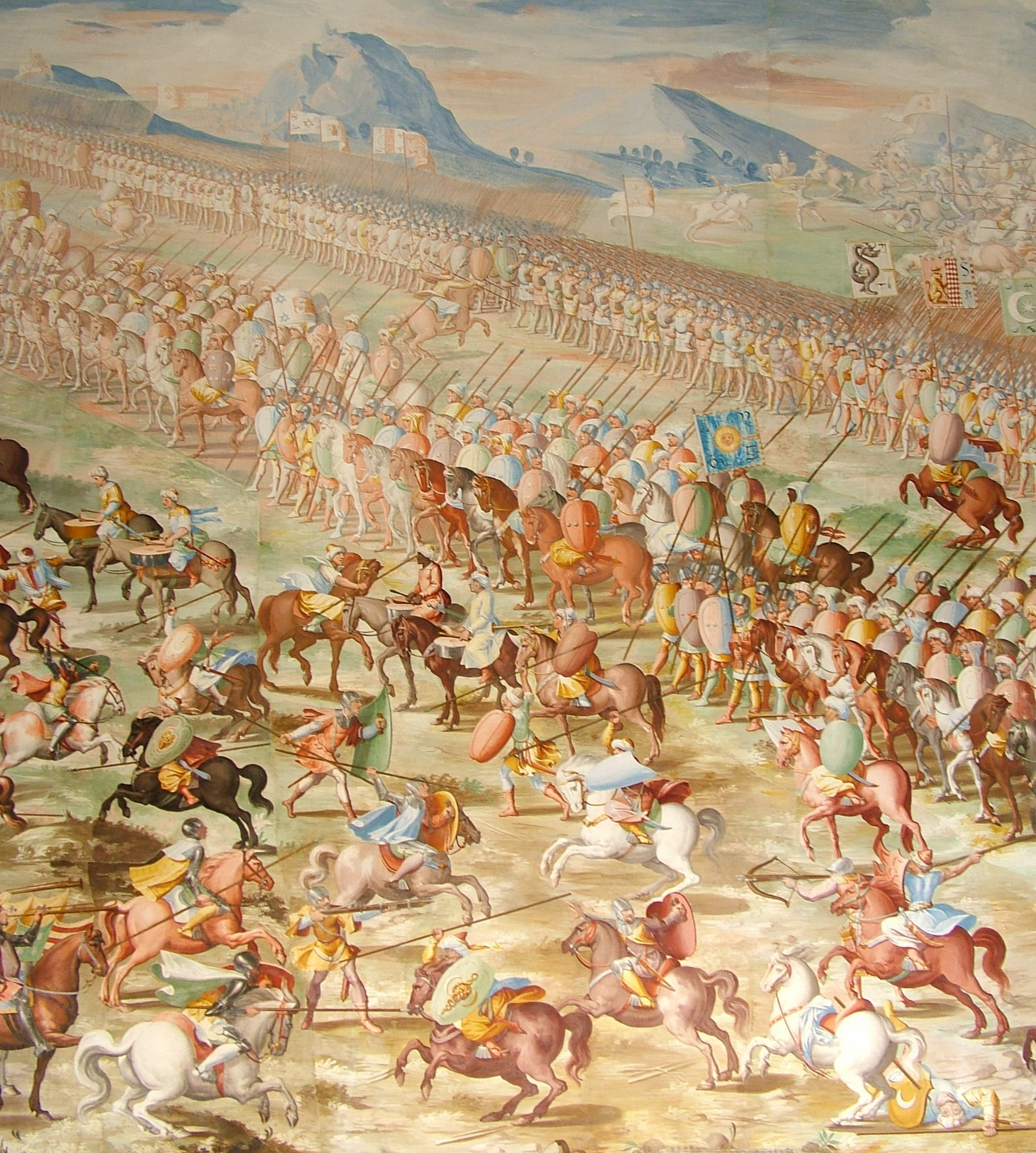
Jinetes skirmish at the Battle of Higueruela, 1431

Jinete (Spanish pronunciation: [xiˈnete]) is Spanish for "horseman", especially in the context of light cavalry.

== Etymology ==
The word jinete is used in Castilian and the Provençal dialect of Occitan to refer to skilled riders, particularly those whose work requires expert horsemanship. The term is generally derived from Hispano-Arabic zanáti, a gentilic form of Zanāta, the name of the medieval Berber Zenata confederation. Felipe Maíllo Salgado has linked the medieval terms jinete and jineta to the history of Spanish cavalry and their lexical development. The Portuguese equivalent is ginete. The same word also gives English jennet, meaning a small Spanish horse.

== Medieval Hispanic light cavalry ==
As a military term, jinete (also spelled ginete or genitour) means a Spanish light horseman that wore leather armor and was armed with javelins, a spear, a sword, and a shield. They were a type of mounted troop developed in the early Middle Ages in response to the massed light cavalry of the Moors. Often fielded in significant numbers by the Spanish, and at times the most numerous of the Spanish mounted troops, they played an important role in Spanish mounted warfare throughout the Reconquista until the sixteenth century. They were to serve successfully in the Italian Wars under Gonzalo de Córdoba and Ramón de Cardona.

Sir Charles Oman describes their tactics thus:

Their tactics were not to close but to hover round their opponents, continually harassing them till they should give ground or break their formation, when a chance would occur of pushing a charge home

The tactics of the genitours were to swarm around the enemy, to overwhelm him with darts, to draw off if he charged in mass, but to hang upon his flanks and charge him when he grew tired, or fell into disorder

In addition, Philippe Contamine records they used the tactic of feigned retreat (tourna-fuye).

Jinetes existed in considerable numbers. During the period 1485–9, Castilian armies mustered between 11,000 and 13,000 jinetes. Some of these were provided by the Military Orders. The Master of Santiago provided 300, while the Master of Calatrava was responsible for a further 450. In May 1493, a number of standing companies were established in Castile called the guardas viejas (veteran guard). These included five captaincies of 100 jinetes. In 1496, the guardas reales (royal guard) of Castile included 130 jinetes. Out of 600 cavalry in the Spanish expeditionary force to Italy in 1495, 500 were jinetes.

== Contemporary usage ==
In Mexico, jinete can mean "rodeo rider", hence "cowboy".

In Castilian, it is used adjectivally of a rider who knows how to ride a horse, especially those who are fluent or champions at equestrian practices, such as the gaucho, the huaso of the plains, the cowboy, Vaquero, or charro among others. It is also used in the Spanish Army to designate personnel belonging to the cavalry arm.

In its original Spanish title The Four Horsemen of the Apocalypse by Vicente Blasco Ibáñez is Los Cuatro Jinetes del Apocalipsis. Canción de jinete is a poem by Federico García Lorca.

The novel El jinete polaco by Antonio Muñoz Molina was published in 1991.
