= TRPM1 =

Protein-coding gene in humans

Identifiers
- Aliases: TRPM1, CSNB1C, LTRPC1, MLSN1, transient receptor potential cation channel subfamily M member 1
- External IDs: OMIM: 603576; MGI: 1330305; GeneCards: TRPM1

Gene location (Human)
Chr.	Chromosome 15 (human)
Band	15q13.3	Start	31,001,061 bp
Band	15q13.3	End	31,161,273 bp

Gene location (Mouse)
Chr.	Chromosome 7 (mouse)
Band	7 C|7 34.61 cM	Start	63,803,583 bp
Band	7 C|7 34.61 cM	End	63,919,523 bp
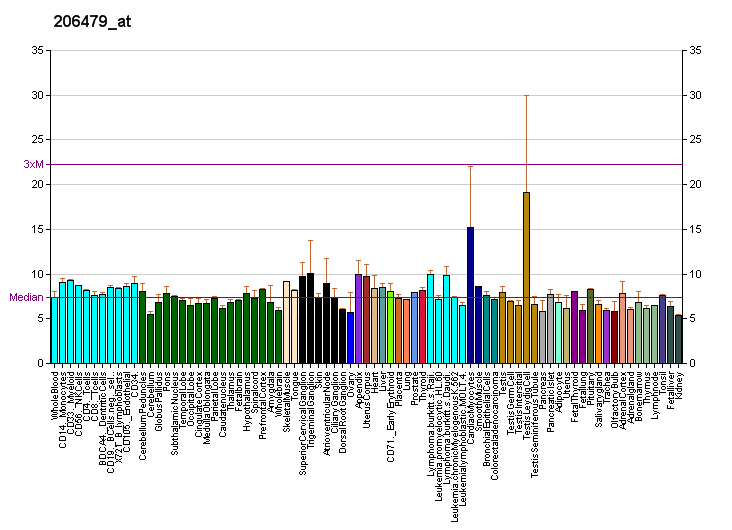
RNA expression pattern
Bgee	Human / Mouse (ortholog); Top expressed in: retinal pigment epithelium; nipple; testicle; skin of leg; skin of abdomen; vulva; gonad; skin of thigh; human penis; C1 segment / Top expressed in: iris; ciliary body; neural layer of retina; hair follicle; lens; retinal pigment epithelium; epithelium of lens; spermatocyte; stria vascularis; Ileal epithelium; More reference expression data
BioGPS	More reference expression data
Gene ontology
Molecular function	calcium channel activity; ion channel activity; cation channel activity
Cellular component	integral component of membrane; membrane; plasma membrane; integral component of plasma membrane; new growing cell tip
Biological process	G protein-coupled glutamate receptor signaling pathway; calcium ion transport into cytosol; response to stimulus; ion transport; protein tetramerization; calcium ion transmembrane transport; retinal rod cell development; cellular response to light stimulus; visual perception; signal transduction; ion transmembrane transport; transmembrane transport; cation transmembrane transport
Sources:Amigo / QuickGO
Orthologs
Databases	NCBI: entry; OMA: entry
Species	Human	Mouse
Entrez	4308	17364
Ensembl	ENSG00000274965; ENSG00000134160	ENSMUSG00000030523
UniProt	Q7Z4N2	Q2TV84
RefSeq (mRNA)	NM_001252020; NM_001252024; NM_001252030; NM_002420	NM_001039104; NM_018752
RefSeq (protein)	NP_001238949; NP_001238953; NP_001238959; NP_002411	NP_001034193; NP_061222
Location (UCSC)	Chr 15: 31 – 31.16 Mb	Chr 7: 63.8 – 63.92 Mb
PubMed search
- Wikidata
View/Edit Human	View/Edit Mouse

Transient receptor potential cation channel subfamily M member 1 is a protein that in humans is encoded by the TRPM1 gene.

== Function ==
The protein encoded by this gene is a member of the transient receptor potential (TRP) family of non-selective cation channels. It is expressed in the retina, in a subset of bipolar cells termed ON bipolar cells. These cells form synapses with either rods or cones, collecting signals from them. In the dark, the signal arrives in the form of the neurotransmitter glutamate, which is detected by a G protein-coupled receptor (GPCR) signal transduction cascade. Detection of glutamate by the GPCR Metabotropic glutamate receptor 6 results in closing of the TRPM1 channel. At the onset of light, glutamate release is halted and mGluR6 is deactivated; this results in opening of the TRPM1 channel, influx of sodium and calcium, and depolarization of the bipolar cell.

In addition to the retina, TRPM1 is also expressed in melanocytes, which are melanin-producing cells in the skin. The expression of TRPM1 is inversely correlated with melanoma aggressiveness, suggesting that it might suppress melanoma metastasis. However, subsequent work showed that a microRNA located in an intron of the TRPM1 gene, rather than the TRPM1 protein itself, is responsible for the tumor suppressor function. The expression of both TRPM1 and the microRNA are regulated by the Microphthalmia-associated transcription factor.

== Clinical significance ==
Mutations in TRPM1 are associated with congenital stationary night blindness in humans and coat spotting patterns in Appaloosa horses.

== See also ==
- TRPM
