= Palomino rabbit =

Breed of rabbit

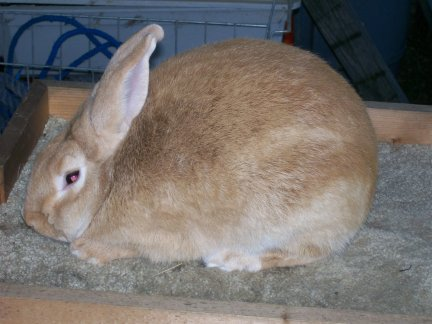
A palomino rabbit.

The Palomino rabbit is a breed of rabbit, normally 8–12 pounds (3.6–5.4 kg) in weight, which is generally colored golden or lynx. It was first bred in the United States. As with the palomino horse, the rabbit gets its name from its color.

== History ==
The Palomino rabbit was created by Mark Youngs at Lone Pine Rabbitry in Coulee Dam, Washington. It was based on Youngs' previous American Beige breed. The breed was initially named Washingtonian in 1952 at the American Rabbit Breeders Association's national convention. The name Palomino was adopted in 1953, and the breed was recognized in 1957. The breed became more common in the 1960s.

== Description ==
Palomino rabbits have a fawny brown color with brown eyes and their bodies are larger than most other breeds. Their appearance is similar to the New Zealand rabbit and they have two main color variants, golden and lynx.

== See also ==
- List of rabbit breeds
