= Palomino =

Genetic color in horses

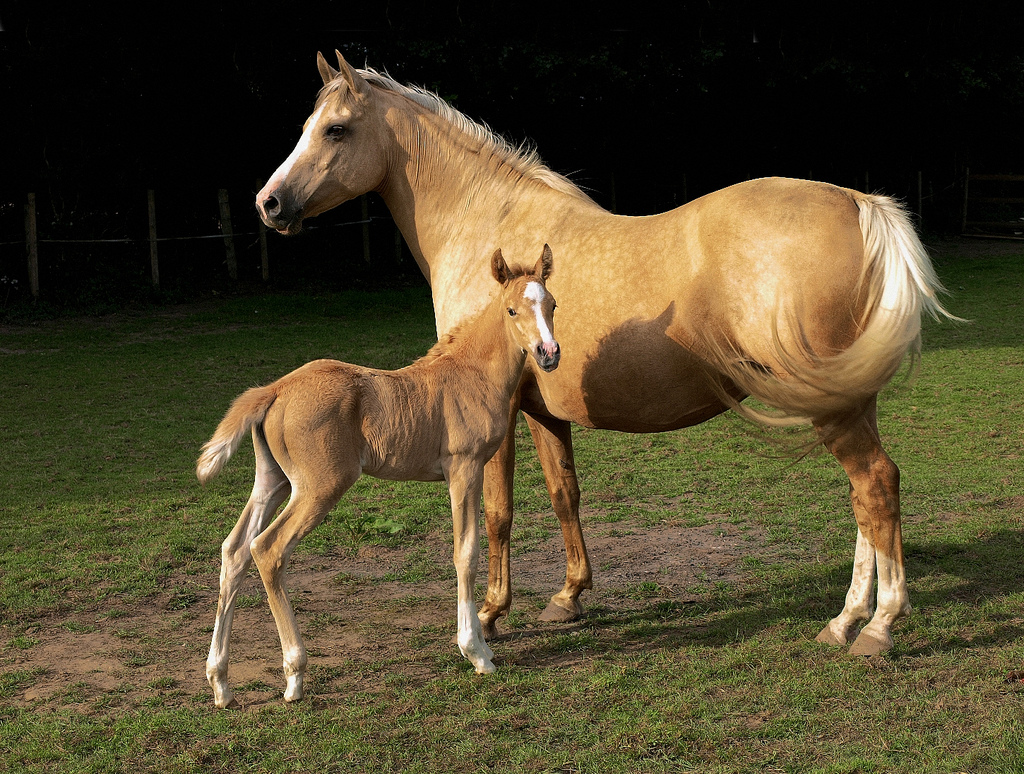
A palomino mare with a chestnut foal. This golden shade is widely recognized as palomino.

Palomino is a genetic color in horses, consisting of a gold coat and white mane and tail; the degree of whiteness can vary from bright white to yellow. The palomino color derived from the breeding of Spanish horses in the United States. Genetically, the palomino color is created by a single allele of a dilution gene called the cream gene working on a "red" (chestnut) base coat. Palomino is created by a genetic mechanism of incomplete dominance, hence it is not considered true-breeding. However, most color breed registries that record palomino horses were founded before equine coat color genetics were understood as well as they are today, therefore the standard definition of a palomino is based on the visible coat color, not heritability nor the underlying presence of the dilution gene.

Due to their distinct color, palominos stand out in a show ring, and are much sought after as parade horses. They were particularly popular in movies and television during the 1940s and 1950s. One of the most famous palomino horses was Trigger, known as "the smartest horse in movies", the faithful mount of the Hollywood cowboy star Roy Rogers. Another famous palomino was Mister Ed (real name Bamboo Harvester) who starred on his own TV show in the 1960s. A palomino was also featured in the show Xena: Warrior Princess (1995–2001). Xena's horse Argo was portrayed by a palomino mare named Tilly. In today's horse breeding the palomino color can be created by crossing a chestnut with a cremello.

Palomino is a Spanish word meaning juvenile pigeon (the diminutive of paloma, pigeon) and its equine usage refers to the color of such birds.

== Description ==
Palomino color shades

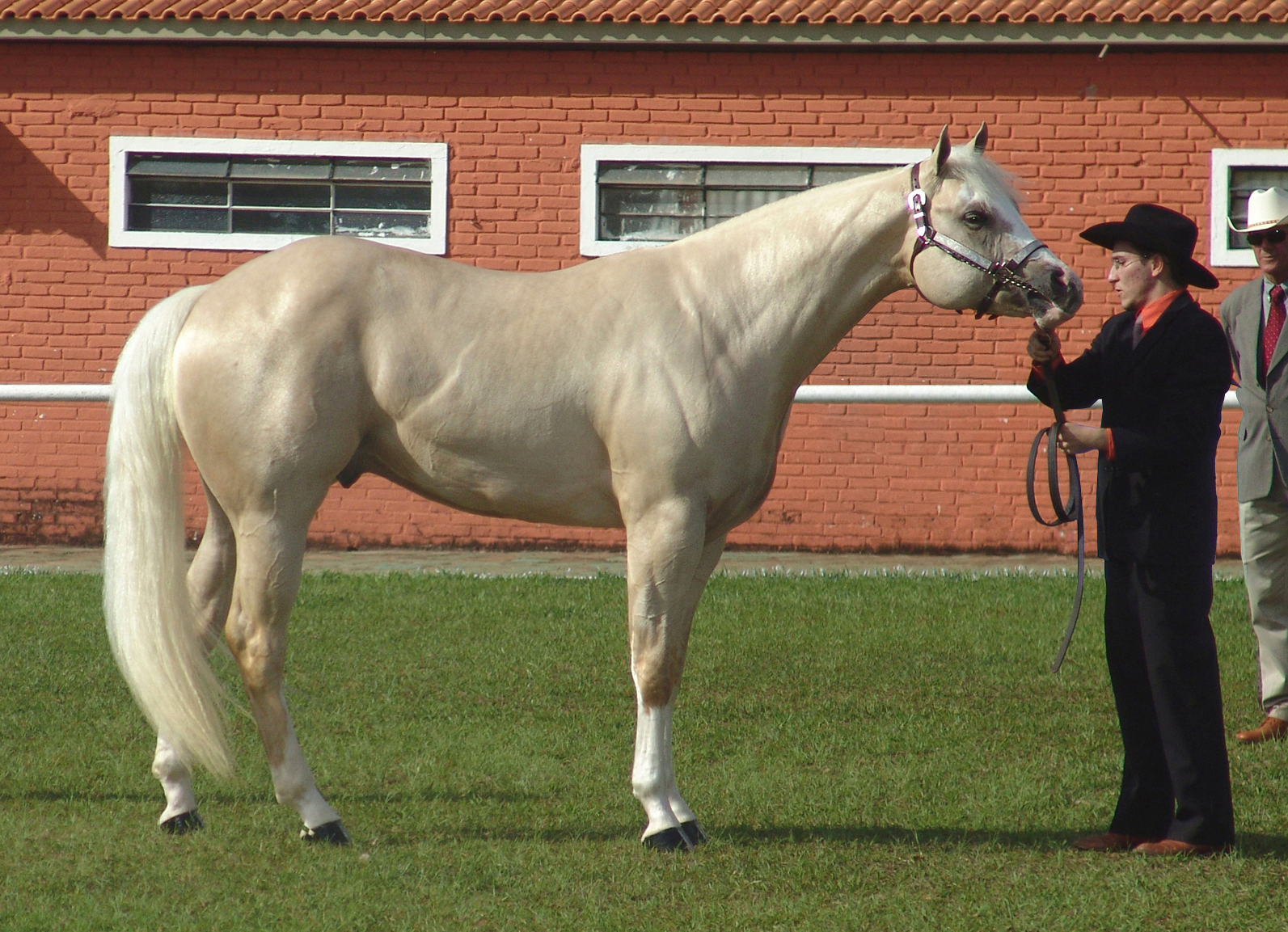
A light palomino (also known as Isabelline). This shade is at the lighter end of the color range for a Palomino horse, but as the eyes and skin are dark, the horse is not a cremello.

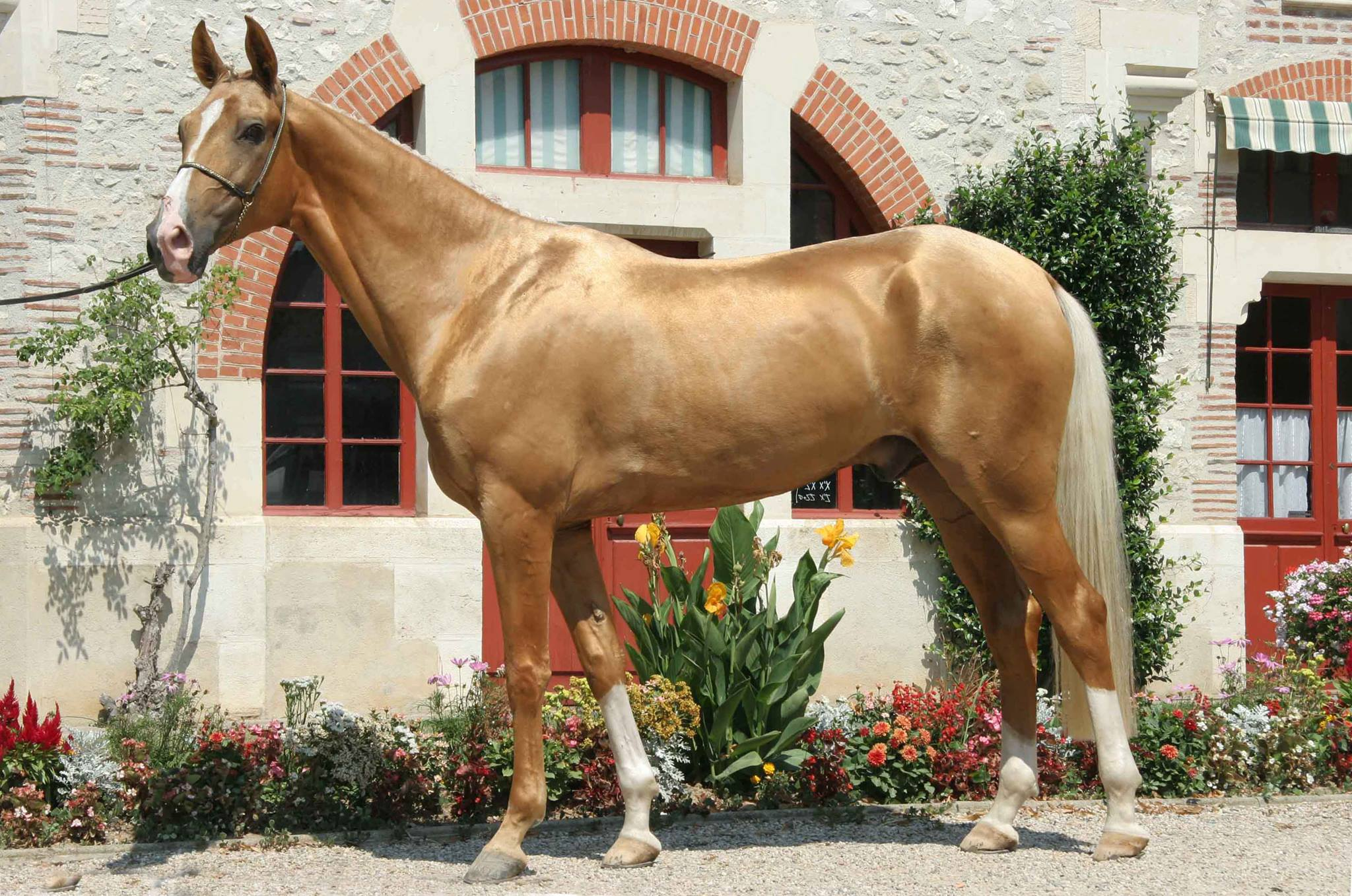
Classic palomino coloring is said to be that of a "gold coin", as shown with this horse.

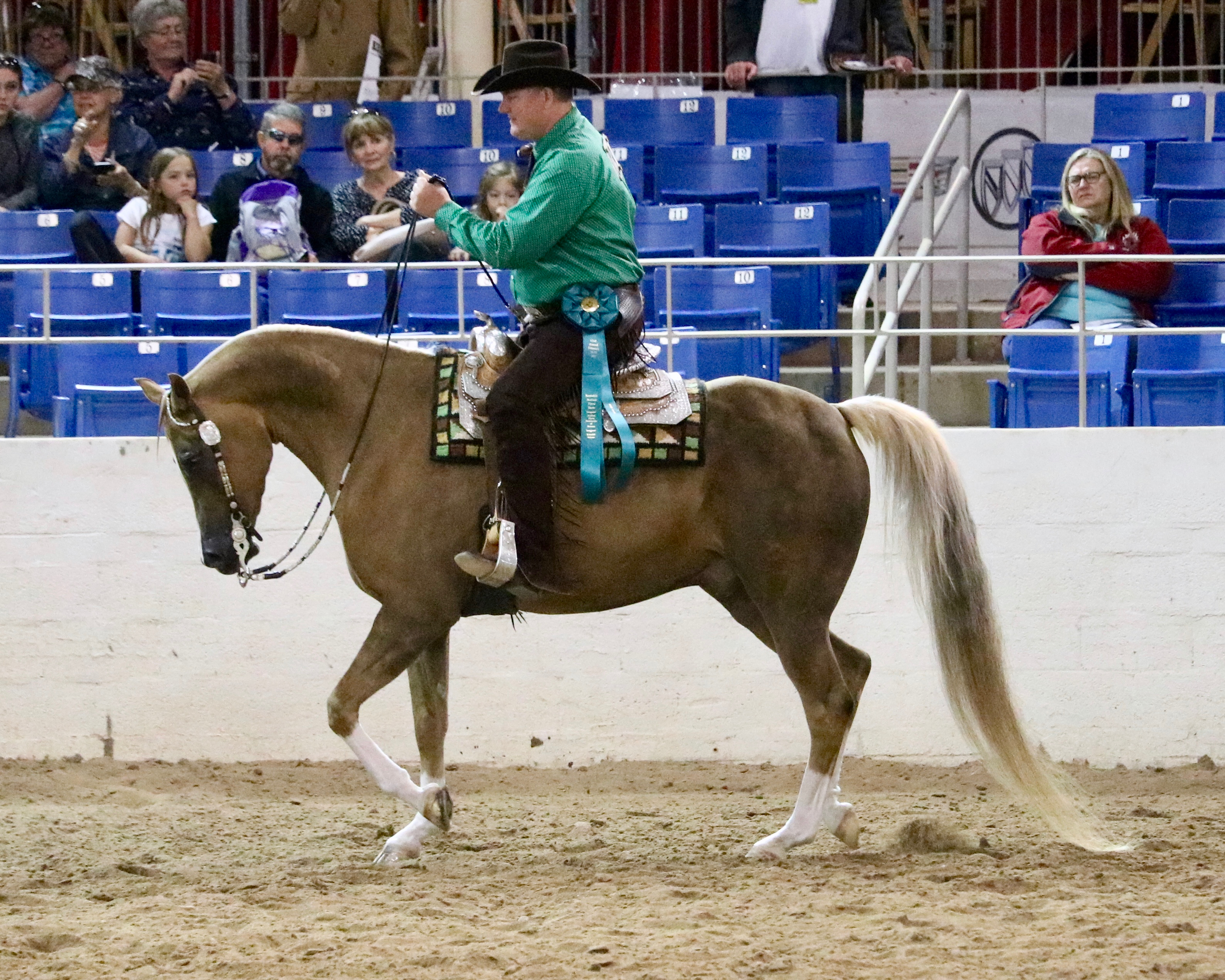
Darker gold palomino horses may appear sooty.

Palomino horses have a yellow or gold coat, with a white or light cream mane and tail. The shades of the body coat color range from cream to a dark gold.

Unless also affected by other, unrelated genes, palominos have dark skin and brown eyes, though some may be born with pinkish skin that darkens with age. Some have slightly lighter brown or amber eyes. A heterozygous cream dilute (CR) such as the palomino must not be confused with a horse carrying champagne dilution. Champagne (CH) dilutes are born with pumpkin-pink skin and blue eyes, which darken within days to amber, green or light brown, and their skin acquires a darker mottled complexion around the eyes, muzzle, and genitalia as the animal matures.

A horse with rosy-pink skin and blue eyes in adulthood is most often a cremello or a perlino, a horse carrying two cream dilution genes.

Sooty palomino horses may have darker hairs in the mane, tail and coat. The summer coat of a palomino is usually a slightly darker shade than the winter coat.

== Colors confused with palomino ==
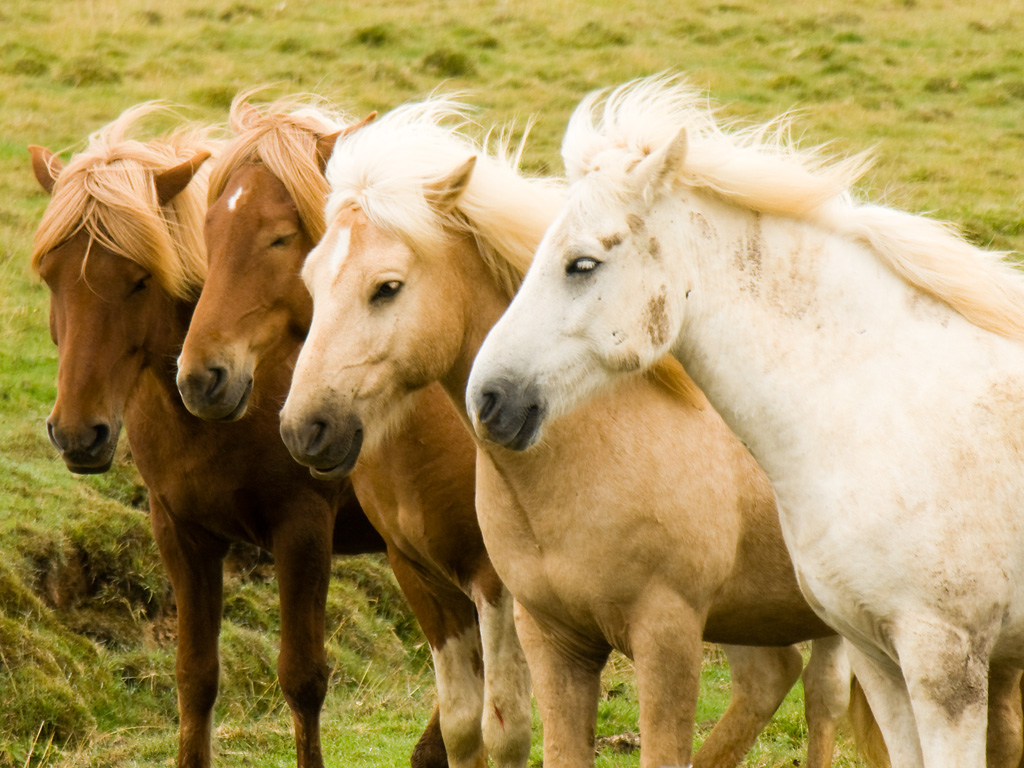
Image indicating the different color breeds. Left to right: two chestnuts with flaxen manes, a palomino, and a gray

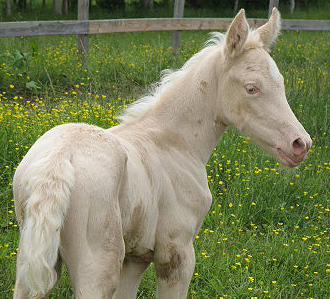
A cremello foal, showing pink skin and blue eyes characteristic of full dilution

Many non-palominos may also have a gold or tan coat and a light mane and tail.

- Chestnut with flaxen mane and tail: Lighter chestnuts with a light cream mane and tail carry a flaxen gene, but not a cream dilution. For example, the Haflinger breed has many light chestnuts with flaxen that may superficially resemble dark palomino, but there is no cream gene in the breed.
- Cremellos carry two copies of the cream gene and have a light mane and tail but also a cream-colored hair coat, rosy pink skin and blue eyes.
- The champagne gene is the most similar palomino mimic, as it creates a golden-colored coat on some horses, but golden champagnes have light skin with mottling, blue eyes at birth, and amber or hazel eyes in adulthood.
- Horses with a very dark brown coat but a flaxen mane and tail are sometimes called "chocolate palomino", and some palomino color registries accept horses of such color. However, this coloring is not genetically palomino. There are two primary ways the color is created. The best-known is a liver chestnut with a flaxen mane and tail. The genetics that create light flaxen manes and tails on otherwise chestnut horses are not yet fully understood, but they are not the same as the cream dilution. The other genetic mechanism is derived from the silver dapple gene, which lightens a black coat to dark brown, and affects the mane and tail even more strongly, diluting to cream or near-white.
- Buckskins have a golden body coat but a black mane and tail. Buckskin is also created by the action of a single cream gene, but on a bay coat.
- Dun horses have a tan body with a darker mane and tail plus primitive markings such as a dorsal stripe down the spine and horizontal striping on the upper back of the forearm.
- The pearl gene in a homozygous state creates a somewhat apricot-colored coat with pale skin. When crossed with a single cream gene, the resulting horse, often called a "pseudo-double-dilute", appears visually to be a cremello.

== Color breed registries ==
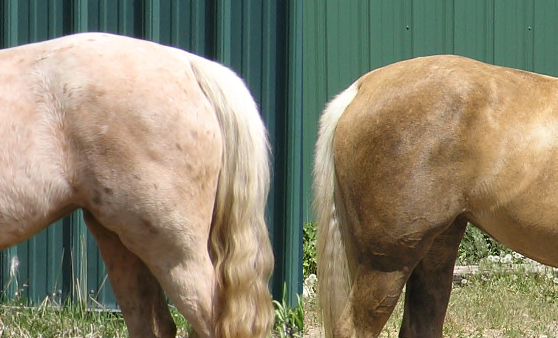
Image showing the variation between winter and summer coat color on the same palomino horse.

In the United States, some palomino horses are classified as a color breed. However, unlike the Appaloosa or the Friesian, which are distinct breeds that also happen to have a unique color preference, Palomino color breed registries often accept a wide range of breed or type if the animals are properly golden-colored. The Palomino cannot be a true horse breed, however, because palomino color is an incomplete dominant gene and does not breed "true". A palomino crossed with a palomino may result in a palomino about 50% of the time, but could also produce a chestnut (25% probability) or a cremello (25% probability). Thus, palomino is simply a partially expressed color allele and not a set of characteristics that make up a "breed".

Because registration as a palomino with a color breed registry is based primarily on coat color, horses from many breeds or combinations of breeds may qualify. Some breeds that have palomino representatives are the American Saddlebred, Tennessee Walking Horse, Morgan and Quarter Horse. The color is fairly rare in the Thoroughbred, but does in fact occur and is recognized by The Jockey Club. Some breeds, such as the Haflinger and Arabian, may appear to be palomino, but are genetically chestnuts with flaxen manes and tails, as neither breed carries the cream dilution gene. However, in spite of their lack of cream DNA, some palomino color registries have registered such horses if their coat color falls within the acceptable range of shades.

While the color standard used by palomino organizations usually describes the ideal body color as that of a "newly minted gold coin" (sometimes mistakenly claimed to be a penny), a wider a body color range is often accepted, ranging from a cream-white color to a deep, dark, chocolate color ("chocolate palomino") that may actually be silver dapple or liver chestnut with a flaxen mane and tail.

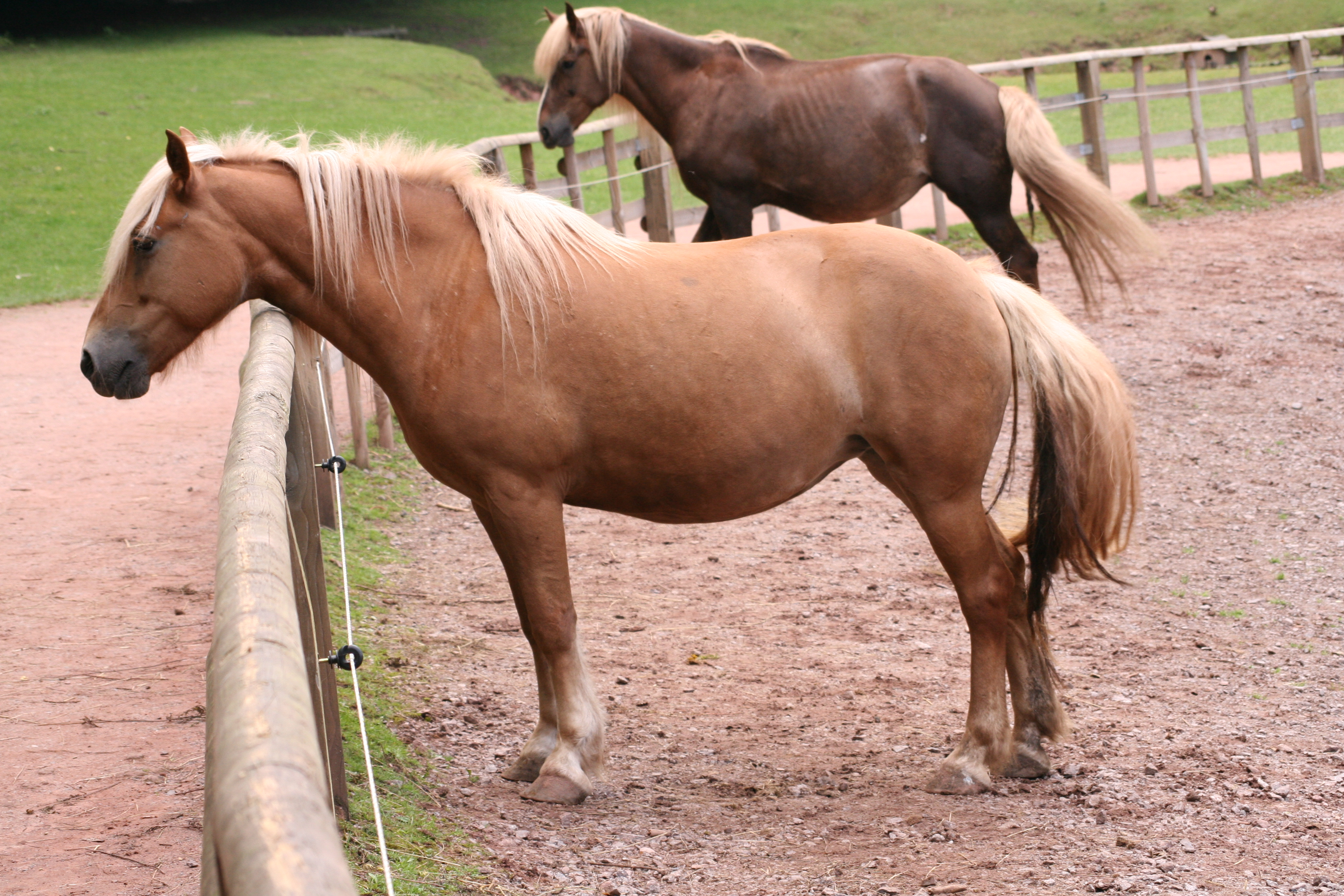
Two possible palomino mimics. The horse in front is most likely a chestnut with flaxen. The horse in the background looks like a liver chestnut with a flaxen mane and tail, but coloring could possibly be due to the silver dapple gene. Some color registries may accept both shades as "palomino".

=== Requirements for registration ===
In the United States, there are two primary color breed registries for Palomino-colored horses: the Palomino Horse Association (PHA), and the Palomino Horse Breeders of America (PHBA).

The Palomino Horse Association (PHA) registers palomino horses of any breed and type "on color and conformation". The shade of color considered ideal by the PHA is the color of a gold coin, but shades of palomino from light to dark gold are accepted. The mane and tail are required to be white, silver, or ivory, but up to 15% dark or reddish-brown hair is accepted. In the interest of breeding palomino horses, the PHA also registers full double-dilute blue-eyed cremellos, erroneously called "cremello palominos" by the PHA. Horses that are not recorded by any other registry of unknown pedigree are accepted if their color meets the PHA definition of "palomino".

The Palomino Horse Breeders of America (PHBA) has stricter requirements. To be accepted by the PHBA, in addition to color, a horse must have the general structure appropriate to the breeds of light riding type recognized by the PHBA. The adult height of the PHBA horse should be 14 to 17 hands (56 to 68 inches, 142 to 173 cm), and the horse must not show draft horse or pony characteristics. An individual that does not meet the height requirements may still be accepted if it is registered in one of the breed registries recognized by the PHBA. The PHBA usually requires horses or both parents of the horse to be registered by or eligible for registration with certain recognized breed registries, including those for the American Quarter Horse, Paint, Appaloosa, Saddlebred, Morgan, Holsteiner, Arabian, assorted part-Arabian registries, Pinto (horse division only), Thoroughbred, and assorted gaited horse breeds. Horses with PHBA-registered parents are also eligible even if they are not recorded with any other breed registry. In some situations, mares and geldings may be registered without pedigree on account of their conformation and color only, but stallions must always have pedigrees that are "verified in fact".

The ideal PHBA body color is the shade of "a United States gold coin". The mane and tail must be naturally white, and may not have more than 15% black, brown or off-colored hairs. Brown or dark primitive markings are not accepted. PHBA also does not accept horses that are gray or show color characteristics of Paints, pintos, Appaloosas or cremellos or perlinos. The skin must be dark, other than pink skin on the face connected to a white marking. The PHBA will not accept a horse for regular registration if it has all three characteristics of a double-dilute cream: light (or pink) skin over the body; white or cream-colored hair over the body; and eyes of a bluish cast. White markings on the face and legs may not exceed certain limits. Leg white may not be higher than the level of the elbow or the stifle, white on the face may not extend past the throatlatch. Spotting and characteristics of the Leopard complex and the various pinto patterns are not accepted, and body spots of less than a 4-inch diameter may be allowed. Horses with non-dark skin on the body, white or creamy coat and pink skin around the eyes are not accepted. Spots of pink skin visible in the muzzle or around the eyes, under the tail and between the hind legs are not accepted. An exception is made for horses registered with the American Saddlebred Horse Association, which may have skin of any color. Accepted eye colors are black, brown, blue and hazel. However, horses with blue or partially blue eyes are accepted only if their registration certificate from a recognized breed association mentions the eye color; they are also accepted on horses of unknown pedigree if they are gelded or spayed.

== See also ==
- Cream gene
- Dilution gene
- Equine coat color
- Equine coat color genetics
- Palomino rabbit
