= Appaloosa Horse Club =

American horse breed registry for the Appaloosa horse

The Appaloosa Horse Club, located in Moscow, Idaho, is dedicated to preserving and promoting the Appaloosa breed. The state of Idaho adopted the Appaloosa as its state horse in 1975. More than 630,000 Appaloosas have been registered with the Appaloosa Horse Club since its founding in 1938. The Appaloosa Horse Club is an international breed registry which records and preserves the breeds' heritage and history. The club is one of the top international equine breed registries, and is dedicated to preserving, promoting, and enhancing the Appaloosa breed.

== History ==
The original ApHC articles of incorporation were signed by founders Claude and Faye Thompson, Dr. Francis Haines, Ernest Kuck and Frank Dick in December 1938. The ApHC operated out of the Thompson's home in Moro, Oregon, through 1947. George Hatley of Moscow, Idaho, who joined the organization in 1942, offered in 1946 to create a newsletter for the ApHC's members. Claude Thompson recruited Hatley as assistant secretary, and Hatley published the first edition of the Appaloosa News, then a single mimeographed page.

Hatley was named executive secretary in 1947, while also a sophomore at the University of Idaho. Shortly after, the ApHC office was moved to the Hatley's Moscow home. For a time, stud fees from Hatley's Appaloosa stallion were used to help finance the ApHC. Hatley and Francis Haines began the process of publishing the ApHC's first stud book. By 1948 the ApHC had 296 registered horses, ranking ninth in annual registrations among light-horse breeds. The first official membership meeting and election of national directors occurred June 19, 1948, before the first National Show.

== Registration ==
The ApHC states that the Appaloosa is "a breed defined by ApHC bloodline requirements and preferred characteristics, including coat pattern." In other words, the ApHC considers the Appaloosa as a distinct breed from limited bloodlines with distinct physical traits and a desired color. Thus, Appaloosas are not strictly a "color breed." All ApHC-registered Appaloosas must be the offspring of two registered Appaloosa parents or a registered Appaloosa and a horse from another approved breed registry. The ApHC lists Arabian horses, Quarter Horses, and Thoroughbreds as approved breeds. In all cases, one parent must always be a regular registered Appaloosa. The only exception to the bloodline requirements is in the case of Appaloosa colored geldings or spayed mares with unknown pedigrees; owners may apply for "hardship registration" for these non-breeding horses.

== Competition programs ==
The Appaloosa Horse Club supports a variety of levels for owners to show their Appaloosas, from local open shows to the World Championship Appaloosa Show.

=== Appaloosa Competitive All-breed Activities Program ===
Appaloosa Competitive All-breed Activities Program (ACAAP) allows owners to compete with their Appaloosas in competition outside of ApHC-approved or -sponsored shows by recognizing and awarding Appaloosas for achievements in all-breed competitions in many disciplines, including barrel racing, combined training, driving, trail riding and jumping.

=== Breeders' Trust ===
The Appaloosa Breeders' Trust is an investment and incentive program offered to owners of Appaloosa stallions and their foals. For an annual fee, the stallion is enrolled and the offspring of the stallion are then eligible for nomination to the five-year incentive program. All funds (minus a five percent administrative charge) are maintained in a separate account and subsequently distributed back to the horse owners, in direct proportion to ApHC-sanctioned points earned by the foals. Breeders' Trust gives 85 percent of paid monies in 5 equal parts for five age categories: Yearlings, Two-year-olds, Three-year-olds, Four-year-olds and Five-year-olds.

=== Horse shows ===
The ApHC holds three nationally recognized horse shows every year: the National Appaloosa Show, the Youth World Championship Appaloosa Show and the World Championship Appaloosa Show. The National Appaloosa Show began in 1948 and was held in Lewiston, Idaho, and was moved across the country until a 15-year stay in Oklahoma City, Oklahoma, beginning in 1993. In 2008 the show was moved to Jackson, Mississippi. The National Appaloosa Show and the Youth World Championship Appaloosa Show has been located at the Will Rogers Equestrian Center in Fort Worth, Texas, since 2013. ApHC signed a three-year contract that concluded that the two shows will be moved to Indianapolis starting in 2021.

== Appaloosa racing ==
The Nez Perce raced their Appaloosa horses at distances from a few hundred yards to twelve miles (19 km). Continuing the tradition, the ApHC offered races at the National Show in 1948 and for the first few years of the World Show. Appaloosas are now mid-distance runners, competing at 220 yards (200 m) to eight furlongs (one mile, 1.6 km). The Missouri Appaloosa Association, an early regional club, hosted the breed's first-ever futurity at the Missouri State Fair in 1960, and in December of that year, the ApHC Board of Directors passed a resolution creating the Racing Committee of the ApHC. The first ApHC state racing association was formed in 1961: the Kansas Appaloosa Racing Association. By 1976, the ApHC recognized 24 state and regional racing associations.

The first pari-mutuel race for Appaloosas was held in 1962 at Albuquerque, New Mexico; that same year the Texas Appaloosa Horse Club and Gillespie County Fair Association held its first race meet for Appaloosas in Texas at Fredericksburg. In 1963, the first World Wide Derby was run at Albuquerque; the World Wide Futurity holds the record for the highest Appaloosa purse at $160,593, offered in 1980. The ApHC began its race medallion award system in 1973, awarding 27 medallions to Appaloosa racehorses.

Appaloosa races are now held in ten states, with Oklahoma, California, and Idaho topping the list. In 1994, the National Color Breed Racing Council formed to promote Appaloosa and Paint racing as a joint venture.

Appaloosa racehorses can earn various awards from the ApHC, including a Racing Register of Merit, year-end awards, medallions, and regional awards. The ApHC also records world and track records for Appaloosa racehorses. The Appaloosa Race Hall of Fame was formed in 1988, inducting eight racehorses and eight influential horsemen. Nominations are submitted by ApHC members and voted on by the Executive Race Committee. Horses must be deceased prior to eligibility for induction.
