= Color breed =

Groupings of horses whose registration is based primarily on their coat color

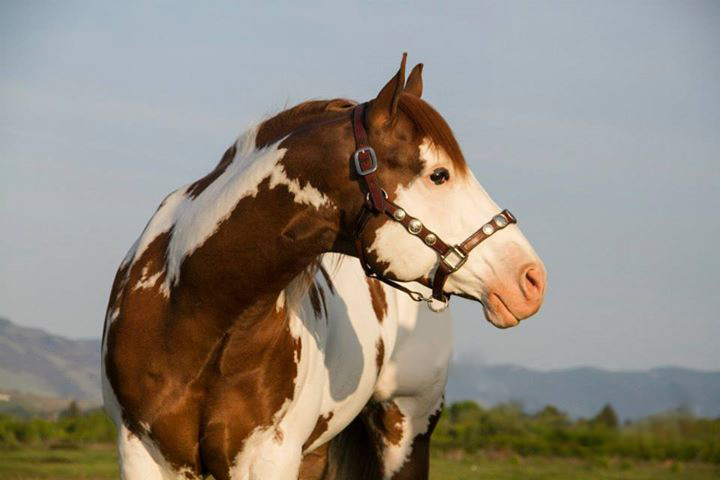
2009 liver chestnut APHA/AQHA Stallion owned by Blake Jamison

A color breed refers to groupings of horses whose registration is based primarily on their coat color, regardless of the horse's actual breed or breed type.

Some color breeds only register horses with a desired coat color if they also meet specific pedigree criteria, others register animals based solely on color, regardless of parentage. A few pedigree-based color breeds, notably the American Paint Horse and the Appaloosa, confronted with the reality of many animals born without the proper color even though they are from two registered parents, have modified their rules to allow registration of animals with the proper pedigree even if they do not possess the proper color. On the other hand, with the prevalence of DNA testing for parentage, many horses once forced into color breed status due to being born the "wrong" color and thus deemed undesirable or of questionable parentage by many regular breed registries with cropout rules can now be accepted for registration.

For example, some mainstream breeds, such as American Quarter Horses, Tennessee Walking Horses and American Saddlebreds include individuals of the palomino color or pinto patterns, as well as a wide variety of other colors. However, a color breed registry, such as the Palomino Horse Breeders Association or the Pinto Horse Association of America, accepts only horses of each particular color or color pattern —regardless of their particular breeds. White horses had their own color registry that included cremello horses, but not grays.

Many horses eligible for registration with their own breed registry and of a particular color to allow color breed registration are often "double registered" with both organizations, often increasing their sale value by doing so. With stallions, double registration may also increase their breeding value by widening the set of interested mare owners.

== Alternative meaning ==
There are some breeds, such as the Norwegian Fjord Horse, Appaloosa, American Paint Horse, Friesian and Haflinger, which have distinct physical characteristics and recorded pedigrees but also typically have distinctive or colorful coats. These might be considered a "color breed" by some, but they are pedigree-based breeds. For example, Appaloosas are usually spotted, but a solid-colored offspring of registered parents can still be a registered Appaloosa. Likewise, a solid-colored American Paint Horse that has registered parents may also be registered.

On the other hand, while Friesian breeders have deliberately bred to exclude chestnut horses, and will only register black animals, these black animals also must be Friesian by pedigree and no other bloodlines are allowed into the registry. The same is true of Norwegian Fjord Horses, which are all a variation of dun.

== Color breeding ==
Some horse breeds exclude certain colors that are considered signs of a crossbred animal. For example, other than the Sabino pattern and some recently discovered dominant white alleles in horses with DNA-verified parentage, the Arabian horse registry excludes all spotted horses. The Finnhorse was also bred for decades to exclude all colors but chestnut, and specifically to remove such "fancy" colors as roans, grays and spotted (sabino), which were seen as indicators of foreign blood, though that policy has now changed, as for some particular colors, this might hold true - for example, all present gray Finnhorses can be traced back to a certain gray mare of dubious pedigree.

Due to DNA verification of parentage, today many mainstream breed registries that once excluded certain coat colors will now accept them as long as the animal can be proved pureblooded. Many colors are specifically bred for.

== See also ==
- List of horse breeds
- Equine coat color
- Equine coat color genetics
