= Spanish Jennet Horse =

American breed of horse

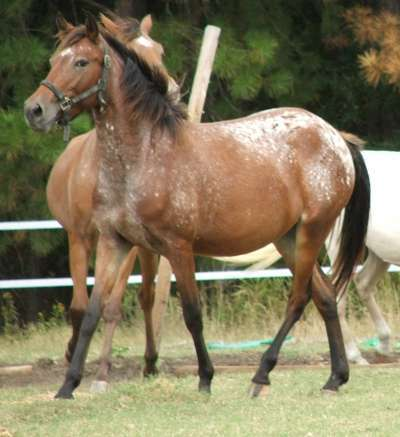
- Spanish Jennet Mare, Atigrado pattern
- Country of origin: United States

Traits
- Distinguishing features: Paso Gaited Horse of Pinto or Appaloosa Pattern, 14hh - 15.2hh, Energetic, but docile temperament

Breed standards
- Spanish Jennet Horse Society

The Spanish Jennet Horse is a modern American horse breed. It is gaited, with either pinto or leopard spotting; its conformation supposedly resembles that of the historical Spanish Jennet, a riding horse of Renaissance Europe, now absorbed into the Pura Raza Española.

== History ==
The Jennet of Renaissance Spain was a type of riding horse characterised by an ambling gait. It is extinct, and was, at least in part, absorbed into what is now the Pura Raza Española.

The Spanish Jennet Horse is a new breed of Jennet type created through the efforts of the Spanish Jennet Horse Society. The Registry requires that horse for the Pintado division be of full Paso Fino heritage and the Atigrado division must be at least of 50% Paso blood.

Outcrosses are allowed in the first generation to obtain the LP for the Registered Atigrado Spanish Jennet and must result in a minimum of 50% purebred Paso Fino or Peruvian Paso horse. Only one outcross is allowed (to obtain Lp or Appaloosa pattern). All 50% crosses will provide video proof of gait before registration of their offspring.

== Characteristics ==
The Spanish Jennet Horse is a well-proportioned animal of moderate height and build. Extremes in muscling or bone are considered faults. The optimum appearance is that of refinement with a deep chest, well sprung ribs and a strong, medium length back with broad, well muscled loins.
