= Jennet =

Extinct medieval horse breed

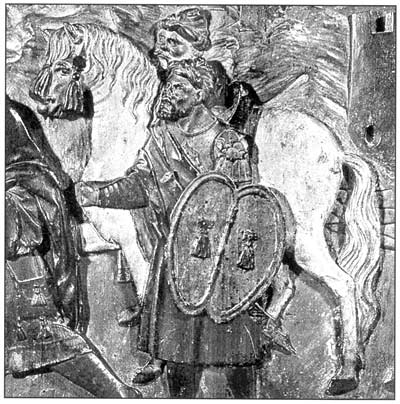
A medieval jennet.

A jennet or Spanish jennet was a small Spanish horse. It was noted for a smooth naturally ambling gait, compact and well-muscled build, and a good disposition. The jennet was an ideal light riding horse, and as such spread across Europe and provided some of the foundation bloodstock for several horse breeds in the Americas.

== Etymology ==
According to the 1911 Encyclopædia Britannica, "jennet" referred to a small Spanish horse. The 2000 edition of the American Heritage Dictionary also defines "jennet", with the alternative spelling genet, as a small Spanish saddle horse. The "jennet" described a type, rather than a breed of horse, and thus is not used today; the term was in regular use during the Middle Ages to refer to a specific type of horse, usually one of Iberian or Barb extraction, often gaited.

In the etymology provided by the 1911 Encyclopædia Britannica, "jennet" is derived from the French genet, from Spanish jinete, a light horseman who rides à la jineta, explained as "with his legs tucked up." This referred to their style of riding with shorter stirrups, which they preferred for closer collection of the horse. The term is taken to be a corruption of Zenata, a Berber tribe famed for its cavalry. Felipe Maíllo Salgado has linked the medieval terms jinete and jineta to the history of Spanish cavalry and their lexical development. In English and French, the word came to refer to the horse rather than the style of riding. In Spanish, that meaning has developed in modern times. The American Heritage Dictionary's etymology is similar, citing the Middle English genet, from Old French; from the Catalan ginet, of Arabic and, ultimately, of Berber origin.

== Modern descendants and recreated breeds ==
The modern Spanish Jennet Horse, Paso Fino and Peruvian Paso breeds probably most closely resemble the original jennet. In the treatise Il Cavallarizzo written by Claudio Corte in 1562, three years after the end of the Great Italian Wars, the author describes at length the qualities of the ginecti (jennets) as horses useful for war.

According to Corte, the jennets were one of the most commonly used horses by the Spanish light cavalry. Spanish heavy cavalry used a different breed which Corte refers to as "Villanos". However, there is no mention of the Andalusian as a war horse in Corte's book, indicating that that breed either did not exist or was not used for war during the rise of Spain as a major European Power in 1494–1562. The castle of Venafro in the Italian region of Molise (which was under Spanish rule in the 1500s) has numerous frescos portraying the ginecti (jennets), which seem to closely resemble a modern-day Criollo horse or a Peruvian Paso

== See also ==
- Horses in the Middle Ages
- Spanish Jennet Horse (modern breed)
