= Horse breed =

Selectively bred populations of domesticated horses

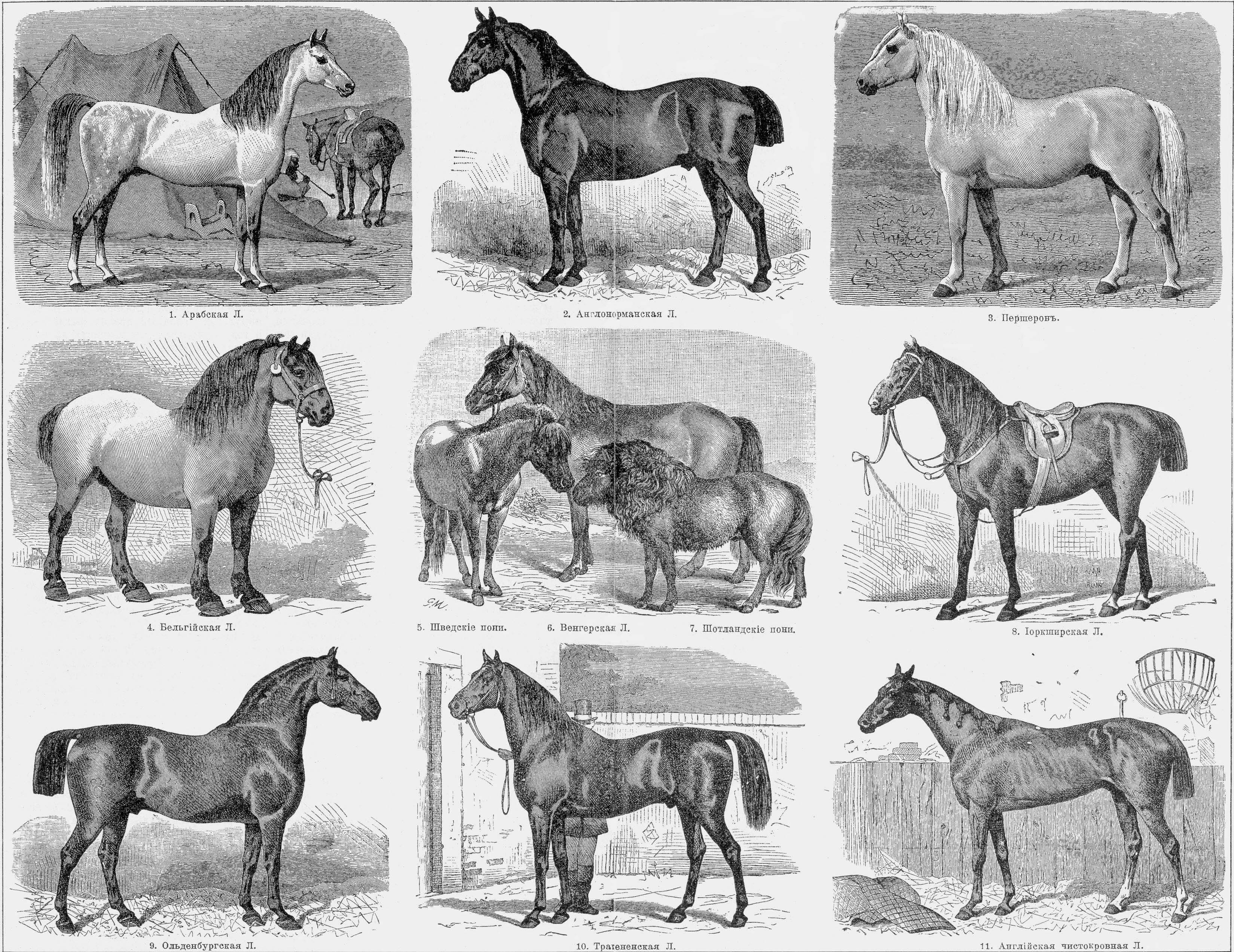
Illustration of horse breeds from Brockhaus and Efron Encyclopedic Dictionary (1890–1907)

A horse breed is a selectively bred population of domesticated horses, often with pedigrees recorded in a breed registry. However, the term is sometimes used in a broader sense to define landrace animals of a common phenotype located within a limited geographic region, or even feral "breeds" that are naturally selected. Depending on definition, hundreds of "breeds" exist today, developed for many different uses. Horse breeds are loosely divided into three categories based on general temperament: spirited "hot bloods" with speed and endurance; "cold bloods," such as draft horses and some ponies, suitable for slow, heavy work; and "warmbloods," developed from crosses between hot bloods and cold bloods, often focusing on creating breeds for specific riding purposes, particularly in Europe.

Horse breeds are groups of horses with distinctive characteristics that are transmitted consistently to their offspring, such as conformation, color, performance ability, or disposition. These inherited traits are usually the result of a combination of natural crosses and artificial selection methods aimed at producing horses for specific tasks. Certain breeds are known for certain talents. For example, Standardbreds are known for their speed in harness racing. Some breeds have been developed through centuries of crossings with other breeds, while others, such as the Morgan horse, originated from a single sire from which all current breed members descend. More than 300 horse breeds exist in the world today.

== Origin of breeds ==
Modern horse breeds developed in response to a need for "form to function", the necessity to develop certain physical characteristics to perform a certain type of work. Thus, powerful but refined breeds such as the Andalusian or the Lusitano developed in the Iberian Peninsula as riding horses that also had a great aptitude for dressage, while heavy draft horses such as the Clydesdale and the Shire developed out of a need to perform demanding farm work and pull heavy wagons. Ponies of all breeds originally developed mainly from the need for a working animal that could fulfill specific local draft and transportation needs while surviving in harsh environments. However, by the 20th century, many pony breeds had Arabian and other blood added to make a more refined pony suitable for riding. Other horse breeds developed specifically for light agricultural work, heavy and light carriage and road work, various equestrian disciplines, or simply as pets.

== Purebreds and registries ==
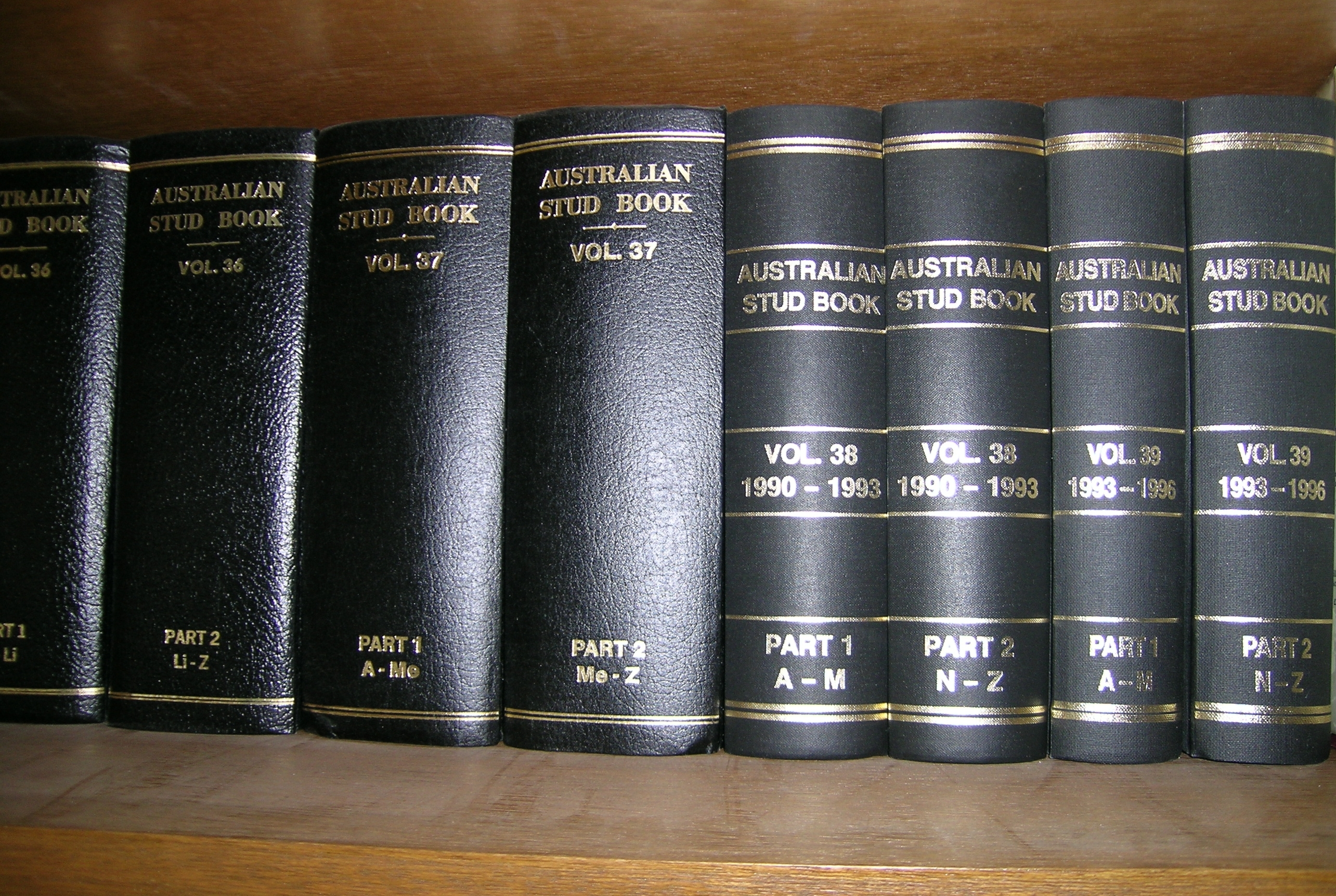
Australian Stud Books from the 1990s

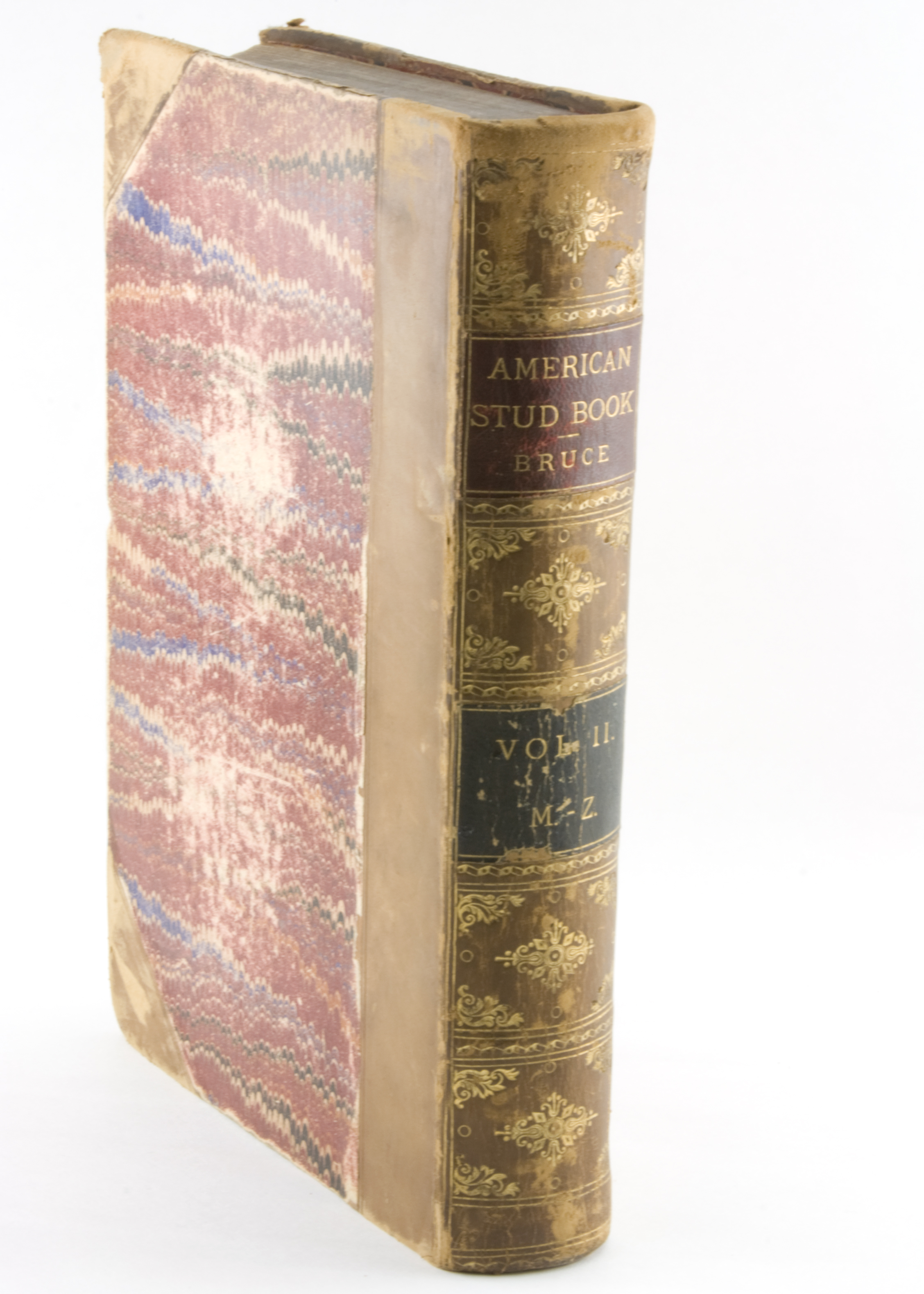
One volume of the 1873 American Stud Book

Horses have been selectively bred since their domestication. However, the concept of purebred bloodstock and a controlled, written breed registry only became of significant importance in modern times. Today, the standards for defining and registration of different breeds vary. Sometimes, purebred horses are called "Thoroughbreds", which is incorrect; "Thoroughbred" is a specific breed of horse, while a "purebred" is a horse (or any other animal) with a defined pedigree recognized by a breed registry.

An early example of people who practiced selective horse breeding were the Bedouin, who had a reputation for careful breeding practices, keeping extensive pedigrees of their Arabian horses and placing great value upon pure bloodlines. Though these pedigrees were originally transmitted by an oral tradition, written pedigrees of Arabian horses can be found that date to the 14th century. In the same period of the early Renaissance, the Carthusian monks of southern Spain bred horses and kept meticulous pedigrees of the best bloodstock; the lineage survives to this day in the Andalusian horse. One of the earliest formal registries was General Stud Book for Thoroughbreds, which began in 1791 and traced back to the Arabian stallions imported to England from the Middle East that became the foundation stallions for the breed.

Some breed registries have a closed stud book, where registration is based on pedigree, and no outside animals can gain admittance. For example, a registered Thoroughbred or Arabian must have two registered parents of the same breed.

Other breeds have a partially closed stud book, but still allow certain infusions from other breeds. For example, the modern Appaloosa must have at least one Appaloosa parent, but may also have a Quarter Horse, Thoroughbred, or Arabian parent, so long as the offspring exhibits appropriate color characteristics. The Quarter Horse normally requires both parents to be registered Quarter Horses, but allows "Appendix" registration of horses with one Thoroughbred parent, and the horse may earn its way to full registration by completing certain performance requirements.

Open stud books exist for horse breeds that either have not yet developed a rigorously defined standard phenotype, or for breeds that register animals that conform to an ideal via the process of passing a studbook selection process. Most of the warmblood breeds used in sport horse disciplines have open stud books to varying degrees. While pedigree is considered, outside bloodlines are admitted to the registry if the horses meet the set standard for the registry. These registries usually require a selection process involving judging of an individual animal's quality, performance, and conformation before registration is finalized. A few "registries," particularly some color breed registries, are very open and will allow membership of all horses that meet limited criteria, such as coat color and species, regardless of pedigree or conformation.

Breed registries also differ as to their acceptance or rejection of breeding technology. For example, all Jockey Club Thoroughbred registries require that a registered Thoroughbred be a product of a natural mating, so-called "live cover". A foal born of two Thoroughbred parents, but by means of artificial insemination or embryo transfer, cannot be registered in the Thoroughbred studbook. However, since the advent of DNA testing to verify parentage, most breed registries now allow artificial insemination, embryo transfer, or both. The high value of stallions has helped with the acceptance of these techniques because they allow a stallion to breed more mares with each "collection" and greatly reduce the risk of injury during mating. Cloning of horses is highly controversial, and at the present time most mainstream breed registries will not accept cloned horses, though several cloned horses and mules have been produced. Such restrictions have led to legal challenges in the United States, sometime based on state law and sometimes based on antitrust laws.

== Hybrids ==
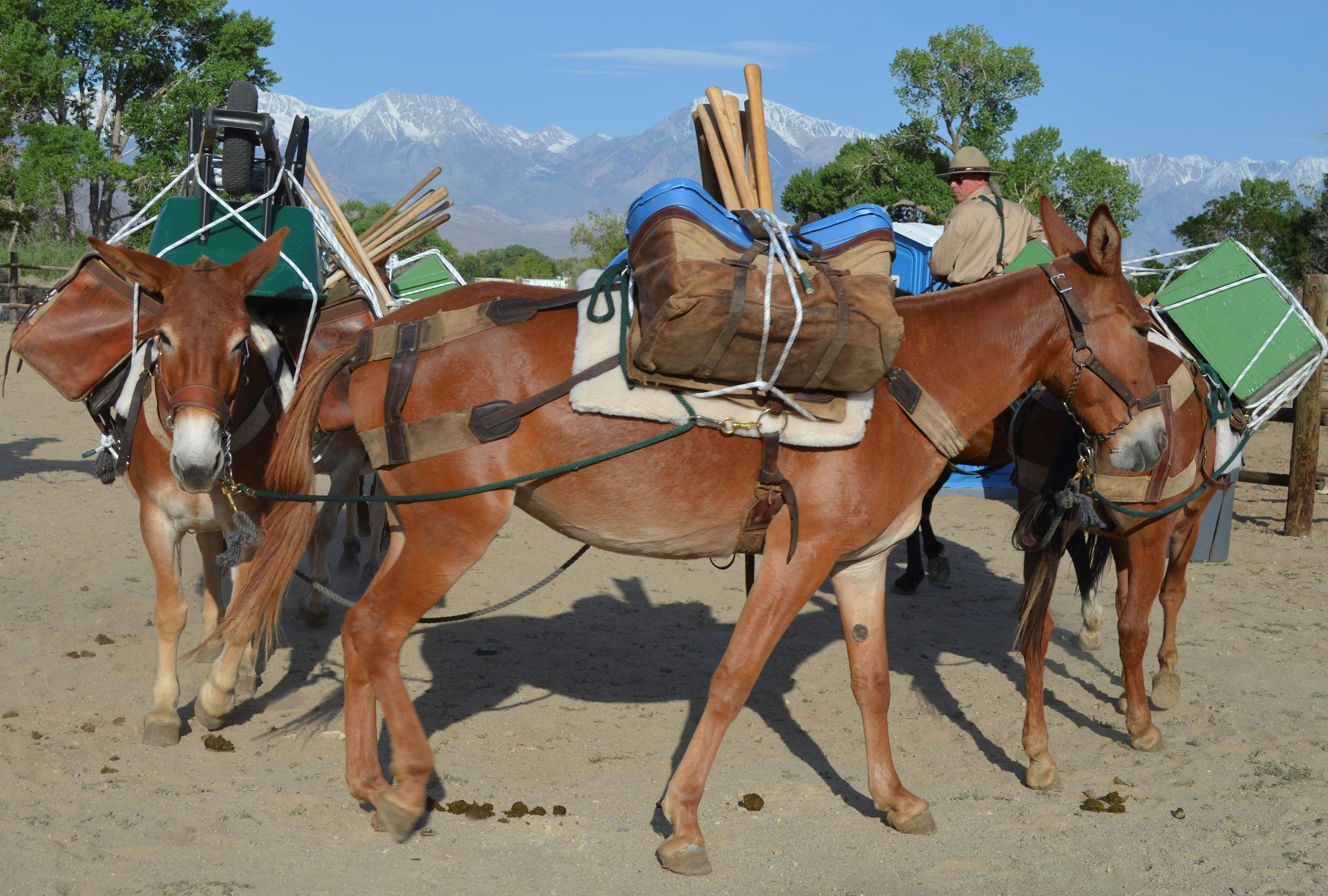
Mules with pack saddles during a demonstration (2014)

Horses can crossbreed with other equine species to produce hybrids. These hybrid types are not breeds, but they resemble breeds in that crosses between certain horse breeds and other equine species produce characteristic offspring. The most common hybrid is the mule, a cross between a "jack" (male donkey) and a mare. A related hybrid, the hinny, is a cross between a stallion and a jenny (female donkey). Most other hybrids involve the zebra (see Zebroid). With rare exceptions, most equine hybrids are sterile and cannot reproduce. A notable exception is hybrid crosses between horses and Equus ferus przewalskii, commonly known as Przewalski's horse.

== See also ==
- List of horse breeds
- Selective breeding
- Horse breeding
