= Semirechensk =

Kazakh breed of pig

- Conservation status: FAO (2007): not at risk
- Other names: Kazakh: Жетісу шошқасы, Jetisw şoşqası; Russian: Ceмиpeчeнcкaя, Semirechenskaya; Kazakh Hybrid Breed Group
- Country of origin: Soviet Union
- Distribution: Kazakhstan
- Use: meat

Traits
- Weight: Male: average 298 kg; Female: average 221 kg
- Hair: solid white, tan or dark brown; black pied

The Semirechensk is a Kazakh breed of domestic pig. It was purpose-bred in the twentieth century in the Kazakh Soviet Socialist Republic of the Soviet Union (now Kazakhstan). The breeding stock was principally Large White, with some admixture of Siberian Kemerovo and a small proportion of wild boar.

== History ==
The Semirechensk was the result of a programme of selective breeding conducted between 1947 and 1966 in south-eastern Kazakhstan under the auspices of the Institute of Experimental Biology of the Academy of Sciences of the Kazakh SSR. The aim was to improve the adaptation of the British Large White to the extreme climatic conditions of the area, where summer temperatures may be close to 50°C, and winter low temperatures close to -50°C. To this end, Large Whites were to a small extent inter-bred with Asiatic wild boar, and the resulting hybrids cross-bred with Kemerovo stock from southern Siberia; the final result was at least 75% Large White, with some 6–12% wild boar blood. It had similar production qualities to the Large White, but better adaptation to the climate, a higher resistance to heat, and lower susceptibility to a number of diseases.

The breed received official recognition in 1978; it was originally named the Kazakh Hybrid, kazakhskaya gibridnaya porodnaya gruppa. By 1980 the purebred stock had reached some 43000 head, with almost 6000 breeding sows and about 1200 active boars. It was reared mainly in the oblasts of Alma-Ata, Jambul, Karaganda, Shymkent and Taldy-Kurgan.

Breed numbers later dropped substantially, and in 1990 the total population was reported to be approximately 3400.
