= Anatolian Owl =

Breed of pigeon

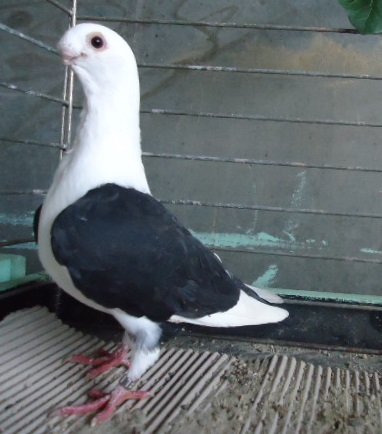
- Black Anatolian
- Conservation status: rare
- Country of origin: Turkey/Anatolia
- Distribution: limited
- Standard: yes
- Type: Show Owl
- Use: show

Traits
- Egg color: white
- Lifespan: 12 years
- Ring size: 8
- Head: round
- Marking: shield and tail marked
- Eye color: bull
- Beak: short blunt

Classification
- Australian: Not listed
- European: Owl #713
- US: Not listed

The Anatolian Owl is a pigeon breed developed in Germany from ancestral stock from Anatolia with unique head shape and pied marking.

== Origin ==
H. P. Carida, a Greek resident of England, introduced the Anatolian breeds to Europe. It is regarded as the ancestral breed for all European shield-marked Owl pigeon breeds. The Anatolian Owl was then further developed in Germany between 1700 and 1750. Max Lietze and Carl Heyne of Eberswalde were instrumental in that development of the breed.

Its very early ancestry traces to the area of Anatolia and Levant. As with all domesticated pigeons, it is derived from the Rock Dove (Columba Livia), being further developed using selective breeding techniques. Its most impressive deviations from the Rock Dove are the shape of the head and markings.

== Description ==
It is a pied pigeon, predominantly white, most having colored shields resembling seagulls. They are called Möwchen (little seagull) in their home country of Germany. Some, however, also have colored tails or both solidly colored the wing shields and tails. They are seen in a wide variety of colors including black, yellow, blue, red and dun and of course white.

The full forehead with the complementing short beak provides than unique round appearance which derives directly from the Owl breeds of Anatolia. It is well complemented with a full well developed frill (jabot) on its neck and protruding down the chest.

Up until about 1900, they were counted among the popular flying pigeons, but have since evolved into strictly ornamental show pigeons.

=== Standard Elements ===
The Anatolian Owl has been bred for centuries for its unique appearance and flight patterns. Some key characteristics that are prized by breeders include:

- Origin: Anatolia
- Group type; Owl
  - Head; As round as possible, broad with large forehead, and plain-headed.
  - Eyes; Large, bull with light-colored eye rings.
  - Beak; Short, flesh colored, blunt, and broad continuing the curve of the forehead.
  - Neck; Short and full with a well developed jabot.
  - Breast; Broad and prominent.
  - Back; Short, broad at the shoulders, sloping downwards.
  - Wings; Short, tightly held close to body and not dropping below tail
  - Tail; Short, closed.
  - Legs; Short, no feathering.
  - Markings; Tail and shield colored
- Order of Rating: Head, shape, stance, color depth

== Basic Needs ==
- Pigeon Diet
- Pigeon Housing

== Gallery ==
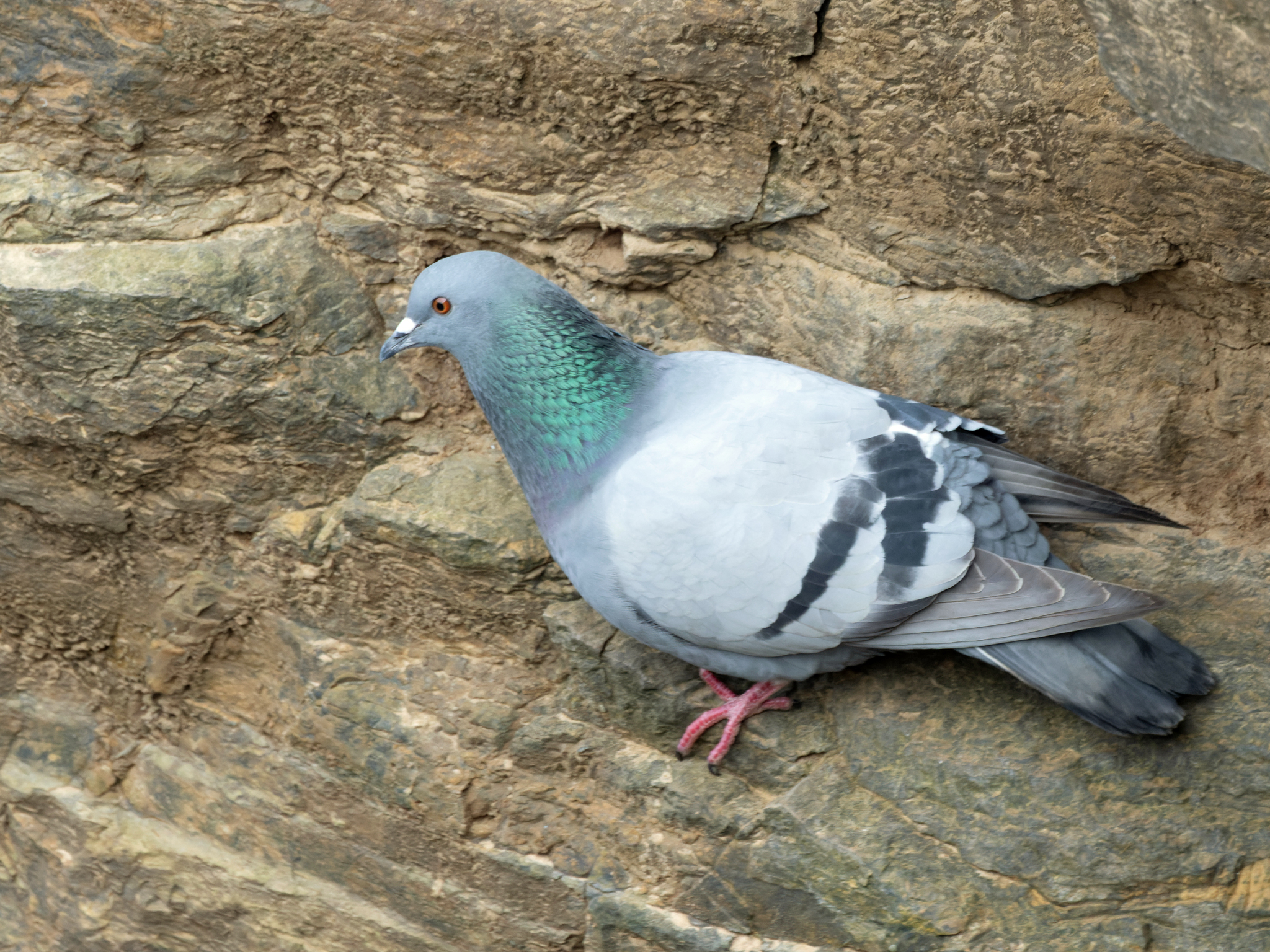
rock dove

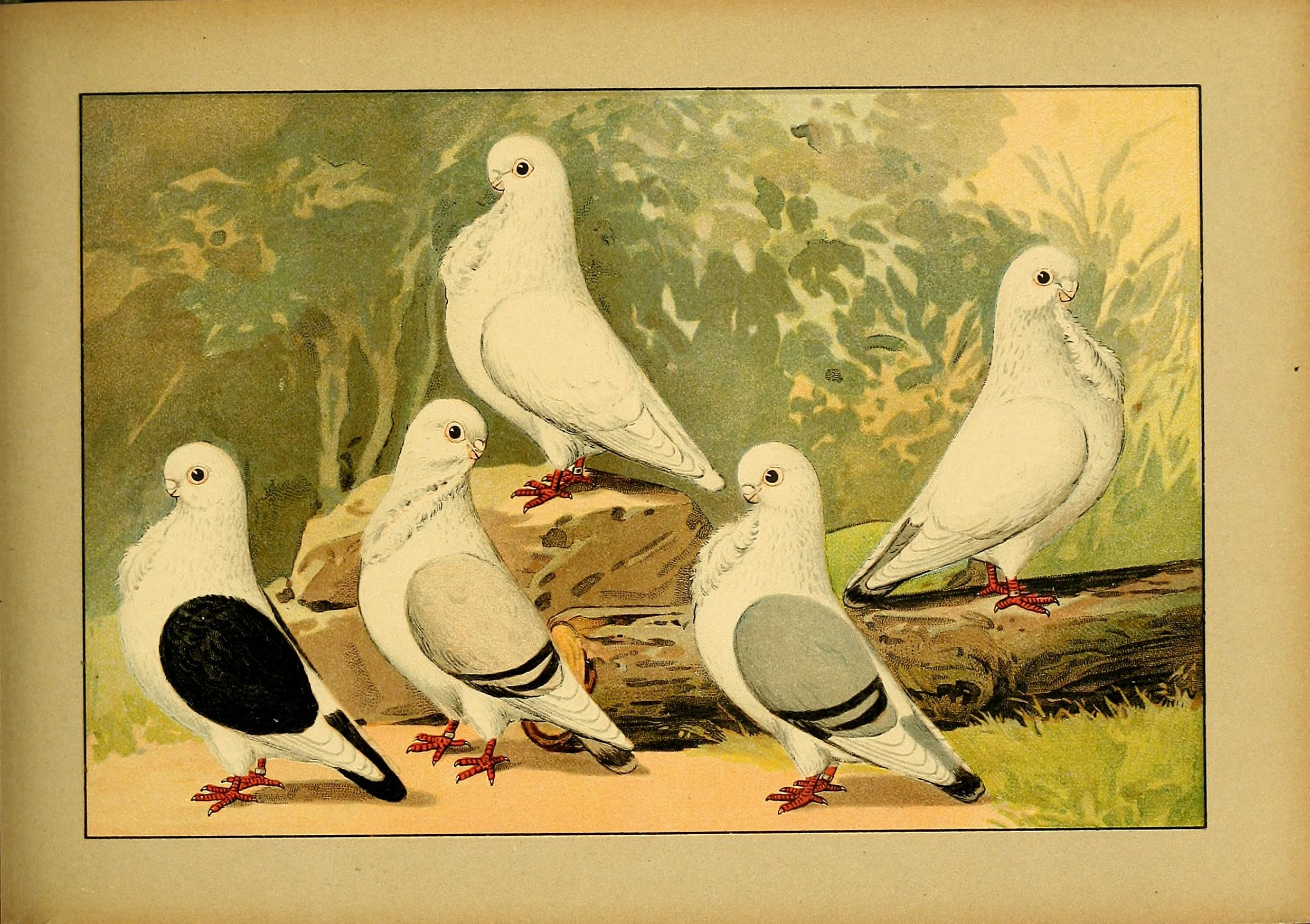
Owl image from Illustriertes Prachtwerk sämtlicher Taubenrassen

Anatolian Owl from Die Movchentuaben

== See Also ==
- List of pigeon breeds
- Pigeon keeping
