= Tricoloured horse =

Horse coat colour pattern

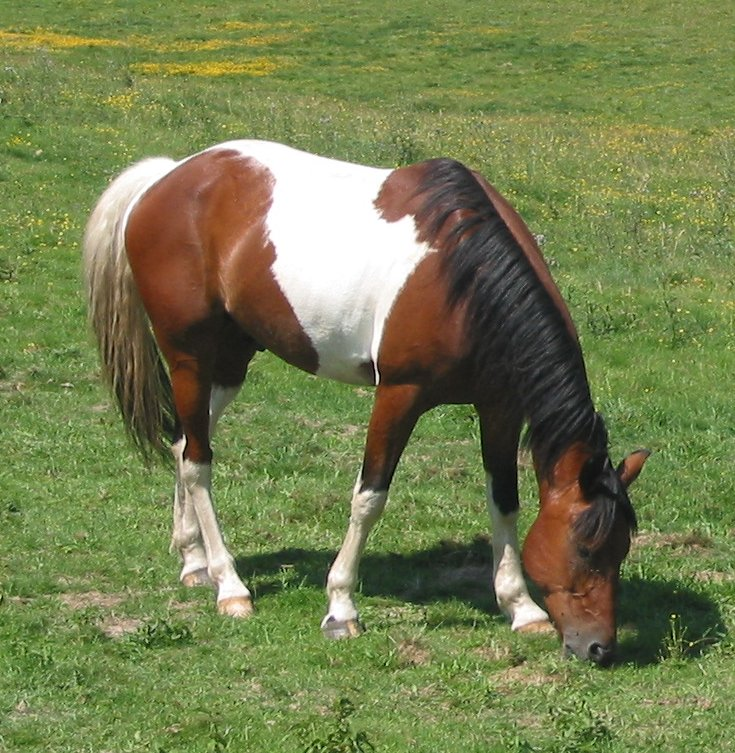
A tri-coloured horse

Tri-coloured (archaic: oddbald) refers to a horse with three different coat colours in a pinto spotting pattern of large white and dark patches, usually bay (a reddish colour with a black mane and tail) and white. This colouring is also commonly called skewbald (referring to a horse with a spotted coat that is white and any colour other than black). In modern usage in British English, skewbald and piebald (black and white) horses are collectively referred to as coloured, while in North American English, the term pinto is used to describe the colour pattern.

The colour of the horse's skin underneath its coat alternates between dark or pink, depending on the dark or white overlying hair colour. Some animals also exhibit colouration of the irises of the eye that match the surrounding skin (blue eyes for white skin, brown for dark). The underlying genetic cause is related to a condition known as leucism.

Genetically, a coloured horse begins with a solid base coat colour. Then the horse has an allele for one of three basic spotting patterns overlaying the base colour. The most common coloured spotting pattern is called tobiano, and is a dominant gene. Tobiano creates spots that are large and rounded, usually with a somewhat vertical orientation, with white that usually crosses the back of the horse, white on the legs, with the head mostly dark. Three less common spotting genes are the frame and splash overo genes, which create a mostly dark, jagged spotting with a horizontal orientation, white on the head, but dark or minimally marked legs. The sabino pattern can be very minor, usually adding white that runs up the legs onto the belly or flanks, with "lacy" or roaning at the edge of the white, plus white on the head that either extends past the eye, over the chin, or both. The genetics of overo and sabino are not yet fully understood, but and can appear in the offspring of two apparently solid-coloured parents, whereas a tobiano must always have at least one tobiano parent.

== See also ==
- Equine coat color genetics
- Piebald
- Skewbald
