= Skewbald =

Colour pattern of horses

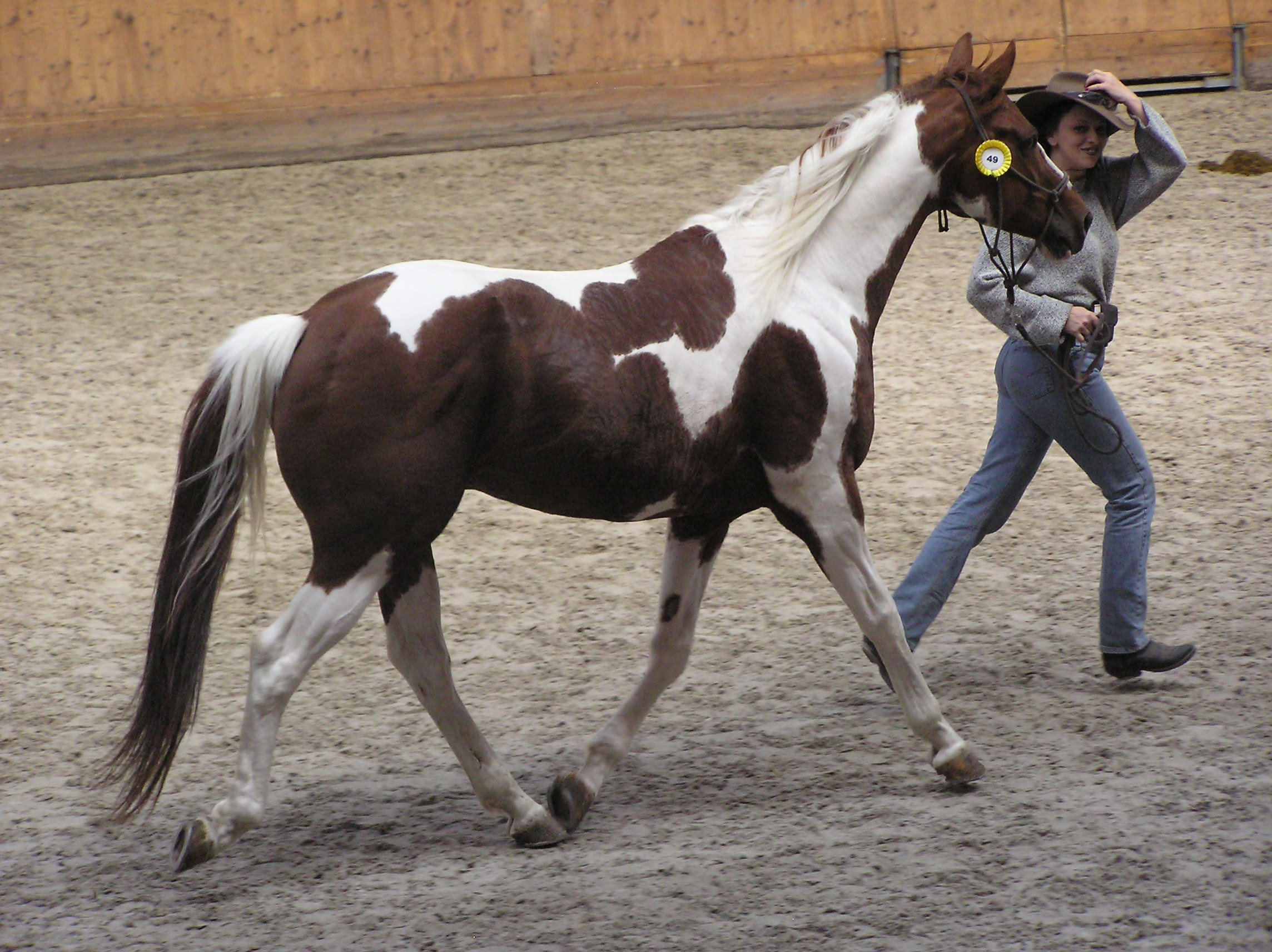
A skewbald horse, chestnut with white patches

Skewbald is a colour pattern of horses. A skewbald horse has a coat made up of white patches on a non-black base coat, such as chestnut, bay, or any colour besides black coat. Skewbald horses which are bay and white (bay is a reddish-brown colour with black mane and tail) are sometimes called tricoloured. These horses usually have pink skin under white markings and dark skin under non-white areas. Other than colour, it is similar in appearance to the piebald pattern. Some animals also exhibit colouration of the irises of the eye that match the surrounding skin (blue eyes for white skin, brown for dark). The underlying genetic cause is related to a condition known as leucism. The term is also used to describe spotting patterns in various other animals, such as goats.

== Horses ==
=== Terminology ===
In British equestrian use, skewbald and piebald (black-and-white) are together known as coloured, and the white markings are called patches. In North American equestrian usage, the term for all large-spotted colouring is pinto, and the markings are called spots, The specialized term paint refers specifically to a breed of horse with American Quarter Horse or Thoroughbred bloodlines in addition to being spotted, whereas pinto refers to a spotted horse of any breed. Americans usually describe the colouration of a pinto literally: black-and-white, chestnut-and-white, or bay-and-white.

=== Genetics ===
Genetically, a skewbald horse begins most commonly with a chestnut base coat colour (called "red" by geneticists), or some other set of colour genes other than black. Then the horse has an allele for one of three basic spotting patterns overlaying the base colour. The most common coloured spotting pattern is called tobiano, and is a dominant gene. Tobiano creates spots that are large and rounded, usually with a somewhat vertical orientation, with white that usually crosses the back of the horse, white on the legs, with the head mostly dark. Three less common spotting genes are the frame and splash overo genes, which create a mostly dark, jagged spotting with a horizontal orientation, white on the head, but dark or minimally marked legs. The sabino pattern can be very minimal, usually adding white that runs up the legs onto the belly or flanks, "lacy" or roaning at the edge of the white, plus white on the head that either extends past the eye, over the chin, or both. The genetics of overo and sabino are not yet fully understood, but they can appear in the offspring of two solid-coloured parents, whereas a tobiano must always have at least one tobiano parent.

== Other animals ==
The term is also applied sometimes to goats and dogs, among other animals. Both piebald and skewbald are used in dog and goat breeding.

== See also ==
- American Paint Horse
- Equine coat color genetics
- Piebald
- Pinto horse
- Tricoloured (horse)
