= Kemerovo pig =

Russian breed of pig

Kemerovo
- Conservation status: FAO (2007): not at risk; DAD-IS (2026): unknown
- Other names: Russian: Keмepoвcкaя; Kemerovskaya
- Country of origin: Russian Federation

Traits

The Kemerovo (Russian: Keмepoвcкaя, Kemerovskaya) is a Russian breed of general-purpose pig. It was bred in Kemerovo Oblast in south-western Siberia in the Soviet era and was recognised as a breed in 1961. It derives from cross-breeding of boars of various British pig breeds with local Siberian sows.

== History ==
The Kemerovo was bred in the mid-twentieth century in Kemerovo Oblast in south-western Siberia, which at that time was in the Soviet Union. It originated from cross-breeding of local Siberian sows with boars of various British pig breeds, principally of the Berkshire and Large White, but also to some extent of the Large Black. There was some subsequent admixture of other Siberian breeds, among them the North Siberian and the Siberian Black Pied. It received official recognition as a breed in 1961.

There were some 133000 of the pigs in 1960, but by the 1980s the number had fallen to about 53000. Apart from Kemerovo, they were at that time distributed in the Chita, Omsk and Sakhalin Oblasts and in Krasnoyarsk Krai in the Russian Soviet Federative Socialist Republic, in the Kustanai Oblast of the Kazakh Soviet Socialist Republic and in the Tuvan Autonomous Soviet Socialist Republic.

In the twenty-first century its conservation status is uncertain: it was listed by the Food and Agriculture Organization of the United Nations as "not at risk" in 2007, but no population data has been reported to DAD-IS since 2003 – when there were 127000 – and in 2026 its conservation status was listed there as "unknown".

== Characteristics ==
The Kemerovo is a large pig: at three years old, sows weigh on average 240 kg and measure about 160 cm in length, while boars weigh an average of 326 kg and are about 180 cm long.

The coat is black, usually with white markings to the legs, face and tail, occasionally with some white elsewhere on the body. It is thick and helps to protect the animals against the rigid conditions of Siberia – to which they are well adapted.
