= Pinto horse =

Horse with coat color that consists of large patches

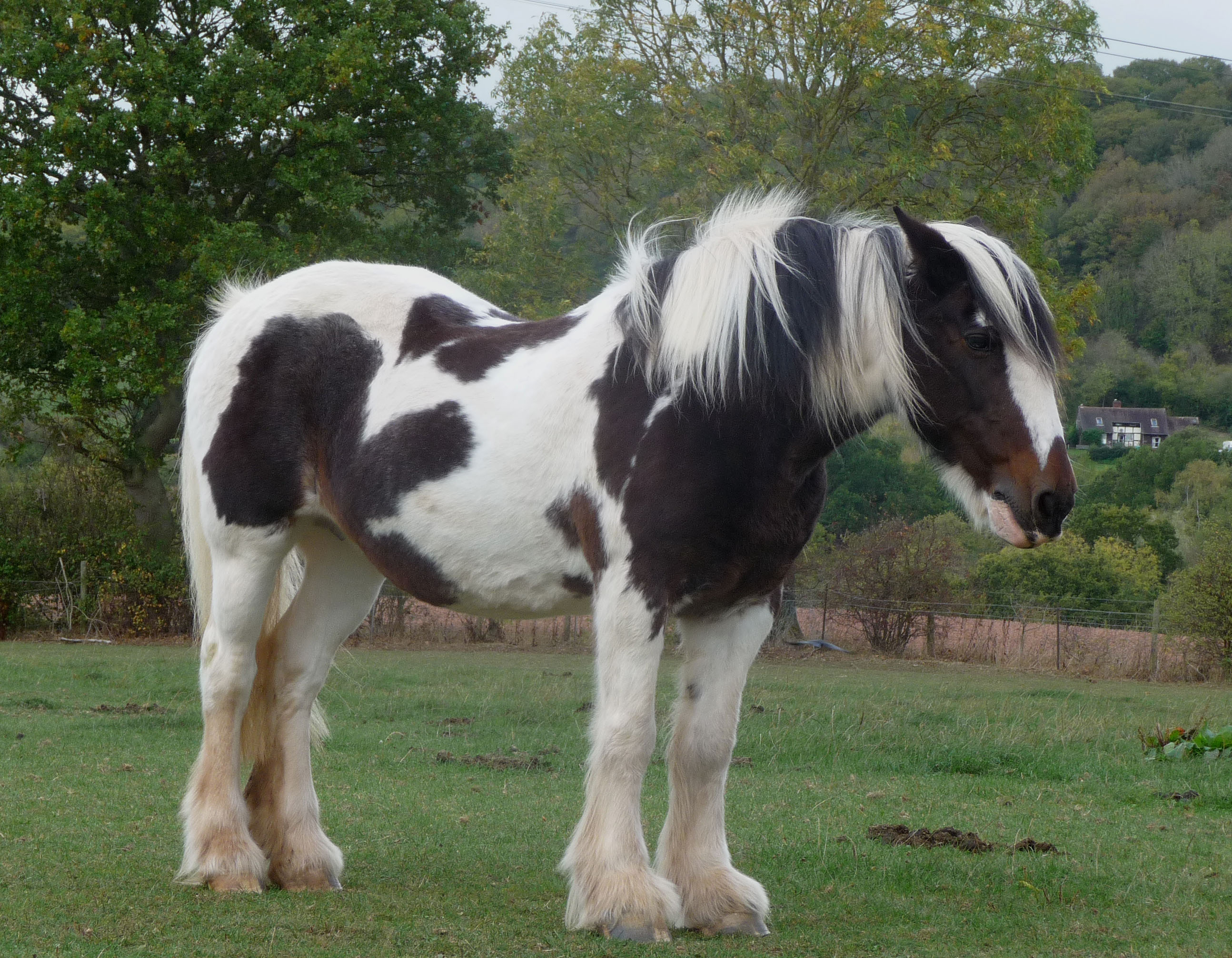
A pinto horse, with patches of white and of another color

A pinto horse has a coat color that consists of large patches of white and any other color. Pinto coloration is also called paint, particolored, or in nations that use British English, piebald. Pinto horses have been around since shortly after the domestication of the horse.

Pinto colors can come in a number of genetically distinct patterns, which have different visual characteristics and tend to make white or leave colored different areas of the horse. These include tobiano, sabino, splashed white, frame, and manchado. A pinto horse may also have a combination of these patterns, such as tovero.

Pinto patterns can be found in various breeds of horses, notably including the American Paint Horse. Color breed registries such as the Pinto Horse Association of America record pedigree and horse show results for pinto horses, regardless of ancestry. Both the terms "Pinto" and "Paint" may sometimes refer to breeds or registries rather than coat color.

Pinto patterns are visually and genetically distinct from the leopard complex spotting patterns characteristic of horse breeds such as the Appaloosa. Breeders who select for color are often careful not to cross the two patterns, and registries that include spotting color preferences often refuse registration to horses that exhibit characteristics of the "wrong" pattern.

== Description ==
A pinto horse has a coat with patches of white fur and patches of another color. The white on a pinto horse is generally asymmetric, unlike for example white added by the leopard complex.

The non-white area has the same colors in the same arrangements as one would see on a solid horse. Overall, the effect is as if a horse with a solid coat had white painted in patches over top. The white areas of a pinto horse generally have pink skin underneath.

A horse with small amounts of white only on the face and/or legs is not called "pinto" but instead said to have white markings. There is no clear dividing line for how much white counts as pinto and how much counts as only white markings, and various breed registries have slightly different rules on how much white must be present and where it must be placed to count as pinto.

The word pinto is Spanish for "painted", "dappled", or "spotted".

== History ==
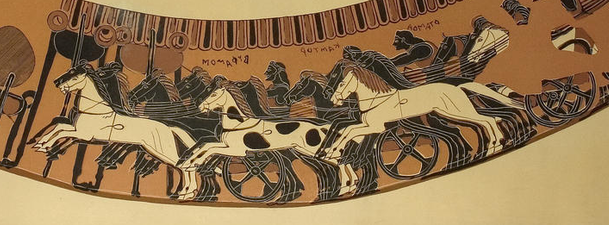
A horse with tobiano-like spotting depicted on a Corinthian black-figure column krater from 570-560 BC

The earliest known pinto horses appeared shortly after horses were domesticated. Analysis of ancient horse DNA found a tobiano horse that lived about 5600 years ago, and a sabino-1 horse that lived about 5000 years ago. Tobiano was at first favored by humans and became especially common during the Iron Age (900 BC to 400 AD), before becoming less frequent again in the Middle Ages.

Images from pottery and other art of ancient antiquity show horses with flashy, spotted patterns, indicating that they may have been desirable traits and selectively bred for. Images of spotted horses appear in the art of Ancient Egypt, and archaeologists have found evidence of horses with spotted coat patterns on the Russian steppes before the rise of the Roman Empire. Later, spotted horses were among those brought to the Americas by the conquistadores.

By the 17th century in Europe, spotted horses were quite fashionable, though when the fad ended, large numbers of newly unsellable horses were shipped to the Americas, some of which were sold, while others were simply turned loose to run wild. The color became popular, particularly among Native Americans, and was specifically bred for in the United States, which now has the greatest number of pinto horses in the world.

== Pinto coats by base color ==
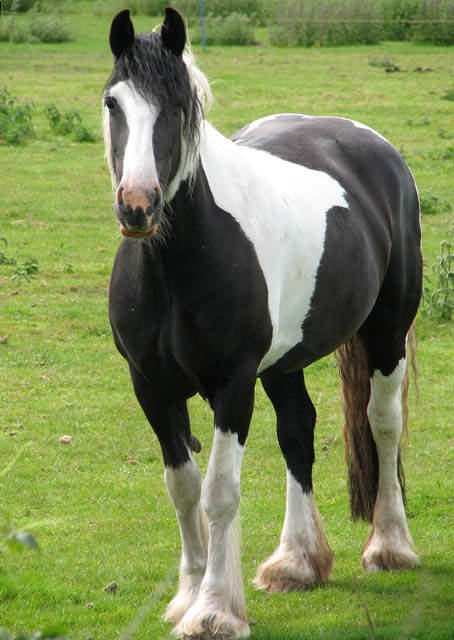
Piebald

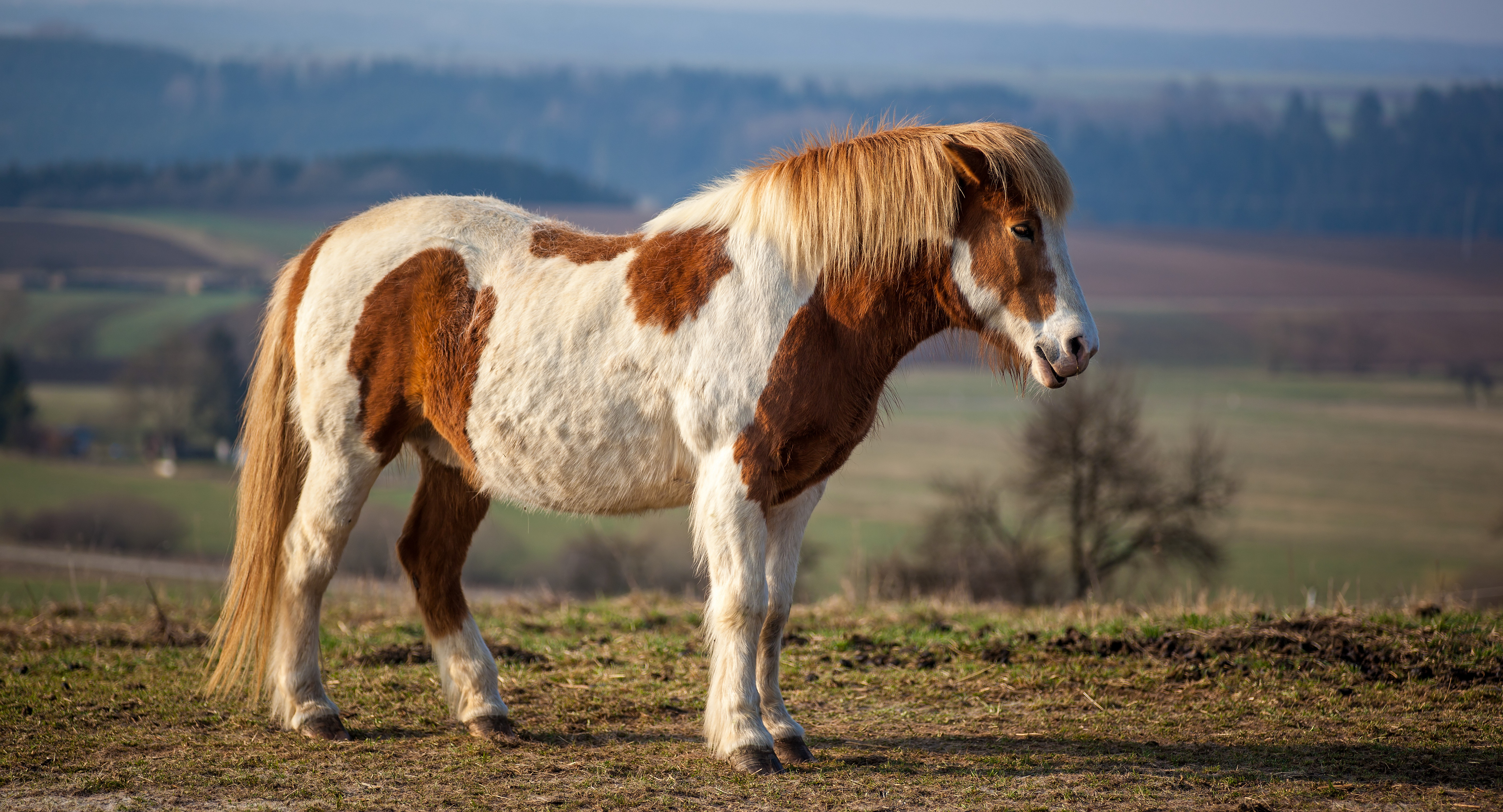
Skewbald

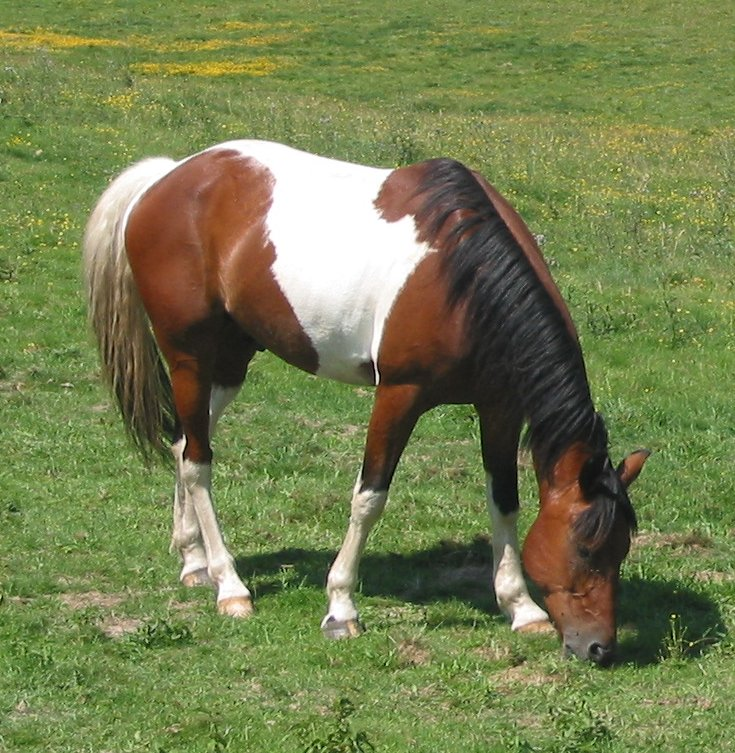
Tricolored

A few words describe pinto horses by giving more detail about the color of the non-white areas, mainly used in British English. This can also be done by including the base color in the coat name, such as "bay pinto" or "pinto palomino".

- Piebald: Any pinto pattern on a black base coat, thus a black-and-white spotted horse. The term comes from "magpie".
- Skewbald: Any pinto pattern on any base coat other than black; as chestnut and bay are the most common base coat colors, skewbalds are most often chestnut and white or bay and white. At one time, the term may have applied more specifically to brown-looking pinto horses, but today it encompasses any color other than black. This term also comes from "magpie" via Scandinavian skjöt.
- Tricolored or tricoloured: A horse with three colors, usually bay (brown and black) and white. Usually considered a type of skewbald.

== Pinto coats by pattern ==
While pinto horses in general have patches of white and patches of color, there are a number of different, separately inherited patterns which tend to arrange the white and colored areas differently.

Pattern	Description
Tobiano	The most recognizable type of pinto, tobiano is a spotting pattern characterized by rounded markings with white legs and white across the back between the withers and the dock of the tail, usually arranged in a roughly vertical pattern. The head is usually dark, and may have facial markings similar to those seen on non-pinto horses such as a star, snip, strip, or blaze. Tobiano is a dominant trait caused by a single gene, so all tobiano horses have at least one tobiano parent.
Frame or frame overo	Frame is characterized by horizontally oriented white patches with jagged, crisp edges. White patches typically include the head, face, and lateral aspects of the neck and body, and the eyes can be blue. Frame overos may have very modest markings that are not obviously pinto. This quality allows the pattern to seemingly "hide" for generations, and is thought to be responsible for some cases of cropouts. The same gene that causes the frame pattern can also cause lethal white syndrome. Although frame overo horses are themselves healthy, if two horses with the frame gene are bred together, there is a 25% chance that the foal will have lethal white syndrome. Affected foals are fully white and die shortly after birth.
Splashed white	A less-common pinto pattern, splashed white coats have horizontally oriented white markings with crisp, smooth edges, and make the horse appear to have been dipped, head lowered, into white paint. The face has significant white markings, and the eyes are usually blue. Most splashed white pintos have normal hearing, but the trait is linked to congenital deafness. Splashed white patterns can be caused by multiple variants of two different genes.
Sabino and dominant white	A group of visually similar patterns which may range from white markings on the face and legs all the way up to a solid white horse. In between those extremes, sabino horses possess a spotting pattern characterized by high white on legs, belly spots, and white markings on the face extending past the eyes. The edges of markings may be "lacy" or patches of roaning patterns standing alone or on the edges of white markings can occur. Sabino may sometimes look similar to roan or rabicano. Of the 30+ forms of sabino and dominant white where the genetic cause is known, all are caused by different alternate variants of the same gene. It's possible that some forms of sabino where the cause is not yet known may turn out to be caused by a different gene or genes.
Manchado	A rare pattern characterized by large, crisp white areas with smooth round spots of color inside them. Usually there will be more white on the dorsal side the neck, and more color on the belly and the ventral side of the neck. It has been seen in the Thoroughbred, Criollo, Polo Pony, Arabian, and Hackney breeds, and almost always in Argentina. The cause of manchado is not known for certain, but Sponenberg & Bellone propose it may be caused by a rare recessive gene.

Some additional terms describe the pattern without specifying the exact pinto pattern. These include:

- Overo: A collective term used primarily by the APHA, overo essentially means "pinto, but not tobiano". It denotes patterns produced by at least three different genetic mechanisms: frame, splashed white, or sabino, described above. These patterns are usually characterized by irregular markings with more jagged edges than tobiano markings. The white usually does not cross the back.
- Tovero: A mix of tobiano and any form of overo coloration, usually reflecting that the horse carries more than one set of genes for a spotting pattern. For example, a tovero may have a mostly white tobiano pattern on the body, but also have blue eyes with or without a white head. Horses can carry multiple spotting genes at the same time, producing characteristics of several patterns.

=== Related terms ===
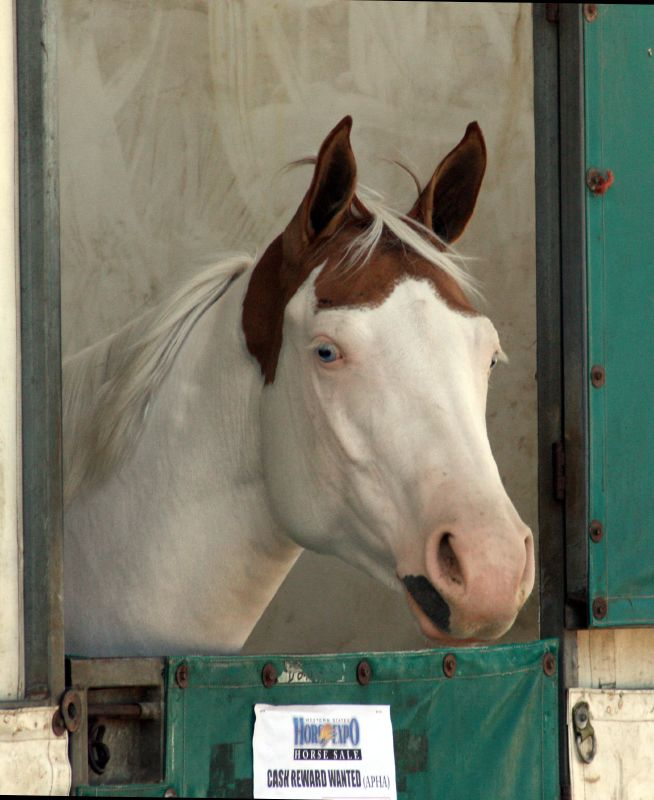
A "medicine hat" marking, dark ears on a white head

- Chrome: This informal term of approval for appealing white markings on the horse can be confusing, as it is also used to describe boldly patterned Appaloosas.
- Solid: In the context of pinto, a solid horse is one with no visible pinto pattern, regardless of whether white markings are present and regardless of whether the horse carries any pinto genes. In other contexts, "solid" may be used to describe a horse with no white markings.
- Medicine hat: An uncommon pattern, the poll and ears are dark, surrounded completely by white, a true "medicine hat" pinto or paint usually has a predominantly white body, sometimes with dark coloration by the flanks, chest, and above the eyes.
- Shield: A large, dark patch covers the chest, surrounded completely by white, usually on a predominantly white horse, sometimes associated with medicine hat patterning.
- Mapping: Areas where the edge between white and color is softer, neither completely white nor completely colored, especially when seen on normally crisp-edged patterns such as tobiano. Mainly of interest to artists.
- Cropout: A pinto horse from two apparently solid-colored parents, typically within a breed whose standard does not allow pinto coloration.

In biology, pinto is considered a type of piebaldism, which is itself a type of leucism.

=== Lethal white syndrome ===
As noted in the description of patterns, the frame gene is associated with a condition called lethal white syndrome. This is a genetic disorder causing foals to die shortly after birth. Affected foals are fully white and have a non-functional colon.

The gene that causes lethal white syndrome is the same gene that causes the frame overo pinto pattern. A single copy results in a frame overo horse, while two copies being present causes lethal white syndrome. Some horses may have the gene without visually appearing to be frame patterned, but a DNA test exists to determine whether a horse is a carrier. Lethal white syndrome can be avoided by not breeding two carriers together.

== Organizations ==
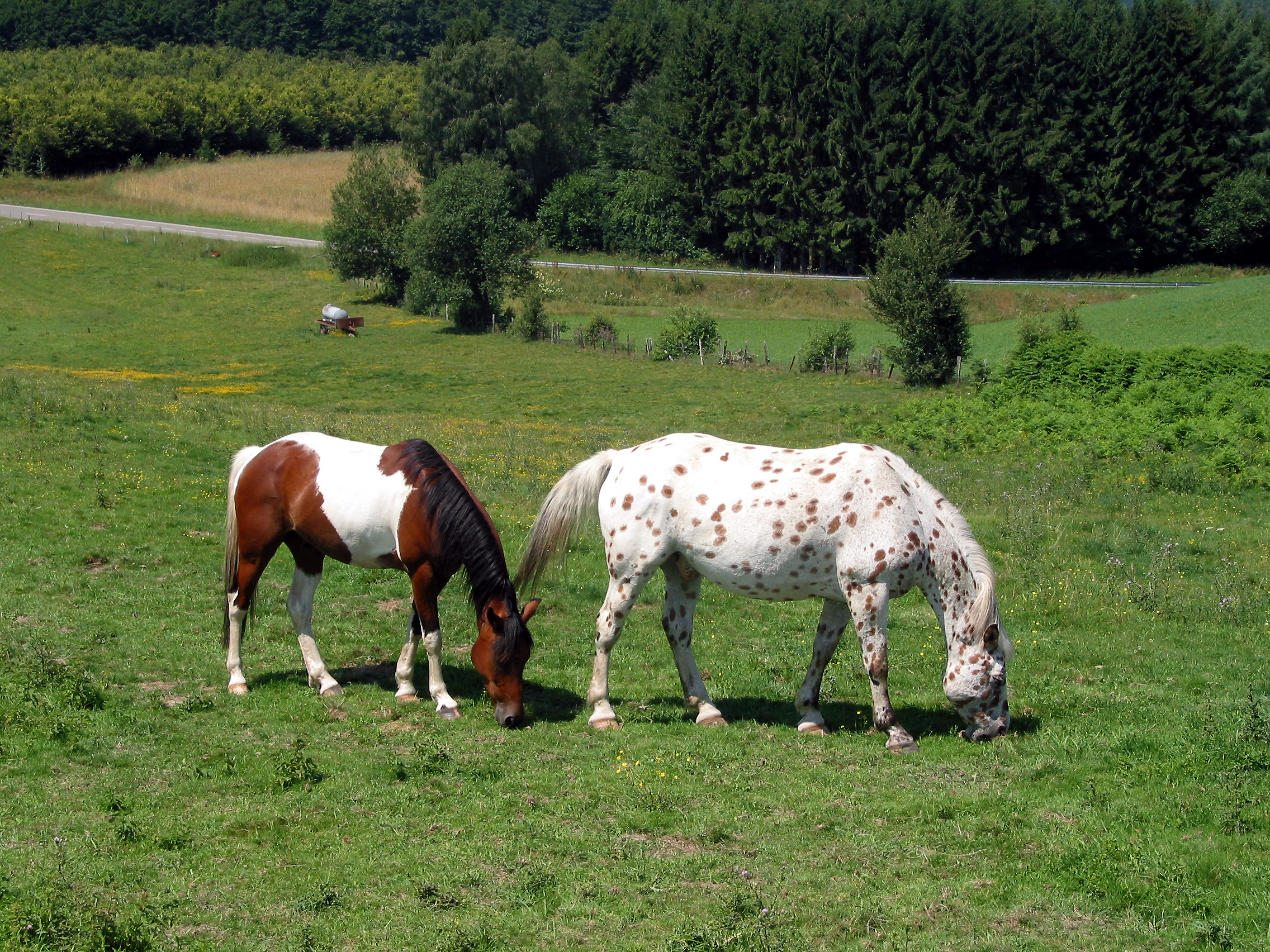
Pinto (left), leopard-spotted Appaloosa (right)

A number of color breed registries encourage the breeding of pinto-colored horses, with varying registration requirements. The less restrictive organizations allow registration of a horse of any breed or combination of breeds with as little as three square inches of white above the knees or hocks, not including facial markings. Some pinto registries do not accept animals with draft horse or mule breeding, though others do. None accepts horses with the genetically distinct Appaloosa pattern, produced by genes in the leopard complex, and the Appaloosa registry in turn does not accept animals with pinto patterns.

When used to refer to breeds, Pinto is a color breed that can be of any type or ancestry, while a Paint is a breed with a specific type and bloodlines.

=== Pinto Horse Association of America ===
The Pinto Horse Association of America (PtHA) was formed in 1956 as a color breed registry, which accepts horses based on coat color regardless of ancestry. Its color registry accepts pinto colored horses, while its solid registry accepts horses that do not meet the minimum color requirements. To qualify as pinto, a horse must have at least four square inches of white fur and pink skin in areas other than the face and lower legs. The color registry does not accept horses with appaloosa characteristics, though the solid registry does. The color registry also requires that both parents of stallions be registered with the PtHA or an approved outcross breed, a requirement that does not apply to ponies, miniatures, or horses of Vanner or Drum type. PtHA maintains a long ear registry for mules and donkeys, which is not color-based and exists primarily to allow such exhibitors to participate in PtHA events. As of 2026, the PtHA claims over 160,000 registered horses. PtHA also sanctions shows across the US in multiple equestrian disciplines.

=== American Paint Horse Association ===
Horses with pinto coloring and verifiable pedigrees tracing to Quarter Horses or Thoroughbreds have been named the American Paint Horse, and are recorded in a separate registry, the American Paint Horse Association. While a Pinto may be of any breed or combination of breeds (possibly with restrictions depending on the registry), a horse that is registered as an American Paint Horse must have at least one parent recorded with the APHA, and both parents must be only of registered American Quarter Horse, American Paint Horse, or Thoroughbred bloodlines. Therefore, most Paint horses may also be registered as Pintos, but not all Pintos are qualified to be registered as Paints.

The American Paint Horse is a very popular breed in the United States, with around 10,000 horses registered annually, roughly two thirds of which are in the US.

=== Pinto in other breeds ===
Many breed registries do not, or at some point in the past did not, accept cropout horses with spots or "excess" white for registration, believing that such animals were likely to be crossbreds, or due to a fear of producing lethal white foals. This exclusion of offspring from pedigreed parents led to the formation not only of the American Paint Horse Association, but also other pinto registries. Among the breeds that excluded such horses were the Arabian Horse and American Quarter Horse registries. Modern DNA testing, though, has revealed that some breeds do possess genes for spotting patterns, such as a non-SB-1 sabino pattern in Arabians, and sabino, overo, and tobiano in Quarter Horses. Therefore, these registries have modified their rules, allowing horses with extra white, if parentage is verified through DNA testing, to be registered. The Jockey Club's Thoroughbred registry, however, still does not officially recognize pinto as a registerable color, though it does allow white body spots to be recorded under the category of markings. The Welsh Pony and Cob Society of the UK also does not accept "piebald" or "skewbald" horses for registration.

== See also ==
- Equine coat color
- Equine coat color genetics
