= Siberian Black Pied =

Breed of pig

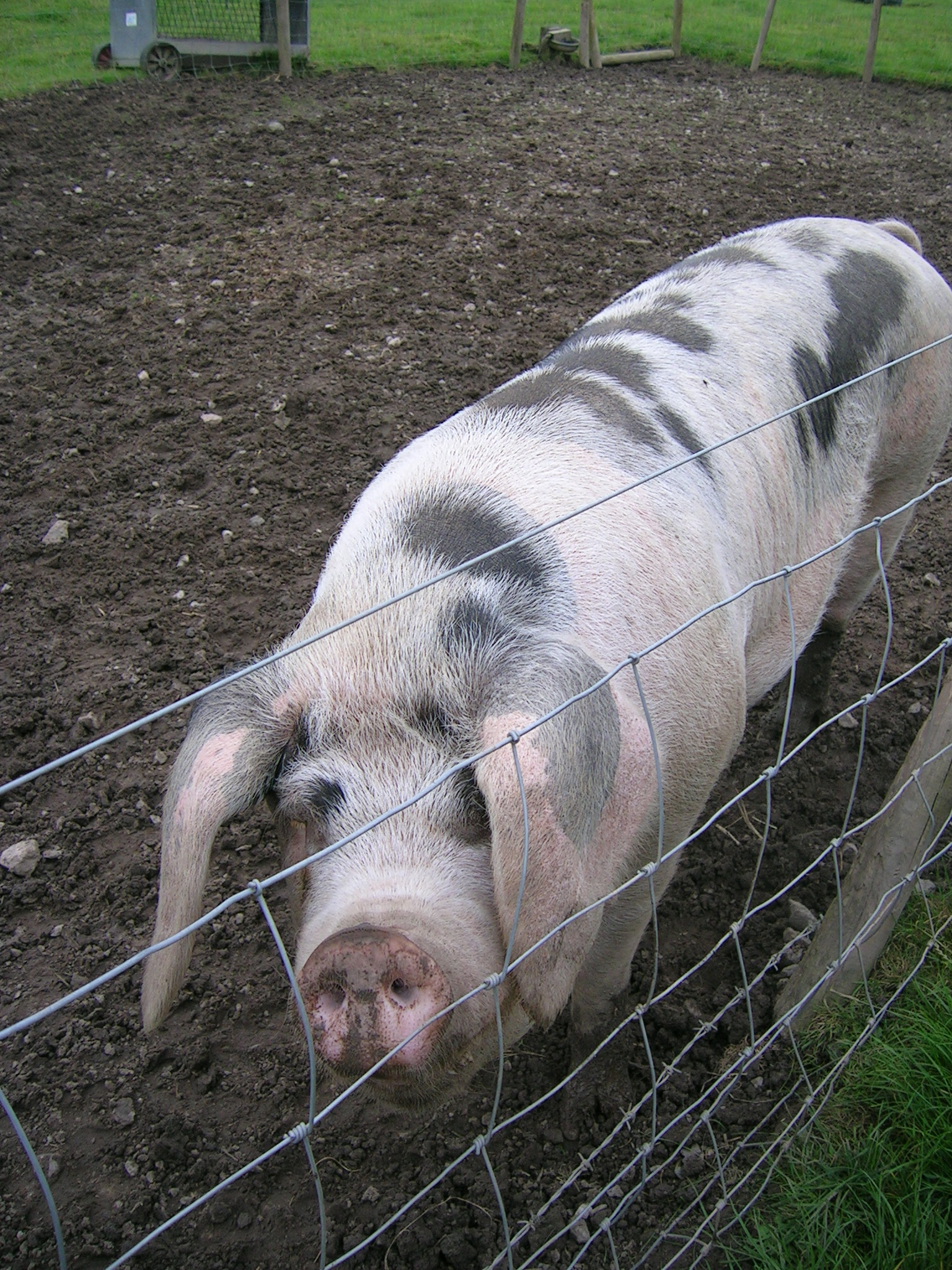
- Other names: Russian: Cибиpcкaя черно-пестрая Sibirskaya cherno-pestraya
- Country of origin: Russia

Traits

The Siberian Black Pied (Russian: Cибиpcкaя черно-пестрая, Sibirskaya cherno-pestraya) is a pig breed from Russia. The breed was raised from stock rejected in the process of developing the North Siberian breed. It is a specialised breed for the Novosibirsk region with headcount ranging from 4000 to 12000 since the 1960s according to the FAO. Some characteristics of the breed include having rough skin that is wrinkle-free on the head and legs, being covered with soft dense bristles and underhair, and having full hams. There exist four boar lines and four sow families.

== See also ==
- List of pig breeds
