= North Siberian pig =

Breed of pig

North Siberian
- Other names: Russian: Cибиpcкaя ceвepнaя Sibirskaya severnaya
- Country of origin: Russia

Traits
- Weight: Male: to 312 kg

The North Siberian (Russian: Cибиpcкaя ceвepнaя, Sibirskaya severnaya) is a general purpose pig breed from Russia. Developed in Novosibirsk Oblast in Russia, this medium-sized breed was formally recognized in 1942. A cross of the short-eared Siberian pigs with Large White boars, the North Siberian was bred for a dense bristle covering and undercoat to increase hardiness to the harsh climate of northern Siberia. Adult males typically reach 312 kg in size.

The North Siberian is a white breed, and multicoloured specimens rejected during the breeding programme were used in the development of the Siberian Black Pied breed.

== See also ==
- List of pig breeds
