= Equine coat color genetics =

Genetics behind the equine coat color

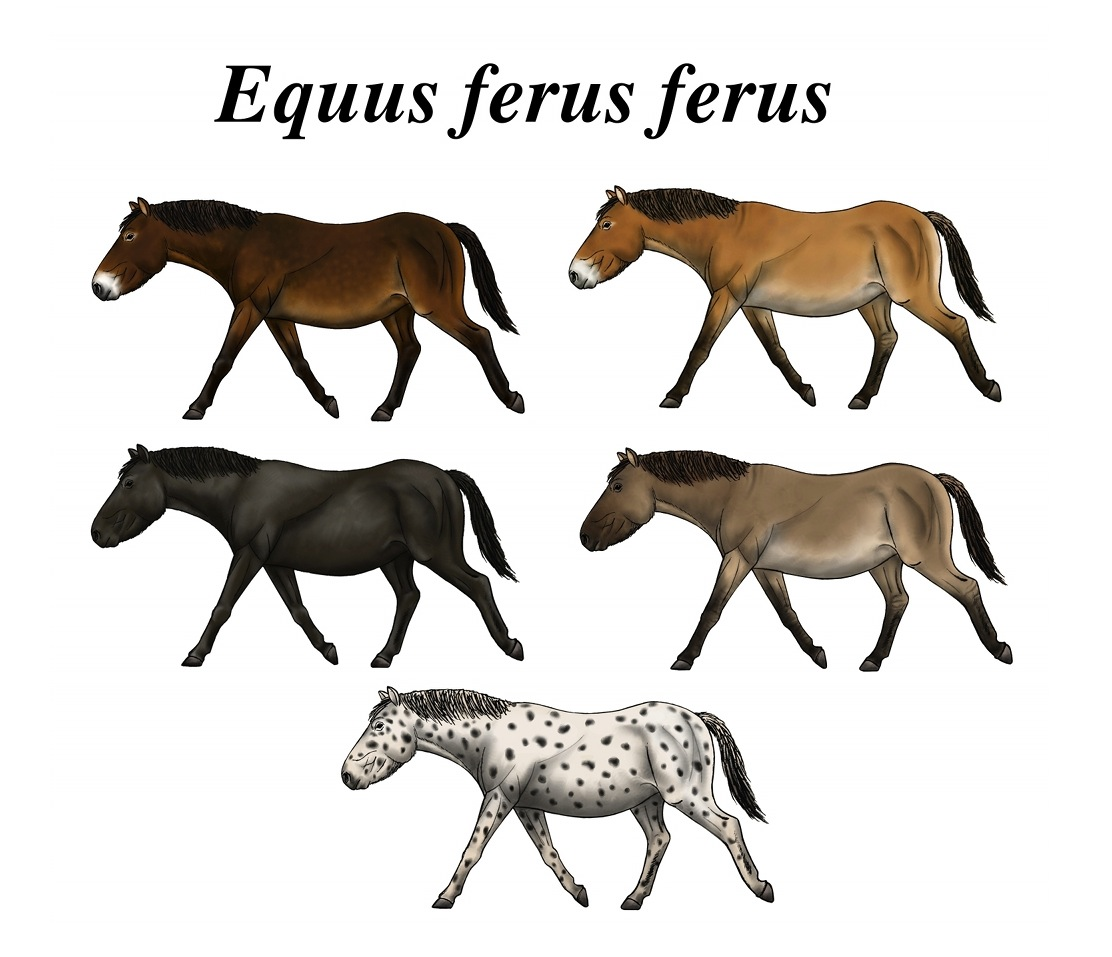
Before domestication, horses are thought to have had these coat colors.

Equine coat color genetics determine a horse's coat color. Many colors are possible, but all variations are produced by changes in only a few genes. Bay is the most common color of horse, followed by black and chestnut. A change at the agouti locus is capable of turning bay to black, while a mutation at the extension locus can turn bay or black to chestnut.

These three "base" colors can be affected by any number of dilution genes and patterning genes. The dilution genes include the wildtype dun gene, believed to be one of the oldest colors extant in horses and donkeys. The dun gene lightens some areas of the horse's coat, while leaving a darker dorsal stripe, mane, tail, face, and legs. Depending on whether it acts on a bay, black, or chestnut base coat, the dun gene produces the colors known as bay dun, grullo, and red dun.

Another common dilution gene is the cream gene, responsible for palomino, buckskin, and cremello horses. Less common dilutions include pearl, champagne, and silver dapple. Some of these genes also lighten eye color.

Genes that affect the distribution of melanocytes create patterns of white spotting or speckling, such as in roan, pinto, leopard, white or white spotting, and even some white markings. Finally, the gray gene causes depigmentation of the hair shaft, slowly adding white hairs over the course of several years until the horse's body hair is near or completely white.

Some of these patterns have complex interactions. For example, a single horse may carry both dilution and white patterning genes, or carry genes for more than one spotting pattern. Horses with a gray gene can be born any color and their hair coat will lighten and change with age.

Most wild equids are dun, as were many horses and asses before domestication of the horse. Some were non-dun with primitive markings, and non-dun 1 is one of the oldest coat color mutations, and has been found in remains from 42,700 years ago, along with dun. Non-dun 2, the version of the dun gene that most domestic horses have, is thought to be much more recent, possibly from after domestication. Leopard complex patterns also predate domestication, having been found in horse remains from 20,000 years ago. The mutation responsible for black and grullo also predates domestication. The mutations causing chestnut, sabino 1, and tobiano appeared shortly after horse domestication, roughly 5000 years ago. Silver and cream dilutions appeared at least 2,600 years ago, and pearl appeared at least 1400 years ago. The gray mutation is also post-domestication but thought to be thousands of years old as well.

== Fundamental concepts ==
=== Terminology ===
Heritable characteristics are transmitted, encoded, and used through a substance called DNA, which is stored in almost every cell in an organism. Proteins are molecules that do a variety of different things in organisms. The DNA instructions for how to make a protein are called a gene. A change to the sequence of DNA is called a mutation. Mutations are not inherently bad; genetic diversity itself ultimately comes from mutations. Mutations that happen within a gene create alternate forms of that gene, which are called alleles. Alleles of a gene are simply slightly different versions of the instructions on how to make that gene's protein. The term "allele" is sometimes replaced with the word "modifier", because different alleles tend to modify the horse's appearance in some way. DNA is organized into storage structures called chromosomes. A chromosome is simply a very long piece of DNA, and a gene is a much shorter piece of it. With some rare exceptions, a gene is always found at the same place within a chromosome, which is called its locus. For the most part, chromosomes come in pairs, one chromosome from each parent. When both chromosomes have the same allele for a certain gene, that individual is said to be homozygous for that gene. When the two alleles are different, it is heterozygous. A horse homozygous for a certain allele will always pass it on to its offspring, while a horse that is heterozygous carries two different alleles and can pass on either one. A trait that is only expressed when the gene is homozygous for its allele is called recessive, and a trait that has the same effect no matter whether there is one copy or two is called dominant.

=== Notation ===
Often, the dominant allele is represented by an uppercase letter and the recessive allele by a lowercase letter. For instance, in silver dapple, this is Z for the dominant silver trait and z for the recessive non-silver trait. However, sometimes the alleles are distinguished by which is the "normal" or wild type allele and which is a more recent mutation. In our example z (non-silver) would be wild type and Z would be a mutation. Wild type alleles can be represented as + or n, so Zz, Zz^{+}, Z/+, and Z/n are all valid ways to describe a horse heterozygous for silver. Wild type notation is mainly useful when there is no clear dominant/recessive relationship, such as with cream and frame overo, or when there are many alleles on the same gene, such as with MITF, which has four known alleles. Using n is also common in the results of genetic tests, where a negative result usually means none of the known mutations were found, but does not rule out undiscovered mutations.

=== Melanin ===
Genes affecting coat color generally do so by changing the process of producing melanin. Melanin is the pigment that colors the hairs and skin of mammals. There are two chemically distinct types of melanin: pheomelanin, which is a red to yellow color, and eumelanin, which is brown to black. Melanin is not a protein and therefore there is no gene that changes its structure directly, but there are many proteins involved in the production of melanin or the formation of melanocytes during embryonic development. Mutations that change the structure of proteins with a role in melanin production can result in slightly different variations of melanin. Some genes do not alter the structure of melanin but instead affect where and whether it is produced.

== Extension and agouti ==
The genes extension and agouti together affect the placement of the two types of pigment, black eumelanin and "red" (coppery brown) pheomelanin.

The extension gene codes for a molecule called the Melanocortin 1 receptor, or MC1R. This receptor straddles the membrane of pigment cells, and when activated it signals the cell to produce black pigment instead of red. A recessive mutation to extension removes this functionality, causing the solid red color of chestnut horses. Extension does not affect skin color. The dominant, wildtype, allele of extension is called E, and the non-extension mutation is called e. Extension is epistatic to agouti, meaning that if a horse has two e alleles, it will be chestnut no matter what genotype it has at agouti.

The agouti gene codes for a molecule called the agouti-signaling protein, or ASIP. This molecule interacts with MC1R, the receptor coded by extension, to block the signal for black pigment production. The signal for black pigment comes from a melanocyte-stimulating hormone, which is present throughout the horse. ASIP is not present everywhere, which allows some areas to be black while others are red. ASIP can also be limited by the phase of hair growth, allowing the tips of the hairs to be black while the base is red. This can be observed in horses which have their winter coats clipped. When shaved close, the black tip is shorn off leaving the phaeomelanic bottom of the shaft. This produces a dull, orange-gold appearance on the body coat which is lost with the spring shed. This is not usually seen in dark bays, which have little red in the hair shaft. A mutation to agouti removes the ability to block the black signal, resulting in a fully black horse. The dominant, wildtype, allele of agouti is called A, and the non-agouti mutation is called a.

=== Phenotypes ===
Extension	Agouti	Image	Description
ee	any		Chestnut, or depending on other genes red dun, palomino, cremello, gold champagne, and others.
EE or Ee	aa		Black, or depending on other genes grullo, smoky cream, silver dapple, classic champagne, and others.
EE or Ee	AA or Aa		Bay, or depending on other genes bay dun, buckskin, perlino, silver bay, amber champagne, and others.

=== Extension ===
Extension is found on equine chromosome 3 as part of a linkage group with roan, tobiano, and the KIT gene. Extension is also sometimes called "red factor" and can be identified through DNA testing. Horses with the genotype E/E are sometimes called "homozygous black", however depending on the agouti genotype there is no guarantee that any offspring can be black coated, only that no offspring will be "red".

A study that compared horse genotypes to their coat color phenotypes did find a statistically significant connection that suggested that lighter bay shades were heterozygous for the Extension mutation (E/e) and darker bay shades were homozygous.

Mutations that break protein function generally lead to recessively inherited lighter or redder coat colors in various mammals, while mutations that cause MC1R to be constantly active result in dominantly inherited black coats. In horses, both known mutations break the protein and therefore result in red coats.

Various mutations in the human MC1R gene result in red hair, blond hair, fair skin, and susceptibility to sunburnt skin and melanoma. Polymorphisms of MC1R also lead to light or red coats in mice, cattle, and dogs, among others. The Extension locus was first suggested to have a role in horse coat color determination in 1974 by Stefan Adalsteinsson. Researchers at Uppsala University, Sweden, identified a missense mutation in the MC1R gene that resulted in a loss-of-function of the MC1R protein. Without the ability to produce a functional MC1R protein, eumelanin production could not be initiated in the melanocyte, resulting in coats devoid of true black pigment. Since horses with only one copy of the defective gene were normal, the mutation was labeled e.

=== Extension alleles ===
There are three known alleles of extension, the wildtype E, and two recessive alleles e and e^{a} which cause chestnut color. The E allele can also be called E^{+} or E^{E}, and the e allele may also be called E^{e}.

Of the two known mutations, the first to be discovered was e, and is a change of a single cytosine to thymine at base pair 901 which results in the serine in position 83 being changed to a phenylalanine. In 2000 e^{a} was found, which is a change of a single guanine to adenine at base pair 903, resulting in aspartate being changed to asparagine at position 84 in the polypeptide. Visually there is no difference between the two.

=== Agouti ===
In many species, successive pulses of ASIP block contact between α-MSH and MC1R, resulting in alternating production of eumelanin and pheomelanin; hairs are banded light and dark as a result. In other species, ASIP is regulated such that it only occurs in certain parts of the body. The light undersides of most mammals are due to the carefully controlled action of ASIP. In mice, two mutations on Agouti are responsible for yellow coats and marked obesity, with other health defects. Additionally, the Agouti locus is the site of mutations in several species that result in black-and-tan pigmentations.

One genetics testing lab began offering a test for another allele A^{t}, thought to be responsible for seal brown, but it was later found to be inaccurate and is no longer offered.

== Dun ==
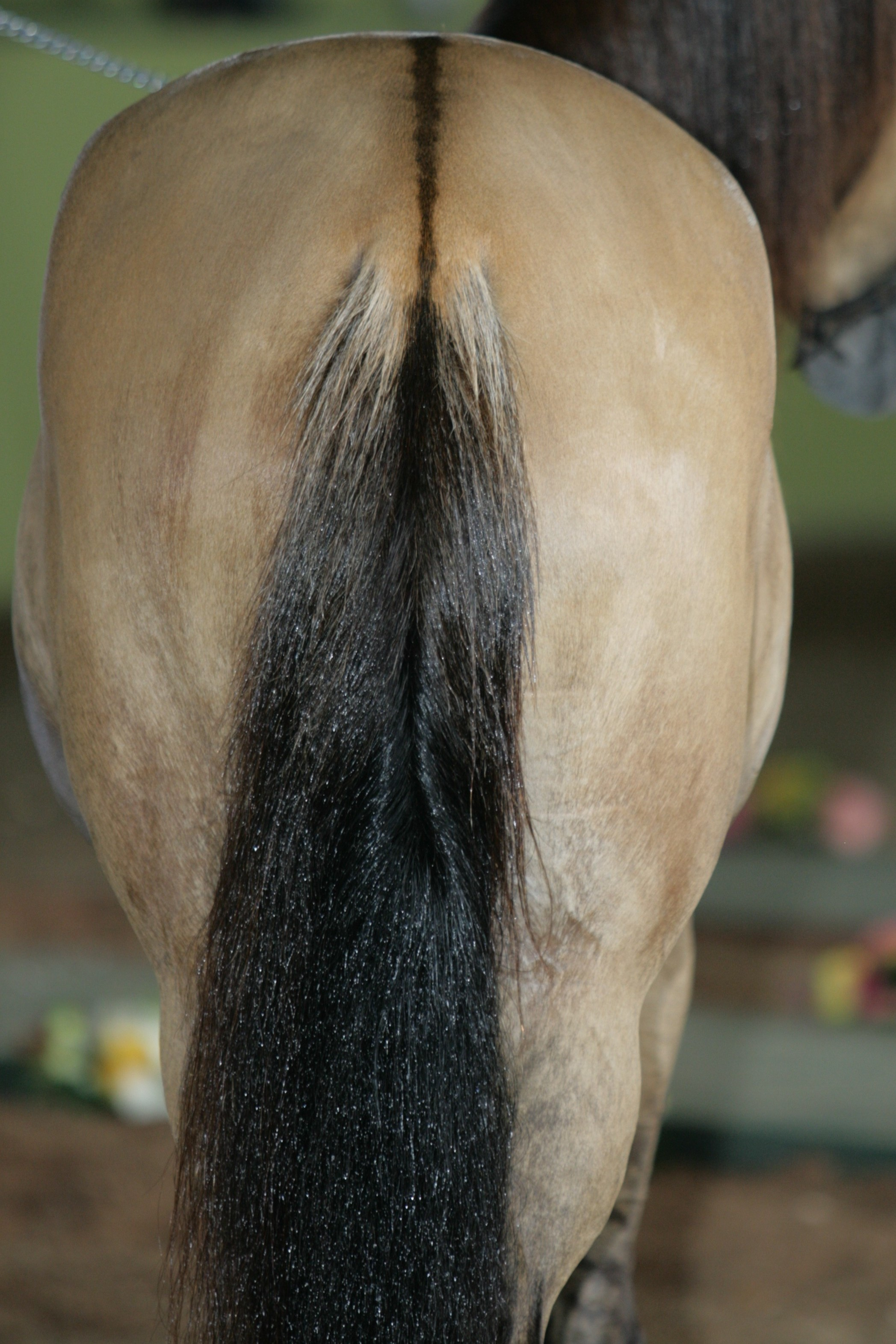
The flat, earthy tone of the coat and vivid dorsal stripe are indicative of the D allele. Primitive markings are seldom visible on horses without the dominant, wildtype dun allele (D).

Dun is one of several genes that control the saturation or intensity of pigment in the coat. Dun is unique in that it is simple dominant, affects eumelanin and pheomelanin equally, and does not affect the eyes or skin. Horses with the dominant D allele (D/D or D/d genotype) exhibit hypomelanism of the body coat, while d/d horses have otherwise intense, saturated coat colors. The mane, tail, head, legs, and primitive markings are not diluted. Zygosity for Dun can be determined with a DNA test.

The Dun locus is TBX3 on equine chromosome 8. The molecular cause behind the dun coat colors is not entirely understood, but the dilution effect comes from the placement of pigment in only part of the hair. The associated coat colors were assigned to the Dun locus in 1974 by Stefan Adalsteinsson, separate from Cream, with the presence of dun dilution indicated by the dominant D allele. The dominant D allele is relatively rare compared to the alternative d allele, and for this reason, the dominant allele is often treated as a mutation. However, the pervasive coat color among wild equids is dun, and researchers from Darwin to modern day consider dun to be the wildtype state.

An older non-dun mutation was found in 2015 and named non-dun 1. It creates primitive markings but does not dilute the base color, and is co-dominant with the more common non-dun 2 but recessive to dun.

=== Dun phenotypes ===
- D/D (+/+, D^{+}/D^{+}) wildtype, homozygous dominant. Visually, the horse may be bay dun, grullo, red dun, palomino dun, amber dun, gray, and so on. Such a horse will always pass on the D allele and will therefore always have dun offspring.
- D/d (+/d, D^{+}/D^{d}) wildtype, heterozygous. Visually indistinguishable from the homozygous D horse.
- d/d (D^{d}/D^{d}) non-dun, homozygous recessive. The entire coat, barring the influence of other alleles, is a rich, saturated color. The primitive markings are no longer visible. The horse may be chestnut, bay, black, gray, palomino, and so on.

== Cream ==
Cream is another gene that control the saturation or dilution of pigment in the coat. Cream differs from Dun in that it affects the coat, skin, and eyes, and unlike Dun, is dosage dependent rather than simple dominant. Furthermore, the effects on eumelanin and pheomelanin are not equal. Horses with the homozygous recessive genotype (C/C) are not affected by cream. Heterozygotes (C^{Cr}/C) have one cream allele and one wildtype non-cream allele. Such horses, sometimes called "single-dilutes", exhibit dilution red pigment in the coat, eyes, and skin to yellow or gold, while eumelanin is largely unaffected. Homozygotes (C^{Cr}/C^{Cr}) have two cream alleles, and are sometimes called "double-dilutes." Homozygous creams exhibit strong dilution of both red and black pigment in the coat, eyes, and skin to ivory or cream. The skin is rosy-pink and the eyes are pale blue. Cream is now identifiable by DNA test.

The Cream locus is occupied by the Solute carrier family 45, member 2 (SLC45A2) gene, also called the Membrane associated transport protein or Matp gene. The Matp gene encodes a protein illustrated to have roles in melanogenesis in humans, mice, and medaka, though the specific action is not known.

Mutations in the human Matp gene result in several distinct forms of Oculocutaneous albinism, Type IV as well as normal variations in skin and hair color. Mice affected by a condition homologous to cream, called underwhite, exhibit irregularly shaped melanosomes, which are the organelles within melanocytes that directly produce pigment. The first descriptions of the dosage-dependent genetic control of the palomino coat color occurred early on in equine coat color inheritance research. However, the distinction between Dun and Cream remained poorly understood until Stefan Adalsteinsson wrote Inheritance of the palomino color in Icelandic horses in 1974. The mutation responsible, a single nucleotide polymorphism in Exon 2 resulting in an aspartic acid-to-asparagine substitution (N153D), was located and described in 2003 by a research team in France.

=== Cream phenotypes ===
- C/C homozygous wildtype. Visually, the horse may be any color other than the cream dilute shades of palomino, buckskin, smoky black, cremello, perlino, smoky cream, and so on.
- C^{Cr}/C heterozygous. The colors most commonly associated with this genotype are palomino, buckskin, and smoky black, though the phenotype may vary depending on other factors. Any pheomelanin in the coat is diluted to yellow or gold, and the eyes and skin are often slightly lighter than unaffected horses.
- C^{Cr}/C^{Cr} homozygous. The colors most commonly associated with this genotype are cremello, perlino, and smoky cream. Regardless, the coat will be cream- or ivory-colored, and the skin a rosy-pink. The eyes are pale blue.

== Champagne ==
Champagne is a gene that controls the saturation or dilution of pigment in the coat. Unlike Cream, Champagne is not strongly dosage-dependent, and affects both types of pigment equally. Champagne differs from Dun in that it affects the color of the coat, skin, and eyes, and in that the unaffected condition is the wildtype. Horses with the dominant CH allele (CH/CH or CH/ch genotype) exhibit hypomelanism of the body coat, such that phaeomelanin is diluted to gold and eumelanin is diluted to tan. Affected horses are born with blue eyes which darken to amber, green, or light brown, and bright pink skin which acquires darker freckling with maturity. The difference in phenotype between the homozygous (CH/CH) and heterozygous (CH/ch) horse may be subtle, in that the coat of the homozygote may be a shade lighter, with less mottling. Horses with the homozygous recessive genotype (ch/ch) are not affected by champagne. Champagne is now identifiable by DNA test.

The Champagne locus is occupied by the Solute carrier family 36, member 1 (SLC36A1) gene, which encodes the Proton-coupled amino acid transporter 1 (PAT1) protein. This protein is one of many which is involved in active transport. The gene associated with the Cream coat colors is also a solute carrier, and orthologous genes in humans, mice, and other species are also linked to coat color phenotypes. The single nucleotide polymorphism responsible for the champagne phenotype is a missense mutation in exon 2, in which a C is replaced with a G, such that a threonine is replaced with arginine. This mutation was identified and described by an American research team in 2008.

=== Champagne phenotypes ===
- ch/ch (N/N) wildtype, homozygous recessive. Visually, the horse may be any color other than the champagne shades.
- CH/ch (CH/N) heterozygous. The colors most commonly associated with this genotype are gold champagne, amber champagne, and classic champagne, though the exact phenotype depends on a variety of factors. At birth, the skin is bright pink and the eyes bright blue, darkening to freckled and light brown or green, respectively, with age. Both red and black pigment in the hair are also diluted.
- CH/CH homozygous champagne. Homozygotes, which will never produce non-champagne offspring, are indistinguishable from heterozygotes except that their freckling may be sparser, and their coats a shade lighter.

== Alleles and effects ==
Locus	Alleles	Effect of combined pairs of alleles
MC1R (Extension)	E e e^{a}	EE, Ee, or Ee^{a}: Horse forms black pigment in skin and hair, and may be black, seal brown, or bay. ee, ee^{a}, or e^{a}e^{a}: Horse is chestnut; it has black pigment in skin, but red pigment in hair.
ASIP (Agouti)	A a	Agouti: Restricts eumelanin, or black pigment, to "points," allowing red coat color to show on body. No visible effect on red horses, as there is no black pigment to restrict. AA or Aa horse is bay, black hair shows only in points pattern (usually mane, tail, legs, sometimes tips of ears). aa: If horse has E allele, then horse will be uniformly black.
MATP (Cream, Pearl)	Cr prl n	Cr/Cr: Horse is a double dilute cream (cremello, perlino, or smoky cream) and will have creamy off-white hair with pale eyes and skin. Cr/n: Horse is a single dilute cream (palomino, buckskin, or smoky black/black carrying cream) with red pigment diluted to gold. prl/prl: Horse is pearl. Red is lightened to an apricot color, and skin coloration is pale. Cr/prl: Horse is a pseudo-double cream with pale skin and eyes. n/n: Horse has normal, undiluted, coloration.
TBX3 (Dun)	D nd1 nd2 or d	D/D, D/nd1, or D/nd2: Dun gene Wildtype dilution. Horse shows a diluted body color to pinkish-red, yellow-red, yellow or mouse gray and has dark points called primitive markings including dorsal stripe, shoulder stripe and leg barring. nd1/nd1: Horse is very slightly diluted and primitive markings are darker. nd1/nd2: Horse is not diluted and has faint primitive markings. nd2/nd2: Horse has undiluted coat color with no primitive markings.
SLC36A1 (Champagne)	Ch n	Champagne: A dominant dilution gene that creates freckled skin, amber or green-ish eyes, and gives a bronze cast to hair. The skin surrounding the eye must be pink with freckles in adulthood. Ch/Ch or Ch/n: Champagne dilution evident (See Genetic Formulas Chart below.) chch: No champagne dilution
PMEL or SILV (Silver dapple)	Z n	Z/Z or Z/n: Silver dapple - Dilutes eumelanin (black pigment). Converts black to brown with white/silvery mane and tail or results in silver coloring. n/n: No silver.
MFSD12 (Mushroom)	Mu mu	Mu/Mu or Mu/mu: Mushroom - Dilutes red pigment to a sepia shade. mu/mu: No mushroom effect.
STX17 (Gray)	G g	G/G or G/n: gray gene. Horse is born another color and "greys out" as it ages. Pigment in the skin does not change throughout the greying process. Gray The greying process is progressive and unique to the horse. n/n: No grey.
EDNRB (Frame Overo/Lethal white syndrome)	OLW or Fr n	OLW/n: Frame Overo pattern - Pinto horse pattern that forms a solid "frame" around white spotting. White is usually horizontal in orientation with jagged edges, rarely crossing the back, and often has a top-heavy face marking. The Overo "OLW" allele is different from overo as a color pattern classification in those registries which also include the splashed white and sabino genes under the heading "overo." n/n: No frame overo present. OLW/OLW: Homozygous frame overo is lethal white syndrome, characterized by an incomplete colon and the inability to defecate, which leads to death or humane euthanization within days of birth.
Inversion starting about 100k bp downstream of KIT (Tobiano)	TO n	TO/TO or TO/n: Tobiano, a form of pinto patterning. Produces regular and distinct ovals or rounded patterns of white and color with a somewhat vertical orientation. White extends across the back, down the legs, and often over the shoulder and crest. A white tail head is also very common. n/n: No tobiano pattern present.
KIT or CD117 (White, Sabino)	W1; W2... W27; SB1 n	Complicated. See white and sabino. W/W: Thought to be lethal. Embryo reabsorbed or fetus dies en utero. W/n, W5/W20, W20/W22, or SB1/SB1: Horse has pink skin and white hair, usually with brown or dark eyes. Hair coat is white from birth. There may be some patches of color, which may fade to white as the horse grows older. When this is caused by SB1 it may be referred to as "maximum sabino". SB1/n - Classic sabino has assorted pinto or roan-like markings. Recognized by abundant white on the legs, belly spots or body spots that can be flecked or roaned, chin spots, or white on the face extending past the eyes. Sabino is registered as overo by some registries, but is not frame overo and does not cause overo lethal white syndrome. n/n: No sabino. Note: The above applies when W is one of W1, W2, W3, W4, W9, W10, W11, W13, W14, W17, W23, W24, or W25. See white for a description of the other W alleles.
Near or at KIT (Roan)	RN n	RN/RN or RN/n: roan pattern of white hair mixed in with base color. Head and lower legs remain dark. Inverted "V"s are present just above the knees. It used to be thought that roan was homozygous lethal, but since then living homozygous roan horses have been found. n/n: No roan.
TRPM1 (Leopard complex)	LP n	Appaloosa or Leopard spotting gene. Produces coat spotting patterns, mottling over otherwise dark skin, striped hooves and often white sclera. Can also produce varnish roan. LP/LP: Fewspot or snowcap horse. LP/n: Leopard or blanket horse. n: No leopard complex.
RFWD3 (Pattern 1)	PATN1 n	PATN1/PATN1 or PATN1/n: Combined with the leopard complex, produces a leopard/fewspot or near-leopard/near-fewspot horse. It has no visible effect on n/n (for LP) horses. n/n: Horse is solid or varnish roan, unless it has (an)other (as yet undiscovered) PATN gene(s).
MITF (Splashed white, macchiato)	SW1; SW3 macchiato n	SW1/SW1: Classic splashed white. SW1/n: White markings on head and legs. SW3/SW3: May be embryonic lethal. SW3/n: Splashed white. Macchiato/n: The macchiato allele has been found in a single stallion named Apache, who had a white pattern in similar places as for splashed white, a dilution, deafness, and reduced fertility. It is likely that this mutation will not be passed on. n/n: No splashed white or macchiato.
PAX3 (Splashed white)	SW2; SW4 n	SW2/SW2: Previously thought to be lethal, but SW2/SW2 horses have since been identified. However it often causes short tongue and/or infertility. SW2/n: Splashed white, but usually not as loud as a classic splash. SW4/SW4: Might be lethal. SW4/n: Splashed white or broad blaze. n/n: No splashed white.

== Notable color combinations ==
Phenotype	Potential Genotype					
	Extension	Agouti	Dun	Champagne	Silver	Cream/Pearl
Bay	E/-	A/-	d/d	ch/ch	z/z	n/n or n/prl
Chestnut	e/e	-/-	d/d	ch/ch	-/-	n/n or n/prl
Black	E/-	a/a	d/d	ch/ch	z/z	n/n or n/prl
Bay dun	E/-	A/-	D/-	ch/ch	z/z	n/n or n/prl
Red dun	e/e	-/-	D/-	ch/ch	-/-	n/n or n/prl
Grullo (Blue dun)	E/-	a/a	D/-	ch/ch	z/z	n/n or n/prl
Amber champagne	E/-	A/-	d/d	Ch/-	z/z	n/n or n/prl
Gold champagne	e/e	-/-	d/d	Ch/-	-/-	n/n or n/prl
Classic champagne	E/-	a/a	d/d	Ch/-	z/z	n/n or n/prl
Silver bay	E/-	A/-	d/d	ch/ch	Z/-	n/n or n/prl
Silver black	E/-	a/a	d/d	ch/ch	Z/-	n/n or n/prl
Buckskin	E/-	A/-	d/d	ch/ch	z/z	Cr/n
Perlino	E/-	A/-	d/d	ch/ch	z/z	Cr/Cr
Palomino	e/e	-/-	d/d	ch/ch	-/-	Cr/n
Cremello	e/e	-/-	d/d	ch/ch	-/-	Cr/Cr
Bay pearl	E/-	A/-	d/d	ch/ch	z/z	prl/prl
Bay pseudo-double pearl	E/-	A/-	d/d	ch/ch	z/z	Cr/prl
Apricot (Chestnut pearl)	e/e	-/-	d/d	ch/ch	-/-	prl/prl
Chestnut pseudo-double pearl	e/e	-/-	d/d	ch/ch	-/-	Cr/prl
Black pearl	E/-	a/a	d/d	ch/ch	z/z	prl/prl
Black pseudo-double pearl	E/-	a/a	d/d	ch/ch	z/z	Cr/prl
Dunskin	E/-	A/-	D/-	ch/ch	z/z	Cr/n
Dunalino	e/e	-/-	D/-	ch/ch	-/-	Cr/n
Silver buckskin	E/-	A/-	d/d	ch/ch	Z/-	Cr/n
Silver smoky	E/-	a/a	d/d	ch/ch	Z/-	Cr/n
Gold cream	e/e	-/-	d/d	Ch/-	-/-	Cr/n
Amber cream	E/-	A/-	d/d	Ch/-	z/z	Cr/n
Classic cream	E/-	a/a	d/d	Ch/-	z/z	Cr/n

== See also ==
- Equine coat color
- Tiger eye
- Horse genome
- Horse breeding
- Ann T. Bowling
