= Amelanism =

Pigmentation abnormality

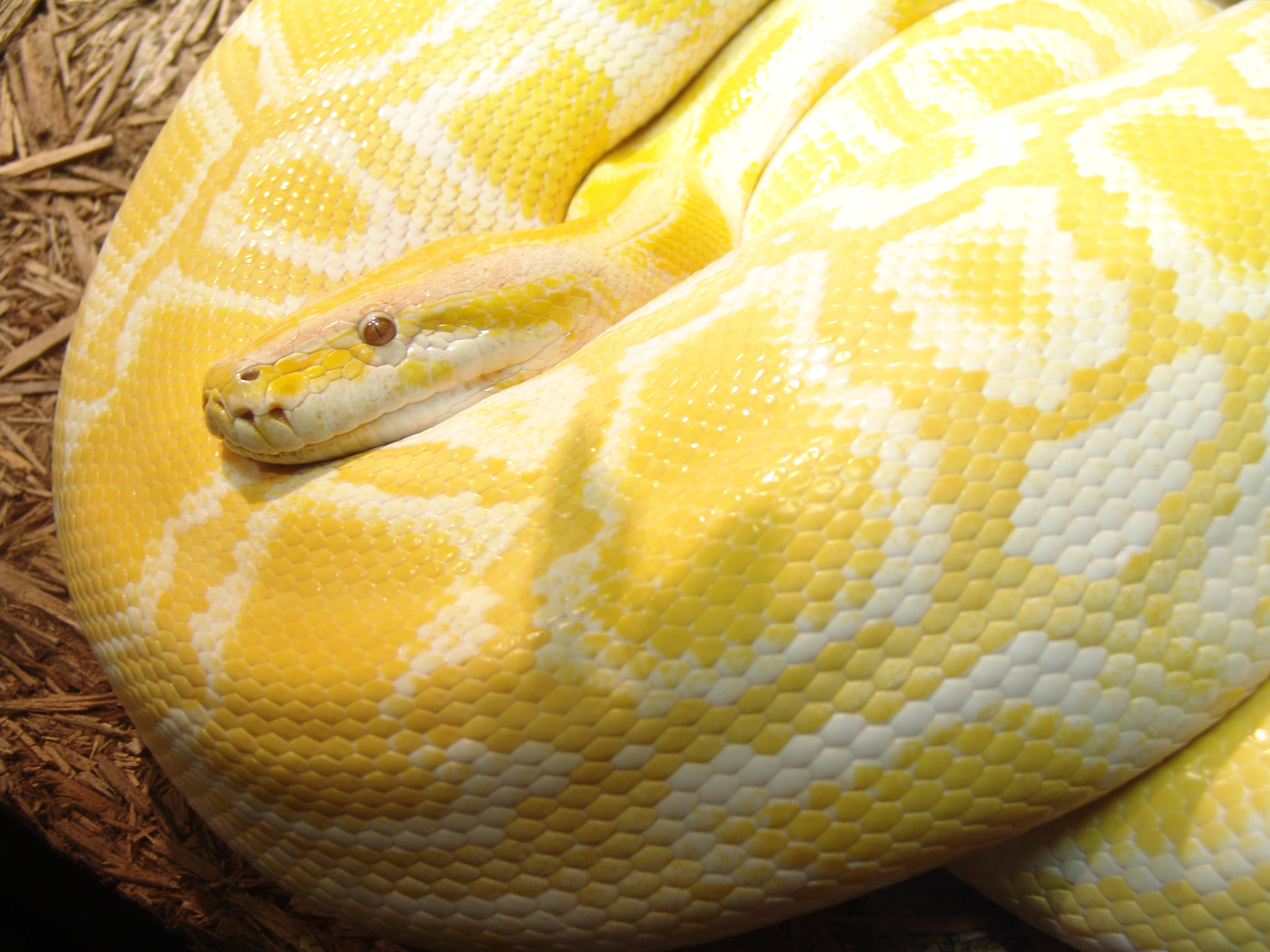
Often called "albino", this amelanistic Burmese python owes its yellow color to unaffected carotenoid pigments.

Amelanism (also known as amelanosis) is a pigmentation abnormality characterized by the lack of pigments called melanins, commonly associated with a genetic loss of tyrosinase function. Amelanism can affect fish, amphibians, reptiles (including birds), and mammals including humans. The appearance of an amelanistic animal depends on the remaining non-melanin pigments. The opposite of amelanism is melanism, a higher percentage of melanin.

A similar condition, albinism, is a hereditary condition characterised in animals by the absence of pigment in the eyes, skin, hair, scales, feathers or cuticle. This results in an all white animal, usually with pink or red eyes.

== Melanins and melanin production ==
Melanin is a compound found in plants, animals, and protists, and is derived from the amino acid tyrosine. Melanin is a photoprotectant, absorbing the DNA-damaging ultraviolet radiation of the sun. Vertebrates have melanin in their skin and hair, feathers, or scales. They also have two layers of pigmented tissue in the eye: the stroma, at the front of the iris, and the iris pigment epithelium, a thin but critical layer of pigmented cells at the back of the iris. Melanin is also present in the inner ear, and is important for the early development of the auditory system. Melanin is also found in parts of the brain and adrenal gland.

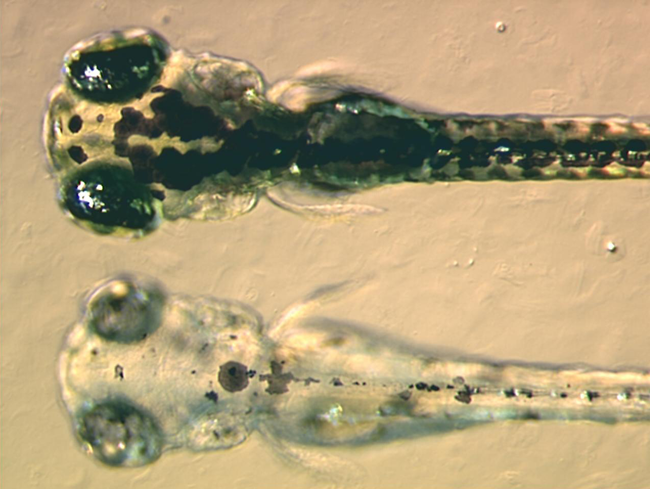
The normal zebrafish embryo, above, shows the migration and maturation of melanocytes. The amelanistic embryo, below, has melanocytes but no melanin.

Melanins are produced in organelles called melanosomes. The production of melanins is called melanogenesis. Melanosomes are found in specialized pigment cells called melanocytes, but may also be engulfed by other cells, which are then called melanophages. Hair acquires pigment from melanocytes in the root bulb, which deposit melanosomes into the growing hair structure. A critical step in the production of melanins is the catalysis of tyrosine by an enzyme called tyrosinase, producing dopaquinone. Dopaquinone may become eumelanin, or phaeomelanin. Eumelanin, meaning true black, is a dense compound that absorbs most wavelengths of light, and appears black or brown as a result. Phaeomelanin, meaning rufous-black, is characterized by the presence of sulfur-containing cysteine, and it appears reddish to yellowish as a result. Melanosomes containing eumelanin are eumelanosomes, while those containing phaeomelanin are phaeomelanosomes. Melanocyte-stimulating hormone (MSH) binds to the Melanocortin 1 receptor (MC1R) and commits melanocytes to the production of eumelanin. In the absence of this signal, melanocytes produce phaeomelanin. Another chemical, Agouti signalling peptide (ASP), can attach itself to MC1R and interfere with MSH/MC1R signalling. In many mammals, variation in the level of ASP switches melanocytes between eumelanin and phaeomelanin production, resulting in coloured patterns.

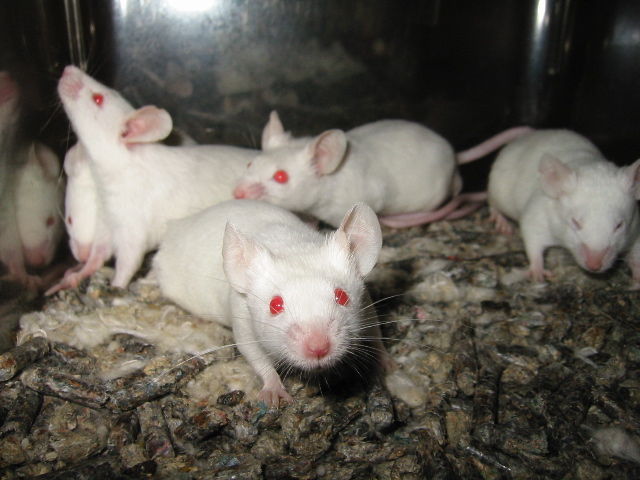
Amelanistic laboratory mice, such as these, have no pigment in their skin, hair, or eyes. Their eyes are reddish.

Melanocytes, and the parallel melanophores found in fishes, amphibians, and reptiles, are derived from a strip of tissue in the embryo called the neural crest. Stem cells in the neural crest give rise to the cells of the autonomic nervous system, supportive elements of the skeleton such as chondrocytes, cells of the endocrine system, and melanocytes. This strip of tissue is found along the dorsal midline of the embryo, and multipotent cells migrate down along the sides of the embryo, or through germ layers, to their ultimate destinations. Melanocyte stem cells are called melanoblasts. Conditions associated with abnormalities in the migration of melanoblasts are known collectively as piebaldism. Pigment cells of the iris pigment epithelium have a separate embryological origin. Piebaldism and amelanism are distinct conditions.

== In mammals ==
The only pigments that mammals produce are melanins. For a mammal to be unable to chemically manufacture melanin renders it completely pigmentless. This condition is more commonly called albinism. Amelanistic mammals have white hair, pink skin, and eyes that have a pink, red, or violet appearance. Reddish eyes are due to the lack of pigment in the iris pigment epithelium. When the stroma is unpigmented but the iris pigment epithelium is not, mammalian eyes appear blue. Melanin in the pigment epithelium is critical for visual acuity and contrast.

Loss of melanogenesis function is linked to the gene that encodes tyrosinase. Certain alleles of this gene, TYR, at the Color locus, cause oculocutaneous albinism type 1 in humans and the familiar red-eyed albino conditions in mice and other mammals.

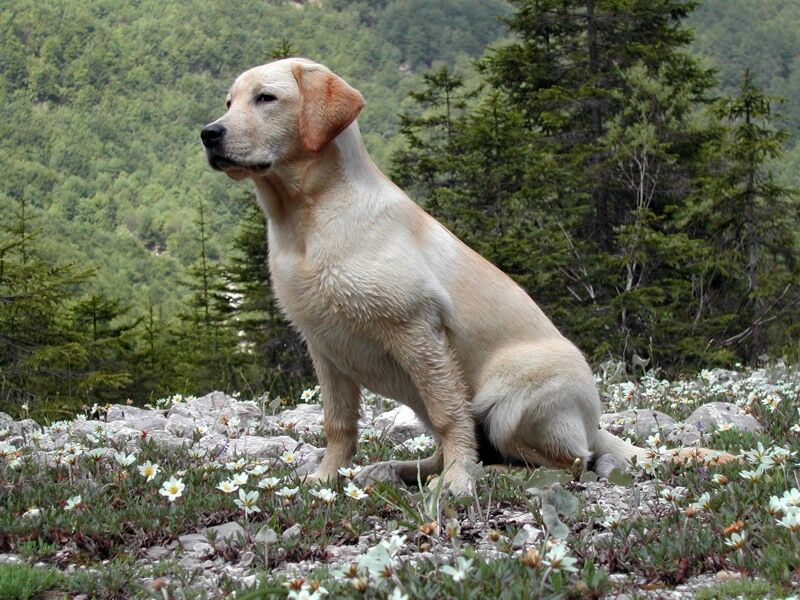
Without melanocortin 1 receptor to signal eumelanin production in melanocytes, this Labrador retriever has a yellow coat. His eyes and skin are normal.

== In other vertebrates ==
Other vertebrates, such as fishes, amphibians, reptiles and birds, produce a variety of non-melanin pigments. Disruption of melanin production does not affect the production of these pigments. Non-melanin pigments in other vertebrates are produced by cells called chromatophores. Within this categorization, xanthophores are cells that contain primarily yellowish pteridines, while erythrophores contain primarily orangish carotenoids. Some species also possess iridophores or leucophores, which do not contain true pigments, but light-reflective structures that give iridescence. An extremely uncommon type of chromatophore, the cyanophore, produces a very vivid blue pigment. Amelanism in fishes, amphibians, reptiles and birds has the same genetic etiology as in mammals: loss of tyrosinase function. However, due to the presence of other pigments, other amelanistic vertebrates are seldom white and red-eyed like amelanistic mammals.

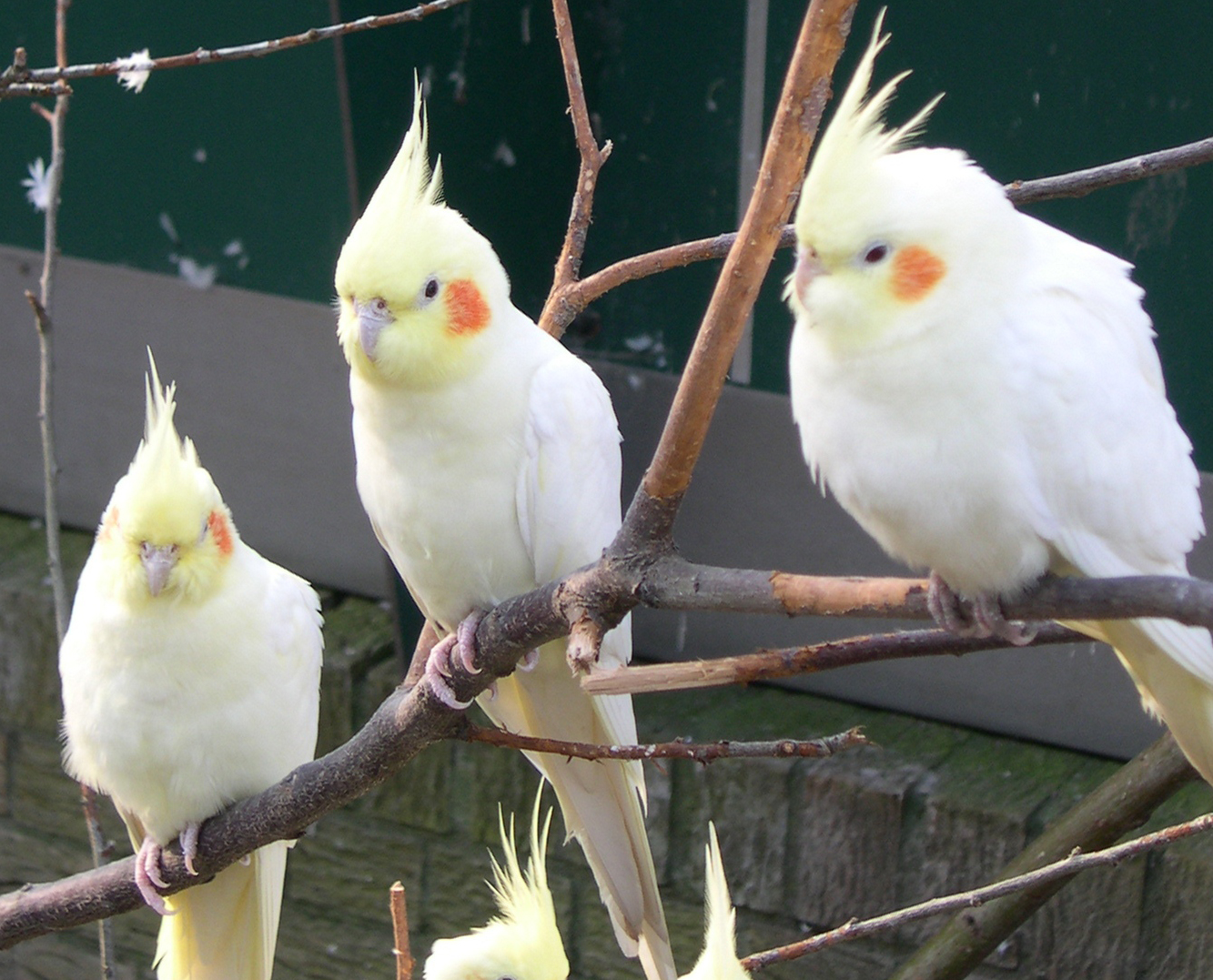
Amelanistic ("lutino") cockatiels retain their carotenoid-based red and yellow pigments.

== Aeumelanism ==
Melanocytes depend on the Melanocortin 1 receptor (MC1R) to signal the production of eumelanin. Loss of melanocortin 1 receptor function or high activity of the MC1R-antagonist, Agouti signalling peptide, can cause the widespread absence of eumelanin. Loss of MC1R function, a recessive trait, has been observed in many species. In humans, various mutations of the MC1R gene result in red hair, blond hair, fair skin, and susceptibility to sundamaged skin and melanoma. Aeumelanic hair coats, associated with mutations of the MC1R gene, have also been identified in mice, cattle, dogs, and horses. These coat colors are called "yellow" in mice and dogs, "red" in cattle and chestnut in horses. The loss of eumelanin in the coat is, in these species, harmless. The distinction between aeumelanism and hyperphaeomelanism – over abundance of phaeomelanin – is semantic.

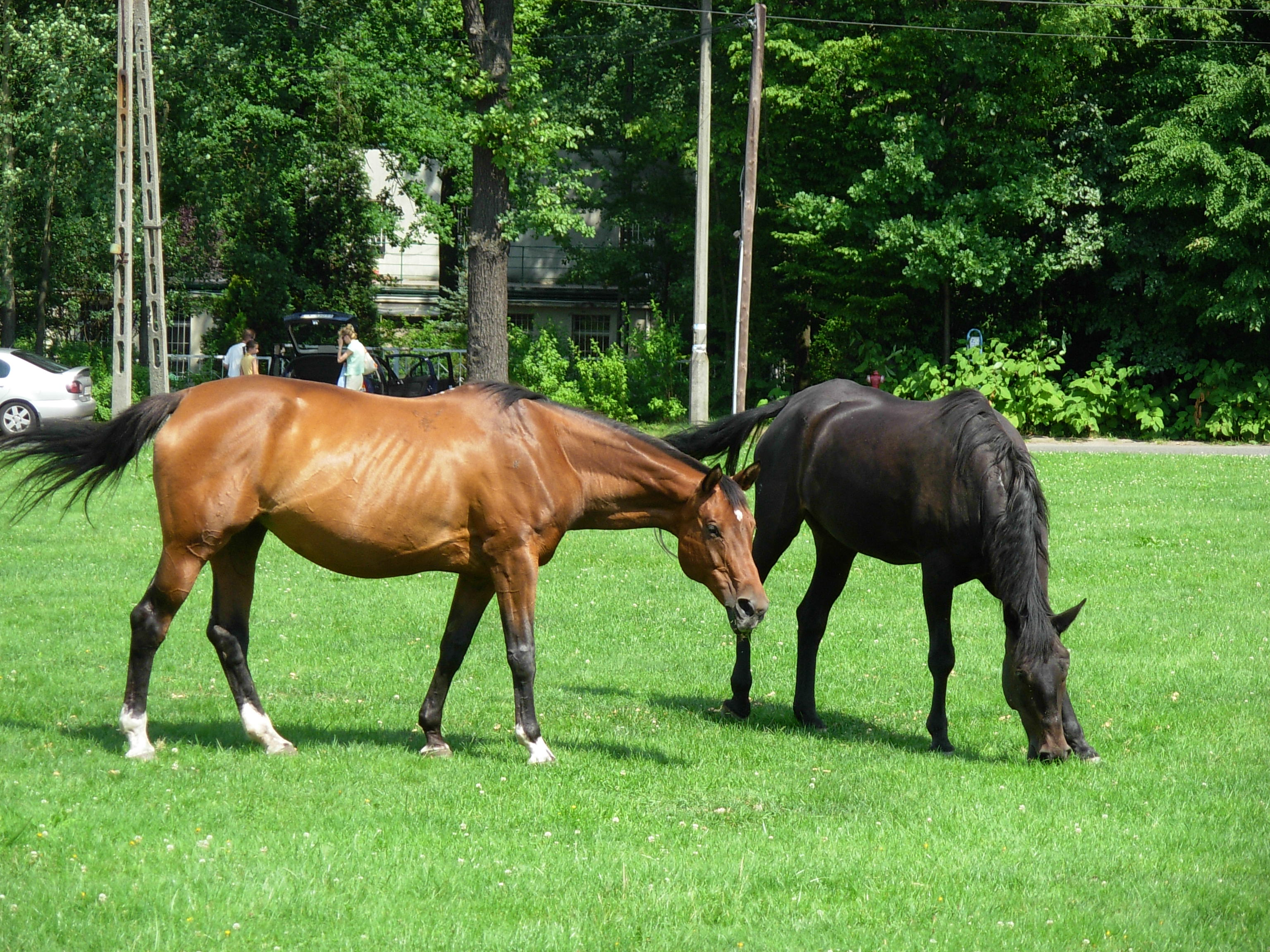
The bay horse, left, has both eumelanin and phaeomelanin in her coat; the agouti signaling peptide suppresses black color to the "points" v the mane, tail, ear tips, and legs. The horse at right lacks the agouti signalling protein, and has a uniformly black or aphaeomelanistic coat. In a chestnut horse, the solid red coat is created by a recessive aeumelanic mutation in MC1R and agouti, if present, is masked. In all cases, the eyes and skin are unaffected.

== Aphaeomelanism ==
Aphaeomelanism is the abnormal absence of phaeomelanin from the integumentary system and/or eyes. Phaeomelanin is produced by melanocytes in the absence of melanocortin 1 receptor. This absence is mediated by agouti signalling protein, which antagonizes melanocortin 1 receptor. Loss of function of agouti signalling protein can permit unmediated eumelanin production, producing a uniformly black-to-brown coat color. This condition can be observed in dogs, cats, and horses. The appearance of mammals with recessive agouti mutations is typically dense black. As with aeumelanism, the difference between lack of phaeomelanin and abundance of eumelanin is one of words. Some agouti alleles in mice are associated with health defects, but this is not the case in dogs, cats, or horses.

== See also ==
- Albinism
- Dyschromia
- Erythrism
- Heterochromia iridum
- Leucism
- Melanism
- Piebaldism
- Vitiligo
- Xanthochromism
