= Piebald (disambiguation) =

Piebald refers to an animal coloring that is spotted.

Piebald may also refer to:

- Piebald (band), an American alternative rock band
- Piebaldism, a pigmentation disorder in humans
