= Dyschromia =

- Specialty: Dermatology

Dyschromia refers to an alteration of the color of the skin or nails.

Hyperchromia can refer to hyperpigmentation, and hypochromia can refer to hypopigmentation.

Dyschromatoses involve both hyperpigmented and hypopigmented macules.

== See also ==
- Albinism
- Albino and white squirrels
- Amelanism
- Chimera (genetics)
- Coloboma
- Erythrism
- Heterochromia iridum
- Leucism
- Melanism
- Piebaldism
- Vitiligo
- Xanthochromism
