= Erythrism =

Unusual reddish pigmentation in animals

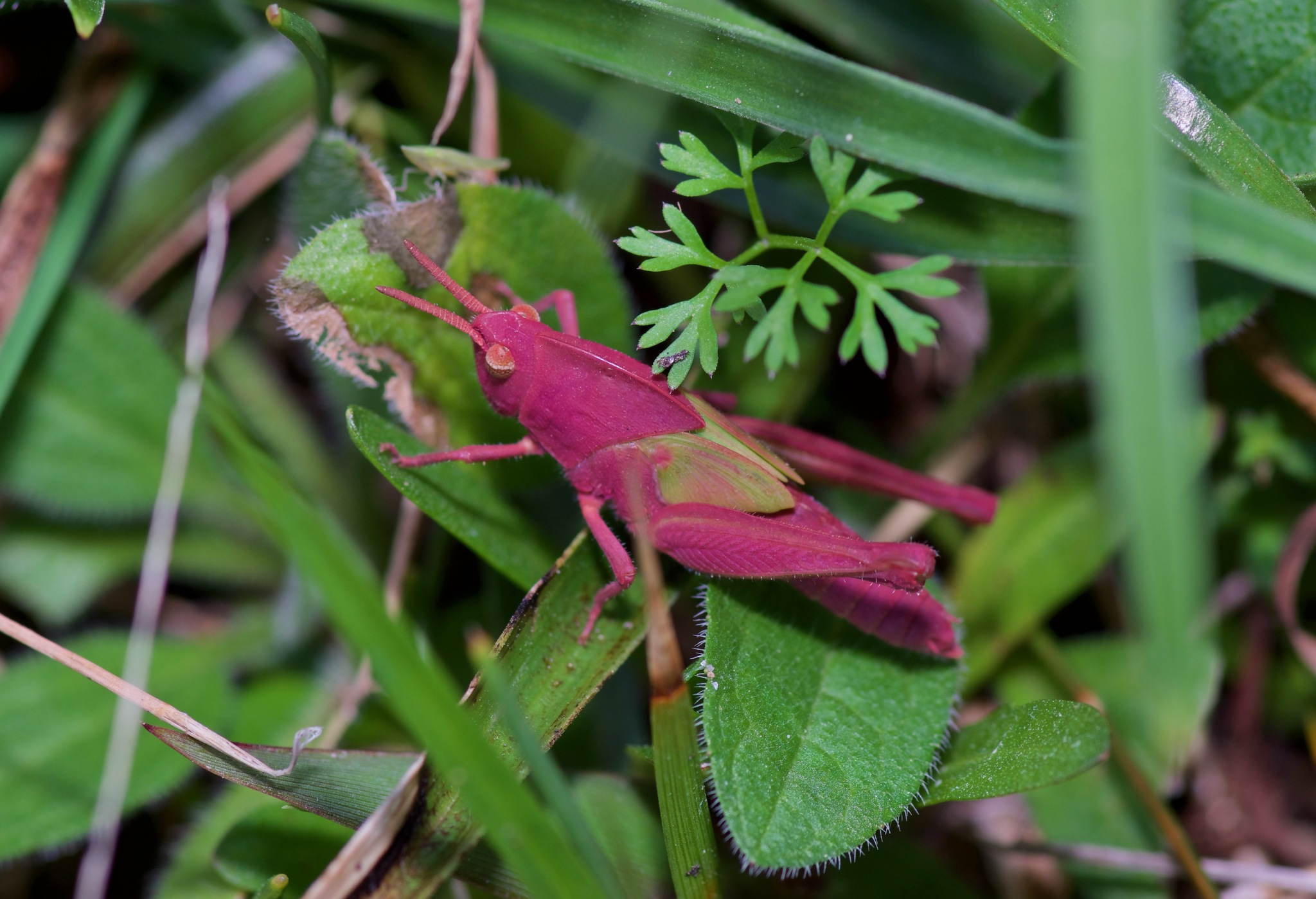
This green-striped grasshopper is not very green due to erythrism.

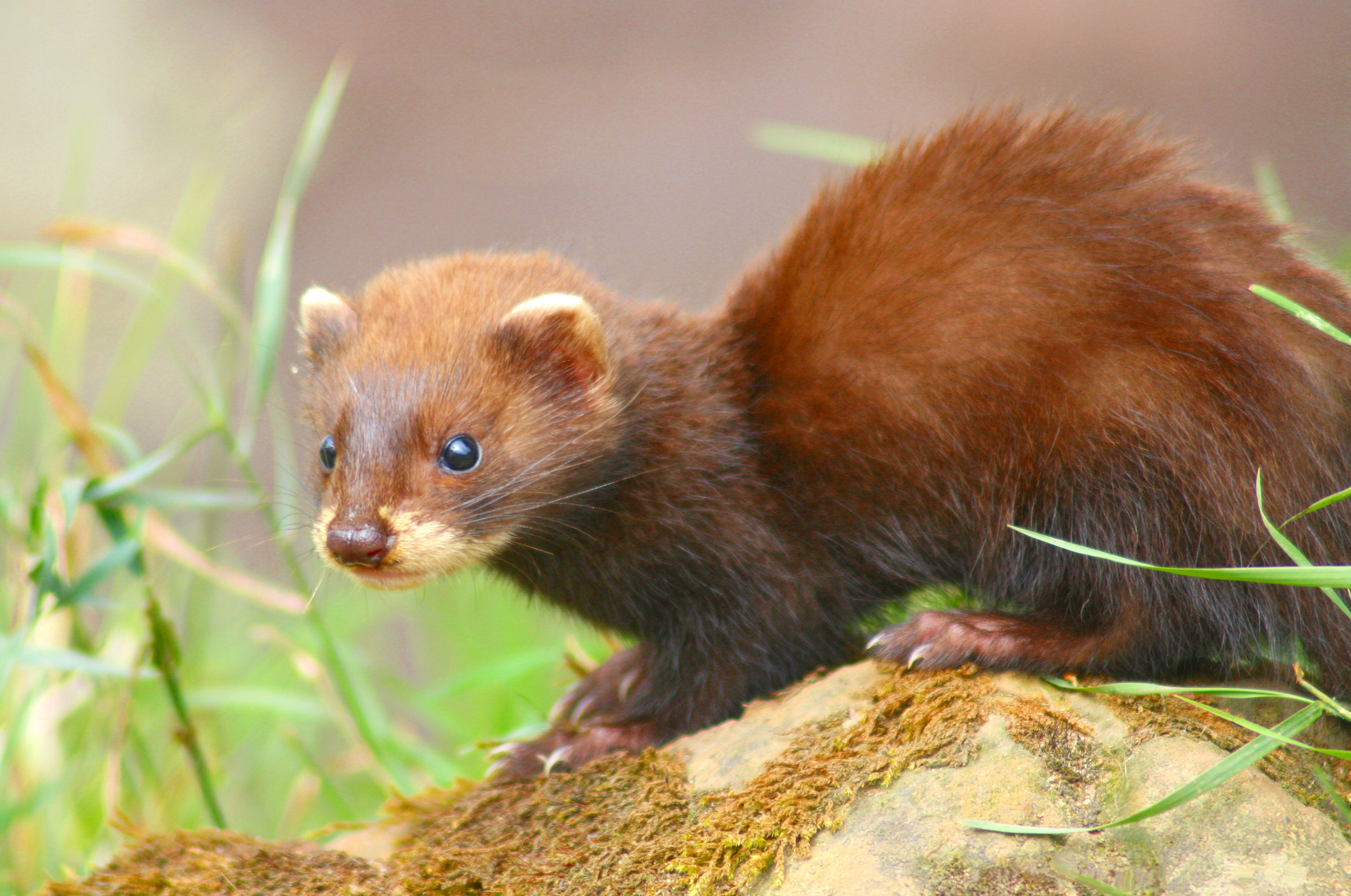
An erythristic Welsh polecat

Erythrism or erythrochroism refers to an unusual reddish pigmentation of an animal's hair, skin, feathers, or eggshells.

Causes of erythrism include:

- Genetic mutations which cause an absence of a normal pigment and/or excessive production of others
- Diet, as in bees feeding on "bright red corn syrup" used in maraschino cherry manufacturing.

Erythrism in katydids has been occasionally observed. The coloring might be a camouflage that helps some members of the species survive on red plants. There is also consensus that the erythristic mutation is actually a dominant trait among katydid species, albeit a disadvantageous one, due to the overwhelmingly green coloration of most foliage. Hence, most pink or otherwise vividly colored katydids do not survive to adulthood, and this observation explains their rarity. Erythrism in leopards is rare, but one study reported that two of twenty-eight leopards seen in camera traps in a South African nature reserve were erythristic, and the authors found records of five other "strawberry" leopards from the region.

== Bird's eggs ==
Common guillemots lay eggs with highly variable egg colors, including rare red eggs, which are estimated by Tim Birkhead to be at a frequency of 1 in 1,000 to 1 in 10,000 eggs. The red color is thought to be due to the absence of biliverdin, and/or an excess of protoporphyrin IX. One such rare red common guillemot egg was the Metland Egg.

== Gallery ==
Erythrism in insects

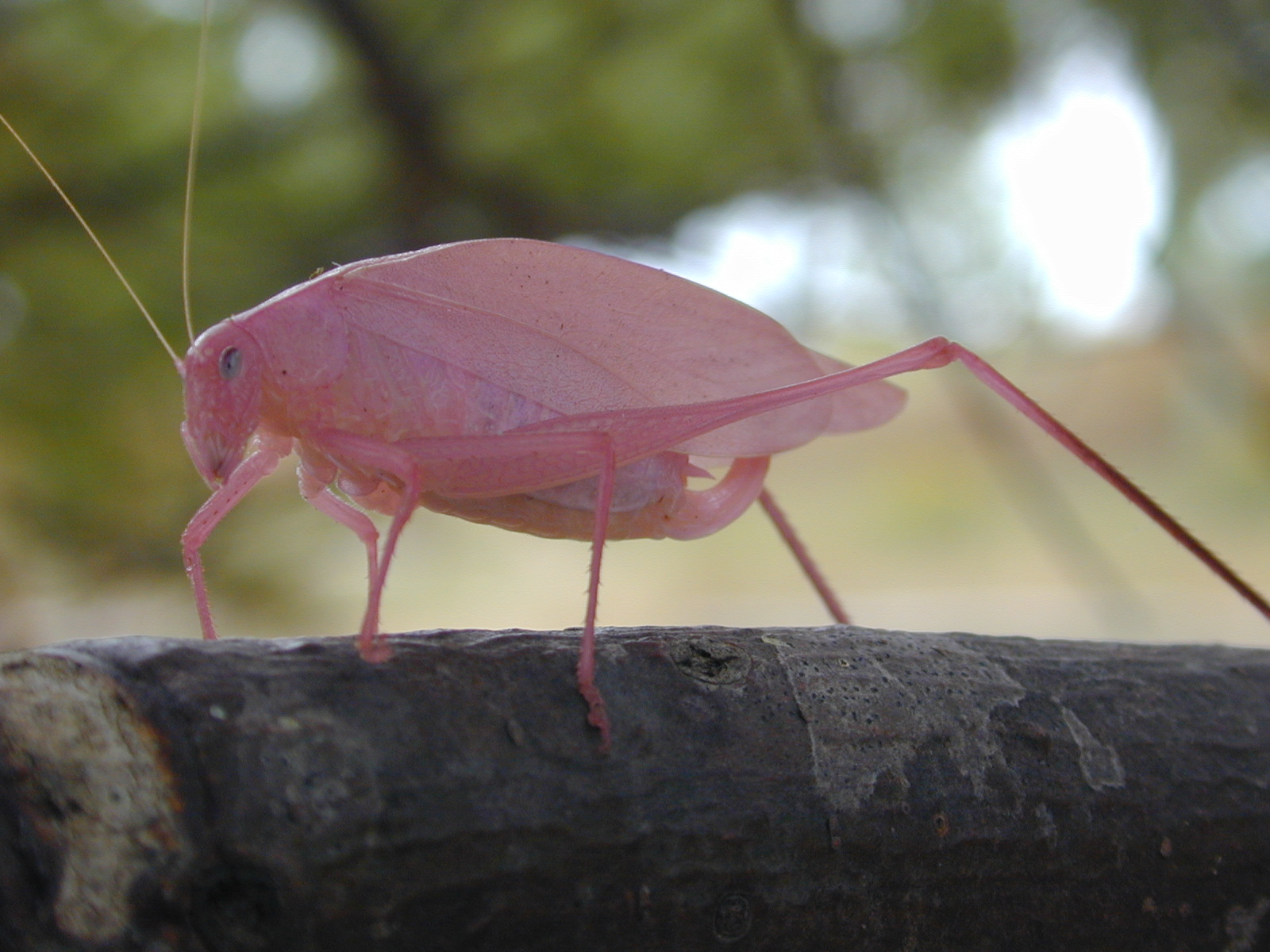

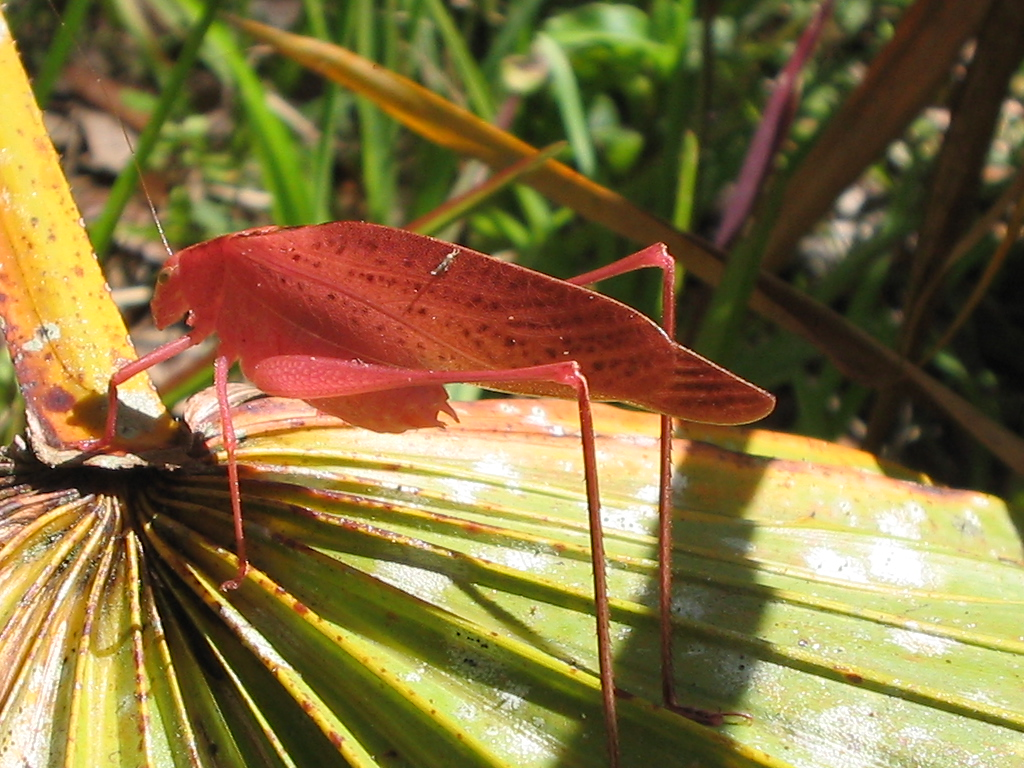

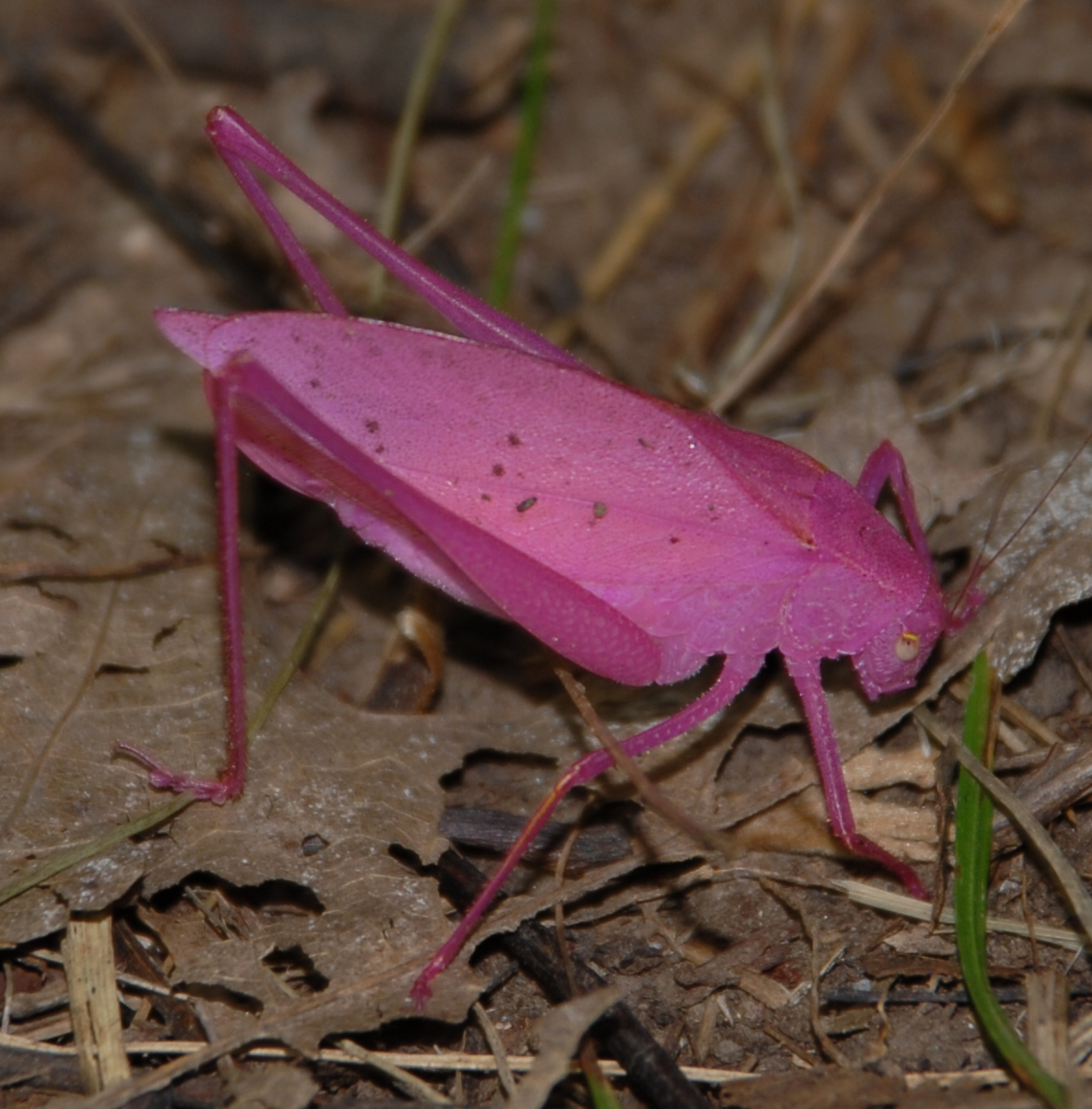

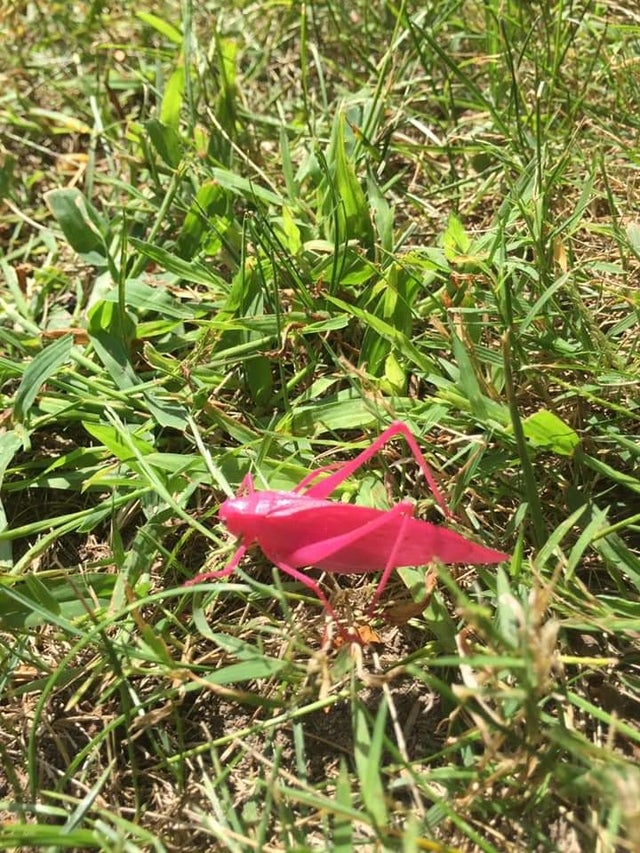

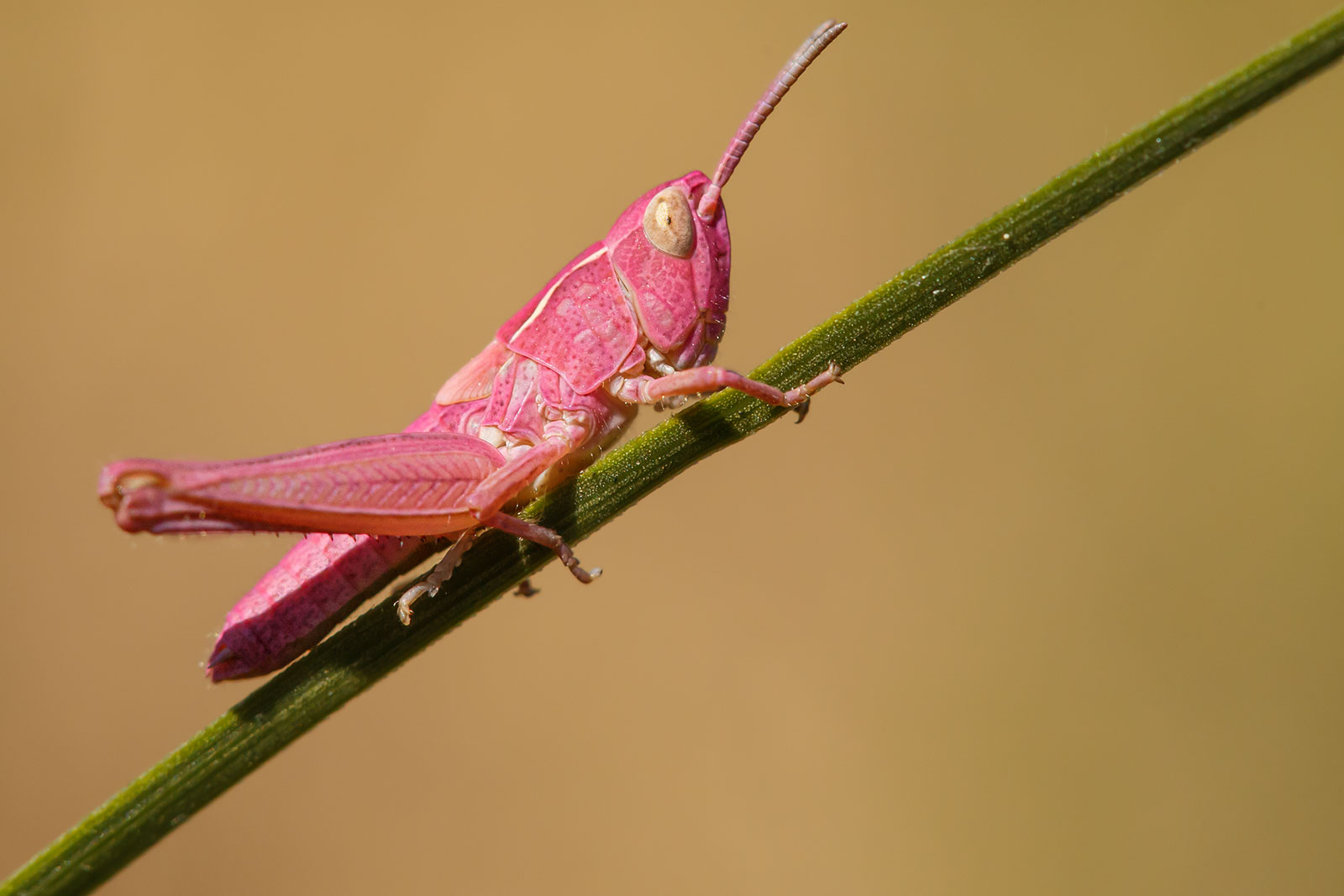

== See also ==
- Albinism
- Amelanism
- Dyschromia
- Heterochromia iridum
- Leucism
- Melanism
- Piebaldism
- Red hair
- Vitiligo
- Xanthochromism
