= Leucism =

Partial loss of pigmentation in an animal

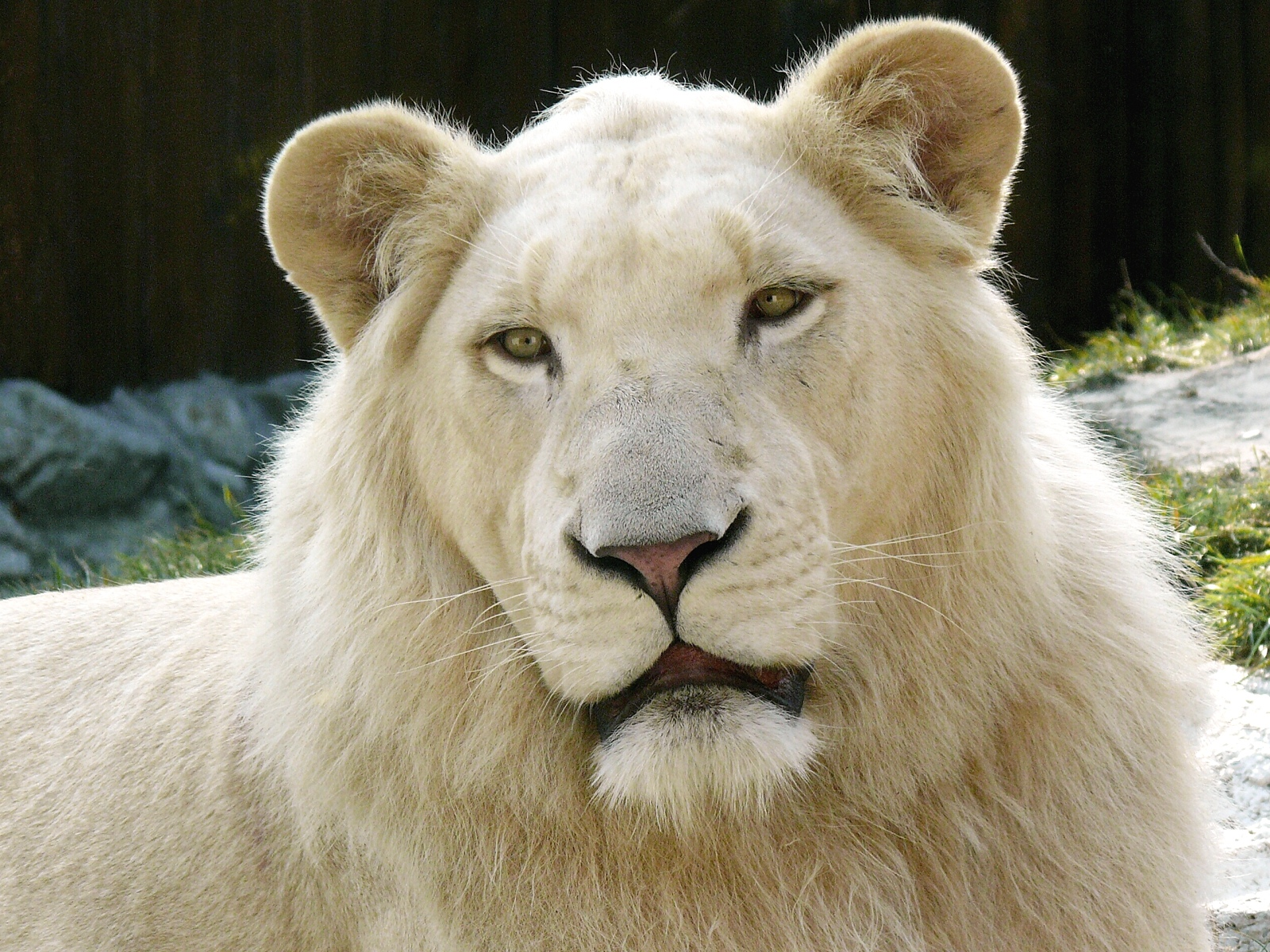
Leucistic white lions owe their colouring to a recessive allele. Note the eyes and lips remain the normal colour. Studies have shown that the reduced pigment comes from a mutation in the gene for tyrosinase, the same as causes Type I oculocutaneous albinism in humans.

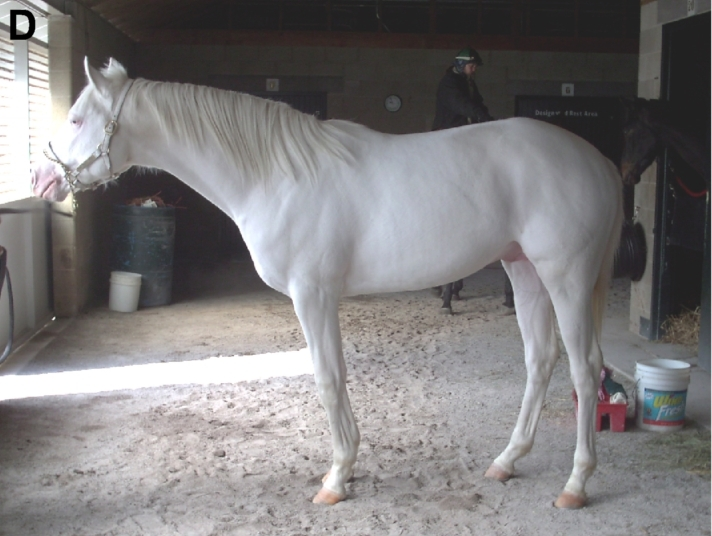
This white horse owes its coloring to a dominant allele (dominant white).

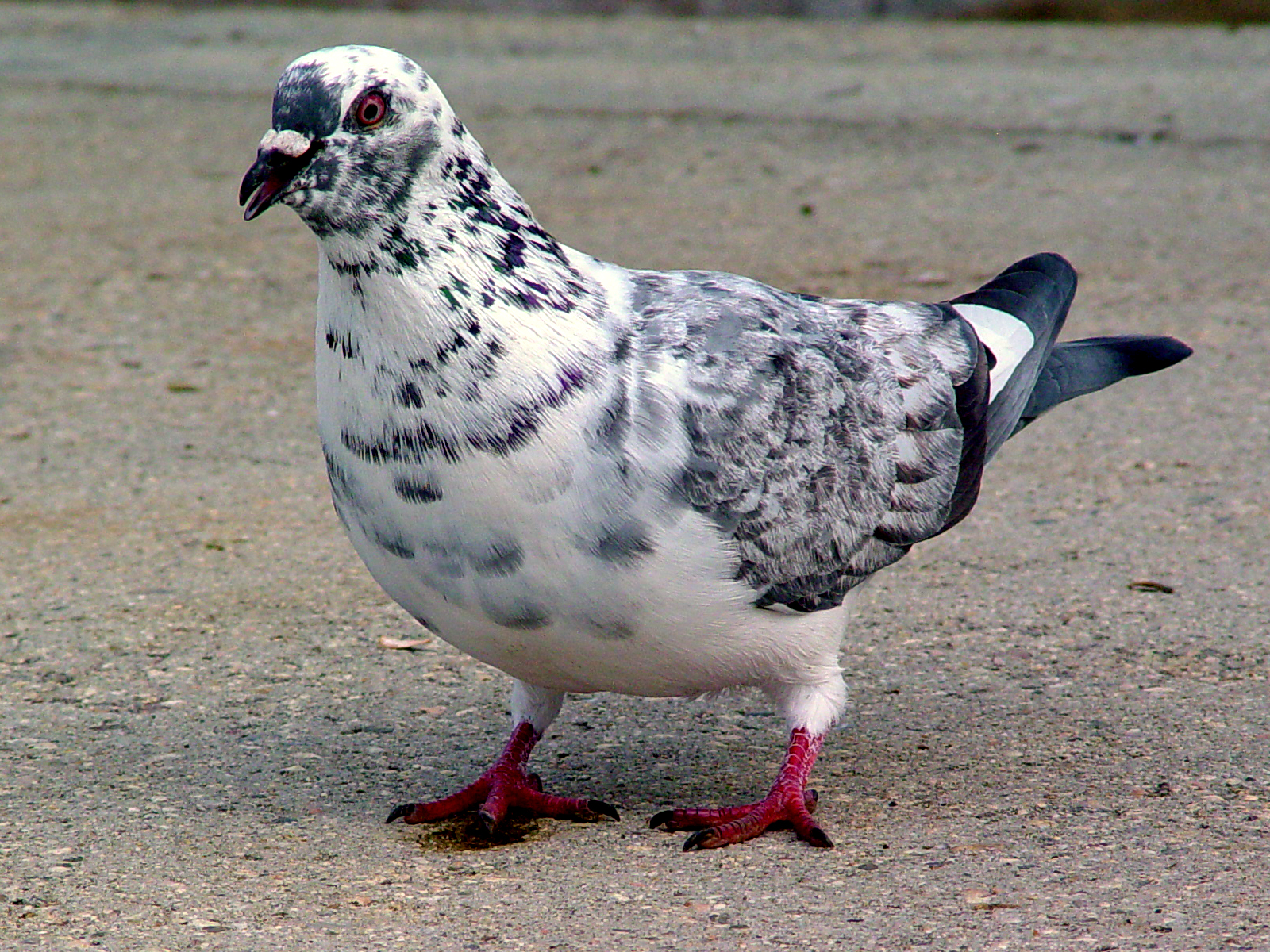
A leucistic rock dove. Both the eyes and legs are still of the normal colour.

Leucism (/ˈluːsɪzəm, -kɪz-/) or leukism, is a wide variety of conditions that result in partial loss of pigmentation in an animal—causing white, pale, or patchy coloration of the skin, hair, feathers, scales, or cuticles, but not the eyes. Some genetic conditions that result in a "leucistic" appearance include piebaldism, Waardenburg syndrome, vitiligo, Chédiak–Higashi syndrome, flavism, isabellinism, xanthochromism, axanthism, amelanism, and melanophilin mutations. Pale patches of skin, feathers, or fur (often referred to as "depigmentation") can also result from injury.

== Details ==
(video) A white tiger at Tobu Zoo, in Saitama, Japan. This phenotype is due to a mutation in the same gene that results in Type IV oculocutaneous albinism in humans.

Leucism is often used to describe the phenotype that results from defects in pigment cell differentiation and/or migration from the neural crest to skin, hair, or feathers during development. This results in either the entire surface (if all pigment cells fail to develop) or patches of body surface (if only a subset are defective) lacking cells that can make pigment.

Since all pigment cell-types differentiate from the same multipotent precursor cell-type, leucism can cause a reduction in all types of pigment. This is in contrast to albinism, for which leucism is often mistaken. Albinism results in the reduction of melanin production only, though the melanocyte (or melanophore) is still present. Thus in species that have other pigment cell-types, for example xanthophores, albinos are not entirely white, but instead display a pale yellow color.

More common than a complete absence of pigment cells is localized or incomplete hypopigmentation, resulting in irregular patches of white on an animal that otherwise has normal coloring and patterning. This partial leucism is known as a "pied" or "piebald" effect; and the ratio of white to normal-colured skin can vary considerably not only between generations, but between different offspring from the same parents, and even between members of the same litter. This is notable in horses, cows, cats, dogs, the urban crow, and the ball python but is also found in many other species.

Due to the lack of melanin production in both the retinal pigmented epithelium (RPE) and iris, those affected by albinism sometimes have pink pupils due to the underlying blood vessels showing through. However, this is not always the case and many albino animals do not have pink pupils. The common belief that all albinos have pink pupils results in many albinos being incorrectly labeled as 'leucistic'. The neural crest disorders that cause leucism do not result in pink pupils and therefore most leucistic animals have normally colored eyes. This is because the melanocytes of the RPE do not derive from the neural crest. Instead, an out-pouching of the neural tube generates the optic cup that, in turn, forms the retina. As these cells are from an independent developmental origin, they are typically unaffected by the genetic cause of leucism.

=== Notable examples ===
- Platypus (Ornithorhynchus anatinus) – in 2021, a leucistic example was found in the Gwydir River, near Armidale, New South Wales, Australia.
- The Anchorage White Raven – a leucistic common raven known for its "trickster" behavior, spotted in 2023 and 2024 in Anchorage, Alaska.

== Genetics ==
Genes that, when mutated, can cause leucism include c-kit, mitf and EDNRB.

== Etymology ==
The terms leucistic and leucism are derived from the stem leuc- + -ism, from Latin leuco- in turn derived from Greek λευκός (leukós) meaning white.

== Gallery ==
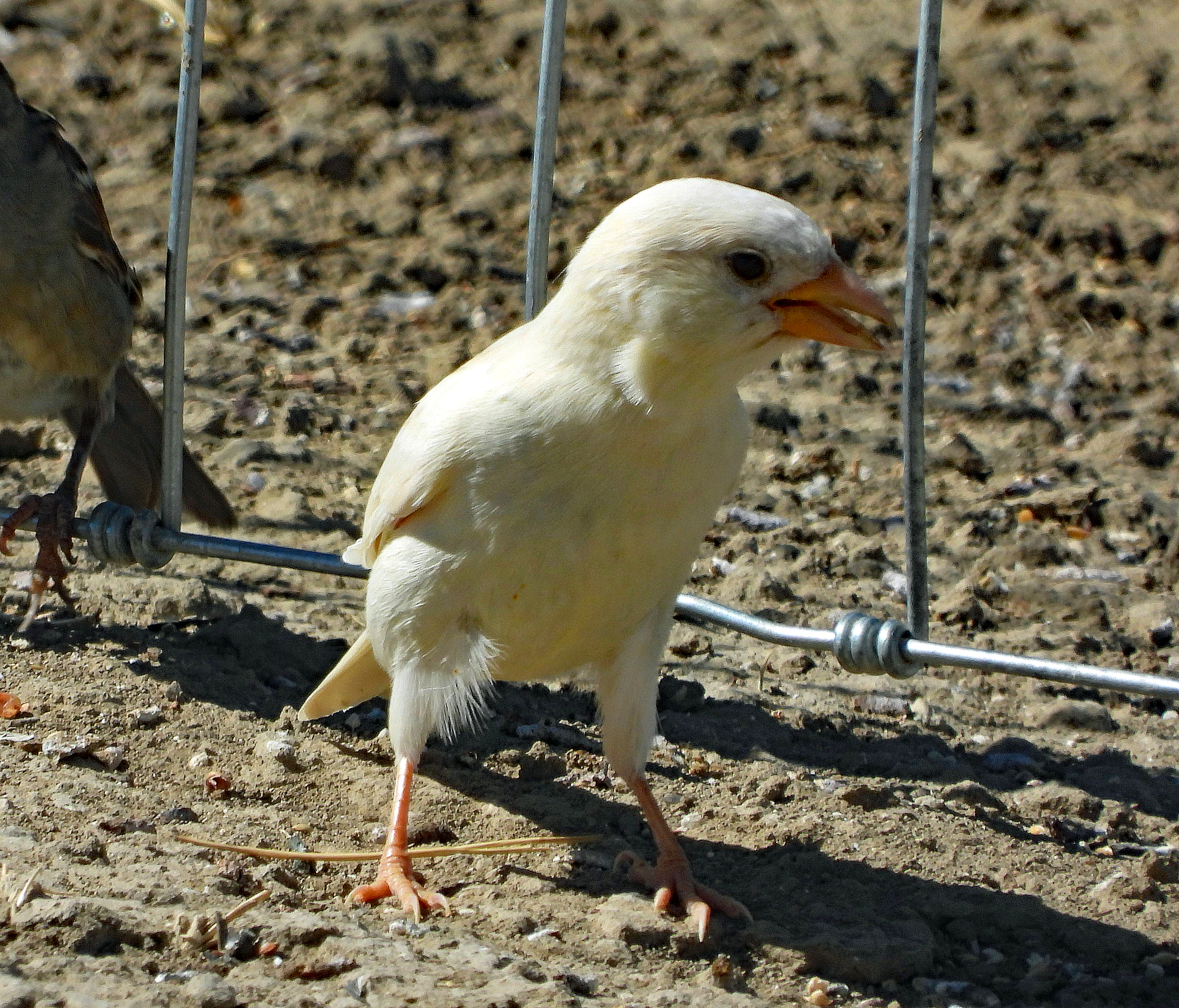
A leucistic house sparrow (Passer domesticus) in Kaycee, Wyoming, USA

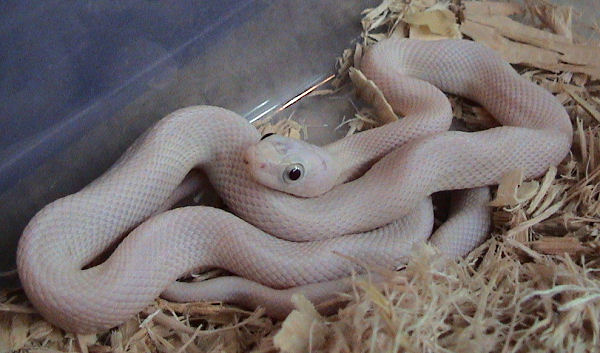
Leucistic Texas rat snake (Pantherophis obsoletus)

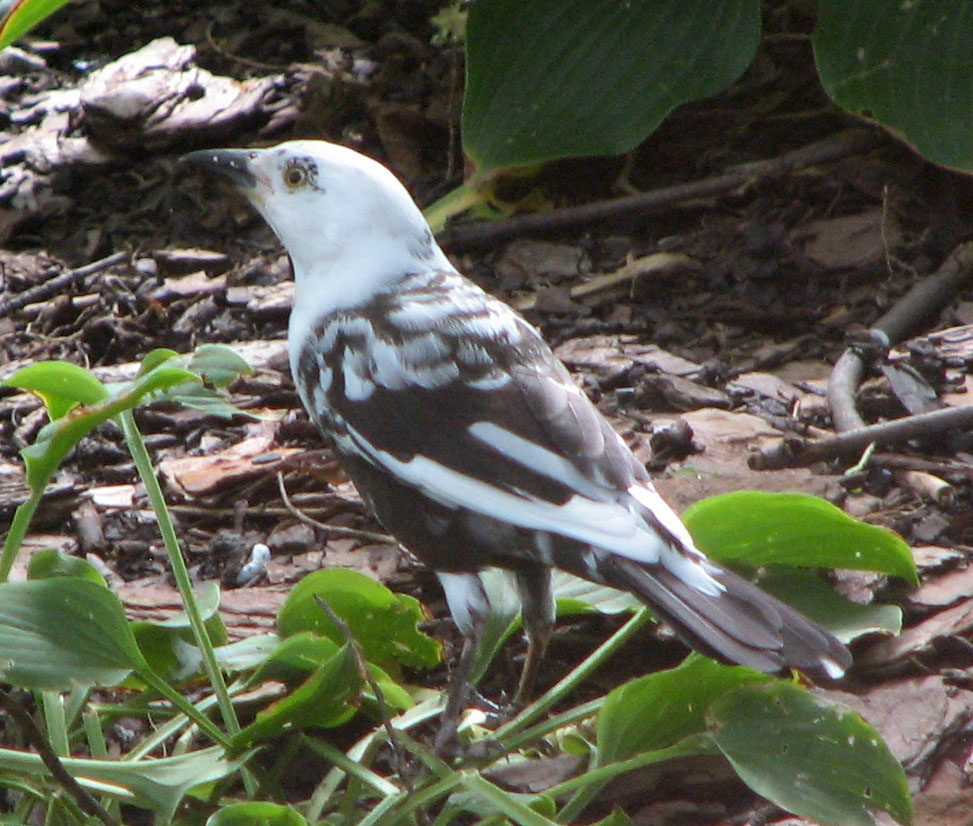
Leucistic common grackle (Quiscalus quiscula)

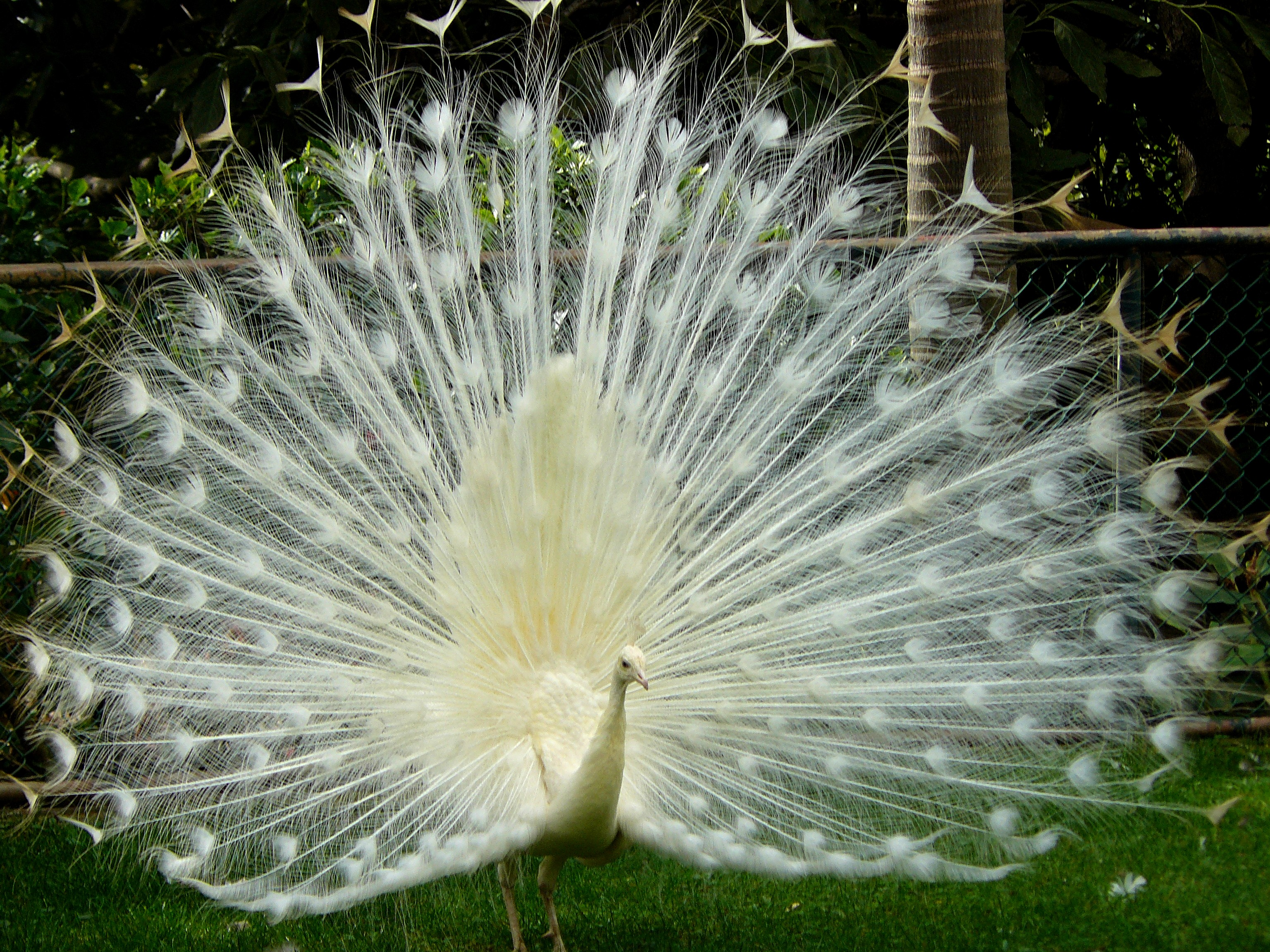
Leucistic Indian peacock (Pavo cristatus)

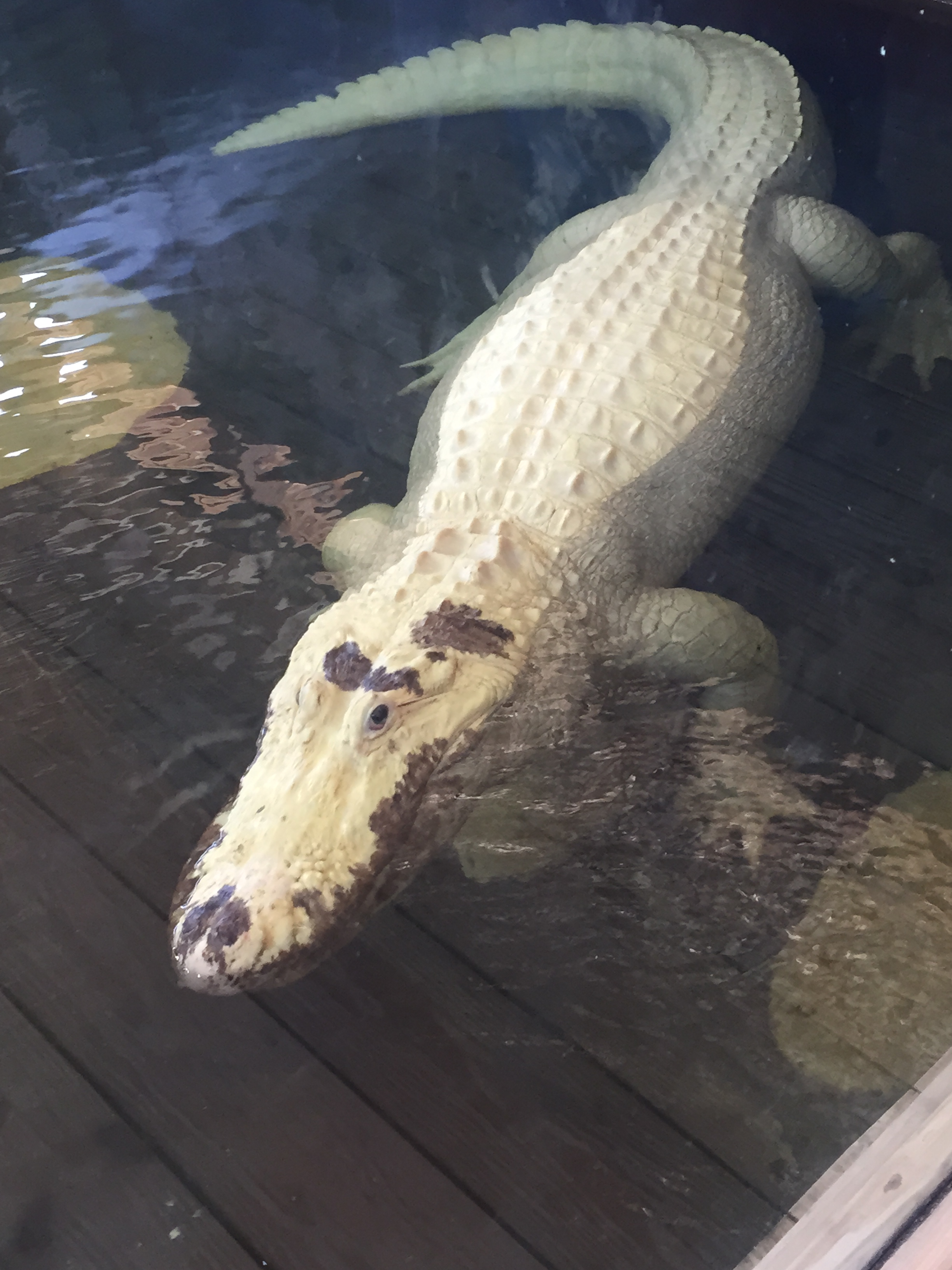
Leucistic American alligator (Alligator mississippiensis)

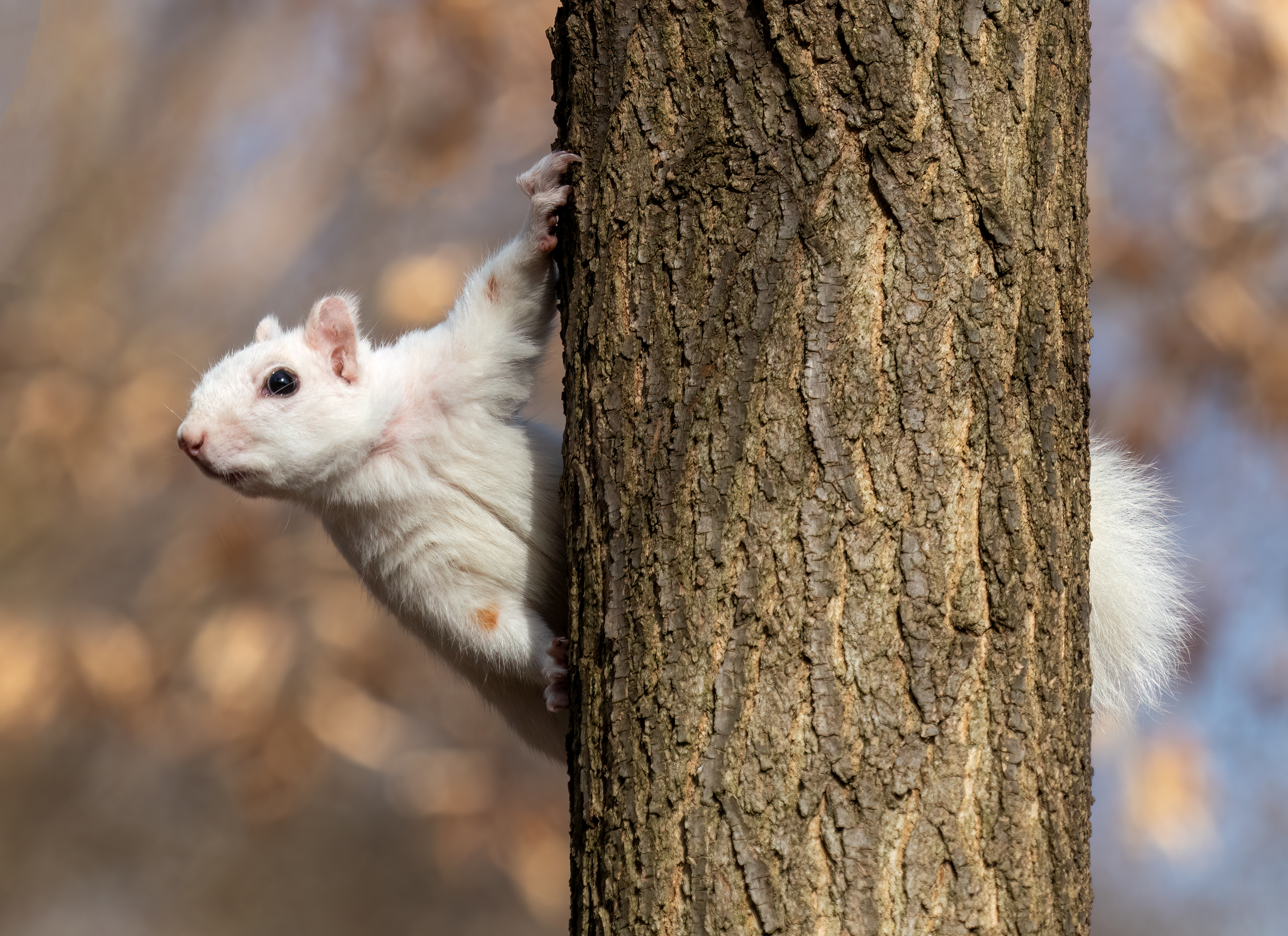
Leucistic eastern grey squirrel (Sciurus carolinensis)

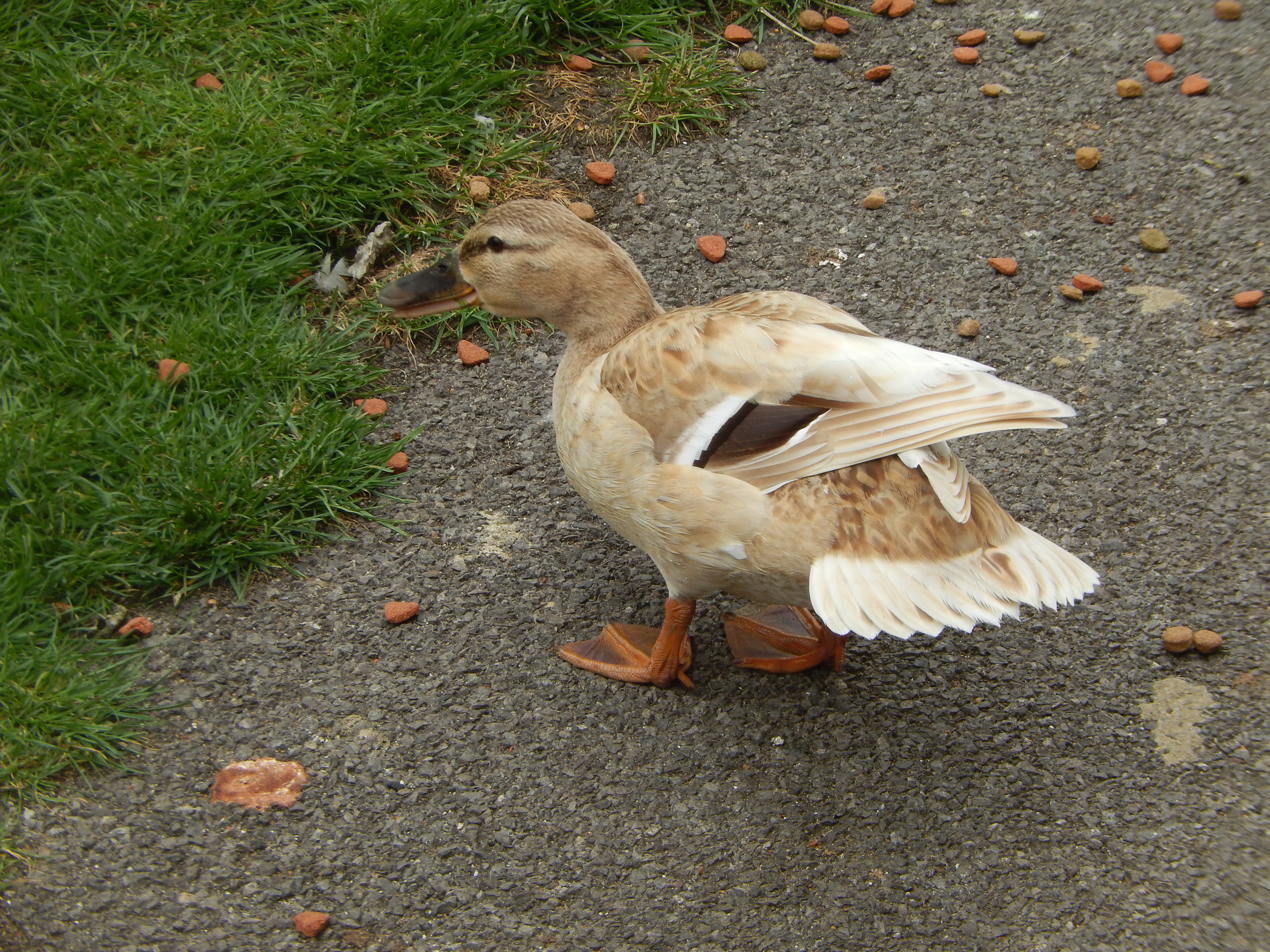
Leucistic female mallard (Anas platyrhynchos)

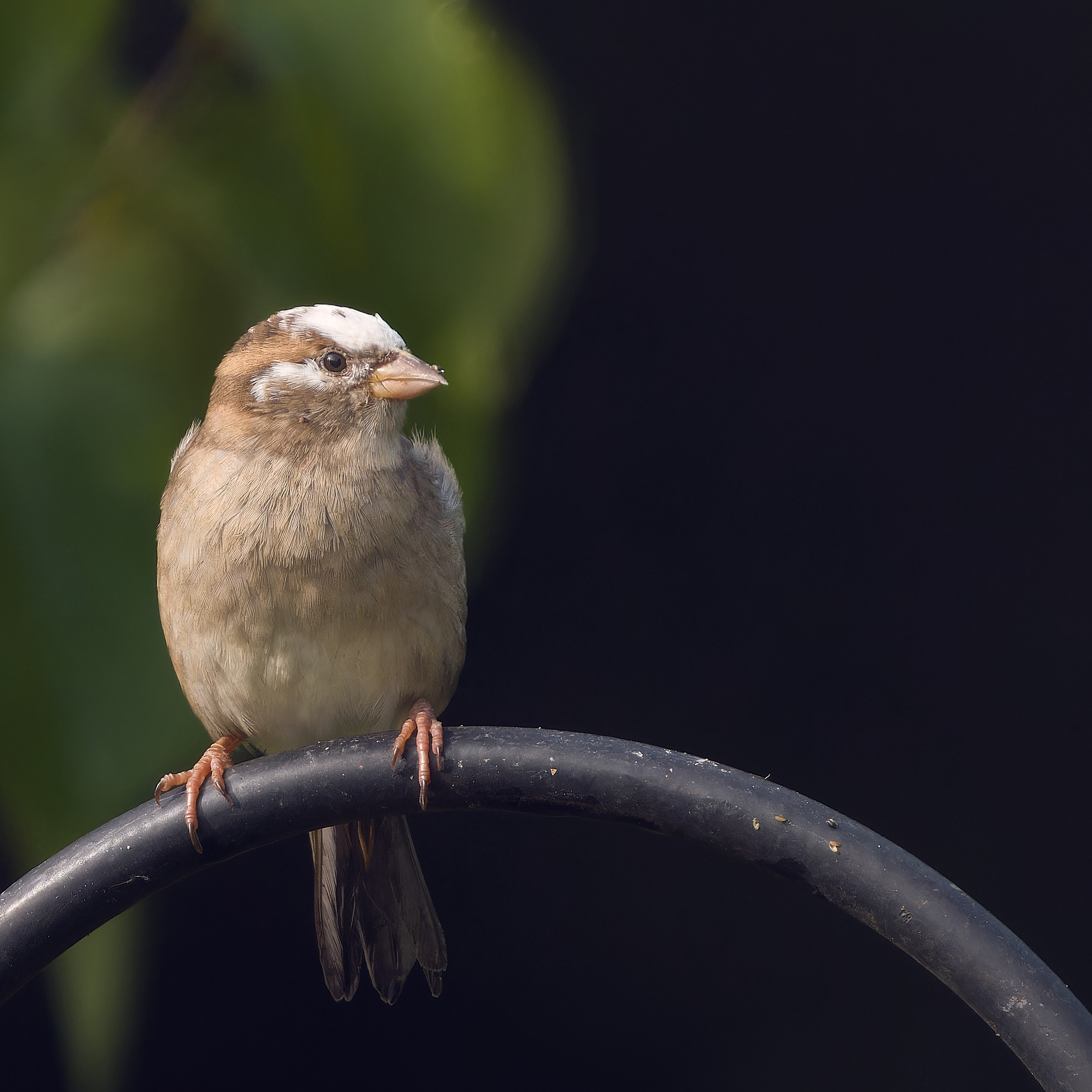
Female house sparrow (Passer domesticus) with incomplete leucism

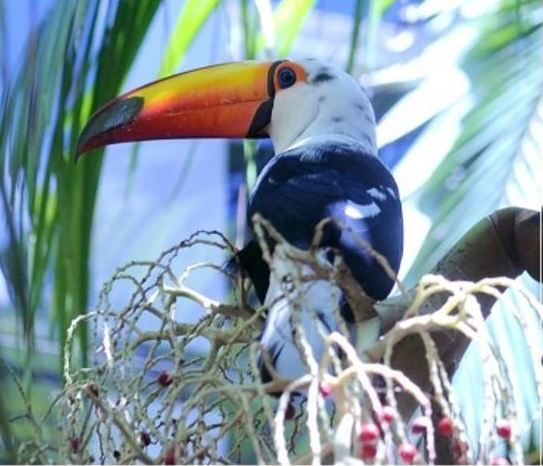
Toco toucan (Ramphastos toco) with partial leucism

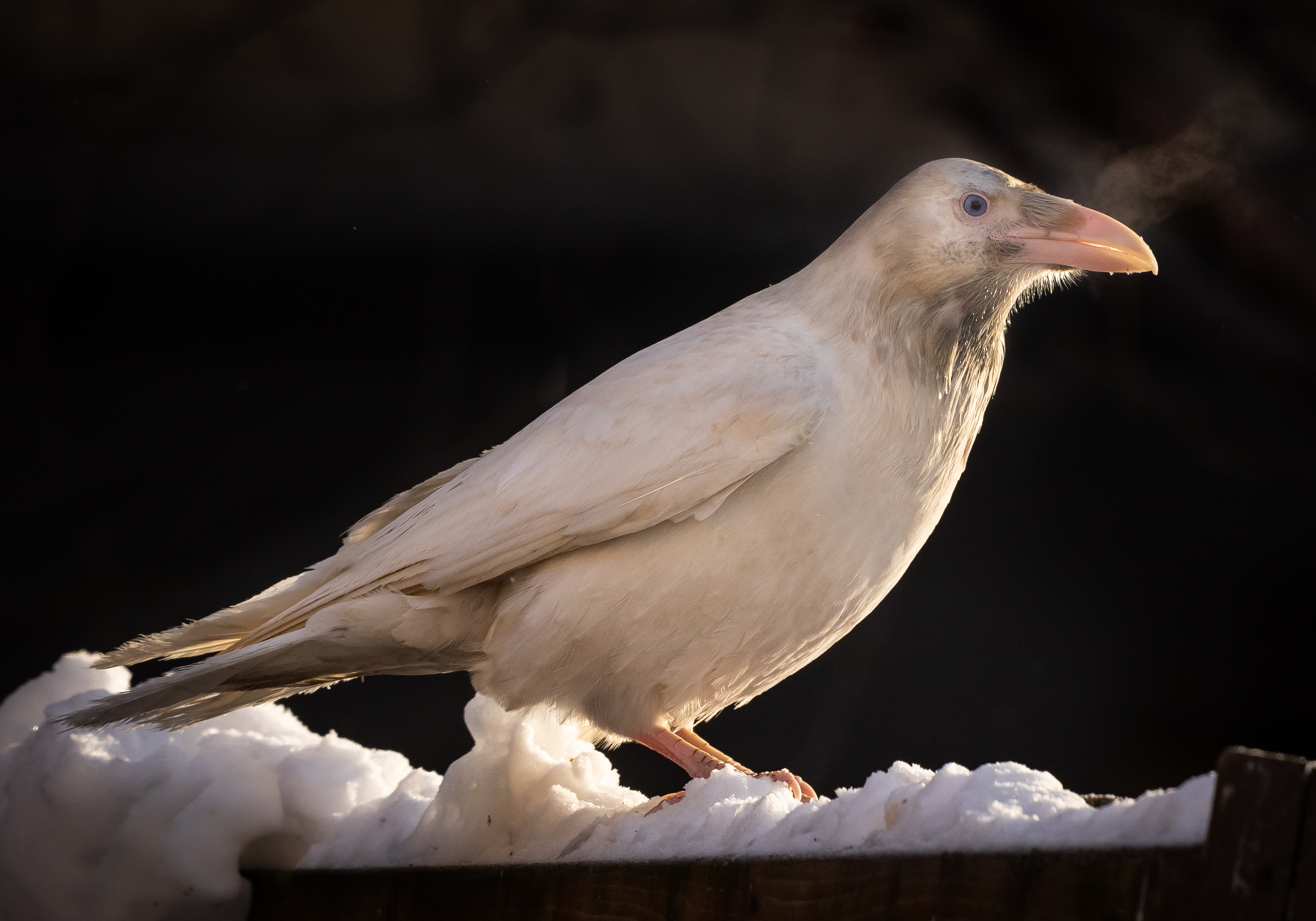
The Anchorage White Raven, a common raven (Corvus corax)

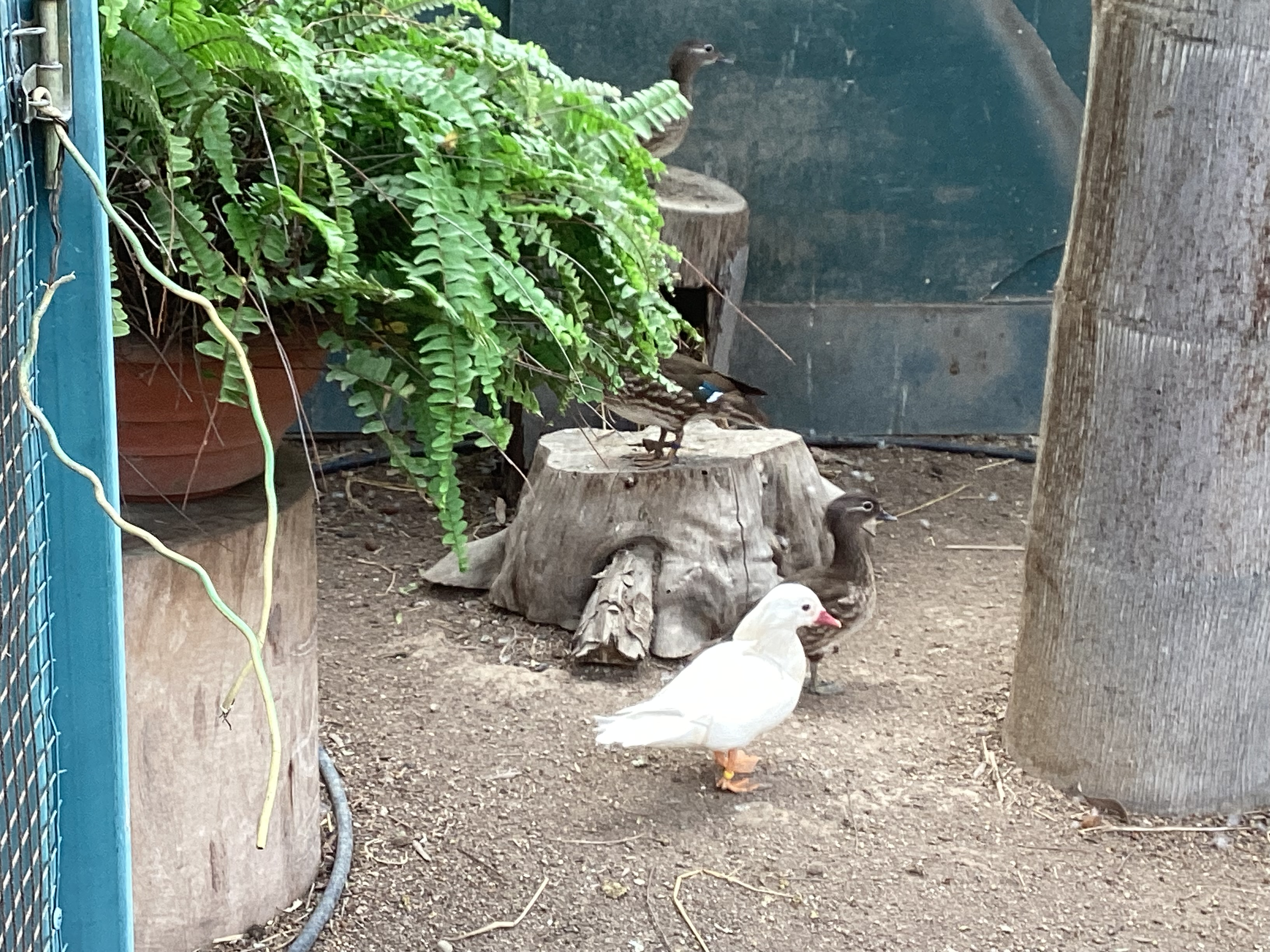
Male Mandarin duck (Aix galericulata) (front)

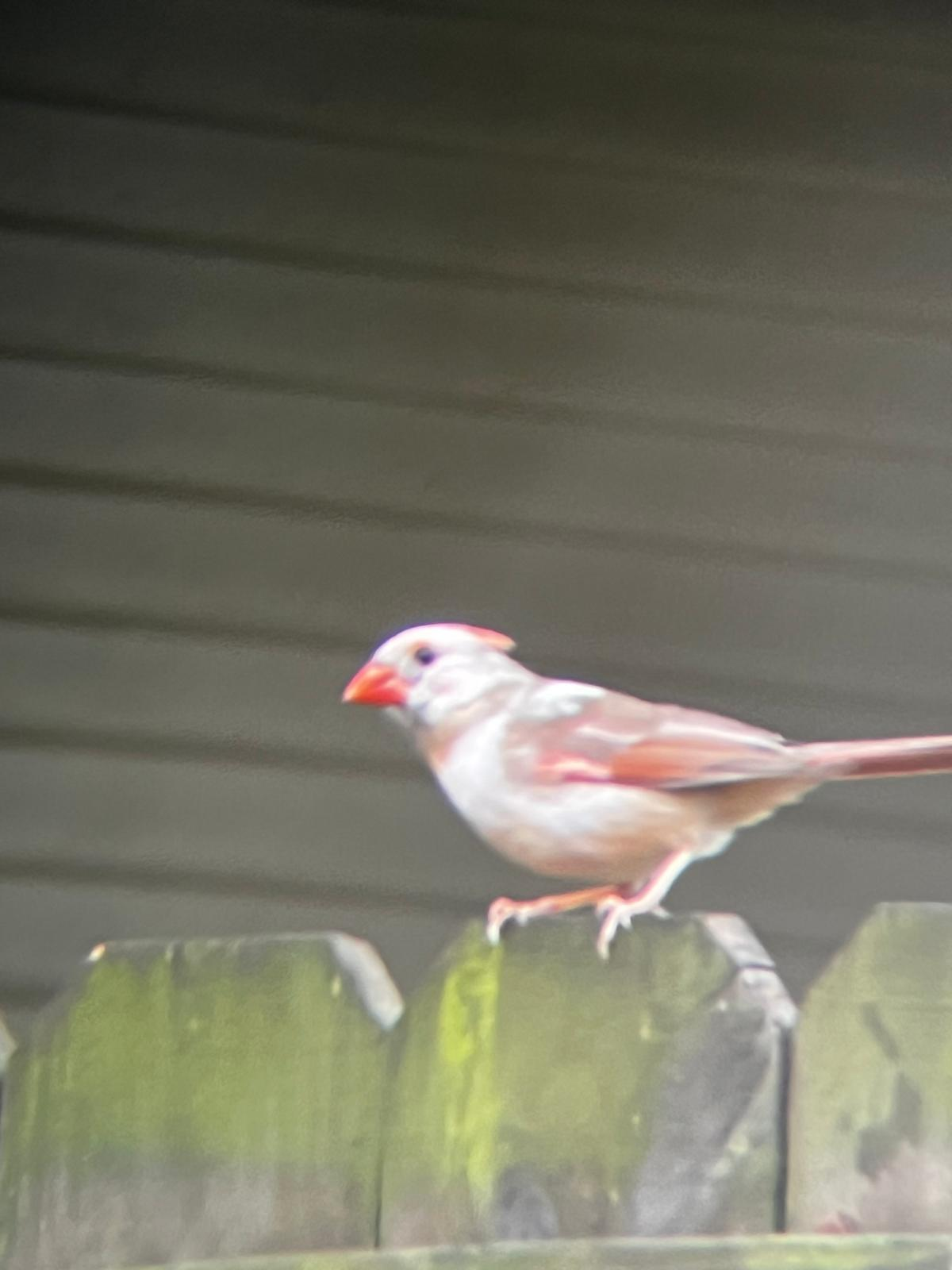
Northern Cardinal (Cardinalis Cardinalis) with partial leucism

== See also ==
- Albinism
- Albino and white squirrels
- Amelanism
- Dyschromia
- Erythrism
- Heterochromia iridum
- Melanism
- Piebaldism
- Vitiligo
- Xanthochromism
