= Iris pigment epithelium =

Layer of cuboidal cells

The iris pigment epithelium (IPE) is a one cell thick layer of cuboidal cells lying behind the iris. The epithelial cells are highly pigmented due to the numerous large melanosomes which pack the cytoplasm of each cell. Towards the central axis, the IPE terminates at the pupillary margin. Peripherally, the IPE is continuous with the inner, non-pigmented layer of the ciliary epithelium. The iris dilator muscle is strictly attached to the anterior side of the iris pigmented epithelium and represents the anterior continuation of the pigmented ciliary epithelium. The ciliary epithelia represent the anterior continuation of the multilayered retina, whose retinal pigmented epithelium (RPE) corresponds to the pigmented ciliary epithelium, while the multilayered sensory retina fades into the non-pigmented ciliary epithelium. Despite their very different functions and histological appearances, these regions have a common origin from the two layers of the embryological optic cup. The melanosomes of the IPE are distinctive, being larger, blacker and rounder than those in the ciliary epithelium or RPE.

== Pathology ==
The IPE is affected by glaucoma, diabetes, and iris inflammations and atrophies of various kinds, generally responding by showing patchy thinning and depigmentation. In albinism, it is fully or partially nonpigmented and translucent, which contributes to the photophobia of that condition. However, diseases specific to the IPE itself are almost non-existent, and it seems to be a highly differentiated, stable cell type that almost never gives rise to malignancies, unlike the melanocytes of the iris stroma. Reports of adenomas and adenocarcinomas of the IPE exist, but some of these are debatable.
