= Piebaldism =

Genetic pigmentation disorder of the skin and hair

- Other names: PBT
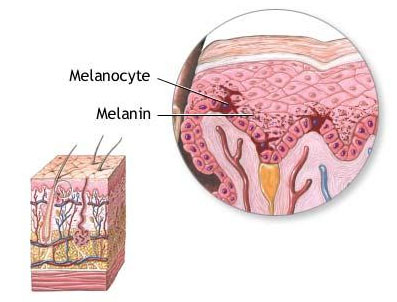
- This condition affects melanocyte development
- Specialty: Dermatology

Piebaldism refers to the absence of mature melanin-forming cells (melanocytes) in certain areas of the skin and hair. It is a rare autosomal dominant disorder of melanocyte development. Common characteristics include a congenital white forelock, scattered normal pigmented and hypopigmented macules and a triangular shaped depigmented patch on the forehead. There is nevertheless great variation in the degree and pattern of presentation, even within affected families. In some cases, piebaldism occurs together with severe developmental problems, as in Waardenburg syndrome and Hirschsprung's disease.

== Etiology ==
Piebaldism has been documented to occur in all races, and is found in nearly every species of mammal. The condition is very common in mice, rabbits, dogs, sheep, deer, cattle and horses—where selective breeding has increased the incidence of the mutation—but occurs among chimpanzees and other primates only as rarely as among humans. Piebaldism is unrelated to conditions such as vitiligo or poliosis.

Although "partial albinism" is a synonym for piebaldism, it is a fundamentally different condition from true albinism. The vision problems associated with albinism are not usually present as eye pigmentation is normal. Piebaldism differs from albinism in that the affected cells maintain the ability to produce pigment but have that specific function turned off. In albinism the cells lack the ability to produce pigment altogether. Human piebaldism has been observed to be associated with a very wide range and varying degrees of endocrine disorders, and is occasionally found together with heterochromia of the irises, congenital deafness, or incomplete gastrointestinal tract development, possibly all with the common cause of premature cutting off of human fetal growth hormone during gestation. Piebaldism is a kind of neurocristopathy, involving defects of various neural crest cell lineages that include melanocytes, but also involving many other tissues derived from the neural crest. Oncogenic factors, including mistranscription, are hypothesized to be related to the degree of phenotypic variation among affected individuals.

Piebaldism is an autosomal dominant hereditary condition, which tends to produce high rates of inheritance and long chains of generational transmission. All who inherit the gene have at some time in life evidence of piebald hypopigmentation of the hair or skin, most likely both.

Piebaldism may be associated with the genes KIT or SNAI2.

== Diagnosis ==
Usually diagnosed at birth with the appearance of patches of white skin on the arms, legs, stomach, forehead, and a white lock of hair.

== History ==
Early European photographers took many photographs of African people with piebaldism as a form of entertainment and fetishization. George Catlin is known to have additionally painted several portraits of Native Americans who were affected by piebaldism.

Historically, persons with extensive piebaldism have experienced abuse of the sort still suffered in the present by albinos. This has ranged from display of unclothed African piebalds in "freak" shows and postcards of the early 20th century to the forcing of piebalds (as in the case of albinos) to work long hours exposed to the sun (producing high rates of lethal skin cancers), to the use of piebald humans, including children, in risky medical experiments. The National Organization of Albinism and Hypopigmentation, as well as organizations such as Under the Same Sun, work to promote awareness of all forms of cutaneous variation and their medical implications, and to highlight human rights issues, especially the plight of albinos subject to extreme persecution in parts of Africa.

== Etymology ==
The word "piebald" originates from a combination of "pie," from "magpie", and "bald", meaning "white patch" or spot. The reference is to the distinctive black-and-white plumage of the magpie.

== See also ==
- Albinism
- Amelanism
- Dyschromia
- Erythrism
- Mosaic (Genetics)
- PAX3
- Heterochromia iridum
- Leucism
- Melanism
- Piebald
- Poliosis
- Skewbald
- Vitiligo
- Waardenburg syndrome
- Xanthochromism
