= List of Carleton College people =

Many notable people have been associated with Carleton College, located in Northfield, Minnesota.

== Notable alumni ==
=== Academia ===
- Lila Abu-Lughod, 1974, author, scholar and expert on the Arab world
- Robert C. Allen, 1969, professor of economic history at New York University Abu Dhabi
- R. Michael Alvarez, 1986, professor of political science at California Institute of Technology
- James C. Anthony, 1971, professor in the Department of Epidemiology at Michigan State University
- Daniel A. Arnold, 1988, philosopher at the University of Chicago
- Frank Edward Brown, 1929, preeminent Mediterranean archaeologist
- Penelope Brown, 1965, anthropologist, co-creator of the theory of politeness
- David M. Carr, 1980, professor of Old Testament at the Union Theological Seminary
- Arland F. Christ-Janer, 1943, president of the College Entrance Examination Board and sixth president of Boston University
- Kimberly Clausing, 1991, economist at Reed College and UCLA School of Law
- Geoffrey Claussen, 2001, professor of religious studies at Elon University
- Michael Cunningham, NA, social psychologist and professor in the Department of Communications at the University of Louisville
- Anthony Downs, 1952, author of An Economic Theory of Democracy, senior fellow at the Brookings Institution
- Buell G. Gallagher, 1925, president of Talladega College; president of City College of New York
- Regan Gurung, 1991, professor of psychology and author
- Susan Hekman, 1971, professor of political science and director of the graduate humanities program at the University of Texas at Arlington
- Lynn Hunt, 1967, emerita professor of French and European history at UCLA; past president of the American Historical Association (2002)
- John Lavine, 1963, dean of Medill School of Journalism
- Alfred R. Lindesmith, 1927, professor of sociology at Indiana University known for contributions to the study of drug addiction
- Dennis Meadows, 1964, co-author of The Limits to Growth
- Donella Meadows, 1963, lead author of The Limits to Growth
- Thomas Mengler, 1975, president of St. Mary's University (Texas), former dean of Law at University of St. Thomas and former dean of the University of Illinois College of Law
- William G. Moseley, 1987, writer and professor of geography at Macalester College
- Robert Paarlberg, 1967, professor of political science at Wellesley College, researcher of international agricultural and environmental policy
- Kathy Peiss, 1975, professor of American history at University of Pennsylvania; former chair of the history department and winner of a Guggenheim Fellowship
- William B. Pickett, 1962, historian and professor emeritus at Rose-Hulman Institute of Technology, Terre Haute, Indiana
- Lucian Pye, 1943, political scientist and renowned sinologist, taught at Massachusetts Institute of Technology for 35 years
- Katherine Rowe, 1984, first female president of The College of William & Mary
- Laura Ruetsche, 1987, chair of the philosophy department at the University of Michigan
- Jay Rubenstein, 1989, historian, recipient of the MacArthur Fellowship
- Jennie Lasby Tessmann, 1904, spectroscopist and astronomy educator
- Stephen E. Thorsett, 1987, president of Willamette University, physicist, astronomer, former dean of UC Santa Cruz Division of Physical and Biological Sciences
- Thorstein Veblen, 1880, economist and author of The Theory of the Leisure Class

=== Arts ===
- Cathy Cade, 1963, lesbian activist and photographer
- Jack Carson, 1932, actor, star of many films including Mildred Pierce, Cat on a Hot Tin Roof, A Star Is Born
- Lincoln Child, 1979, New York Times Bestselling author of techno-thrillers
- Jimmy Chin, 1996, Academy Award winning National Geographic photographer, documentary filmmaker, and mountain climber
- Masanori Mark Christianson, 1998, musician/creative director, member of indie band Rogue Wave
- Stuart Comer, 1990, chief curator at the Museum of Modern Art (MoMA)
- Bob Daily, 1986, television producer and screenwriter for Desperate Housewives, Frasier, and Superior Donuts
- Pamela Dean, 1975, fantasy writer
- Brian Freeman, 1984, suspense fiction author
- Pierce P. Furber, 1871, architect with the firm Peabody & Stearns
- Piotr Gajewski, 1981, founder, director and artistic director of the National Philharmonic Orchestra
- Robert Gottschalk, 1939, Academy Award winner and founder of Panavision
- Peter Gwinn, 1993, writer for The Colbert Report
- Jane Hamilton, 1979, novelist and winner of the Hemingway Foundation/PEN Award, author of The Book of Ruth
- Hal Higdon, 1953, runner and writer
- Loyce Houlton, 1946, choreographer and founder of the Minnesota Dance Theatre
- Christopher Kratt, 1992, TV and film producer, host of Zoboomafoo and Wild Kratts
- Naomi Kritzer, 1995, Locus Award and Hugo Award-winning author of speculative fiction, and blogger
- Clare Walker Leslie, 1968, naturalist and nature writer
- Grace Llewellyn, 1986, author of The Teenage Liberation Handbook
- James Loewen, 1964, historian and author of Lies My Teacher Told Me
- Erica Lord, 2001, artist
- Zach McGowan, 2002, actor, roles in television shows including Black Sails and Agents of S.H.I.E.L.D.
- Beverly Naidus, 1975, artist
- Barrie M. Osborne, 1966, producer of the Lord of the Rings film trilogy
- Parker Palmer, 1961, author, founder of the Center for Courage & Renewal
- Andrij Parekh, 1994, cinematographer for popular television (13 Reasons Why), film (The Zookeepers Wife), and music videos (Electric Feel for MGMT)
- Veronica Roth, NA, author of the Divergent series; transferred to Northwestern University after her first year
- Carl Schmidt, 2020, reality TV star, participant of Love Island season 8.
- T. J. Stiles, 1986, non-fiction writer, two-time winner of the Pulitzer Prize, for Biography in 2010 and for History in 2016
- Marilyn Stokstad, 1950, art historian
- Peter Tork of The Monkees, 1963, student at Carleton 1960–1963 (then known as Peter Thorkelson)
- Laura Veirs, 1997, singer-songwriter, member of supergroup case/lang/veirs
- Helene Wecker, 1997, author of the historical fantasy novel The Golem and the Jinni
- Wendy West, 1994, television producer and Emmy award-nominated writer of the Showtime drama Dexter
- Patricia Collins Wrede, 1974, fantasy writer, author of the Enchanted Forest Chronicles
- Karen Tei Yamashita, 1973, novelist, author of I Hotel and Tropic of Orange
- Kao Kalia Yang, 2003, Hmong-American writer and author of The Latehomecomer: A Hmong Family Memoir and The Song Poet

=== Journalism ===
- Kai Bird, 1973, Pulitzer Prize-winning biographer and journalist
- Jonathan Capehart, 1989, journalist, winner of the 1999 Pulitzer Prize for Editorial Writing
- Maya Dusenbery, 2008, executive director of the feminist blog Feministing
- Jack El-Hai, 1979, writer and journalist
- Michael Gartner, 1960, journalist, former president of NBC news, winner of the Pulitzer Prize for Editorial Writing
- Dara Moskowitz Grumdahl, 1992, James Beard Award-winning food writer
- John F. Harris, 1985, editor-in-chief of Politico
- Brian Klaas, 2008, columnist at The Washington Post, assistant professor at University College London
- Margaret Manton Merrill, 1873, journalist
- Peter Schjeldahl, 1965, art critic for The New Yorker, finalist for the 2022 Pulitzer Prize for Criticism
- Garrick Utley, 1961, journalist, former host of Meet the Press

=== Business ===
- Arnold W. Donald, 1976, former CEO of Carnival Corporation & plc cruise company
- Robert K. Greenleaf, 1926, corporate management expert, founder of the Greenleaf Center for Servant Leadership
- Laura Silber, 1982, chief communications operator for the Open Society Foundations

=== Politics and government ===
- Chude Pam Allen, 1965, activist, Freedom Summer participant and involved in the women's liberation movement
- C. S. Amsden, NA, South Dakota politician
- Ellen Anderson, 1982, Minnesota politician
- Eugenie Moore Anderson, 1931, first woman appointed as United States ambassador, first woman to sign a treaty on behalf of the US, first woman to represent the United States on the United Nations Security Council
- Michael Armacost, 1958, former under secretary of state (Policy); former ambassador to Japan and the Philippines; president of the Brookings Institution 1995–2002; former chairman of the board of trustees at Carleton 2004–2008
- Jack Barnes, 1961, leader of the Socialist Workers Party
- Duane C. Butcher, 1987, U.S. chargé d'affaires in Romania 2012–2014, and in Uzbekistan 2010–2011
- Tom Freedman, 1996, chief of staff for Political Strategy for the Clinton/Gore Campaign
- John A. Gale, 1962, secretary of state of Nebraska since 2000
- Susan Golding, 1966, two-term mayor of San Diego
- Rush Holt Jr., 1970, U.S. representative for New Jersey's 12th congressional district 1999–2015; CEO of the American Association for the Advancement of Science (AAAS) and executive publisher of the Science family of journals since 2015
- Eleanor Kinnaird, 1953, North Carolina state senator
- Warren P. Knowles, 1930, governor of Wisconsin 1965–1971
- Jimmy Kolker, 1970, former ambassador to Burkina Faso and Uganda, former chief of HIV/AIDs section at UNICEF, current assistant secretary for Global Affairs at the U.S. Department of Health and Human Services
- Melvin Laird, 1942, President Nixon's secretary of defense 1969–1973
- Todd Larson, 1983, LGBT activist, served on the board of directors of the International Gay and Lesbian Human Rights Commission 2007–2013
- Jack Lew, NA, United States secretary of the treasury and 25th White House chief of staff; transferred to Harvard College after his freshman year
- Fue Lee, 2013, Hmong-American politician, Minnesota House of Representatives 2016–
- Ernest Lundeen, 1901, Minnesota politician; U.S. representative 1917–1919 and 1933–1937; U.S. senator from 1937 until his death in 1940
- Karl Mundt, 1923, U.S. representative 1938–1948; U.S. senator 1948–1973 for South Dakota
- Tom Nelson, 1998, former Wisconsin state representative and assembly majority leader
- Anna Paulson, NA, economist, incoming president of the Federal Reserve Bank of Philadelphia
- John C. Raines, 1955, professor at Temple University, activist who broke into an F.B.I. office and exposed abuses of power
- Paul Tewes, 1993, Democratic political consultant
- Sheldon B. Vance, 1939, U.S. ambassador to Zaire 1969–1974
- Liz Watson, 1996, Democratic nominee for Indiana's 9th Congressional District

=== Law ===
- Lynn H. Ashley, 1909, district attorney for St. Croix County, Wisconsin
- Pierce Butler, 1887, Supreme Court justice 1923–1939
- Ben C. Duniway, 1928, judge of the United States Court of Appeals for the Ninth Circuit
- Audrey Fleissig, 1976, judge of the United States District Court for the Eastern District of Missouri
- Elizabeth L. Gleicher, 1976, judge on the Michigan Court of Appeals
- Herbert Goodrich, 1911, judge of the United States Court of Appeals for the Third Circuit, Director of the American Law Institute, chair of the drafting committee of the Uniform Commercial Code
- Gordon Moore, 1985, associate justice of the Minnesota Supreme Court
- Brenda Sannes, 1980, judge of the United States District Court for the Northern District of New York
- Cordenio Severance, 1880, former president of the American Bar Association
- Stephen Six, 1988, Kansas attorney general 2008–2011

=== Science ===
- Walter Alvarez, 1962, geologist credited with the theory that an asteroid impact was the likely cause of the Cretaceous-Tertiary extinction event
- Evelyn Anderson, 1921, physiologist and biochemist, co-discoverer of andrenocorticotropic hormone (ACTH)
- Kinsey Anderson, 1949, pioneer space physicist and member of the National Academy of Sciences
- Linda Bartoshuk, 1960, psychologist at the University of Florida, specializes in smell and taste
- Elizabeth Beise, 1981, professor of physics at the University of Maryland, College Park
- Robert G. Bergman, 1963, professor of chemistry emeritus at UC Berkeley, winner of the Wolf Prize in Chemistry
- Linda M. Boxer, 1973, professor of hematology, vice dean of Stanford University School of Medicine
- Ann T. Bowling, 1965, leading geneticist on the study of horses, one of the leaders of the horse genome project
- Kenneth G. Caulton, NA, professor of inorganic chemistry at the Indiana University
- Joy Crisp, 1979, planetary geologist
- Carl R. Eklund, 1932, leading ornithologist and member of one of the longest recorded Antarctic sled dog journeys, namesake of the Eklund Islands
- Sarah K. England, 1988, physiologist and biophysicist; professor of obstetrics and gynecology at Washington University in St. Louis
- Barbara Fredrickson, 1986, social psychologist studying emotions and positive psychology at University of North Carolina Chapel Hill
- Alan Gelperin, 1962, professor at Princeton University, specializes in olfaction, known for electronic scent detection and identification
- David Gerdes, 1986, astrophysicist and professor of physics at the University of Michigan
- Todd Golub, 1985, professor of pediatrics at Harvard, known for applying the tools of genomics to study cancer
- Robert Edward Gross, 1927, highly distinguished surgeon and one of the pioneers of cardiac surgery
- James V. Haxby, 1973, neuroscientist known for face perception, director of the Dartmouth Brain Imaging Center at Dartmouth College
- Stephen P. Hubbell, 1963, ecologist, author of the unified neutral theory of biodiversity, founder of what would become the National Council for Science and the Environment
- Robert C. Hughes, chemist, fellow of the American Physical Society
- Kathy Hudson, 1982, microbiologist specializing in science policy, former deputy director for science, outreach, and policy at the National Institutes of Health, assisted in the creation of All of Us, the BRAIN initiative, the National Center for Advancing Translational Sciences, and founded the Genetics and Public Policy Center at Johns Hopkins University
- Mary-Claire King, 1967, human geneticist, discoverer of BRCA1
- Yvonne Connolly Martin, 1958, expert in the field of cheminfomatics
- Eric Pianka, 1960, biologist, herpetologist and well-known evolutionary ecologist known as "the Lizard Man;" pioneered work on r/K selection theory
- Kenneth Poss, 1992, biologist, James B. Duke Professor in the Department of Cell Biology at Duke University, known for his work on regeneration. AAAS fellow
- Peter H. Schultz, 1966, Brown University geology professor; co-investigator to the NASA Science Mission Directorate spacecraft Deep Impact; awarded the Barringer Medal of the Meteoritical Society in 2004
- Christine Siddoway, 1984, geologist and Antarctic researcher
- Douglas Vakoch, 1983, astrobiologist, president of METI (Messaging Extraterrestrial Intelligence)
- Simine Vazire, 2000, psychologist at the University of California, Davis with research in self-perception and self-knowledge
- Ray Wendland, 1933, experimental petrochemist and academic
- Sidney C. Wolff, 1962, astrophysicist, first woman to be named director of the National Optical Astronomy Observatory and the first director of the Gemini Project
- Anne Sewell Young, 1892, astronomy professor at Mt. Holyoke College and founding member of the American Association of Variable Star Observers

=== Religion ===
- Dale Ahlquist, 1980, author, scholar of G. K. Chesterton
- Kirbyjon Caldwell, 1975, pastor of the Windsor Village United Methodist Church in Houston, Texas; spiritual advisor to Presidents George W. Bush and Barack Obama
- Arcturus Z. Conrad, 1882, theologian, pastor at Park Street Church in Boston, Massachusetts
- Henry H. Riggs, 1902, Christian missionary and historical witness to the Armenian genocide of the early 20th century
- Margaret Towner, 1948, religious leader, first woman minister ordained by the northern branch of the American Presbyterian Church
- Tsune Watanabe, 1891, president of the Congregational Woman's Missionary Society of Japan, temperance activist, educator

=== Sports ===
- Stub Allison, 1917, head football coach at UC Berkeley (1935–1944), his 1937 team won the Rose Bowl in 1938
- Osborne Cowles, 1922, athlete and coach for Carleton; basketball head coach at University of Minnesota, Michigan and Dartmouth
- Philip Dunn, 1993, competed in 2000, 2004, 2008 Olympics in the race walking event
- Freddie Gillespie, NA, NBA player for Toronto Raptors; transferred to Baylor University after his sophomore year
- Matthew Wilkinson, 2021, competed in the 2024 Paris Olympics in the steeplechase

=== Other ===
- Donald H. Elliott, 1954, urban planner
- Jane Elizabeth Hodgson, 1934, physician; founding fellow of American College of Obstetricians and Gynecologists; pioneer in women's reproductive health; abortion rights advocate
- Anthony Myint, 1999, restaurateur, founder of Mission Street Food, Mission Chinese Food and Commonwealth in San Francisco; author of Mission Street Food

=== Fictional ===
- Ben Wyatt, a likable yet neurotic government worker played by Adam Scott on the television series Parks and Recreation, is revealed to be a Carleton alumnus in a season six episode. He had previously been shown wearing a fictionalized Carleton College Intramural Champions tee-shirt.

== Notable faculty ==
- Ian Barbour, professor of religion; 1989–1991 Gifford Lecturer on religion and science; winner of the 1999 Templeton Prize for Progress in Religion
- Mary Lathrop Benton, dean of women, assistant to the president, professor of French
- H. Scott Bierman, professor of economics, department chair, academic dean; game theory expert; president of Beloit College 2009–present
- David Bryn-Jones, biographer of U.S. Secretary of State Frank B. Kellogg; taught history, economics, and international relations at Carleton 1920–1951
- John Bates Clark, economist; taught Thorstein Veblen
- Frank Daniel, Czech-born writer, producer, director, and teacher; developer of the sequence paradigm of screenwriting
- Albert Elsen, assistant professor of art history 1952–1958
- Laurence McKinley Gould, second-in-command to Richard E. Byrd on his first landmark expedition to Antarctica; professor of geology; Carleton College president 1945–1962
- Roy Grow, former Kellogg Professor of International Relations and director of International Relations; former military interpreter; expert on Asia
- Deanna Haunsperger, president of the Mathematical Association of America
- Greg Hewett, professor of English; poet; winner of the Thom Gunn Award
- Ian Holbourn, writer; Laird of Foula; instrumental in creating the art department
- Gao Hong, composer and performer of Chinese music, among the world's top pipa players
- Adeeb Khalid, professor of Asian studies and history
- Burton Levin, former United States consul general to Hong Kong and US Ambassador to Burma 1987–1990; currently the SIT Investment Visiting Professor of Asian Policy
- Cormac Ó Gráda, visiting professor of history in 2021; foremost authority on Irish economic history and the history of the Jews in Ireland
- Maria Lugones, feminist philosopher; professor of philosophy 1973–1993
- Charles Christopher Mierow, professor of biography 1934–1951, former president of Colorado College 1925–1933; eminent historian, translator and linguist
- Louis E. Newman, John M. and Elizabeth W. Musser Professor of Religious Studies, emeritus
- Gregory Blake Smith, novelist and short story writer; Lloyd P. Johnson Norwest Professor of English and the Liberal Arts
- Paul Wellstone, U.S. senator from Minnesota from 1991 until his death in 2002; professor of political science 1969–1990
- Reed Whittemore, professor of English; poet; Poet Laureate Consultant in Poetry to the Library of Congress in 1964 and 1984

== Presidents of the college ==
1. James Strong, 1870–1903
2. William Henry Sallmon, 1903–1908
3. Donald J. Cowling, 1909–1945
4. Laurence McKinley Gould, 1945–1962
5. John W. Nason, 1962–1970
6. Howard Swearer, 1970–1977
7. Robert H. Edwards, 1977–1986
8. David H. Porter, 1986–1987
9. Stephen R. Lewis Jr., 1987–2002
10. Robert A. Oden, 2002–2010
11. Steven G. Poskanzer, 2010–2021
12. Alison Byerly, 2021–present
