= Michael Cunningham (disambiguation) =

Michael Cunningham is an American novelist and screenwriter.

Michael or Mike Cunningham may also refer to:

- Michael Cunningham (psychologist), American social psychologist
- Michael R. Cunningham, university administrator
- Michael Cunningham (footballer, born 2001), Scottish footballer
- Michael Cunningham (footballer, born 1991), English footballer
- Mike Cunningham (baseball), American Major League Baseball pitcher
- Mike Cunningham (politician), member of the Missouri Senate
- Mike Cunningham (police officer), British police officer
