= Icelandic horse =

Small horse breed developed in Iceland

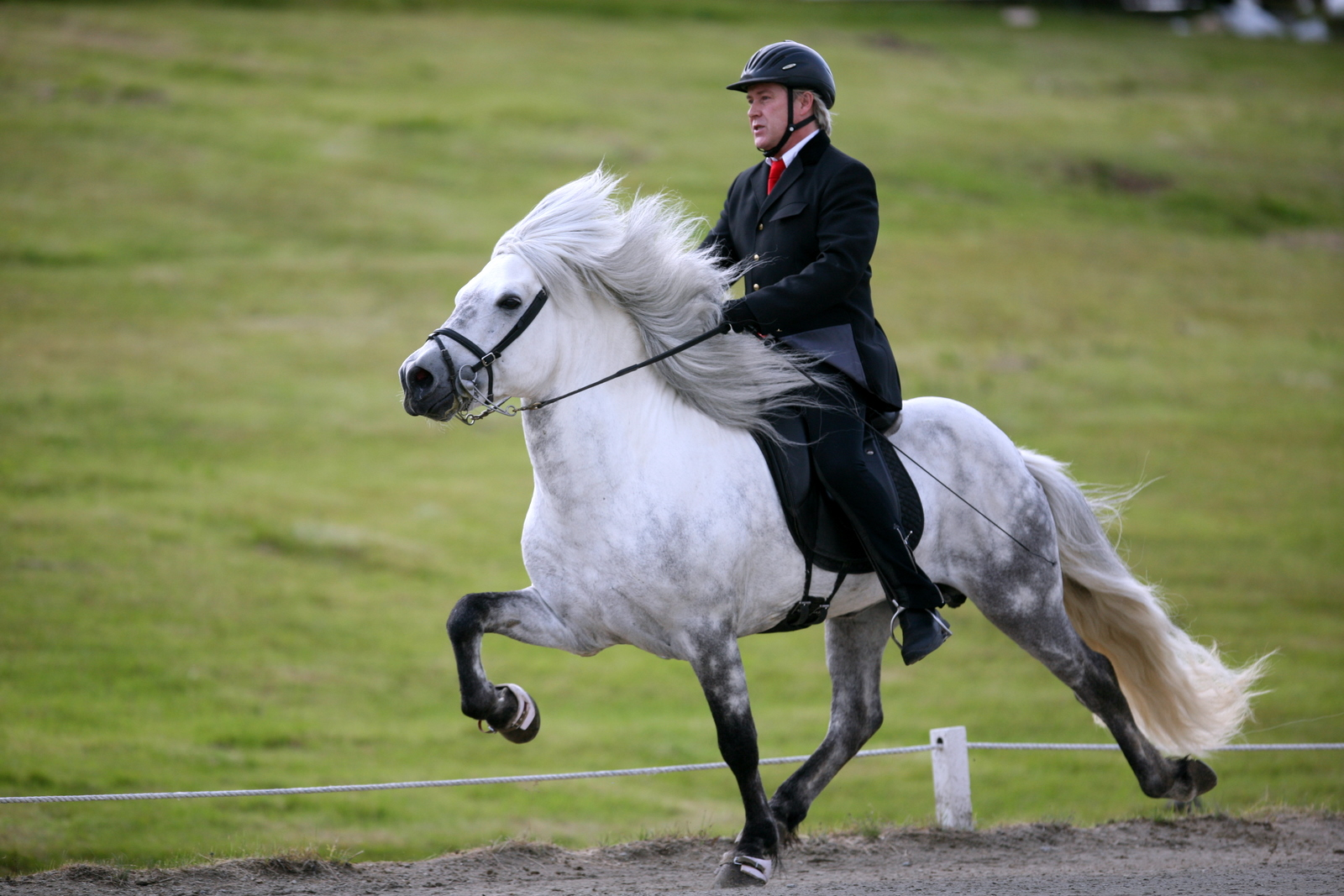
- Icelandic horse performing tölt
- Country of origin: Iceland

Traits
- Distinguishing features: Sturdy build, shorter height, fluffy-thick coat; two unique gaits.

Breed standards
- United States Icelandic Horse Conference; The Icelandic Horse Society of Great Britain

The Icelandic horse (Icelandic: íslenski hesturinn [ˈistlɛnscɪ ˈhɛstʏrɪn]), or Icelandic, is a breed of horse developed in Iceland. Although the horses are smaller (at times pony-sized) than other breeds, most registries for the Icelandic refer to it as a horse. The breed is long-lived and hardy, owing to the ruggedness of its home country. In their native Iceland they have few afflictions or diseases, thus national laws are in place preventing foreign-born horses from being imported into the country, while exported animals are not permitted to return. In addition to the gaits of walk, trot, and canter/gallop, typical of other horse breeds, many Icelandic horses can also do the tölt (ambling gait) and the flying pace. The only breed of horse in Iceland, the Icelandic is also popular internationally, and sizable populations exist in Europe and North America. The breed is still used for traditional sheepherding work in its native country, as well as for leisure, showing, and racing.

Developed from ponies brought to Iceland by Norse settlers in the 9th and 10th centuries, the breed is mentioned in various documents from throughout Icelandic history; an early reference to a named-horse appears in the 12th century. Horses were venerated in Germanic religion, a custom brought to Iceland by the country's earliest settlers. Centuries of selective breeding have developed the Icelandic horse into its modern physical form, with natural selection having also played a role in overall hardiness and disease resistance; the harsh Icelandic climate likely eliminated many weaker horses early on due to exposure and malnourishment, with the strongest passing on their genes. In the 1780s, much of the breed was wiped out in the aftermath of a volcanic eruption at Laki. The first breed society for the Icelandic horse was created in Iceland in 1904, and the breed is represented by organizations in 22 different nations as of 2024, organised under a parent association, the International Federation of Icelandic Horse Associations.

== Breed characteristics ==
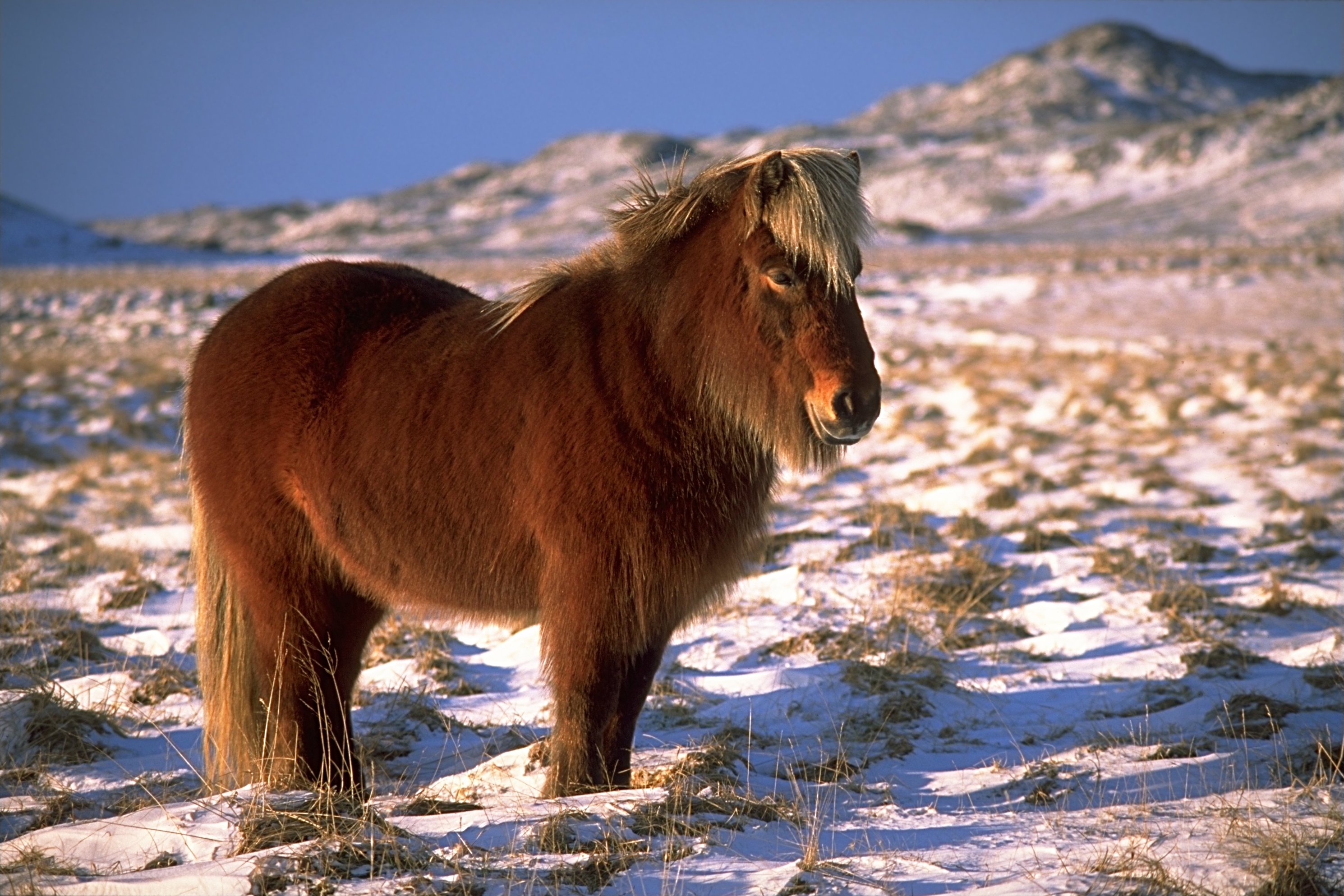
An Icelandic horse in full winter coat

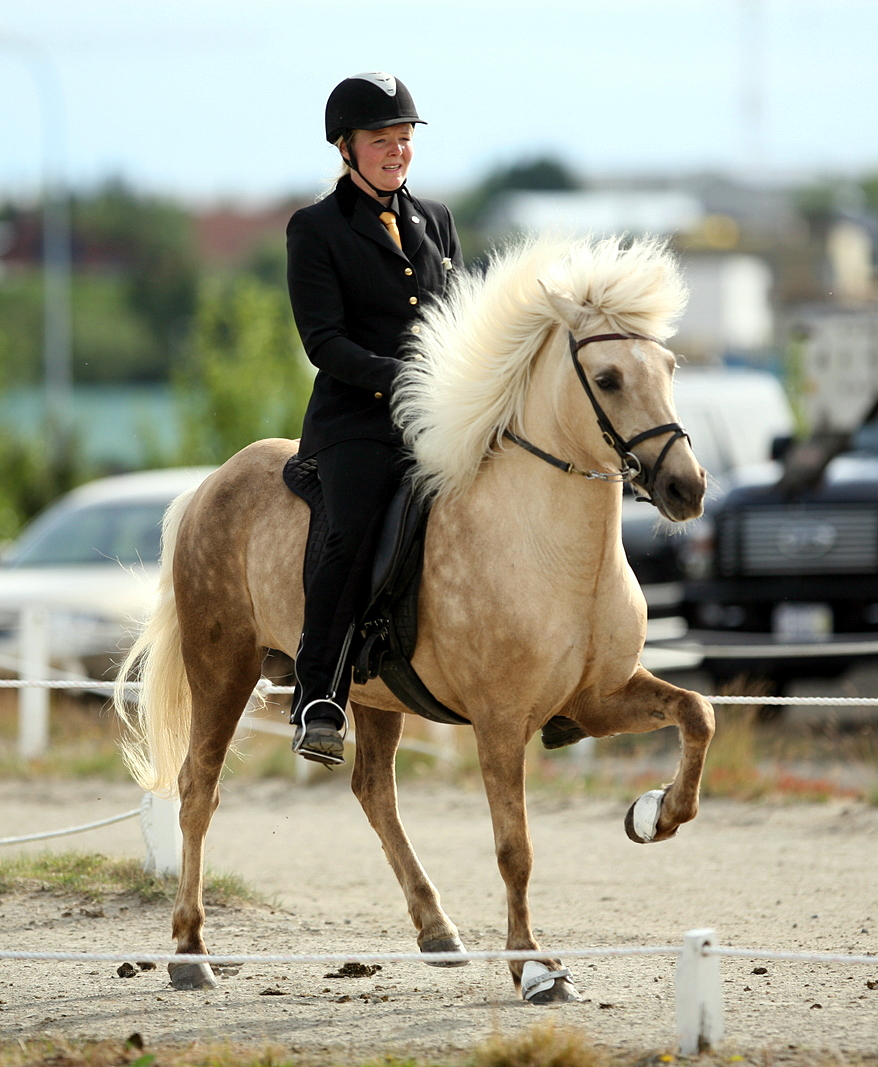
An Icelandic being ridden at a tölt

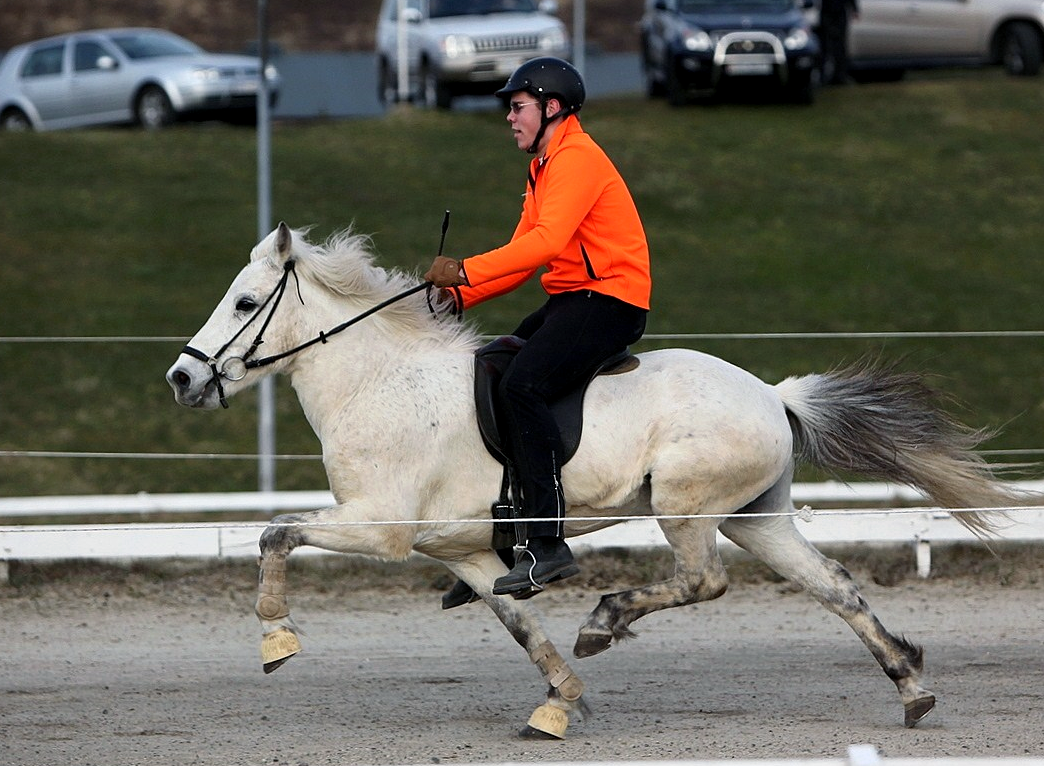
An Icelandic horse being ridden at the flying pace

=== Size ===
Icelandic horses weigh between 330 and 380 kilograms (730 and 840 lb) and stand an average of 13 and 14 hands (52 and 56 inches, 132 and 142 cm) high, although the shortest measured Icelandic horse was 113cm (11.1hh), and the tallest measured 157cm (15.3hh). This is often considered pony size; however, breeders and breed registries always refer to Icelandics as horses. The official breeding goal gives room for substantial variations in size.

Several theories have been put forward as to why Icelandics are always called horses, among them the breed's spirited temperament and large personality compared with smaller breeds. Another theory suggests that the breed's weight, bone structure, rideability and weight-carrying abilities mean it can be classified as a horse, rather than a pony.

=== Coat colours ===
The breed comes in many coat colours, including chestnut, dun, bay, black, gray, palomino, pinto and roan, as well as bicolour/pied with large black/brown blotches over a white coat. There are over 100 names for various colors and color patterns in the Icelandic language. They have well-proportioned heads, with straight profiles and wide foreheads. The neck is short, muscular, and broad at the base; the withers broad and low. The chest is deep; the shoulders are muscular and slightly sloping and the back is long. The croup is broad, muscular, short and slightly sloping. The legs are strong and short, with relatively long cannon bones and short pasterns. The mane and tail are full, with coarse hair, and the tail is set low. The breed is known to be hardy and an easy keeper. The breed has a double coat developed for extra insulation in cold temperatures.

=== Breeding characteristics ===
Characteristics differ between various groups of Icelandic horses, depending on the focus of individual breeders. Many breed for temperament; some breed animals for pack and draft work, which are conformationally distinct from those bred for work under saddle, which are carefully selected for their ability to perform the traditional Icelandic gaits. Others are bred solely for horsemeat. Some breeders focus on favoured coat colours or patterns.

Icelandic horses are not usually ridden until they are four years old, and structural development is not complete until age seven. Their most productive years are between eight and eighteen, although they retain their strength and stamina into their twenties. An Icelandic mare that lived in Denmark reached a record age of 56, while another horse, living in Great Britain, reached the age of 42. The horses are highly fertile, and both sexes are fit for breeding up to age 25; mares have been recorded giving birth at age 27. The horses tend to not be easily spooked, probably the result of not having any natural predators in their native Iceland. Icelandics tend to be friendly, docile and easy to handle, while also being enthusiastic and self-assured. As a result of their isolation from other horses, diseases in the breed on the island of Iceland are virtually unknown, albeit with the exception of certain kinds of internal parasites. The low prevalence of disease in Iceland is attributed to strict Icelandic law preventing horses which have been exported out of the country from being returned, and by requiring that all equine equipment brought into the country be either brand-new and unused, and/or fully disinfected. Hence, Iceland-born horses have no acquired immunity to many diseases; an infection on the island would likely be devastating to the entire breed. This can create issues when showing native Icelandic horses against other foreign-born horses, as the same national laws for horses apply to all species of livestock animals; once an animal has left the country, they are not allowed to return.

=== Gaits ===
The Icelandic is a "five-gaited" breed, known for its sure-footedness and ability to cross rough terrain. As well as the typical gaits of walk, trot, and canter/gallop, the breed is noted for its ability to perform two additional gaits. Although most horse experts consider the canter and gallop to be separate gaits, on the basis of a small variation in the footfall pattern, Icelandic breed registries consider the canter and gallop one gait, hence the term "five-gaited".

The first additional gait is a four-beat lateral ambling gait known as the tölt. This is known for its explosive acceleration and speed; it is also comfortable and ground-covering. There is considerable variation in style within the gait, and thus the tölt is variously compared to similar lateral gaits such as the rack of the Saddlebred, the largo of the Paso Fino, or the running walk of the Tennessee Walking Horse. Like all lateral ambling gaits, the footfall pattern is the same as the walk (left hind, left front, right hind, right front), but differs from the walk in that it can be performed at a range of speeds, from the speed of a typical fast walk up to the speed of a normal canter. Some Icelandic horses prefer to tölt, while others prefer to trot; correct training can improve weak gaits, but the tölt is a natural gait present from birth. There are two varieties of the tölt that are considered incorrect by breeders. The first is an uneven gait called a "Pig's Pace" or "Piggy-pace" that is closer to a two-beat pace than a four-beat amble. The second is called a Valhopp and is a tölt and canter combination most often seen in untrained young horses or horses that mix their gaits. Both varieties are normally uncomfortable to ride.

The breed also performs a pace called a skeið, flugskeið or "flying pace". It is used in pacing races, and is fast and smooth, with some horses able to reach up to 30 miles per hour (48 km/h). Not all Icelandic horses can perform this gait; animals that perform both the tölt and the flying pace in addition to the traditional gaits are considered the best of the breed. The flying pace is a two-beat lateral gait with a moment of suspension between footfalls; each side has both feet land almost simultaneously (left hind and left front, suspension, right hind and right front). It is meant to be performed by well-trained and balanced horses with skilled riders. It is not a gait used for long-distance travel. A slow pace is uncomfortable for the rider and is not encouraged when training the horse to perform the gait. Although most pacing horses are raced in harness using sulkies, in Iceland horses are raced while ridden.

== History ==
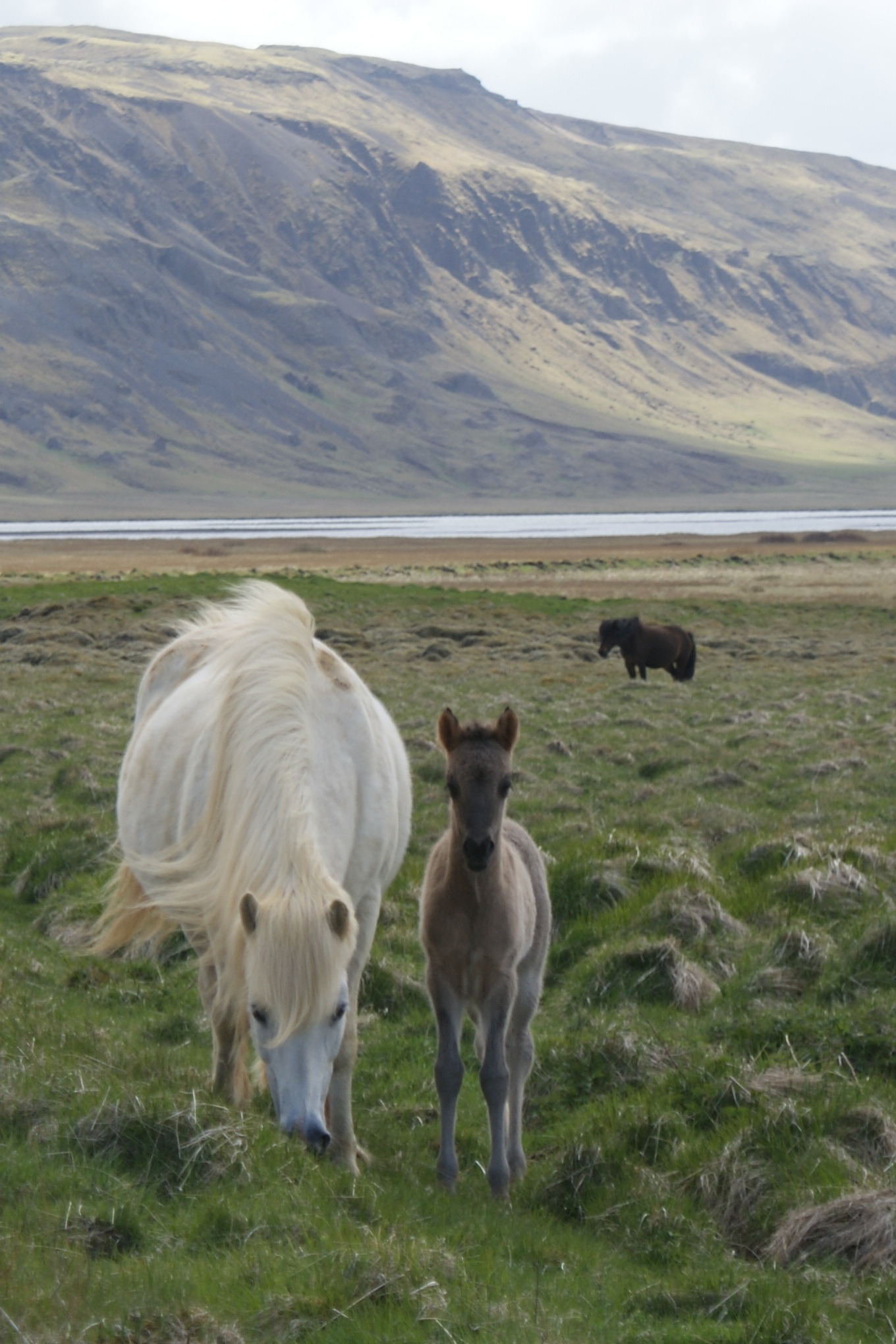
An Icelandic mare and foal

The ancestors of the Icelandic horse were probably brought to Iceland by Viking Age Scandinavians between 860 and 935 AD. The Norse settlers were followed by immigrants from Norse colonies in Ireland, the Isle of Man and the Western Isles of Scotland. These later settlers arrived with the ancestors of what would elsewhere become Shetland, Highland, and Connemara ponies, which were crossed with the previously imported animals. There may also have been a connection with the Yakut pony, and the breed has physical similarities to the Nordlandshest of Norway. Other breeds with similar characteristics include the Faroe pony of the Faeroe Islands and the Norwegian Fjord horse. Genetic analyses have revealed links between the Mongolian horse and the Icelandic horse. Mongolian horses are believed to have been originally imported from Russia by Swedish traders; this imported Mongol stock subsequently contributed to the Fjord, Exmoor, Scottish Highland, Shetland and Connemara breeds, all of which have been found to be genetically linked to the Icelandic horse.

Attempts were made to introduce eastern blood into the Icelandic, resulting in a degeneration of the stock. In 982 AD the Icelandic Althing (parliament) passed laws prohibiting the importation of horses into Iceland, thus ending crossbreeding. The breed has now been bred pure in Iceland for more than 1,000 years.

The early Germanic peoples, including those living in Scandinavia, venerated horses and slaughtered and ate them at blóts throughout the Viking Age. When these settlers arrived in Iceland, they brought their beliefs, and their horses, with them. Horses play a significant part in Nordic mythology with many, including Odin's eight-footed pacer named Sleipnir, allowing gods and other beings to travel between realms and across the sky. Skalm, a mare who is the first Icelandic horse known by name, appeared in the Book of Settlements from the 12th century. According to the book, a chieftain named Seal-Thorir founded a settlement at the place where Skalm stopped and lay down with her pack. Horses also play key roles in the Icelandic sagas Hrafnkel's Saga, Njal's Saga and Grettir's Saga. Although written in the 13th century, these three sagas are set as far back as the 9th century. This early literature has influenced many riding clubs and horse herds in modern Iceland, still bearing the names of horses from Norse mythology.

Horses were often considered the most prized possession of a medieval Icelander. Indispensable to warriors, war horses were sometimes buried alongside their fallen riders, and stories were told of their deeds. Icelanders also arranged for bloody fights between stallions; these were used for entertainment and to pick the best animals for breeding, and they were described in both literature and official records from the Commonwealth period of 930 to 1262 AD. Stallion fights were an important part of Icelandic culture, and brawls, both physical and verbal, among the spectators were common. The conflicts at the horse fights gave rivals a chance to improve their political and social standing at the expense of their enemies and had wide social and political repercussions, sometimes leading to the restructuring of political alliances. However, not all human fights were serious, and the events provided a stage for friends and even enemies to battle without the possibility of major consequences. Courting between young men and women was also common at horse fights.

Natural selection played a major role in the development of the breed, as large numbers of horses died from lack of food and exposure to the elements. Between 874 and 1300 AD, during the more favorable climatic conditions of the medieval warm period, Icelandic breeders selectively bred horses according to special rules of color and conformation. From 1300 to 1900, selective breeding became less of a priority; the climate was often severe and many horses and people died. Between 1783 and 1784, around 70% of the horses in Iceland were killed by volcanic ash poisoning and starvation after the 1783 eruption of Lakagígar. The eruption lasted eight months, covered hundreds of square miles of land with lava, and rerouted or dried up several rivers. The population slowly recovered during the next hundred years, and from the beginning of the 20th century selective breeding again became important. The first Icelandic breed societies were established in 1904, and the first breed registry in Iceland was established in 1923.

Icelandics were exported to Great Britain before the 20th century to work as pit ponies in the coal mines, because of their strength and small size. However, those horses were never registered and little evidence of their existence remains. The first formal exports of Icelandic horses were to Germany in the 1940s. Great Britain's first official imports were in 1956, when a Scottish farmer, Stuart McKintosh, began a breeding program. Other breeders in Great Britain followed McKintosh's lead, and the Icelandic Horse Society of Great Britain was formed in 1986. The number of Icelandic horses exported to other nations has steadily increased since the first exports of the mid-19th century. Since 1969, multiple societies have worked together to preserve, improve and market these horses under the auspices of the International Federation of Icelandic Horse Associations. The Icelandic remains a breed known for its purity of bloodline, and is the only horse breed present in Iceland.

The Icelandic is especially popular in western Europe, Scandinavia, and North America. There are about 80,000 Icelandic horses in Iceland (compared to a human population of 317,000), and around 100,000 abroad. Almost 50,000 are in Germany, which has many active riding clubs and breed societies.

== Uses ==
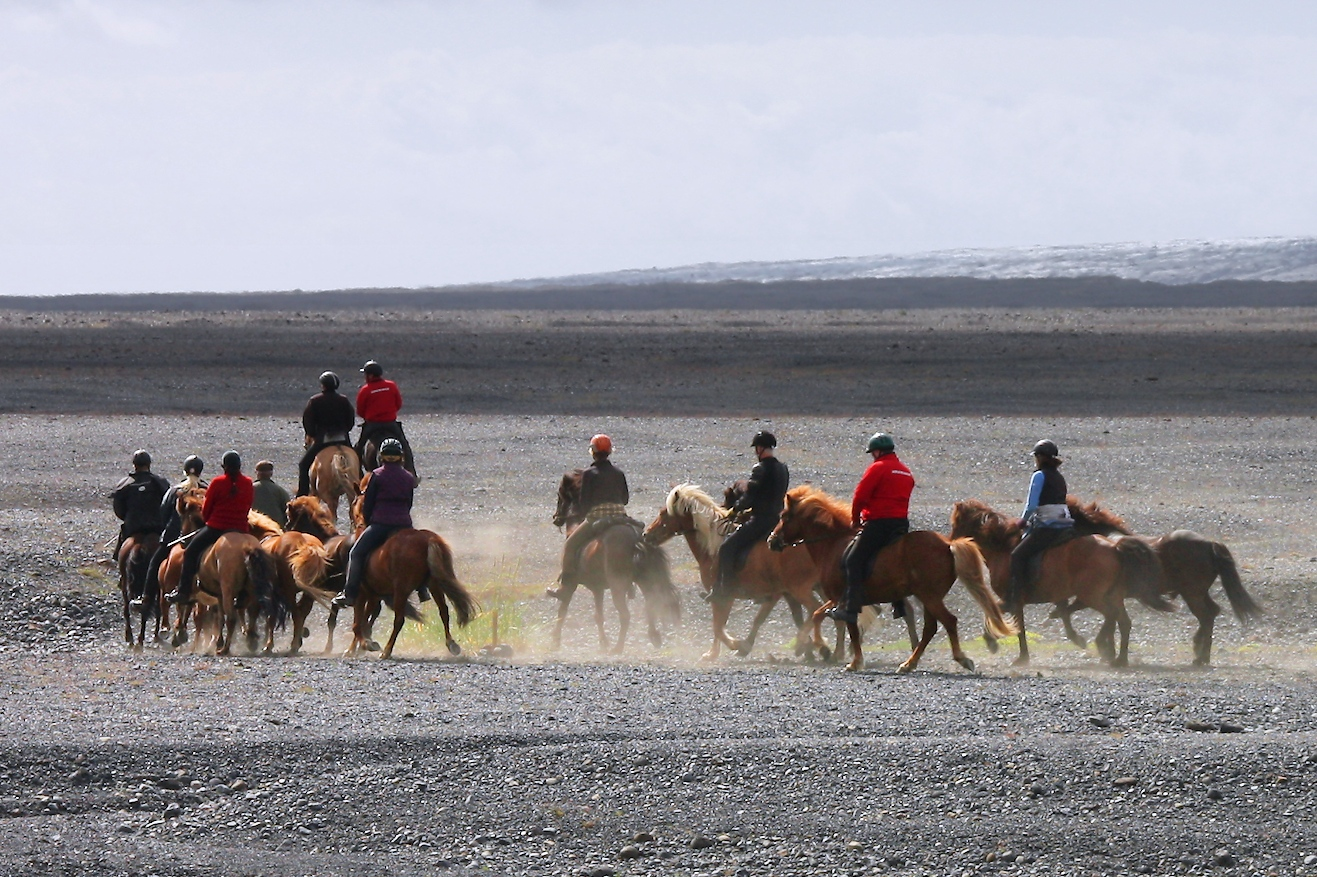
Icelandic horse tour in Skaftafell, Vatnajökull National Park

Icelandic horses still play a large part in Icelandic life, despite increasing mechanization and road improvements that diminish the necessity for the breed's use. The first official Icelandic horse race was held at Akureyri in 1874, and many races are held throughout the country from April through June. Both gallop and pace races are held, as well as performance classes showcasing the breed's unique gaits. Winter events are often held, including races on frozen bodies of water. In 2009 such an event resulted in both horses and riders falling into the water and needing to be rescued. The first shows, focused on the quality of animals as breeding stock, were held in 1906. The Agricultural Society of Iceland, along with the National Association of Riding Clubs, organizes regular shows with a wide variety of classes. Some horses are bred for slaughter, and much of the meat is exported to Japan. Farmers still use the breed to round up sheep in the Icelandic highlands, and tourism is a growing industry, but most horses are used for competition and leisure riding.

== Registration ==
The Icelandic horse is represented by associations in 22 countries, with the International Federation of Icelandic Horse Associations (FEIF) serving as a governing international parent organization. The FEIF was founded on 25 May 1969, with six countries as original members: Austria, Denmark, Germany, Iceland, the Netherlands, and Switzerland. France and Norway joined in 1971, and Belgium and Sweden in 1975. Later, Finland, Canada, Great Britain, the United States, Faroe Islands, Luxembourg, Italy, Slovenia, Liechtenstein, Hungary, Australia and Ireland became members, but Ireland subsequently left because of a lack of members. New Zealand has been given the status of "associate member" as its membership base is small. In 2000, WorldFengur was established as the official FEIF registry for Icelandic horses. The registry is a web database program that is used as a studbook to track the history and bloodlines of the Icelandic breed. The registry contains information on the pedigree, breeder, owner, offspring, photo, breeding evaluations and assessments, and unique identification of each horse registered. The database was established by the Icelandic government in cooperation with the FEIF. Since its inception, around 300,000 Icelandic horses, living and dead, have been registered worldwide. The Islandpferde-Reiter- und Züchterverband is an organization of German riders and breeders of Icelandic horses and the association of all Icelandic horse clubs in Germany.
