= Organized horse fighting =

Horse fighting betting sport

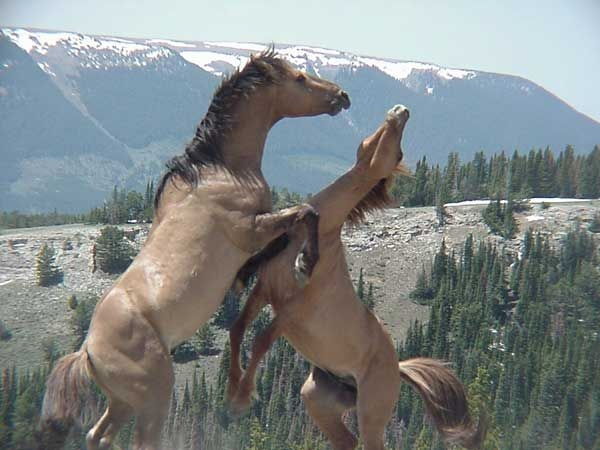
Horses fight in the wild. However, contests between stallions are sometimes organized by humans for entertainment.

Organized horse fighting is a blood sport between two stallions which is organized for the purposes of betting or entertainment. Although combat between horses occurs naturally in the wild, death or serious injury in naturally occurring animal fights is almost always avoided by ritualized behaviours or the withdrawal of one of the combatants.

Fights often take place in a fenced ring, which prevents the more submissive stallion from retreating, as it would do in a naturally occurring contest. Two stallions and a mare in heat are brought into the ring by human handlers. The mare is then removed, but kept in the vicinity so that her scent lingers, although in some fights she is tethered to a pole at the center of the ring. At this point, the stallions will often spontaneously attack each other. Those who do not are whipped or startled with loud noises to provoke them into a frenzy. Horse fights may be staged in rounds, or as one-off bouts. These fights often result in significant injuries, or death, of the stallions, because the combatants have no ability to withdraw. Horse fights may last between 15 minutes to three hours and have been criticized for their brutality and violence. Defenders of organized horse fighting have claimed that the death of horses in organized horse fighting is rare or non-existent, and implied that this makes fighting bans unnecessary.

Organized horse fighting is a traditional observance of Chinese New Year among the Miao people that has occurred for more than 500 years. Though illegal according to national law, it is also widely practiced in the island of Mindanao in the Philippines where, as of 2008, approximately 1,000 horses were being bred annually for horse fights. Organized horse fighting has also been recorded in Thailand, in South Korea's Jeju Province, on Muna Island in Indonesia, and among medieval Norse settlers in Iceland, where it was known as hestavíg.
