= Marilyn Stokstad =

American art historian

- Born: Marilyn Jane Stokstad; February 16, 1929; Lansing, Michigan, United States
- Died: March 4, 2016 (aged 87); Lawrence, Kansas, United States
- Occupations: Art historian Educator; Curator

Academic background
- Education: Carleton College; Michigan State University; University of Michigan
- Thesis: The Portico de la Gloria of the Cathedral of Santiago de Compostela (1957)
- Doctoral advisor: Harold Wethey

Academic work
- Discipline: Art history
- Sub-discipline: Medieval and Spanish art
- Influenced: Charles C. Eldredge

Marilyn Jane Stokstad (February 16, 1929 – March 4, 2016) was an American art historian, educator, and curator. A scholar of medieval and Spanish art, Stokstad was Judith Harris Murphy Distinguished Professor of Art History Emeritus at the University of Kansas, and also served as director of the Spencer Museum of Art.

== Career ==
Born in Lansing to Olaf and Edythe Gardiner, Stokstad received a Bachelor of Arts in Art History from Carleton College in 1950. Her honors thesis was on Greek Revival architecture in Michigan. She then earned a Master of Arts in Art History from Michigan State University in 1953, studying Norwegian art and writing a thesis titled "Norwegian Mural Painting from 1910 to 1950". She was then awarded a Doctor of Philosophy from the University of Michigan in 1957. Her doctoral dissertation was on the Portico of Glory of the Santiago de Compostela, and was supervised by Harold Wethey.

In the year after receiving her doctoral degree, Stokstad was hired as assistant professor of art history at the University of Kansas. In 1961, she also served as director of the Spencer Museum of Art, until 1968. In 1962, Stokstad was promoted to the professorial rank of associate, and also became department chair. She gained full professorship in 1966.

Stokstad stepped down from serving as department chair in 1972 in order to become associate dean of the College of Arts and Sciences, until 1976. She then served as president of the College Art Association from 1978 to 1980. In that final year, Stokstad was given the title of university distinguished professor of art history, and in 1994, the post was endowed by Judith Harris Murphy. In 2002, Stokstad retired from teaching and was named emeritus.

== Legacy ==
Stokstad died in Lawrence in 2016. Upon her death, she bequeathed over one million dollars to support the art history program at the University of Kansas, as well as the Spencer Museum, bringing her total donations to over two million. The directorship of the Spencer Museum is also named after Stokstad. Shortly after her death, Time magazine named Stokstad one of the most-read female authors by students in colleges within the United States.

== See also ==
- List of Carleton College people
- List of Michigan State University people
- List of University of Kansas people
- List of University of Michigan arts alumni
