= Islandpferde-Reiter- und Züchterverband =

LOGO of the IPZV

The Islandpferde-Reiter- und Züchterverband e.V. (IPZV e.V.) is an organisation for the German riders and breeders of Icelandic horses and the association of all Icelandic horse-clubs of Germany. The IPZV was founded in 1958 and is - with more than 25.000 members and about 70.000 registered horses in Germany - the biggest association of Icelandic horses worldwide. The IPZV is member of the International Icelandic horse Federation. (FEIF).

== Sources ==
- Míček, Tomáš; Schrenk, Hans-Jörg: Icelandic ponies, Milwaukee 1995 ISBN 0-8368-1370-7
- Rostock, Andrea-Katharina; Feldmann, Walter: Islandpferde Reitlehre : Leitfaden für Haltung, Ausbildung und Reiten von Islandpferden und anderen Freizeitpferderassen; Bad Honnef 1988
- IPZV, Verabschiedete Satzung, gemäß IPZV-Mitgliederversammlung vom 12. März 2005; geändert durch die IPZV-Mitgliederversammlung vom 19. April 2008 from_21.htm pdf
