= Anita Barbee =

American psychologist and social worker

Anita P. Barbee PhD, MSSW
- Born: Tallahassee, Florida, U.S.
- Citizenship: United States
- Education: Agnes Scott College (BA); University of Georgia (MA, PhD); University of Louisville (MSSW)
- Known for: Social support processes, relationship maintenance, healthy relationship education, child welfare interventions
- Spouse: Michael Cunningham
- Scientific career
- Fields: Social psychology, Social work
- Workplaces: University of Louisville
- Thesis: The Effects of Positive and Negative Moods on the Cheering Up Process in Close Relationships (1988)
- Doctoral advisor: David Shaffer
- Website: www.anitabarbee.com

Anita P. Barbee is an American psychologist and social worker. She is a professor, Distinguished University Scholar, and the PhD program director at the University of Louisville Kent School of Social Work and Family Science.

== Education ==
Barbee completed a Bachelor of Arts in English and psychology at Agnes Scott College in 1982. She then pursued graduate study at the University of Georgia, earning a Master of Arts in 1985 and a PhD in social psychology, with a specialization in child and family studies, in 1988. Her doctoral dissertation received the Dissertation Award from the International Association for Relationship Research (IARR) in 1989. She later earned a Master of Science in Social Work (MSSW) from the University of Louisville in 2001.

== Career and research ==
Barbee joined the University of Louisville in 1986 as an adjunct professor and director of the social psychology lab in the Department of Psychological and Brain Sciences, moving to the Kent School of Social Work in 1993 as an assistant research professor before becoming a tenured professor and Distinguished University Scholar there in 2005.

Her research examines close relationships, relationship initiation, and social support communications. Barbee studies community-engaged interventions aimed at healthy relationship education. She evaluates programs like Love Notes, which target positive youth development among youth living in challenging contexts, including those who are or have been system-involved (e.g., child welfare, juvenile justice) as well as immigrant and refugee youth. Her work analyzes how relationship education affects dating violence, risky sexual behavior, teen pregnancy rates, and suicidality among youth in urban areas.

Barbee researches child welfare organizational structures. She designs, implements, and evaluates workforce interventions designed to address staff recruitment and hiring, onboarding and training, job redesign, supervision, use of technology, organizational context, and secondary traumatic stress to improve retention and practice among front-line child welfare workers. She served as the evaluation lead for the federal Quality Improvement Center for Workforce Development (QIC-WD) from 2016 to 2023. Her studies investigate factors affecting the social support provided by child welfare supervisors to employees managing exposure to traumatizing events. She develops and evaluates strategies to improve practice through the use of practice models and to reduce racial disparities in the treatment of children and youth within child welfare agencies. She serves on the editorial boards of several academic journals, including the Journal of Public Child Welfare, Families in Society, and PLOS ONE.

She has secured over $50 million in extramural grant funding for the University of Louisville from organizations including the Administration for Children and Families (ACF), the Children's Bureau, the Child Care Bureau, the Family and Youth Services Bureau, the Office of Adolescent Health, and the Substance Abuse and Mental Health Services Administration (SAMHSA). She was the president of the International Association for Relationship Research from 2018 to 2020, following a term as president-elect from 2016. She currently serves on the board of directors as treasurer of the American Academy of Social Work and Social Welfare.

== Awards and honors ==
Barbee received the Miller Early Career Award in Personal Relationships from the IARR in 1997. The University of Louisville awarded her the Outstanding Scholarship, Research and Creative Activity Award in the Social Sciences in 2003, named her a Distinguished University Scholar in 2005, and gave her its Distinguished Career of Service Award in 2019. She received the National Staff Development and Training Association Lifetime Achievement Award from the American Public Human Services Association in 2007, and its Career Achievement Award in 2014. She was elected to fellow status in the American Psychological Association (Division 9: Society for the Psychological Study of Social Issues) in 2000 and invited to join the Society of Experimental Social Psychologists in 2017.

She holds fellow status in the American Psychological Association, the Society for Social Work and Research (SSWR), and the American Academy of Social Work and Social Welfare. She is a past president of the Junior League of Louisville. The University of Louisville named her a Wilson Wyatt Alumni Fellow in 2024.
