= Kathy Hudson =

American microbiologist

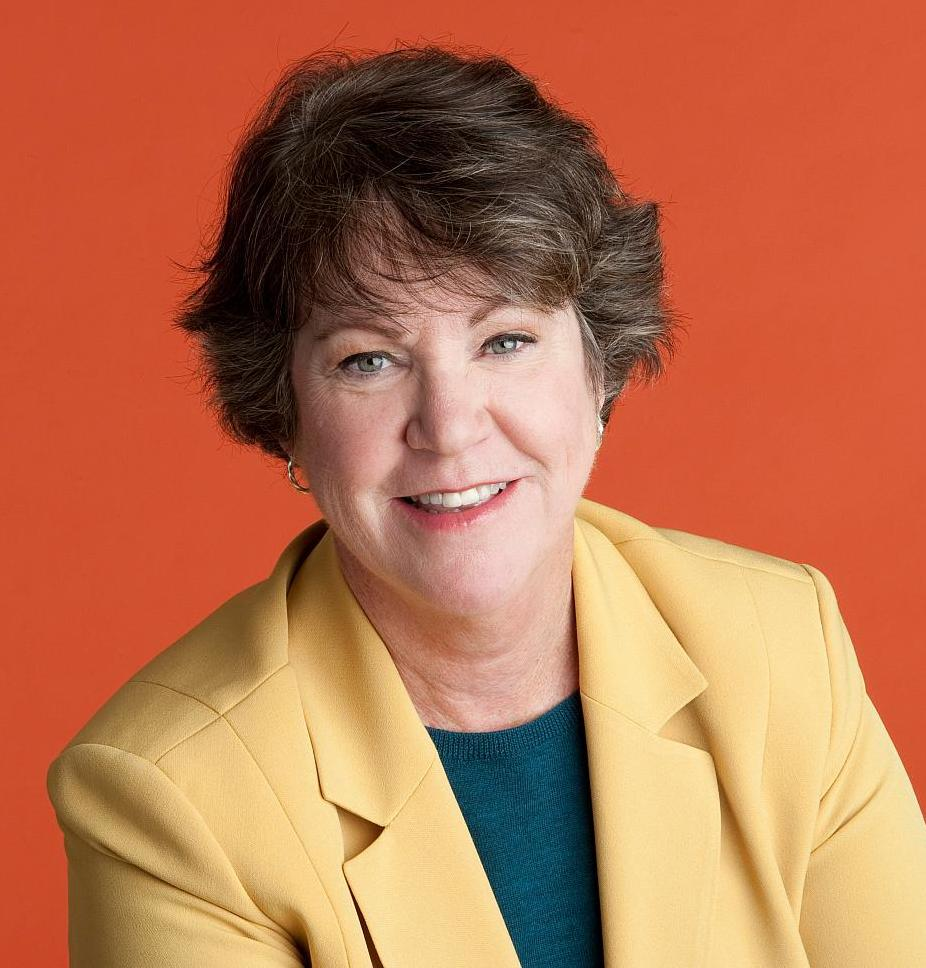
- Hudson in 2016
- Born: Kathy Lynn Hudson
- Education: Carleton College; University of Chicago; University of California, Berkeley
- Known for: All of Us; BRAIN Initiative
- Scientific career
- Fields: Microbiology
- Workplaces: Johns Hopkins University; National Institutes of Health
- Thesis: Molecular Genetic Analysis of the Drosophila Toll Gene (1989)

Kathy Lynn Hudson is an American microbiologist specializing in science policy. She was the deputy director for science, outreach, and policy at the National Institutes of Health from October 2010 to January 2017. Hudson assisted in the creation and launch of All of Us, the BRAIN initiative, and the National Center for Advancing Translational Sciences. She founded the Genetics and Public Policy Center at Johns Hopkins University in 2002. Hudson is an advocate for women in science.

== Education ==
Hudson completed a B.A. in biology at Carleton College in 1982. She earned a M.S. in microbiology from the University of Chicago. Hudson completed a Ph.D. in molecular biology at the University of California, Berkeley. Her 1989 dissertation was titled, Molecular Genetic Analysis of the Drosophila Toll Gene.

== Career ==
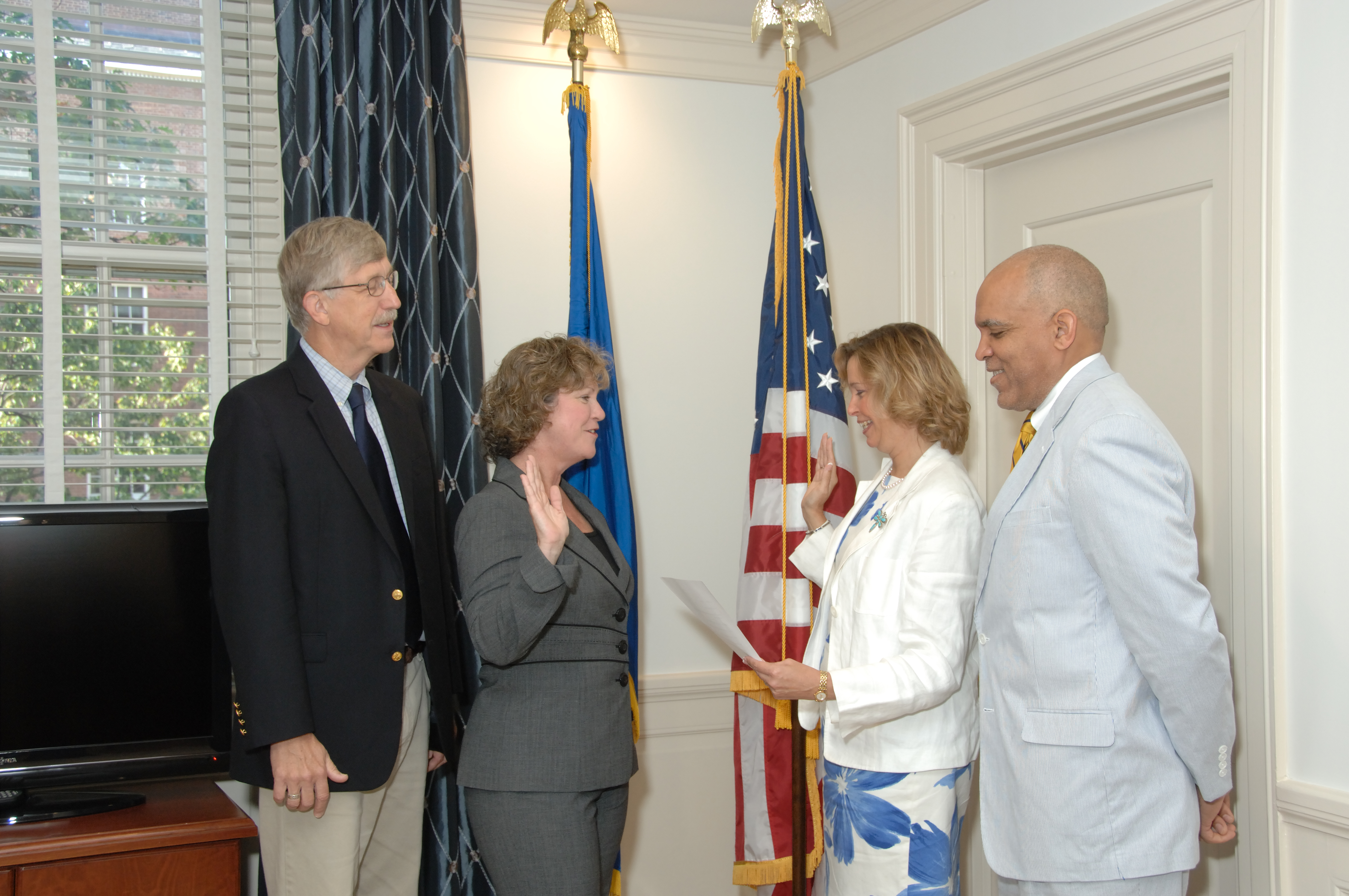
Hudson swearing in as the NIH deputy director for science, outreach and policy with Francis Collins, Chistine Major and Raynard Kington

Hudson was an American Association for the Advancement of Science Science and Technology Fellow, working for the United States House Committee on Agriculture and then the Office of Technology Assessment. She joined the National Human Genome Research Institute (NHGRI), where she served as assistant director from 1995 to 2002. At NHGRI, Hudson made the case to scientists, public policy experts, and lawmakers about the need for federal legislation to guard against genetic discrimination. She presided over the announcement of the completion of a draft sequence of the human genome, and helped to broker an agreement between the public and private human genome projects, which was announced by U.S. president Bill Clinton in 2000.

In 2002, Hudson left the NHGRI to found and direct the Genetics and Public Policy Center at the Johns Hopkins University (JHU), where she educated and advised on science and policy issues in genetics. At JHU, Hudson was an associate professor in the Berman Institute of Bioethics, Institute of Genetic Medicine, and department of pediatrics. Over a 12-year period, she helped assemble a team that led to the passage of the Genetic Information Nondiscrimination Act in 2008.

In 2008, Hudson became the chief of staff of the National Institutes of Health (NIH), working with director Francis Collins. She subsequently became deputy director for science, outreach, and policy from October 24, 2010, to January 2, 2017. In those capacities, Hudson assisted in restructuring the NIH including the founding and launch of the National Center for Advancing Translational Sciences (NCATS). She assisted in the creation and launch of All of Us and the BRAIN initiative. Hudson led efforts to revise and update the Common Rule for human subjects research, to modernize clinical trial reporting, to expand data sharing, and to develop oversight for areas of medical research including stem cells, chimeras, and gene editing. She is an advocate for women in science. She mentored a group of young women working biomedical research and policy initiatives.

== Awards and honors ==
In 2019, Hudson was awarded a Doctor of Science, honoris causa from her alma mater, Carleton College.

== Selected works ==
- Hudson, Kathy L.; Rothenberg, Karen H.; Andrews, Lori B.; Kahn, Mary Jo Ellis; Collins, Francis S. (1995). "Genetic Discrimination and Health Insurance: An Urgent Need for Reform". Science. 270 (5235): 391–393. Bibcode:1995Sci...270..391H. doi:10.1126/science.270.5235.391. ISSN 0036-8075. JSTOR 2889050. PMID 7569991. S2CID 14884973.
- Hudson, Kathy L.; Holohan, M.K.; Collins, Francis S. (June 2008). "Keeping Pace with the Times — The Genetic Information Nondiscrimination Act of 2008". New England Journal of Medicine. 358 (25): 2661–2663. doi:10.1056/NEJMp0803964. ISSN 0028-4793. PMID 18565857.
- Hudson, Kathy L. (September 2011). Feero, W. Gregory; Guttmacher, Alan E. (eds.). "Genomics, Health Care, and Society". New England Journal of Medicine. 365 (11): 1033–1041. doi:10.1056/NEJMra1010517. ISSN 0028-4793. PMID 21916641.
- Hudson, Kathy L.; Collins, Francis S. (January 2015). "Sharing and Reporting the Results of Clinical Trials". JAMA. 313 (4): 355–356. doi:10.1001/jama.2014.10716. ISSN 0098-7484. PMC 5101953. PMID 25408371.
- Hudson, Kathy L.; Lauer, Michael S.; Collins, Francis S. (October 2016). "Toward a New Era of Trust and Transparency in Clinical Trials". JAMA. 316 (13): 1353–1354. doi:10.1001/jama.2016.14668. ISSN 0098-7484. PMC 5101947. PMID 27636028.
