= Horse genome =

DNA profile of a horse

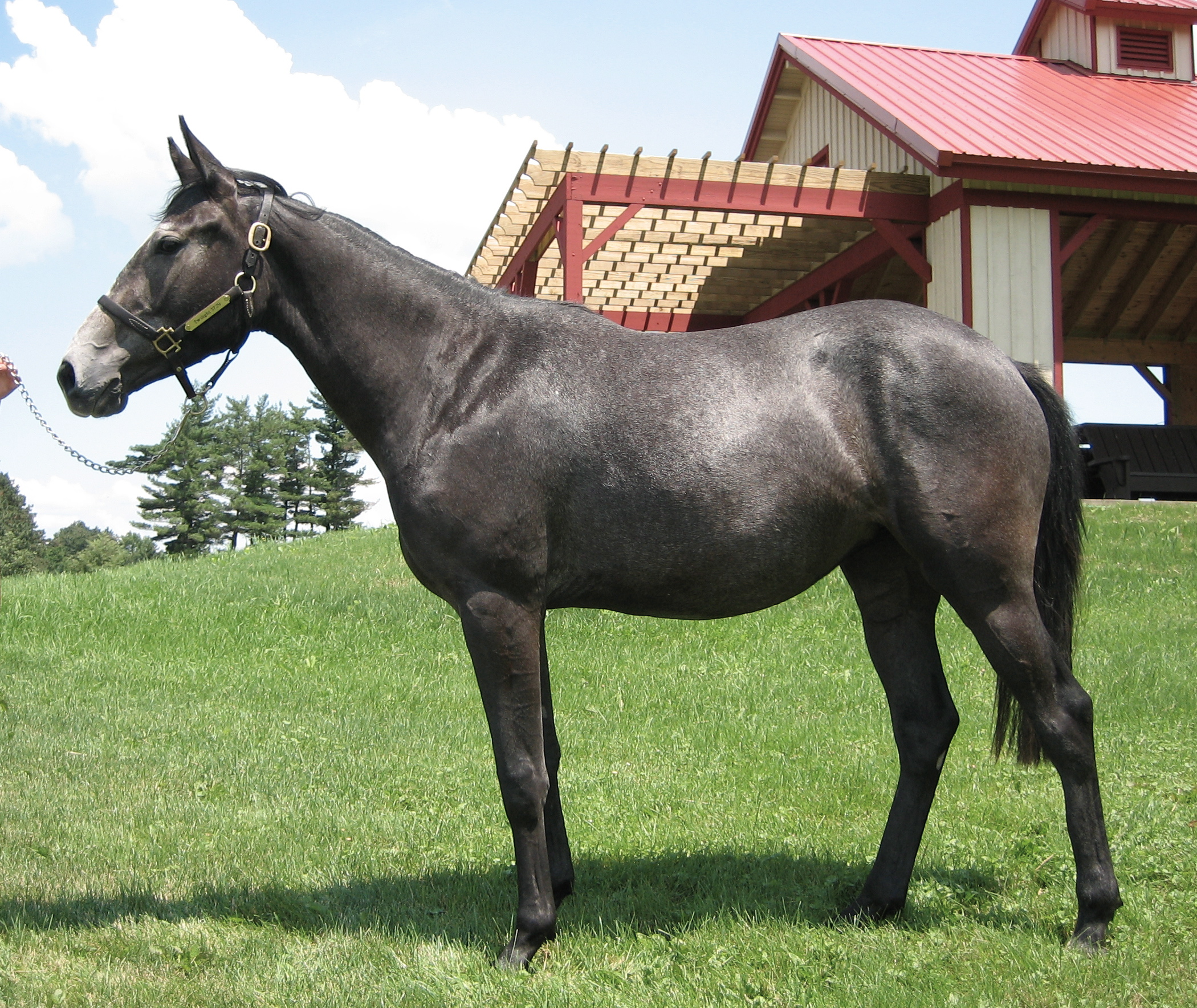
Twilight, the Thoroughbred mare who was the first horse to have its genome fully sequenced

The horse genome was first sequenced in 2006. The Horse Genome Project mapped 2.7 billion DNA base pairs, and released the full map in 2009. The horse genome is larger than the dog genome, but smaller than the human genome or the bovine genome. It encompasses 31 pairs of autosomes and one sex chromosome pair.

As horses share over 90 hereditary diseases similar to those found in humans, the sequencing of the horse genome has potential applications to both equine and human health. Further, nearly half of the chromosomes in the horse genome show conserved synteny with a human chromosome, far more than between dogs and humans. This is a high degree of conserved synteny and may help researchers use insights from one species to illuminate the other. Mapping the horse genome may also assist in the development of expression arrays to improve treatment of equine lameness, lung disease, reproduction, and immunology. Research also has provided new insights to the development of centromeres.

The $15 million project was funded by National Human Genome Research Institute (NHGRI) of the National Institutes of Health (NIH). Additional funding came from the Dorothy Russell Havemeyer Foundation, the Volkswagen Foundation, the Morris Animal Foundation and the Programmi di Ricerca Scientifica di Rilevante Interesse Nazionale.

Researchers on the project included Kerstin Lindblad-Toh at the Eli and Edythe L. Broad Institute of the Massachusetts Institute of Technology and Harvard University, Ottmar Distl and Tosso Leeb from the University of Veterinary Medicine, in Hanover, Germany and Helmut Blöcker from the Helmholtz Centre for Infection Research in Braunschweig, Germany, and Doug Antczak of Cornell University.

The first horse to have its genome fully sequenced, in 2006–2007, was a Thoroughbred mare named Twilight, donated by Cornell University. Other breeds used to contribute to the initial map of horse genetic variation included the Akhal-Teke, Andalusian, Arabian, Icelandic, American Quarter Horse, Standardbred, Belgian, Hanoverian, Hokkaido and Fjord horse. This allowed creation of a catalogue of one million single nucleotide polymorphisms (SNPs) to compare genetic variation within and between different breeds.

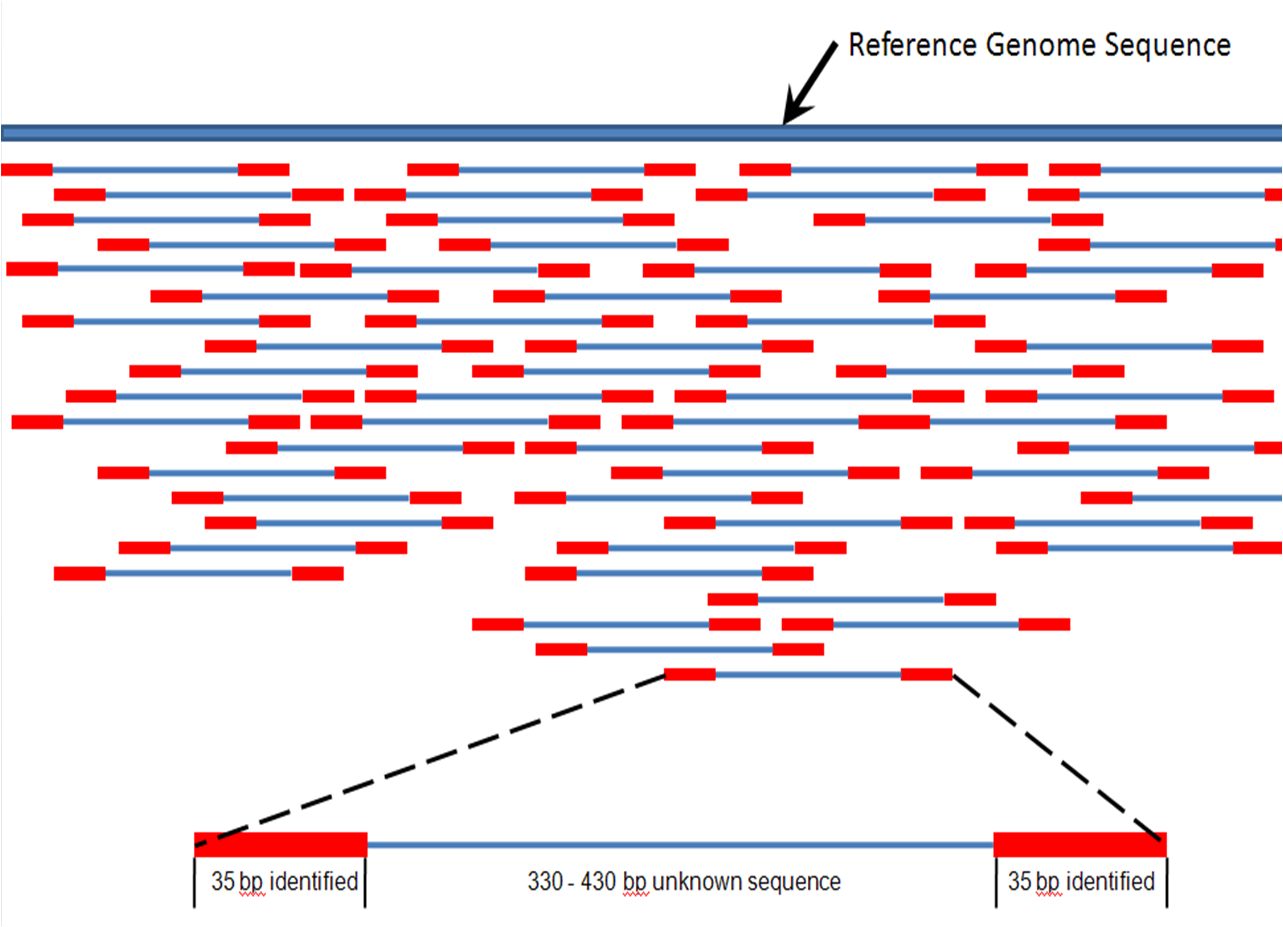
Next generation sequencing example

In 2012, a second horse was fully sequenced at Texas A&M University, an 18-year-old Quarter Horse mare named Sugar. Sugar's genome, sequenced with newer techniques, had 3 million genetic variants from Twilight's, notably in genes governing sensory perception, signal transduction, and immunity. Researchers are in the process of sequencing the genome of seven additional horses. One stated goal of additional sequencing is to better understand the genetic basis of disease and of particular traits distinguishing individual horses and breeds in order to better predict and manage health care of horses.

One result of the mapping of the horse genome was locating the mutation that creates the Leopard complex (Lp) spotting pattern seen in breeds such as the Appaloosa. Horses homozygous for the Lp gene are also at risk for congenital stationary night blindness (CSNB). Studies in 2008 and 2010 indicated that both CSNB and leopard complex spotting patterns are linked to TRPM1. As this disorder also afflicts humans, a researcher and lead author from the Broad Institute stated, "This demonstrates the utility of the horse for disease gene mapping."

In 2012, researchers at the University of Copenhagen used next-generation sequencing to sequence four modern domesticated horses of different breeds, a Przewalski's horse, and a donkey, comparing these to DNA from three fossil horses dated between 13,000 and 50,000 years ago. As the horse was only domesticated about 4000–3500 BCE, this research was stated to "identify the starting point for horse selection and the raw genetic material our ancestors had available."

== See also ==
- Ann T. Bowling
- Genome project
- Equine coat color genetics
