= Ann T. Bowling =

American geneticist (1943–2000)

- Born: Ann Trommershausen; June 1, 1943; Portland, Oregon, US
- Died: December 8, 2000 (aged 57); Davis, California, US
- Education: Carleton College; UC Davis
- Known for: The Genetics of the Horse (2000); Horse Genetics (1997)
- Spouse: Michael Bowling
- Children: 1
- Scientific career
- Fields: Genetics
- Workplaces: University of California, Davis
- Thesis: A morphological, histological, and biochemical study of the tomato mutant 'curl' (1969)
- Doctoral advisor: G. Ledyard Stebbins

Ann Trommershausen Bowling (June 1, 1943 – December 8, 2000) was an American scientist who was one of the world's leading geneticists in the study of horses, conducting research in the areas of molecular genetics and cytogenetics. She was a major figure in the development of testing to determine animal parentage, first with blood typing in the 1980s and then DNA testing in the 1990s. She later became known for her studies of hereditary diseases in horses and equine coat color genetics, as well as research on horse evolution and the development of horse breeds. She studied the population genetics of feral horses, did considerable work to help preserve the Przewalski's horse, and was one of the founding members of the international project to map the horse genome. She was an adjunct professor at the University of California, Davis (UCD), and at the time of her death in 2000 was the executive associate director of the Veterinary Genetics Laboratory (VGL) there. Her unexpected death on December 8, 2000, at age 57 was attributed to a massive stroke.

== Early life and career ==
Ann Bowling (née Trommershausen) was born June 1, 1943, in Portland, Oregon, to Claire Bowen and William Ernest Trommershausen, who worked for the Bonneville Power Administration. After the Trommershausens moved to Boulder, Colorado, Ann attended Boulder High School and was class valedictorian. She obtained her undergraduate degree at Carleton College in Minnesota, graduating magna cum laude.

She earned her PhD in 1969 at the University of California, Davis, completing her thesis on the genetics of plants under the supervision of G. Ledyard Stebbins. She joined the faculty of Occidental College in Los Angeles in 1968, then was hired by UC Davis in 1973, and at the time of her death in 2000 was an adjunct professor and executive associate director of the Veterinary Genetics Laboratory (VGL) at UC Davis.

She married Michael Bowling in 1981. The Bowlings shared a strong interest in genetics; prior to their marriage, Ann used Michael's stud book research in her own 1980 study of genetic diseases. Michael Bowling wrote a number of articles on Arabian horse genetics for general-interest publications, (Note: Michael Bowling's work has included, but is not limited to study of SCID, preservation breeding, genetic diseases in horses generally, and Crabbet Arabian bloodlines.) and the pair collaborated on a study of mtDNA in Arabian bloodlines. Their daughter Lydia attended veterinary school and UC Davis and became a veterinarian.

== Animal parentage identification ==
Bowling developed some of the first blood typing and DNA parentage tests for horses, and became a genetics consultant to several horse breed registries, including The Jockey Club, Arabian Horse Association (originally Arabian Horse Registry of America), American Quarter Horse Association, and the American Morgan Horse Association. Beginning in 1976, she published research on animal blood types, and developed tests using blood type to establish parentage. She advocated for adopting blood typing for parentage verification of registered animals. Numerous breed registries did so. In the course of this research, she also studied the phenomenon of chimerism, which sometimes created inconsistent results in parentage testing.

By the late 1990s, as the science of parentage testing evolved, she researched the effectiveness of DNA typing and concluded that it was as effective as blood typing for verifying parentage. Her lab pioneered the DNA-based parentage verification of horses and camelids —species for which Bowling herself had conducted research (Note: see, e.g. Juneja, RK; Penedo, MC; Larsson, HE; Gahne, B; Bowling, AT (1989). "Two-dimensional electrophoresis of the plasma proteins of alpacas and llamas: genetic polymorphism of alpha 1B-glycoprotein and three other proteins". Animal Genetics. 20 (4): 395–406. doi:10.1111/j.1365-2052.1989.tb00895.x. PMID 2619106.; Penedo, MC; Fowler, ME; Bowling, AT; Anderson, DL; Gordon, L (1988). "Genetic variation in the blood of llamas, Llama glama, and alpacas, Llama pacos". Animal Genetics. 19 (3): 267–76. doi:10.1111/j.1365-2052.1988.tb00815.x. PMID 3207220.)—using microsatellites as biomarkers. This testing program also expanded to include eight other types of mammals.

Bowling applied her work on identifying parentage to help preserve the genetic diversity of the Przewalski's horse. Among other work, she reconstructed the herd book of the captive Askania Nova herd in Ukraine using parentage testing data. She studied the genetics of Mustangs in the Great Basin and located genetic markers linking them to other domesticated horse breeds. She also performed research on the blood types of the Paso Fino breed.

Some of the more unusual work the VGL performed was a 1996 investigation by Scotland Yard, which sought help from the lab to identify the source of a blood sample associated with a murder. The lab identified the sample as being from a dog that was at the crime scene, and this information helped crack the case by leading investigators to a suspect who was the owner of the dog. Bowling was the director of the laboratory at the time, and as a result of this work, expanded the lab's scope so it could continue to help identify animals present at crime scenes and those animals which themselves were victims of crimes such as theft or animal abuse. From this beginning, the VGL also later helped create a national canine database used to prosecute cases of dogfighting. Bowling also published articles on parentage in mules, including a case where she proved the rare occurrence of a fertile mule mare by parentage testing. (Note: see, e.g. Ryder, OA; Chemnick, LG; Bowling, AT; Benirschke, K (September–October 1985). "Male mule foal qualifies as the offspring of a female mule and jack donkey". The Journal of Heredity. 76 (5): 379–81. PMID 4056372.; Bowling, AT; Nickel, LS (January–February 1985). "Inheritance of Equus asinus serum albumin variants in hybrid offspring". The Journal of Heredity. 76 (1): 73–4. doi:10.1093/oxfordjournals.jhered.a110028. PMID 3980976.)

== Genetic disease and equine coat color research ==
From very early in her career, Bowling wrote about educating horse breeders on genetic diseases in purebred animals and how to deal with these conditions. She performed a number of studies on the Arabian horse breed, including research into one of the genetic diseases that affects Arabians, cerebellar abiotrophy (CA). In 1985, she created a breeding herd at UCD of horses known to carry CA, and this small group provided preliminary DNA data for researchers. Bowling's own studies of CA were unpublished at the time of her death, but she is credited with demonstrating that the condition had a recessive mode of genetic inheritance and was likely the result of a single mutated allele. A DNA marker test for the condition was developed by her successors at UCD, which became available to the public in 2008. In 2011, the causative mutation for cerebellar abiotrophy was identified, and the condition was conclusively established as an autosomal recessive.

Bowling also studied genetic conditions in other horse breeds, including hyperkalemic periodic paralysis (HYPP) in the American Quarter Horse. In 1996, her research found that the origin of this genetically dominant disorder traced to a single stallion, later identified publicly as Impressive.

Bowling's study of equine coat color genetics originally coincided with her studies of animal parentage. (Note: Bowling originally sought to verify if foals recorded as having genetically impossible coat colors given their parentage were due to recordkeeping errors by breed registries.) Research related to equine coat colors dovetailed with genetic disease research when she studied overo spotting patterns seen in Paint horses. She was part of a research team that studied lethal white syndrome (LWS), a fatal condition in newborn foals. She had authored an early study in 1977 that ruled out neonatal isoerythrolysis as a cause of death. In 1983, the team linked LWS to a coat color spotting pattern, later identified as frame overo, which is seen in the American Paint Horse and related breeds. In 1997 Bowling was one of three researchers to identify the gene responsible for LWS, and in the process identified the condition as the equine version of Hirschsprung disease.

While researching lethal white syndrome, Bowling also studied the phenomenon of cropouts; spotted offspring born from two minimally-marked parents. She also worked with the team that mapped the cream gene, which is a dilution gene with no deleterious effects, though a misconception exists that cream colors might be linked to lethal white syndrome.

In addition to her work on deleterious mutations associated with horse genetics, Bowling studied genetic disorders in the Australian Shepherd dog that appeared to be linked to the merle coat color.

== Horse genome project ==
In the 1990s, Bowling was one of the leaders in the horse genome project. This work was also important to human medicine, as there are at least 90 genetic conditions that can affect both humans and horses. The horse genome was first sequenced in 2006, and was fully mapped by 2009.

== Horse breeding ==
Bowling owned Arabian horses, and was a co-founder of the New Albion Stud along with her husband Michael and her parents, Bill and Claire Trommershausen. Ann and her parents had owned half-Arabians when they lived in Colorado; Michael Bowling had owned Arabians since 1962. They started the farm in September 1980, about the same time that Ann and Michael married, and placed an emphasis on bloodlines descended from the Crabbet Arabian Stud. The farm continued to be operated by her husband and daughter after Bowling's death. Bowling's study of mitochondrial DNA in Arabians found that pedigree records kept by the American registry for Arabian horses were generally reliable from the time of importation forward. But her work also brought into question a belief commonly held by Arabian breeders that horses imported from the desert identified by specific historic dam lines or "strains" in their pedigrees actually traced to specific matrilineal groups. Bowling also found that some mare lines claimed to originate from the same desert-bred "strain" were not related at all, and some mares whose pedigrees claimed they were of different strains turned out to be distantly related.

== Publications ==
Bowling was the author or coauthor of two books and 93 scientific journal articles, including:

Books

- Bowling, Ann T. (1997). Horse Genetics (Repr. ed.). Wallingford: CAB International. ISBN 978-0-85199-101-6.
- Bowling, A.T.; Ruvinsky, A. (2000). The Genetics of the Horse. Wallingford: CAB International. ISBN 978-0-85199-925-8.

Journals

- Guérin, G; Bailey, E; Bernoco, D; Anderson, I; Antczak, DF; Bell, K; Biros, I; Bjørnstad, G; Bowling, AT; Brandon, R; Caetano, AR; Cholewinski, G; Colling, D; Eggleston, M; Ellis, N; Flynn, J; Gralak, B; Hasegawa, T; Ketchum, M; Lindgren, G; Lyons, LA; Millon, LV; Mariat, D; Murray, J; Neau, A; Røed, K; Sandberg, K; Skow, LC; Tammen, I; Tozaki, T; Van Dyk, E; Weiss, B; Young, A; Ziegle, J (June 2003). "The second generation of the International Equine Gene Mapping Workshop half-sibling linkage map". Animal Genetics. 34 (3): 161–8. doi:10.1046/j.1365-2052.2003.00973.x. PMID 12755815.
- Bowling, AT; Zimmermann, W; Ryder, O; Penado, C; Peto, S; Chemnick, L; Yasinetskaya, N; Zharkikh, T (2003). "Genetic variation in Przewalski's horses, with special focus on the last wild caught mare, 231 Orlitza III". Cytogenetic and Genome Research. 102 (1–4): 226–34. doi:10.1159/000075754. PMID 14970708. S2CID 6085348.
- Shiue, Y-L; Millon, LV; Skow, LC; Honeycutt, D; Murray, JD; Bowling, AT (2000). "Synteny and regional marker order assignment of 26 type I and microsatellite markers to the horse X- and Y-chromosomes". Chromosome Research. 8 (1): 45–55. doi:10.1023/A:1009275102977. PMID 10730588. S2CID 11301582.
- Caetano, AR; Shiue, YL; Lyons, LA; O'Brien, SJ; Laughlin, TF; Bowling, AT; Murray, JD (December 1999). "A comparative gene map of the horse (Equus caballus)". Genome Research. 9 (12): 1239–49. doi:10.1101/gr.9.12.1239. PMC 311003. PMID 10613847.
- Caetano, Alexandre R.; Pomp, Daniel; Murray, James D.; Bowling, Ann T. (March 1999). "Comparative mapping of 18 equine type I genes assigned by somatic cell hybrid analysis". Mammalian Genome. 10 (3): 271–276. doi:10.1007/s003359900985. PMID 10051323. S2CID 24716859.
- Metallinos, DL; Bowling, AT; Rine, J (June 1998). "A missense mutation in the endothelin-B receptor gene is associated with Lethal White Foal Syndrome: an equine version of Hirschsprung disease". Mammalian Genome. 9 (6): 426–31. doi:10.1007/s003359900790. PMID 9585428. S2CID 19536624.
- Shiue, YL; Bickel, LA; Caetano, AR; Millon, LV; Clark, RS; Eggleston, ML; Michelmore, R; Bailey, E; Guérin, G; Godard, S; Mickelson, JR; Valberg, SJ; Murray, JD; Bowling, AT (February 1999). "A synteny map of the horse genome comprised of 240 microsatellite and RAPD markers". Animal Genetics. 30 (1): 1–9. doi:10.1046/j.1365-2052.1999.00377.x. PMID 10050277.
- Bowling, AT; Penedo, MC; Gordon, L; Bell, K (December 1993). "Equine plasminogen polymorphism: allelic frequencies in 23 breeds". Animal Genetics. 24 (6): 437–8. doi:10.1111/j.1365-2052.1993.tb00358.x. PMID 8273917.
- Trommerhausen-Smith, Ann (1980). "Aspects of Genetics and Disease in the Horse". Journal of Animal Science. 51 (5): 1087–1095. doi:10.2527/jas1980.5151087x. PMID 7009534.
