= Hestavíg =

Viking horse fighting

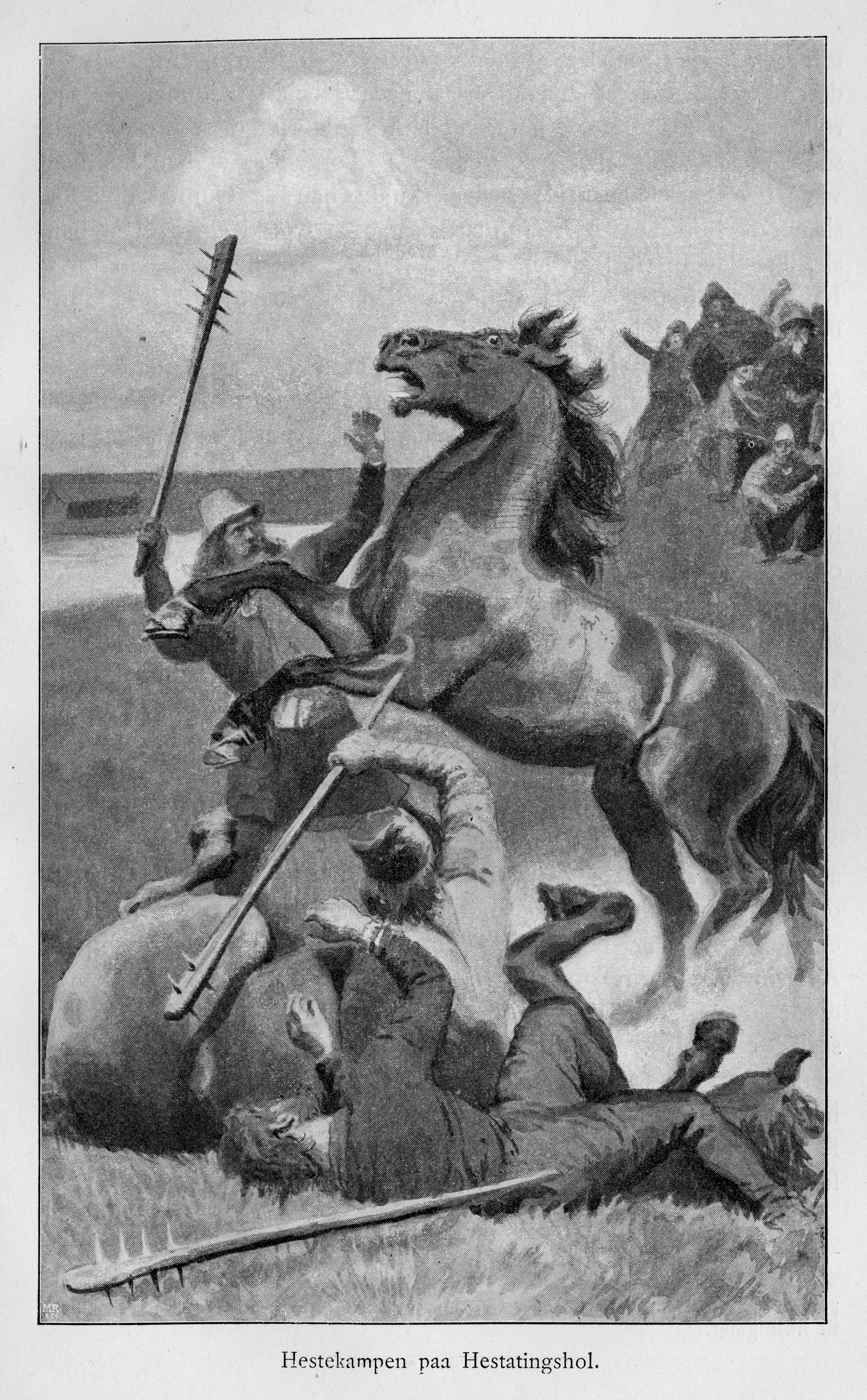
Hestavíg, Andreas Bloch (1898).

Hestavíg was an entertainment activity during the Viking Age in the Icelandic Commonwealth (930–1262), presumably a sport consisting of a brutal and bloody confrontation between two stallions, egged on by their masters, which mainly served to choose the best specimens for breeding. It was a cultural event of great importance and sometimes led to verbal and physical confrontations among the spectators. The triumph of a champion or the other could have social and political impact due to the pacts and alliances between goði (chieftains) and bóndi (homesteaders), as testified in the Norse sagas. The site where these battles were held was a neutral place used to strengthen friendship or address issues among rivals. It was also an opportunity for courtship between young couples. Sometimes rivalries raised among participants ended in bloody conflicts. Some examples appear in the Njáls saga (chapter 59) and Víga-Glúms saga (chapters 13-14).

The origin of the activity possibly came from Norway. Sometimes Icelanders exported stallions specially trained for competitions on the continent.

== Skeið ==
Skeið was another activity related to horses. It was a popular race competition from mainland Scandinavia.

== Popular culture ==
Hestavíg is featured in the Icelandic viking film In the Shadow of the Raven.
