= Robert C. Hughes =

American chemist (1940–2026)

- Born: Robert Clark Hughes; November 27, 1940; Cleveland, Ohio, U.S.
- Died: August 27, 2026 (aged 85); Albuquerque, New Mexico, U.S.
- Education: Carleton College; Stanford University
- Occupation: Chemist
- Spouse: Laura Hughes

Robert Clark Hughes (November 27, 1940 – August 27, 2026) was an American chemist.

== Early life and career ==
Hughes was born in Cleveland, Ohio on November 27, 1940, the son of Mike Everett Hughes. He attended Carleton College, earning his degree in chemistry. He also attended Stanford University, earning his PhD degree. After earning his degrees, he worked as a postdoctoral fellow at Sandia National Laboratories in Albuquerque, New Mexico.

He worked at Sandia with numerous research groups, and in 1982, he was named a fellow of the American Physical Society. He contributed to field-effect transistors, chemical sensors, temperature sensors and gas levels. In 1997, he served as senior scientist at Sandia until his retirement in 2003.

== Personal life and death ==
Hughes was married to Laura. Their marriage lasted until Hughes's death in 2026.

Hughes died in Albuquerque, New Mexico on August 27, 2026, at the age of 85.
