= Kimberly Clausing =

American economist

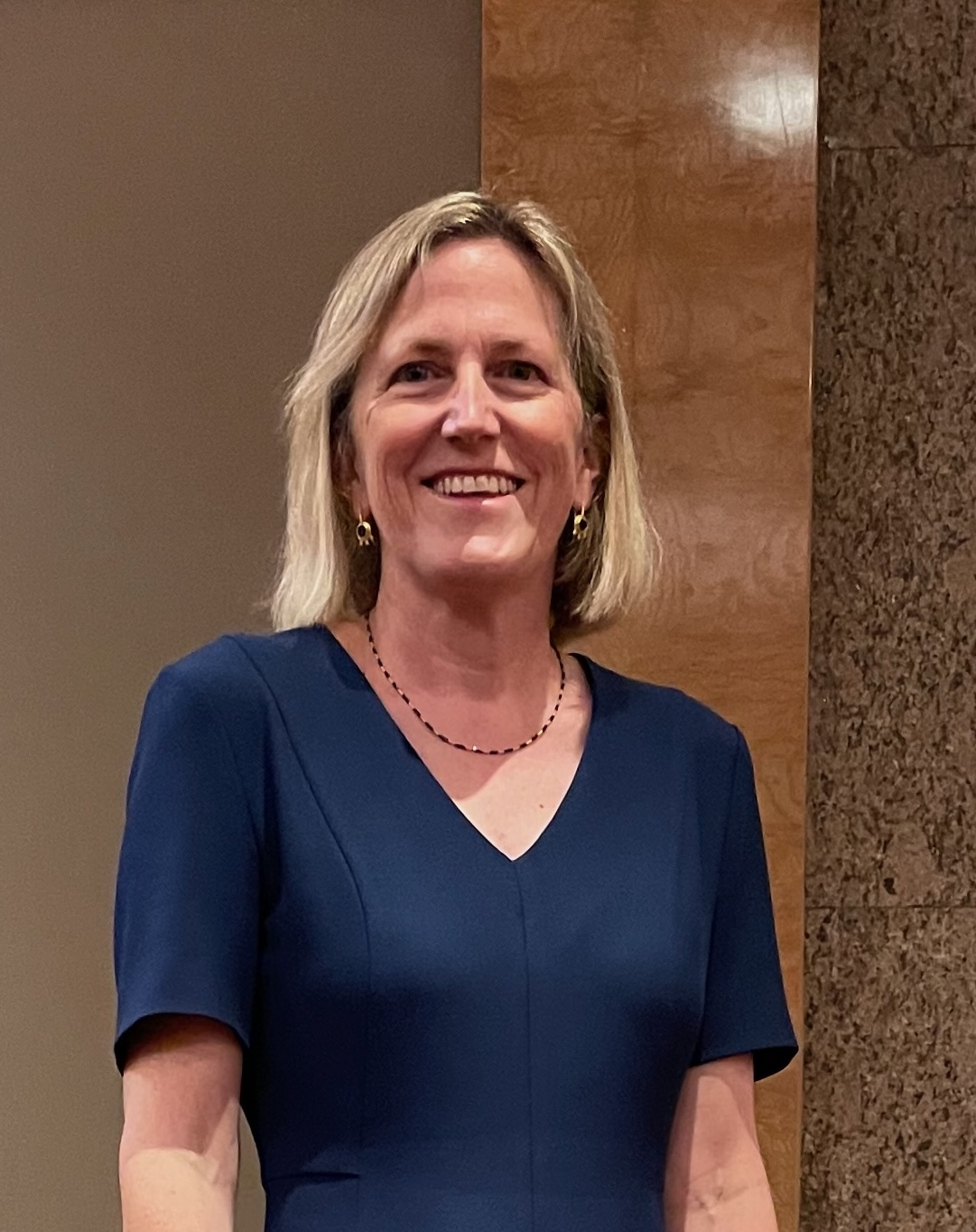
- Clausing in 2025
- Born: Urbana, Illinois, United States

Academic background
- Education: Carleton College (BA); Harvard University(MA, PhD)

Academic work
- Discipline: Tax policy, international trade
- Institutions: UCLA School of Law
- Website: Information at IDEAS / RePEc

Kimberly Clausing is an American economist. She is the Eric M. Zolt Chair in Tax Law and Policy at the UCLA School of Law and a nonresident senior fellow at the Peterson Institute for International Economics. From 2021 to 2022, she was the deputy assistant secretary for tax analysis at the United States Department of the Treasury. Clausing is known for her work on international trade and tax policy, particularly the taxation of multinational corporations.

== Education ==
Clausing graduated magna cum laude with a BA from Carleton College in 1991. She then attended Harvard University and received an MA in economics in 1993. She received her PhD in economics from Harvard in 1996 with a thesis titled Essays in International Economic Integration. From 1994 to 1995, she worked as a staff economist at the Council of Economic Advisers. After earning her PhD, at the age of 25, she started teaching economics at Reed College, eventually becoming Thormund Miller and Walter Mintz Professor of Economics. From 2006 to 2007, she was an associate professor at Wellesley College.

== Career and contributions ==
An expert on the taxation of multinational firms, Clausing studies international tax incentives, base erosion and profit shifting, tax inversion, and their connections to international trade.

She has received two Fulbright Research awards, one to the Centre for European Policy Studies in Brussels in 1999 and one to the Eastern Mediterranean University and the University of Cyprus in 2012.

Clausing has worked on economic policy research with the International Monetary Fund, the Hamilton Project, the Brookings Institution and the Tax Policy Center, and she has testified before the House Ways and Means Committee and the Senate Committee on Finance.

She criticized the 2017 Tax Cuts and Jobs Act, arguing that "the bill replies to decades of worsening income inequality with arguably the most regressive tax policy change of our lifetimes" and that "the bill answers our huge problem of multinational company profit shifting by increasing the incentive to offshore."

Clausing has provided informal policy advice to Oregon Senator Ron Wyden, a long-time supporter of tax reform. Since 2017, she has been an opinion contributor for The Hill.

In March 2019, Clausing published her first book, Open: The Progressive Case for Free Trade, Immigration, and Global Capital.

Clausing joined the faculty of the UCLA School of Law in 2021. Later that year, she was nominated and confirmed to the position of Deputy Assistant Secretary for Tax Analysis at the U.S. Department of the Treasury. She left her position at the Treasury Department in 2022.

== Selected works ==
- Clausing, Kimberly (2019). Open: The Progressive Case for Free Trade, Immigration, and Global Capital. Cambridge, Massachusetts: Harvard University Press. ISBN 978-0674919334.
- Clausing, Kimberly A.; Avi-Yonah, Reuven S. (2017). "Problems with Destination - Based Corporate Taxes and the Ryan Blueprint". Columbia Journal of Tax Law. 8 (2): 229–256.
- Clausing, Kimberly A. (December 2016). "The Effect of Profit Shifting on the Corporate Tax Base in the United States and Beyond". National Tax Journal. 69 (4): 905–934. doi:10.17310/ntj.2016.4.09. S2CID 53070736.
- Clausing, Kimberly A. (June 2016). "The U.S. State Experience under Formulary Apportionment: Are There Lessons for International Reform?". National Tax Journal. 69 (2): 353–386. doi:10.17310/ntj.2016.2.04. S2CID 53310891.
- Clausing, Kimberly A. (December 2009). "Multinational firm tax avoidance and tax policy" (PDF). National Tax Journal. 62 (4): 703–725. doi:10.17310/ntj.2009.4.06. S2CID 153354245. Archived from the original (PDF) on March 9, 2021.
- Clausing, Kimberly A. (April 2007). "Corporate tax revenues in OECD countries". International Tax and Public Finance. 14 (2): 115–133. doi:10.1007/s10797-006-7983-2. S2CID 143429098.
- Clausing, Kimberly A. (September 2003). "Tax-motivated transfer pricing and US intrafirm trade prices". Journal of Public Economics. 87 (9–10): 2207–2223. doi:10.1016/S0047-2727(02)00015-4.
- Clausing, Kimberly A. (August 2001). "Trade creation and trade diversion in the Canada - United States Free Trade Agreement". Canadian Journal of Economics. 34 (3): 677–69. doi:10.1111/0008-4085.00094.
- Clausing, Kimberly A. (April 2000). "Does multinational activity displace trade?". Economic Inquiry. 38 (2): 190–205. doi:10.1111/j.1465-7295.2000.tb00013.x.
