= Tom Freedman =

American political consultant

Tom Freedman is a consultant who served in the White House as Senior Advisor to U.S. President Bill Clinton. He continues to be an advisor to President Clinton. Freedman was also Chief of Staff for Political Strategy for the Clinton/Gore Campaign in 1996, part of a team that helped define Republican Bob Dole early in the race using a multi-million ad campaign. Freedman served as a member of the 2008 presidential Obama-Biden Transition Project on the Technology, Innovation, and Government Reform Policy Working Group. Freedman was a policy consultant for the Barack Obama presidential campaign, 2012. Today he is the President of Freedman Consulting, a strategic and policy consulting firm, and writes on public policy issues.

== Obama's transition, 2008 ==
During President Barack Obama’s transition, Freedman authored a chapter of recommendations for the next Domestic Policy Council in the Center for American Progress book Change for America: A Progressive Blueprint for the 44th President. Also, he wrote a chapter on ending child hunger in America with Joel Berg in the book Memos to the New President”.

== Early life and career ==
Previously, Mr. Freedman was Press Secretary and later Legislative Director to then Congressman Charles E. Schumer (D-NY). He co-founded with Eli Segal the non-profit organization, the Welfare to Work Partnership, which grew to include more than 20,000 companies that hired more than one million Americans off of public assistance.

A graduate of Carleton College, Mr. Freedman attended the University of California at Berkeley where he served as Editor-in-Chief of the California Law Review. In 1985, Freedman was awarded a traveling Watson Fellowship and conducted a year-long study of African famine. He has published opinion pieces in a variety of newspapers including The Christian Science Monitor, The New York Times, and The Washington Post.

== Publications ==
Some of Mr. Freedman's authored and co-authored publications include:

- “Fulfilling the President’s Call: A Partnership with States to End Hunger in America by 2015” http://www.dlc.org/documents/Freedman-Shore_Child_Hunger_050609.pdf
- “A Kindle in Every Backpack: A Proposal for eTextbooks in American Schools” http://www.dlc.org/ndol_ci.cfm?kaid=140&subid=292&contentid=255033
- “Hunger, Poverty, and Politics: What Do Voters Want?” http://alliancetoendhunger.org/pressroom/project-archives/documents/HMPReport2003-WhatDoVotersWant.pdf
- “Ending Childhood Hunger in America” http://www.dlc.org/ndol_ci.cfm?contentid=254836&kaid=450020&subid=900201
- “Helping Americans Help Themselves: Toward a National Single Stop Policy and More Efficient, More Effective Poverty Fighting” http://www.dlc.org/documents/SingleStop.pdf
- “An Electorate Ready for Action: 10 Key Findings on Hunger” http://www.alliancetoendhunger.org/pressroom/documents/HungerMessageProject2008ExitPollReport-email-printversion.pdf
