= Tsune Watanabe =

Japanese educator

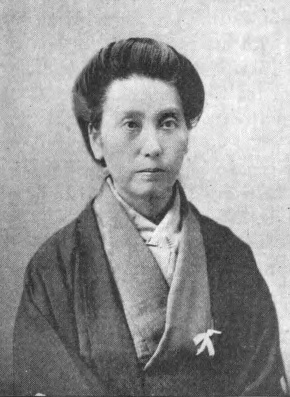
- Born: Kobe
- Other names: Watanabe Tsune, Tsuneko Watanabe, Watanabe Tsuneko
- Occupations: Church leader, educator, and temperance activist
- Years active: 1910s, 1920s
- Known for: President of the Congregational Woman's Missionary Society of Japan; active internationally with the Woman's Christian Temperance Union

Tsune Watanabe was a Japanese educator. She was president of the Congregational Woman's Missionary Society of Japan and head of the Woman's Christian Temperance Union in Kobe.

== Early life ==
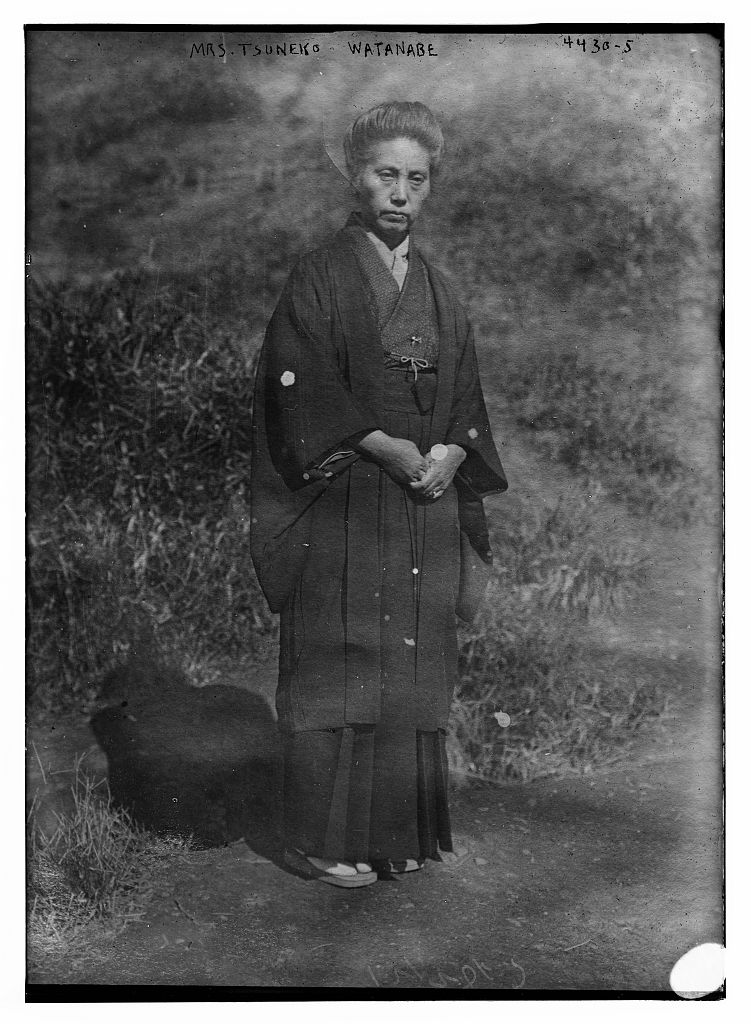
Mrs. Tsuneko Watanabe LOC 23546372123

Watanabe graduated from Kobe Girls' School in 1882, in the school's first graduating class; her teachers were American women from Carleton College. She graduated from Carleton College in 1891, the school's first non-Western graduate.

== Career ==
Watanabe was president of the Congregational Woman's Missionary Society of Japan and head of the Women's Christian Temperance Union (WCTU) in Kobe. She taught at Kobe College for ten years. In 1911 she visited Korea with American missionary Ruth Frances Davis, and organized a chapter of the Japanese WCTU in Seoul. The two women went to Taiwan in 1912 to organize Japanese WCTU chapters in Taipei and Tainan.

In 1912 she convened the fifth annual meeting of the Woman's Missionary Society at Osaka. In 1917 and 1918 she traveled to New York and Washington, D.C., for the convention of the WCTU. Although she was not ordained as a minister, she spent the winter of 1918-1919 in Santa Barbara, California, leading the small Japanese Congregational church in that city. In 1923 she went to Shanghai to start a chapter of the Japanese WCTU.
