= Michael Cunningham (psychologist) =

- Education: Carleton College, University of Minnesota
- Known for: Research on physical attractiveness and decision-making
- Spouse: Anita Barbee
- Scientific career
- Fields: Social psychology
- Institutions: University of Louisville
- Thesis: A dual process interpretation of the effects of positive mood and guilt on helping behavior (1977)

Michael Robert Cunningham is an American social psychologist and professor in the Department of Communications at the University of Louisville. He is known for his research on perceived physical attractiveness of both men and women by members of the opposite sex. He has also researched the effects of emotions like trust and guilt on financial decision-making. He is also known for his pioneering work on hand transplantation.
