= List of agnostics =

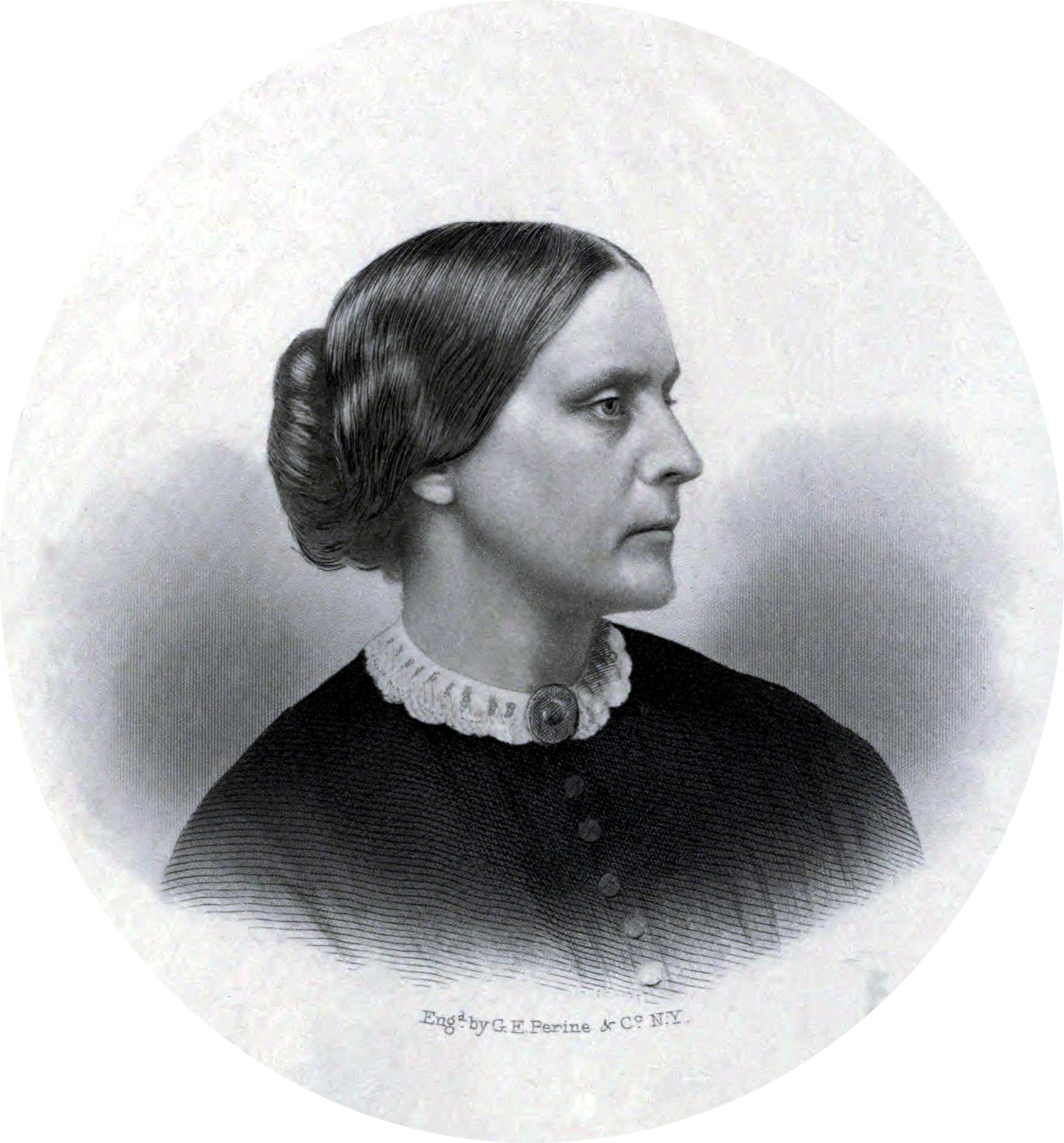
Anthony

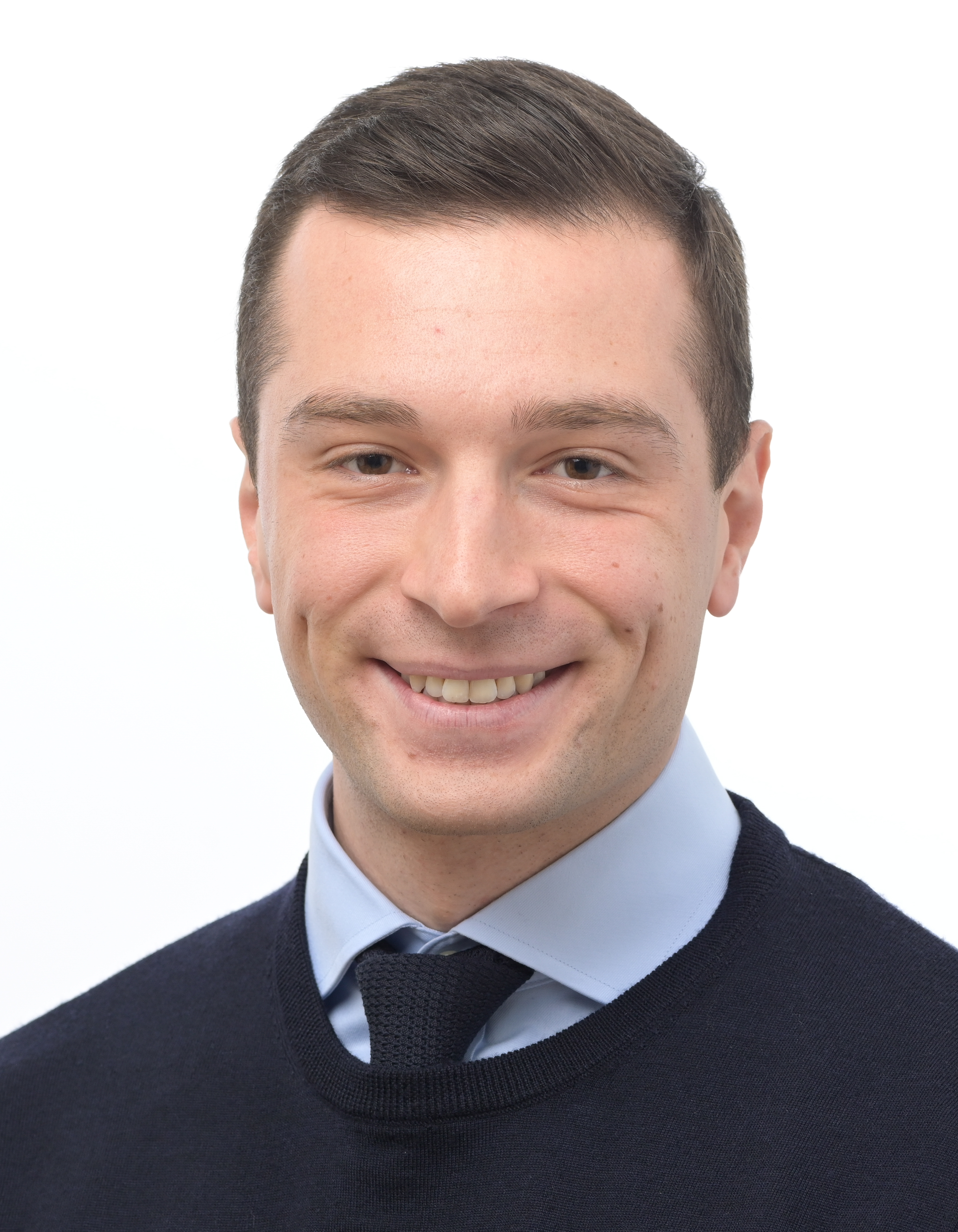
Bardella

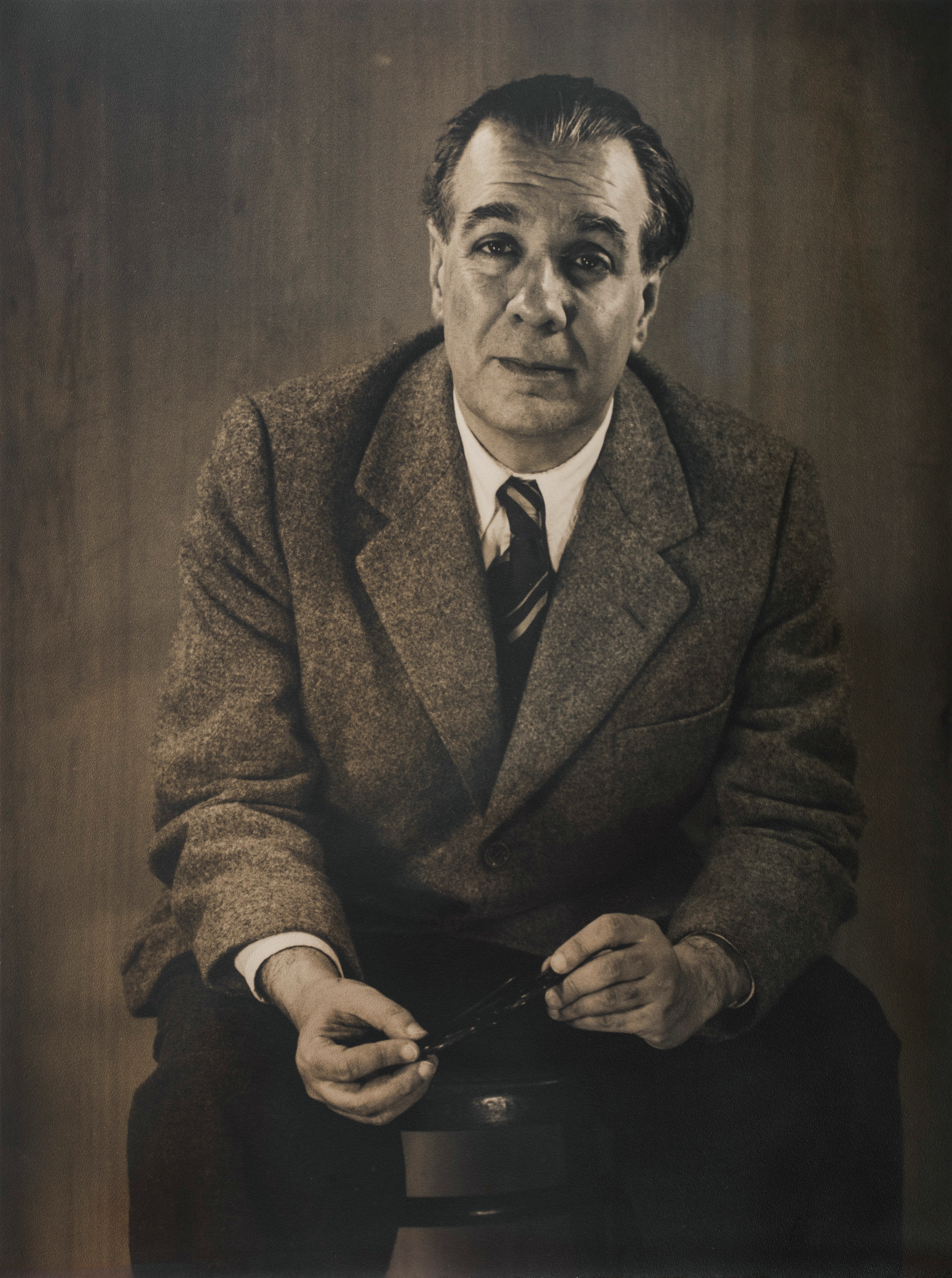
Borges

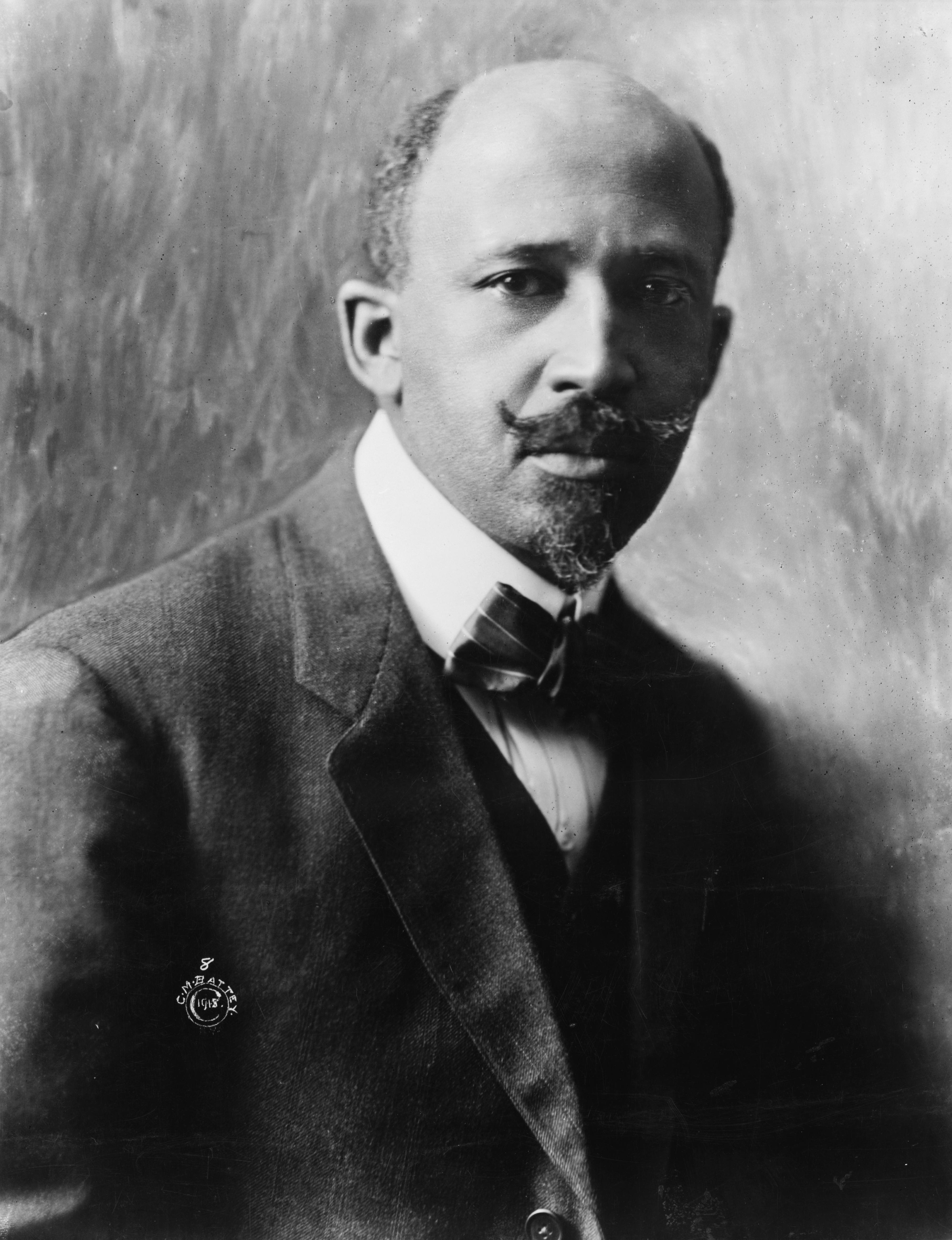
DuBois

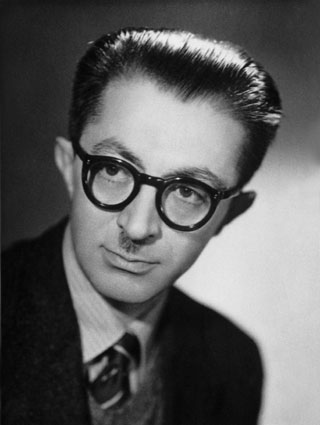
Hedayat

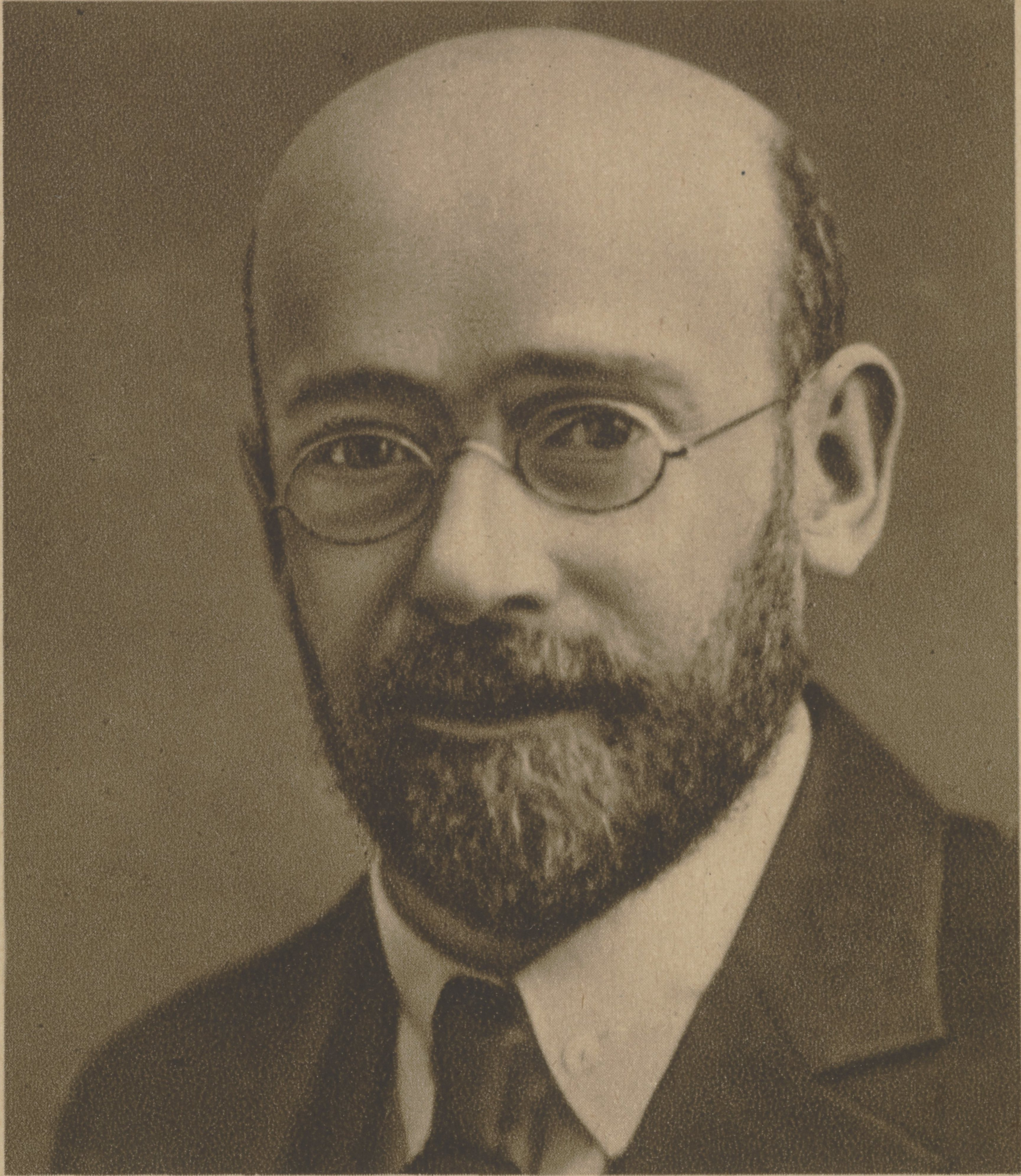
Korczak

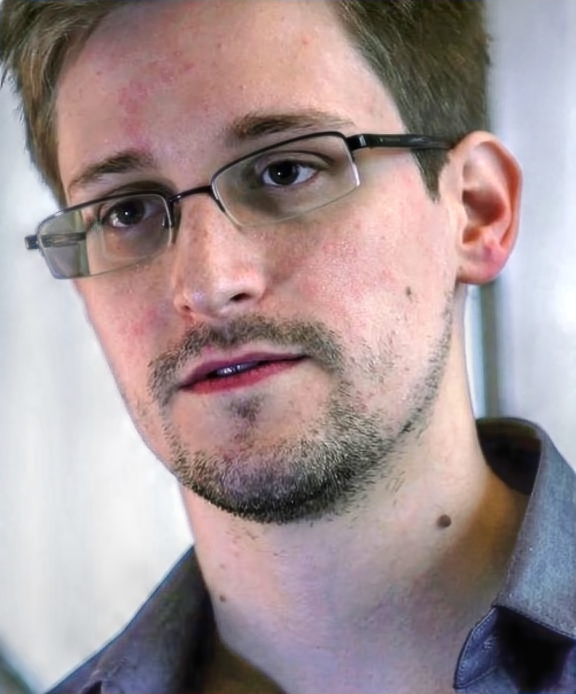
Snowden

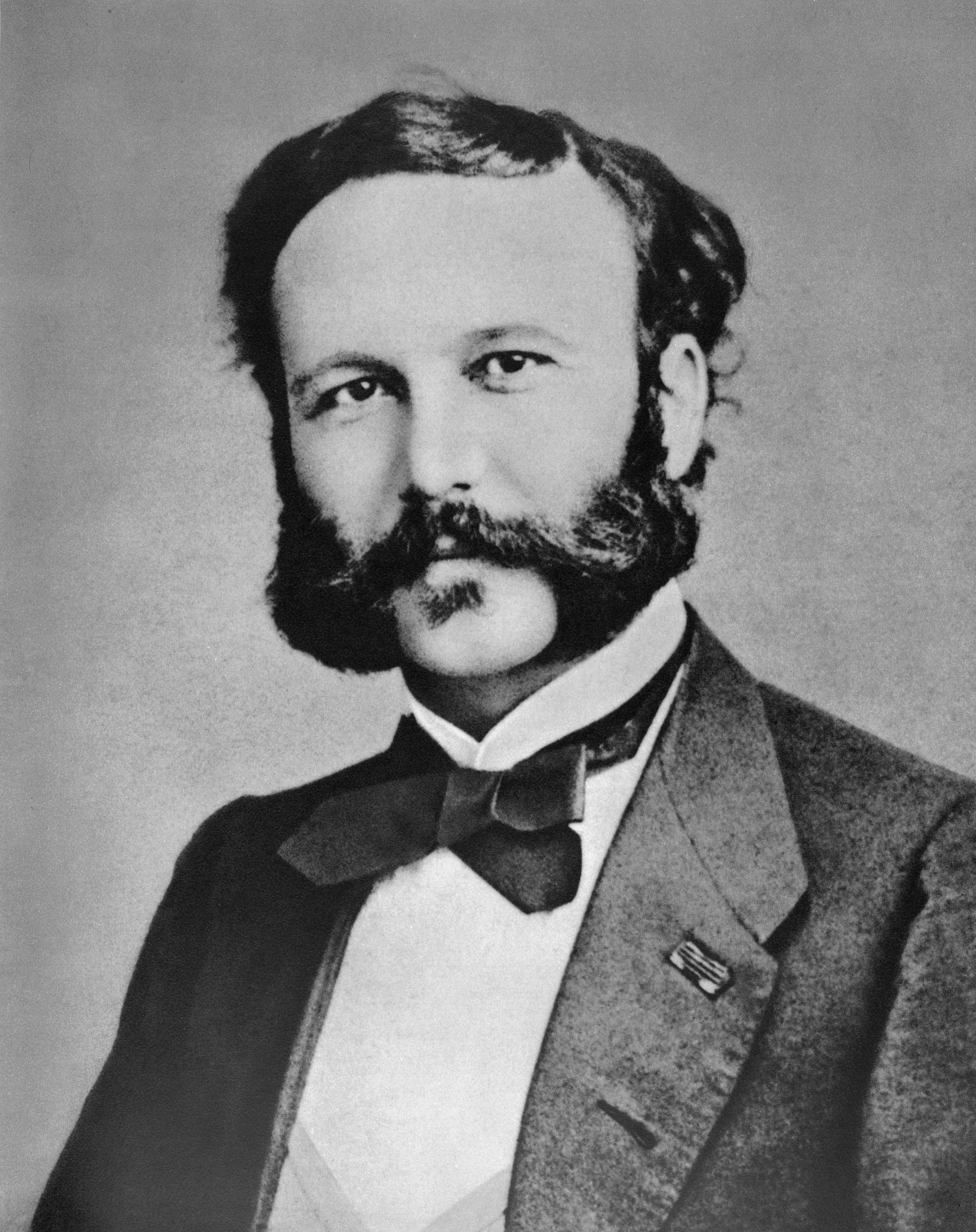
Dunant

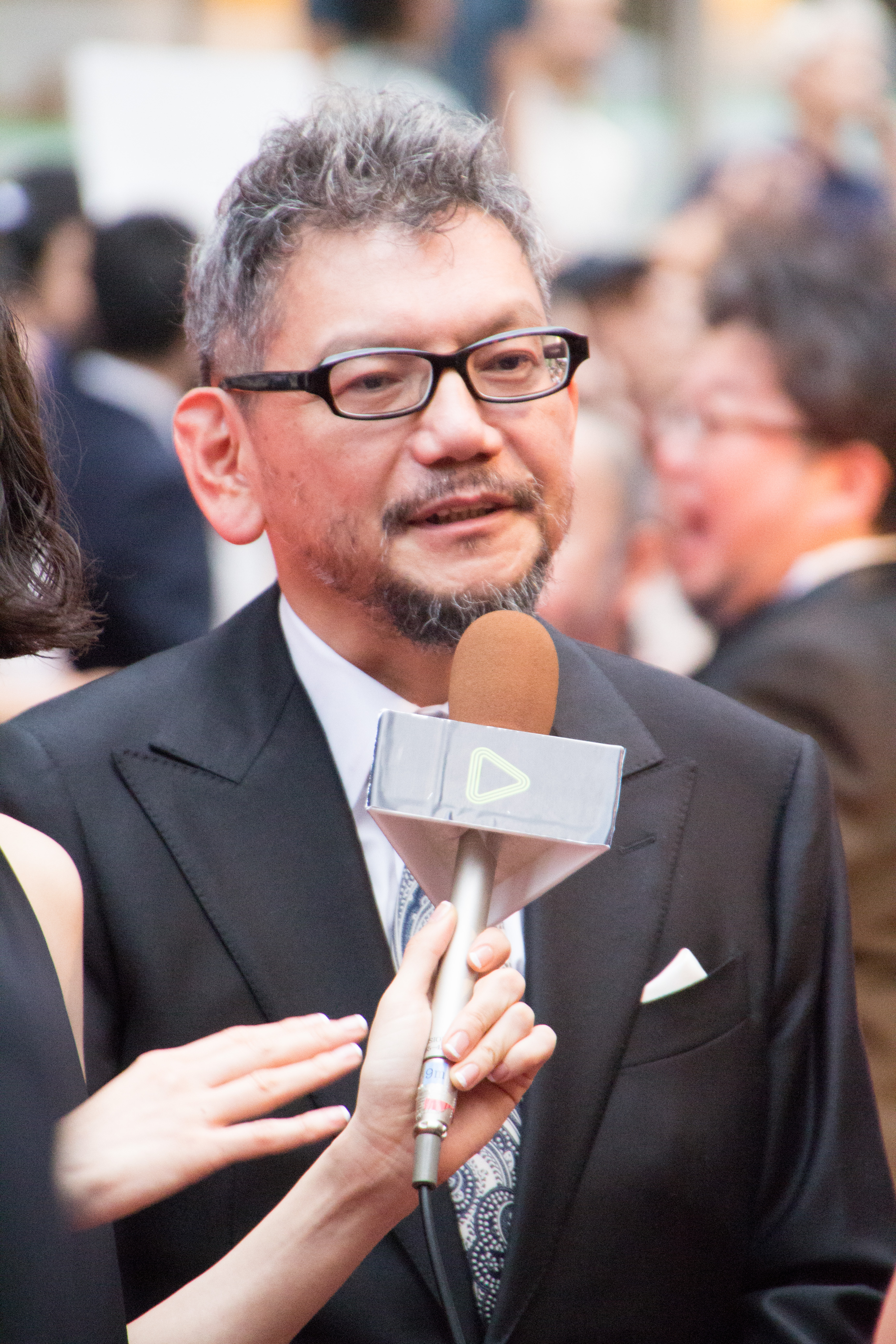
Anno

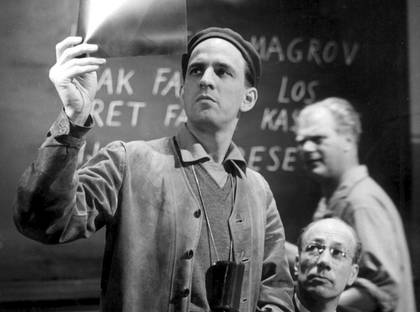
Bergman

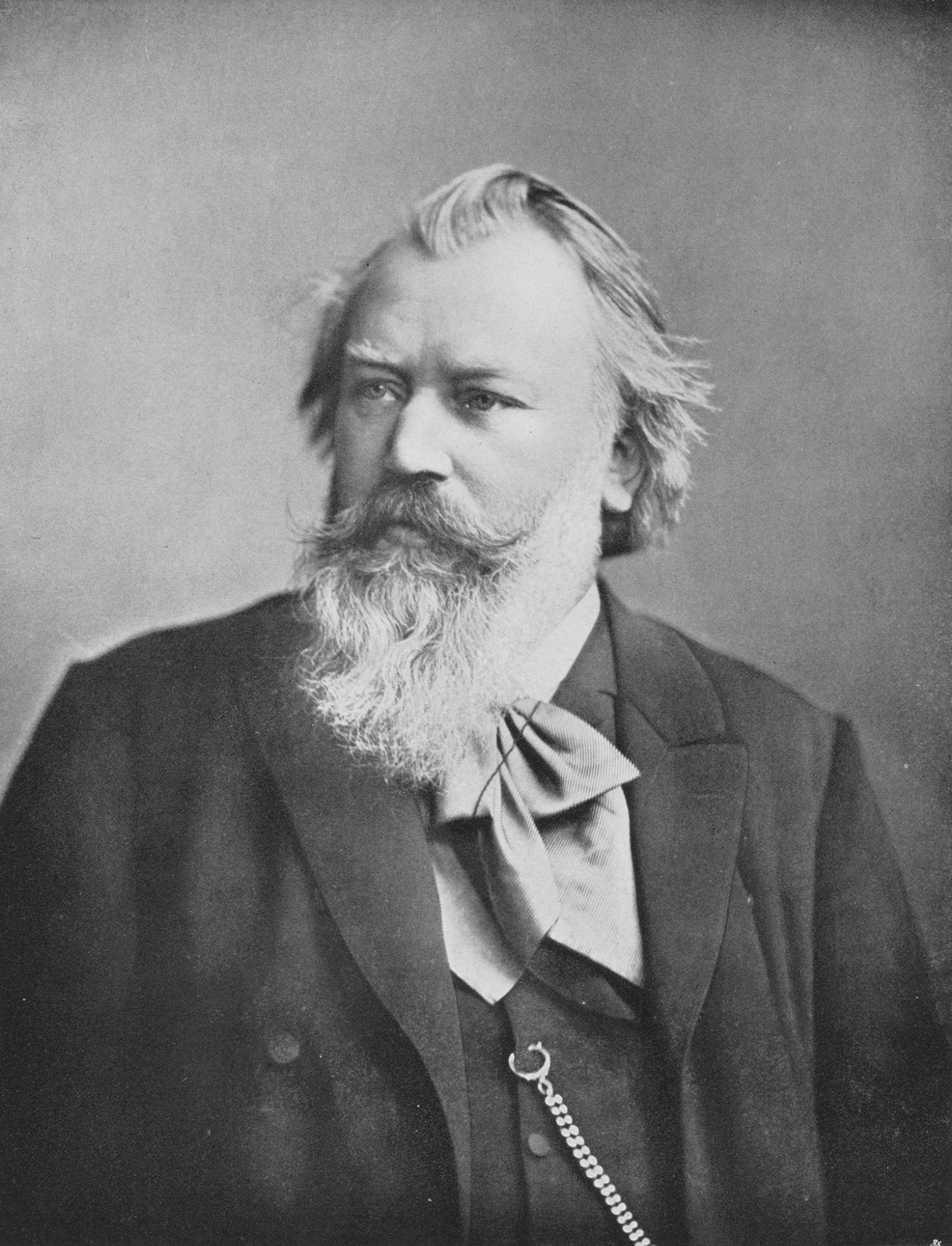
Brahms

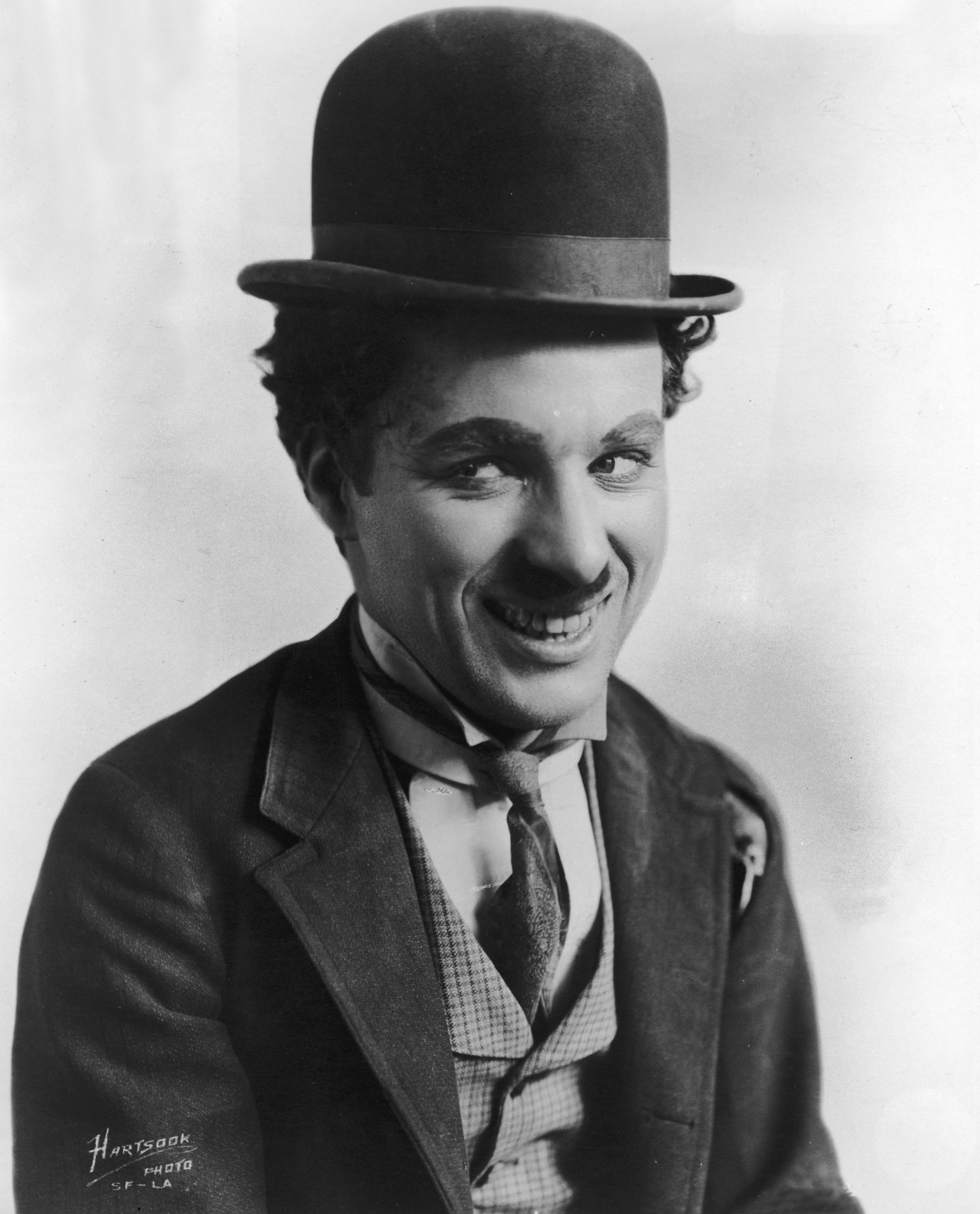
Chaplin

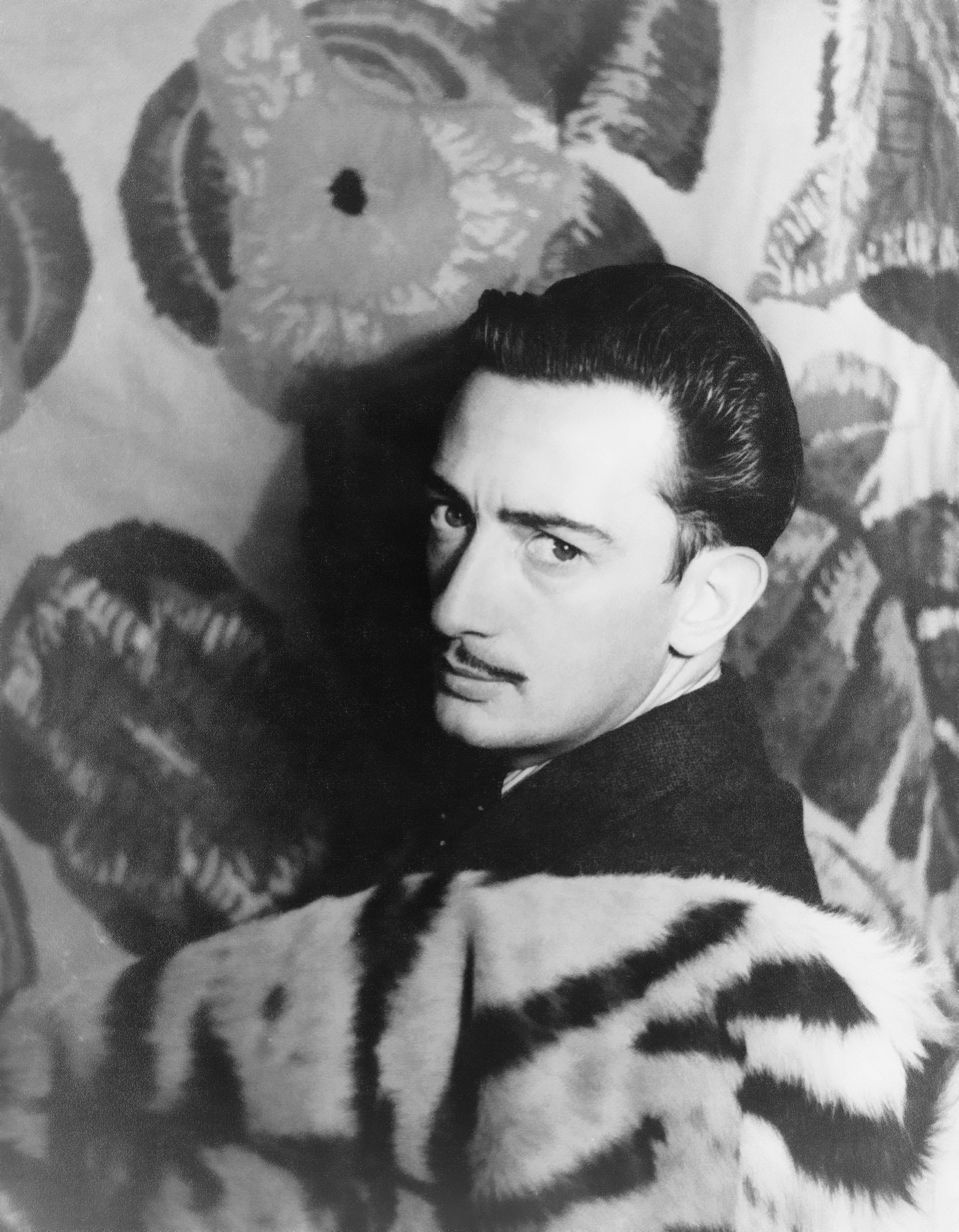
Dalí

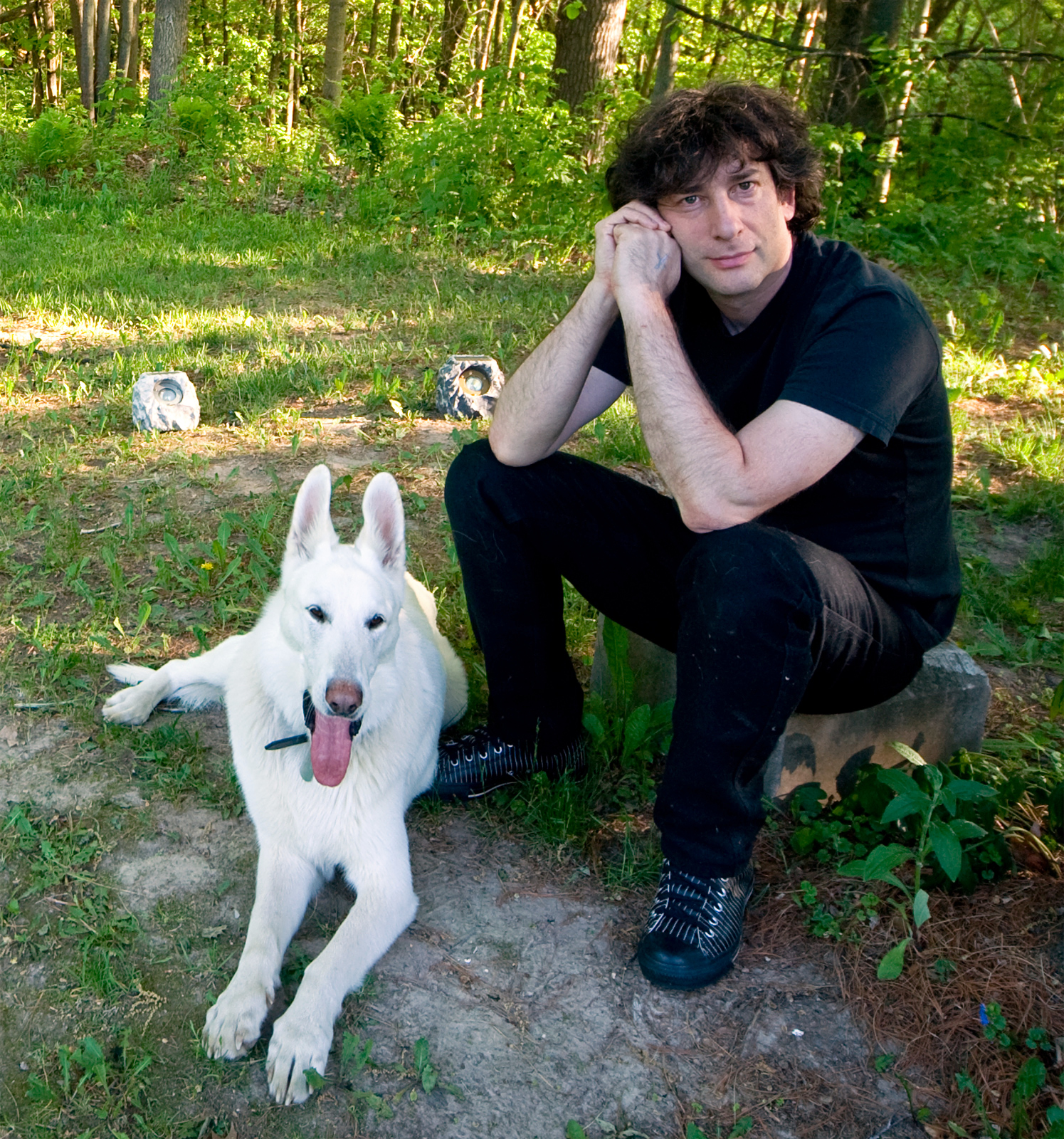
Gaiman

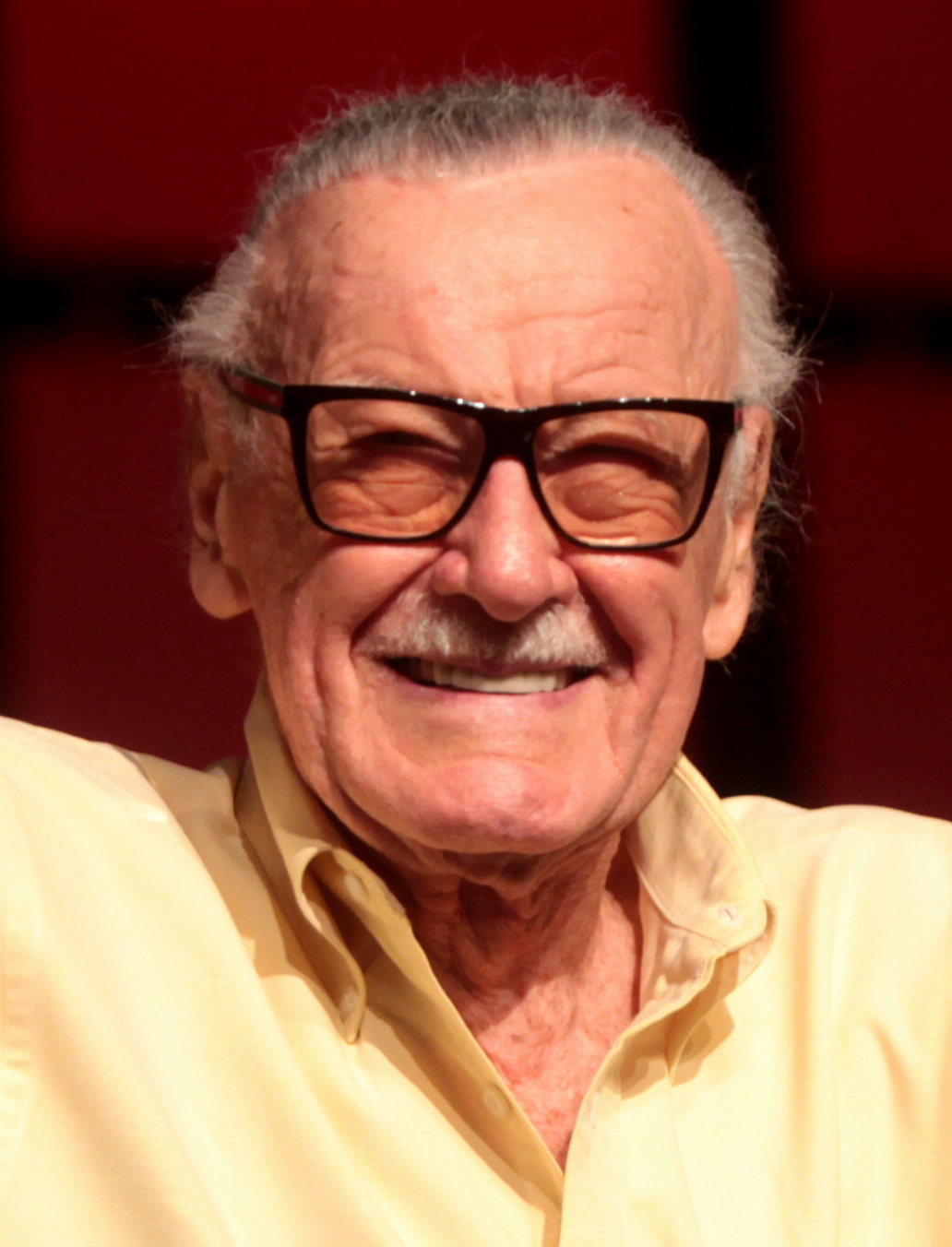
Lee

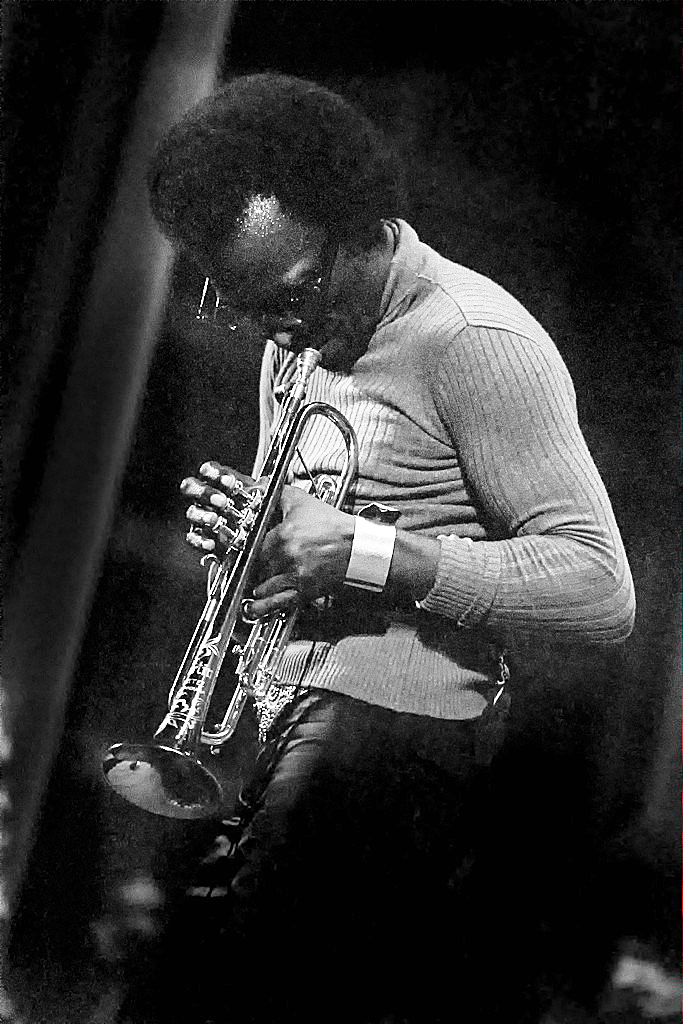
Davis

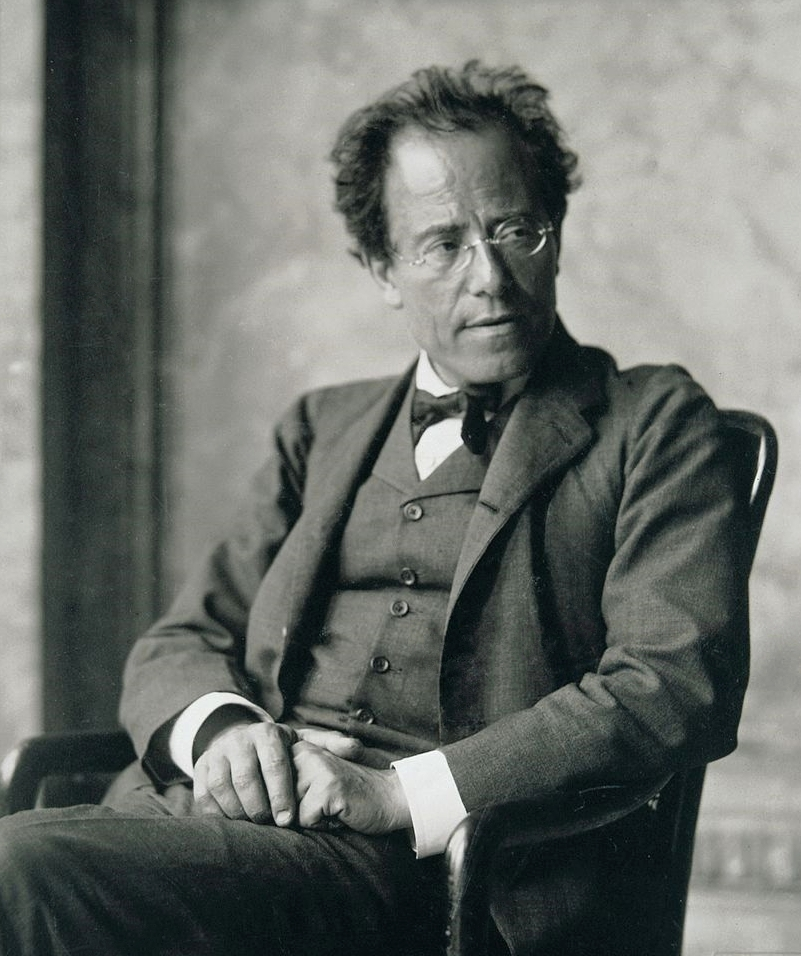
Mahler

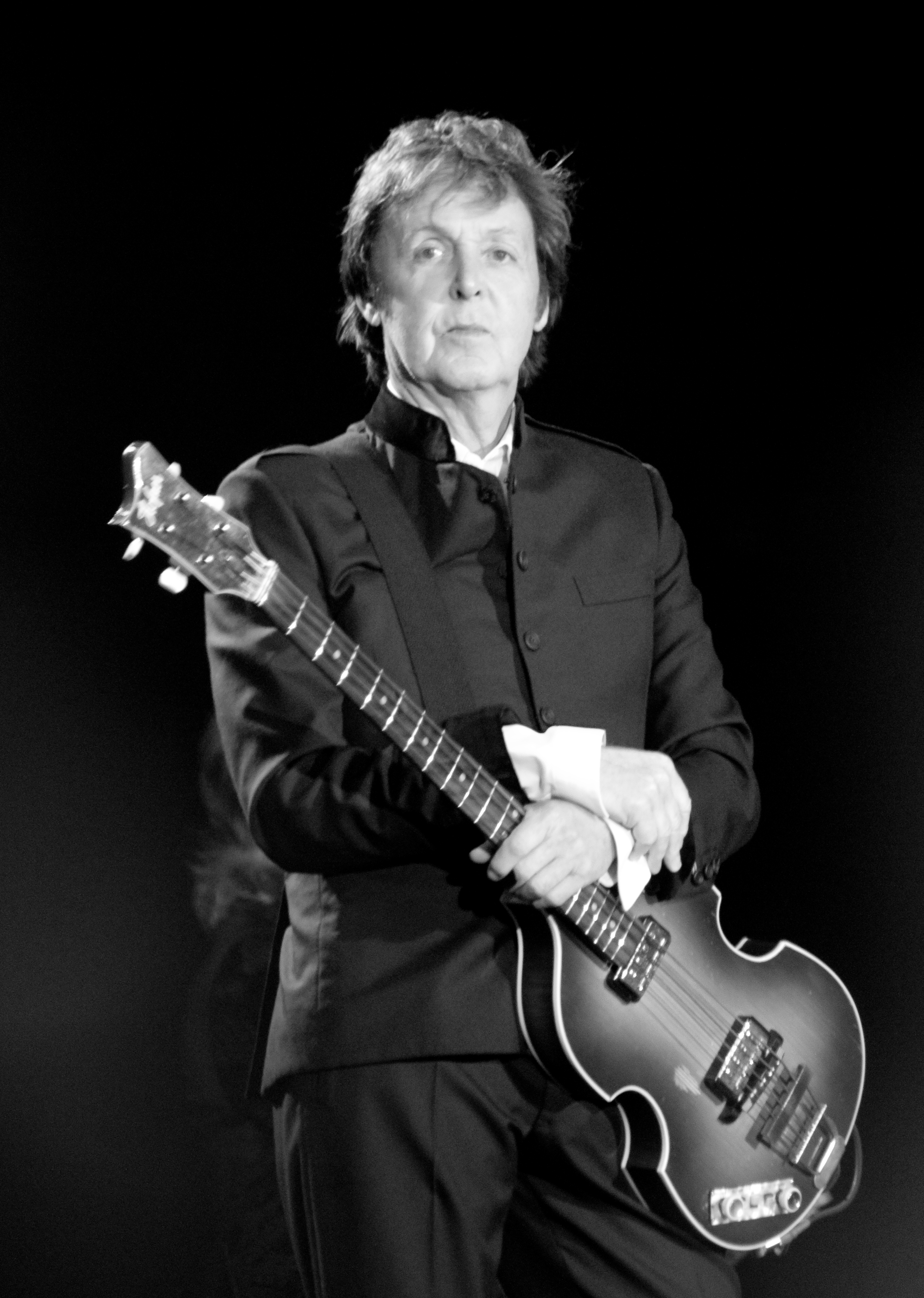
McCartney

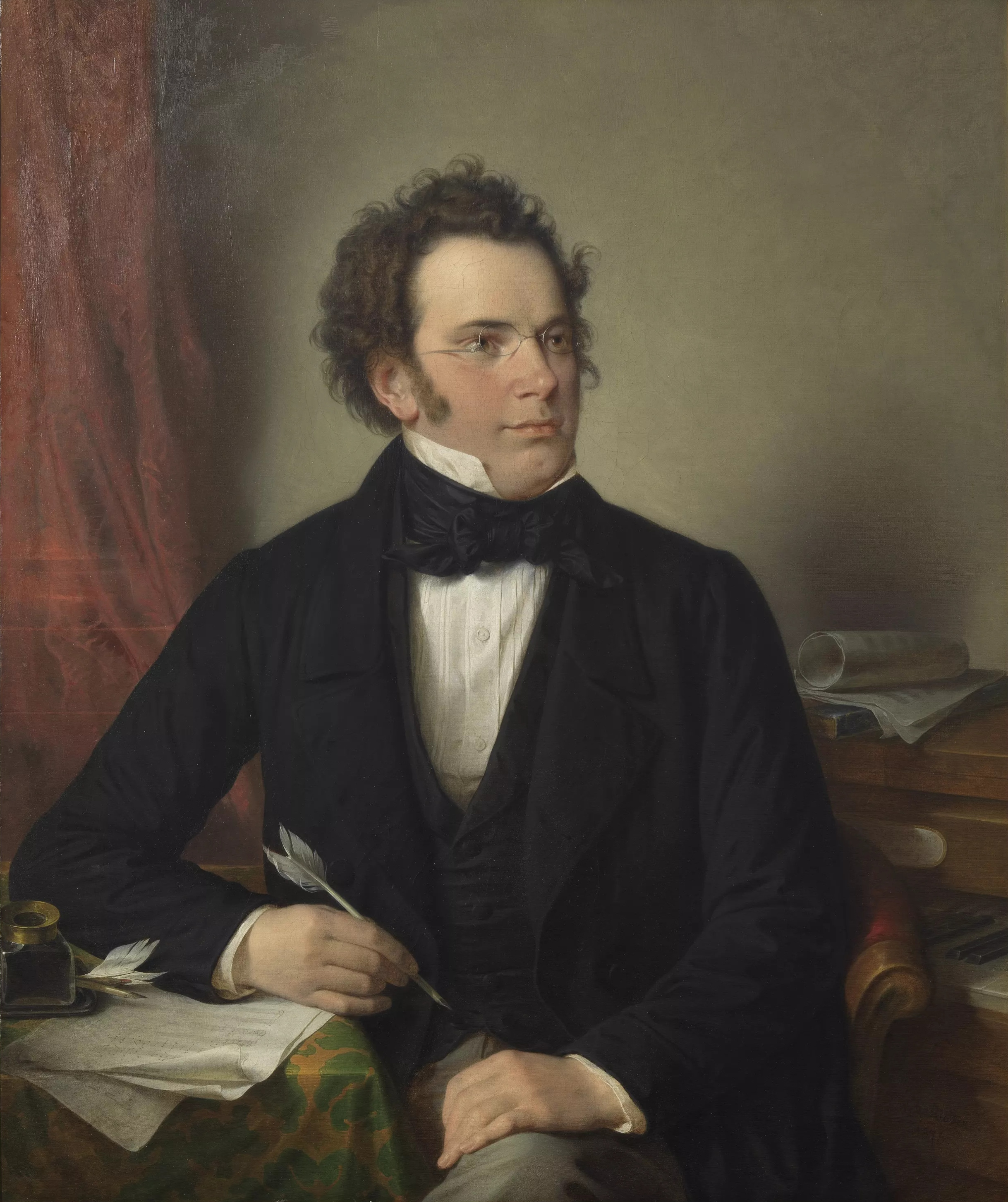
Schubert

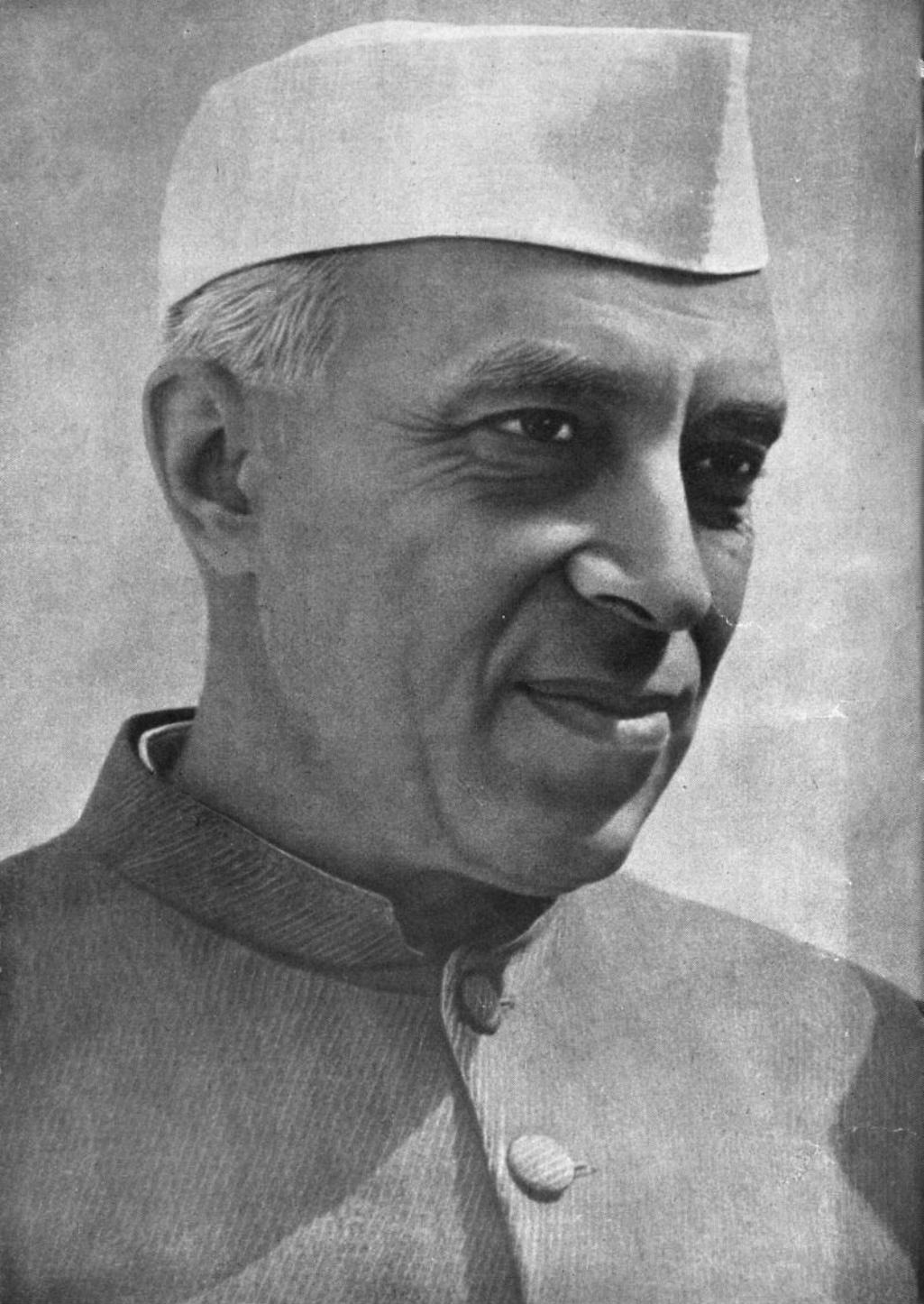
Nehru

Listed here are persons who have identified themselves as theologically agnostic. Also included are individuals who have expressed the view that the veracity of a god's existence is unknown or inherently unknowable.

== List ==
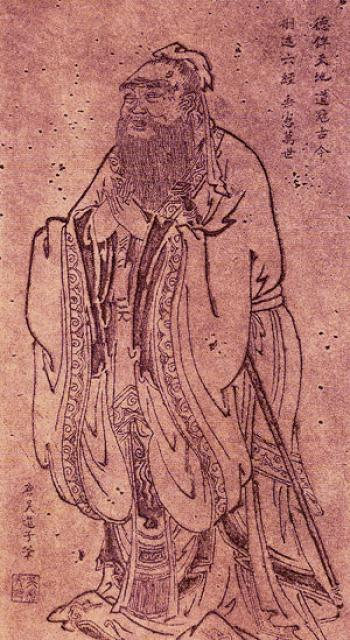
Confucius

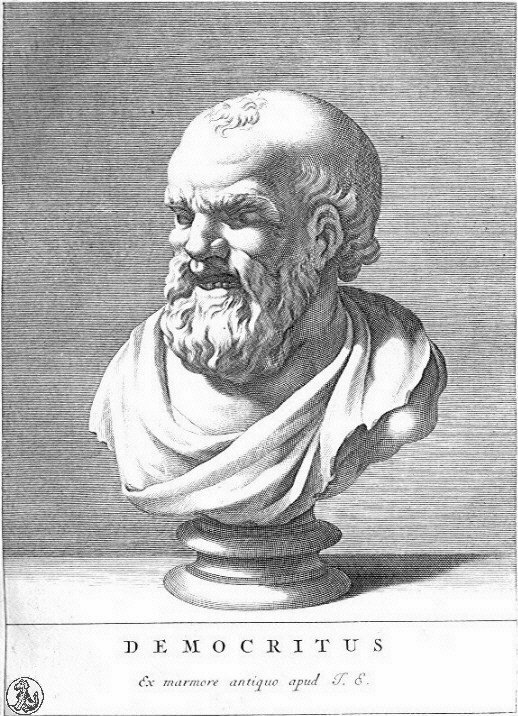
Democritus

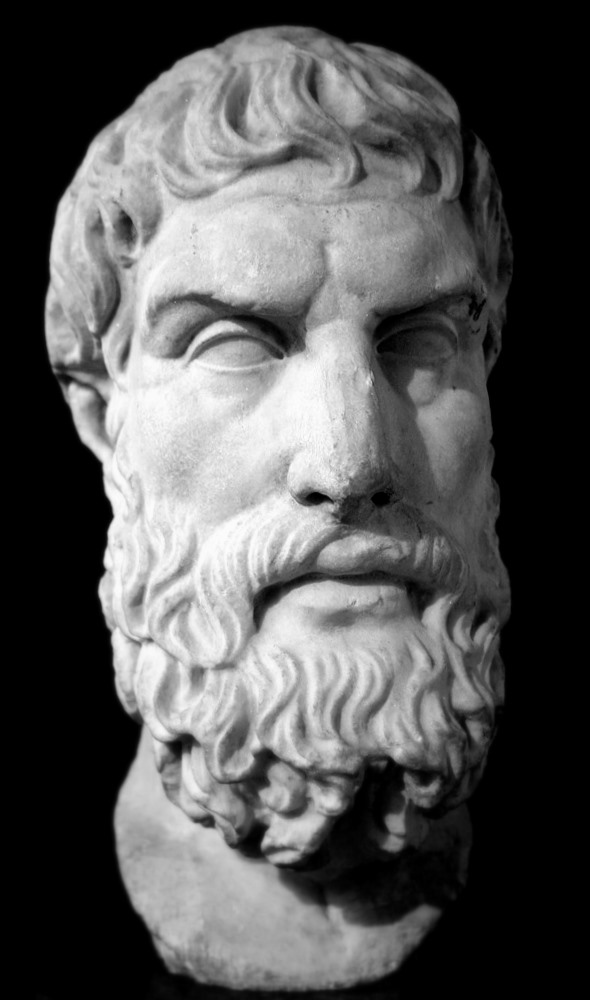
Epicurus

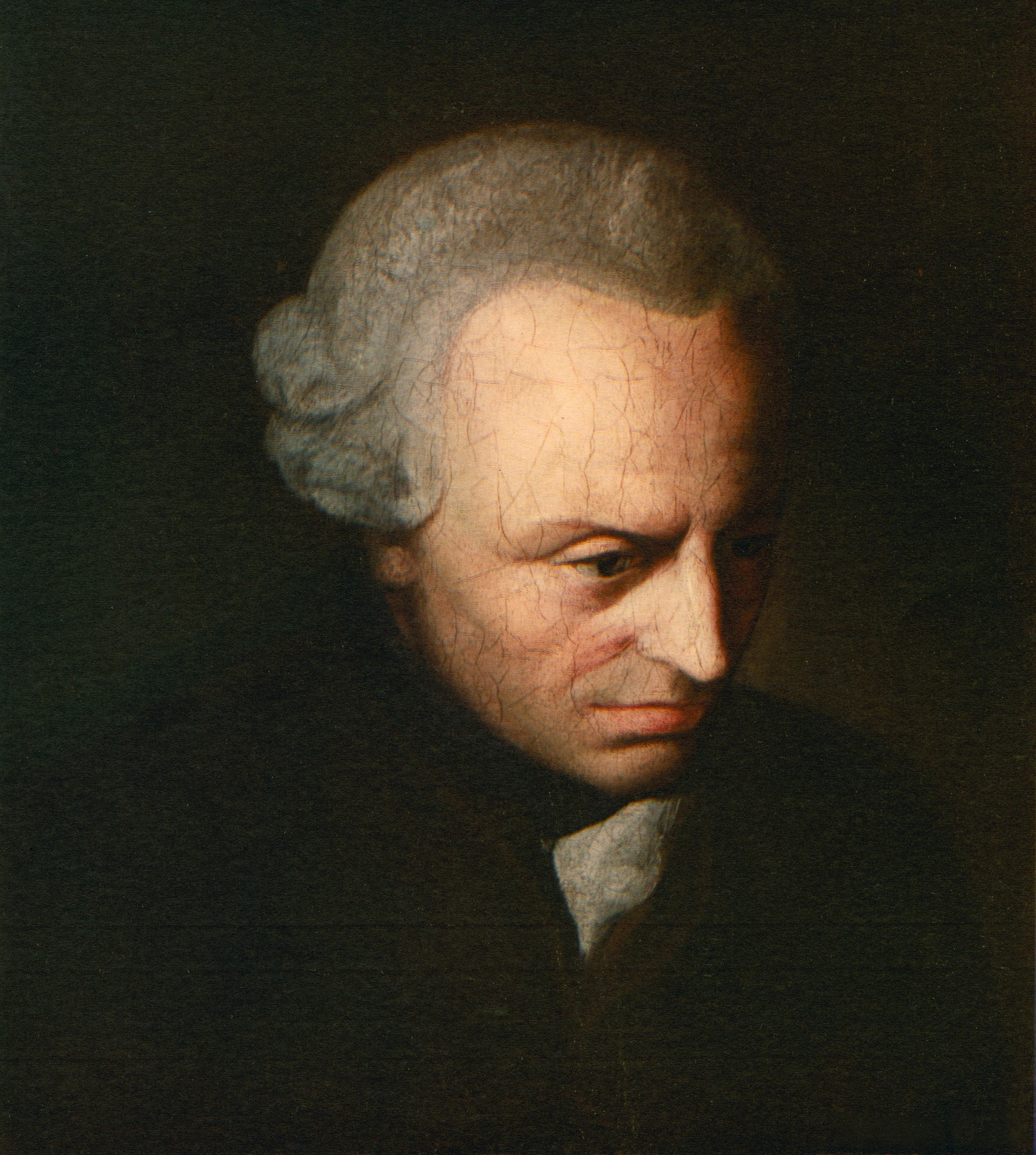
Kant

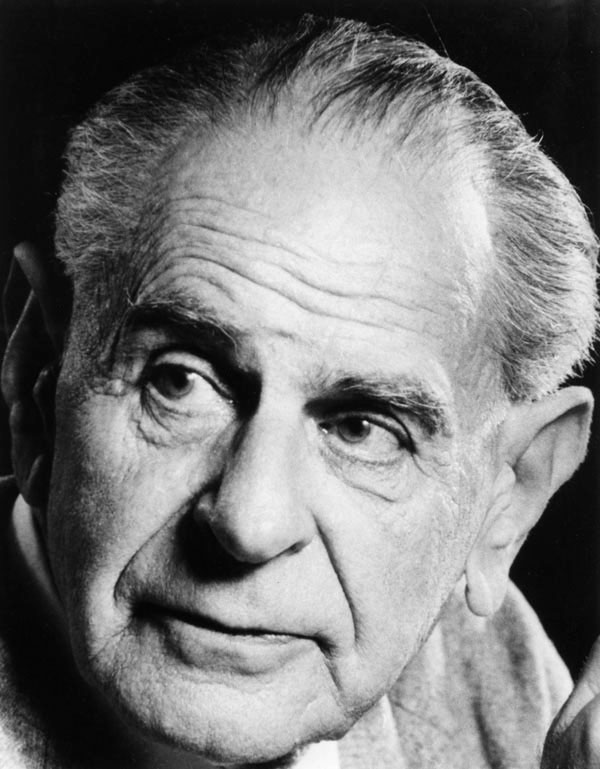
Popper

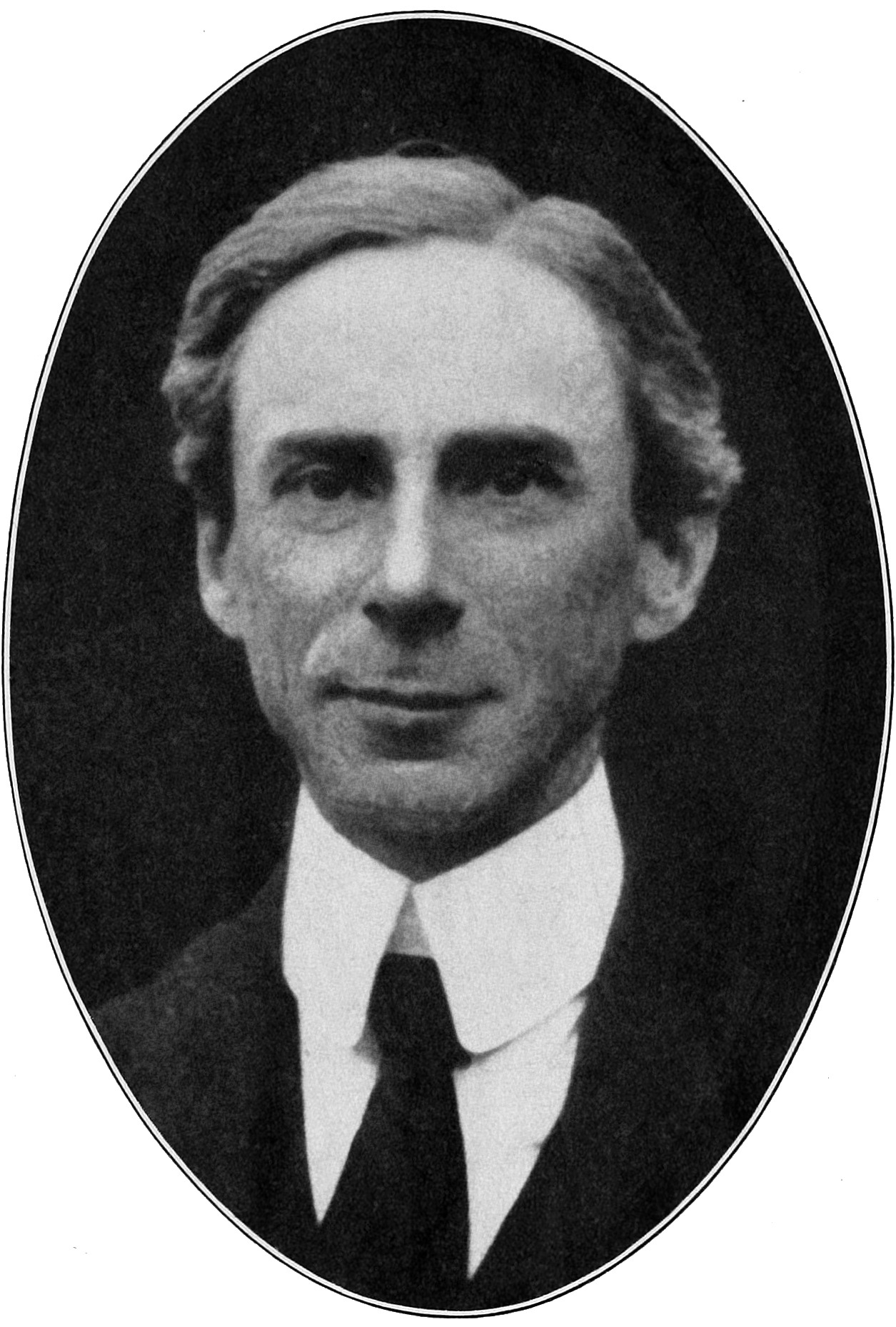
Russell

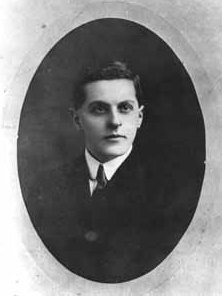
Wittgenstein

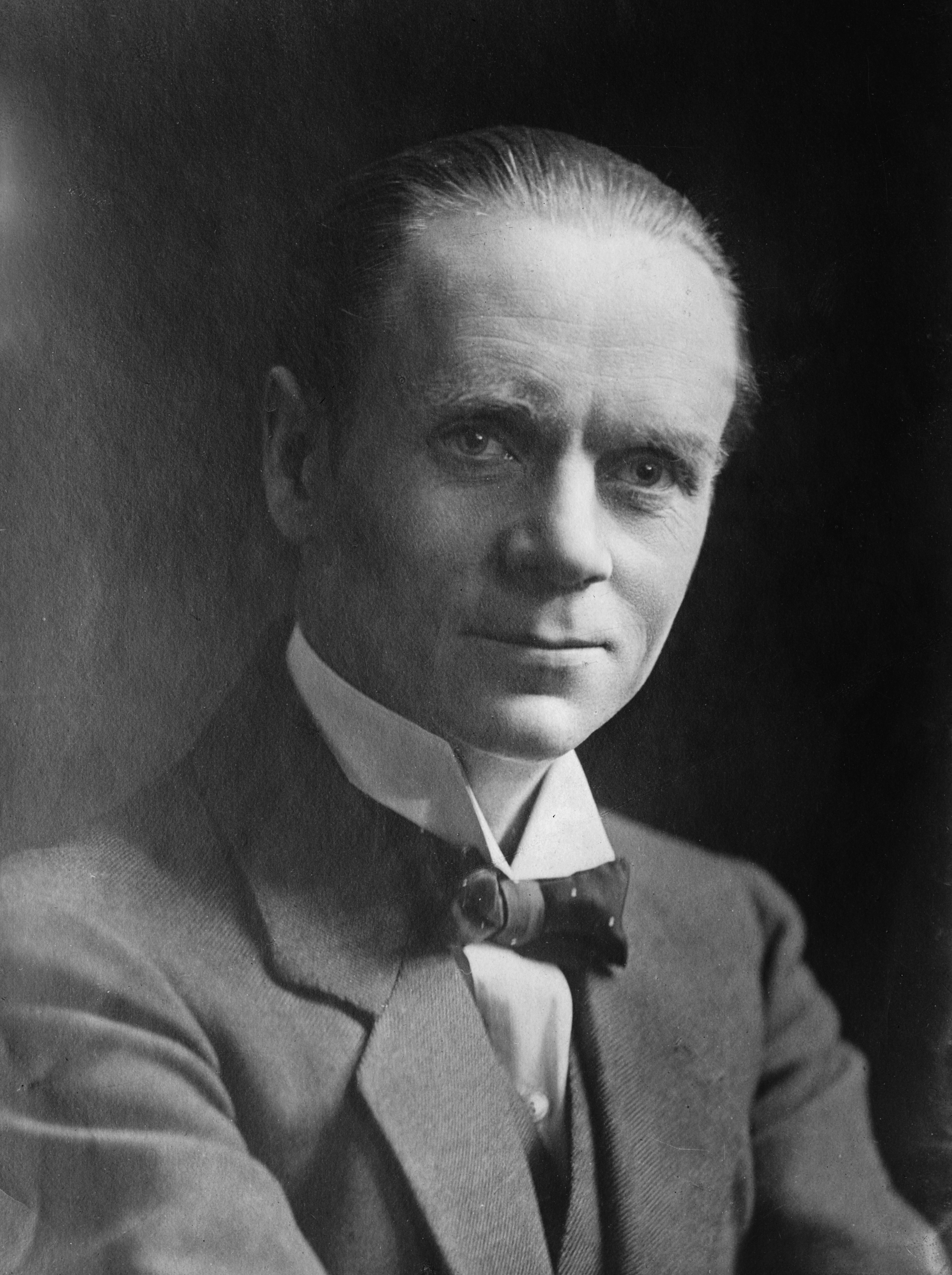
Angell

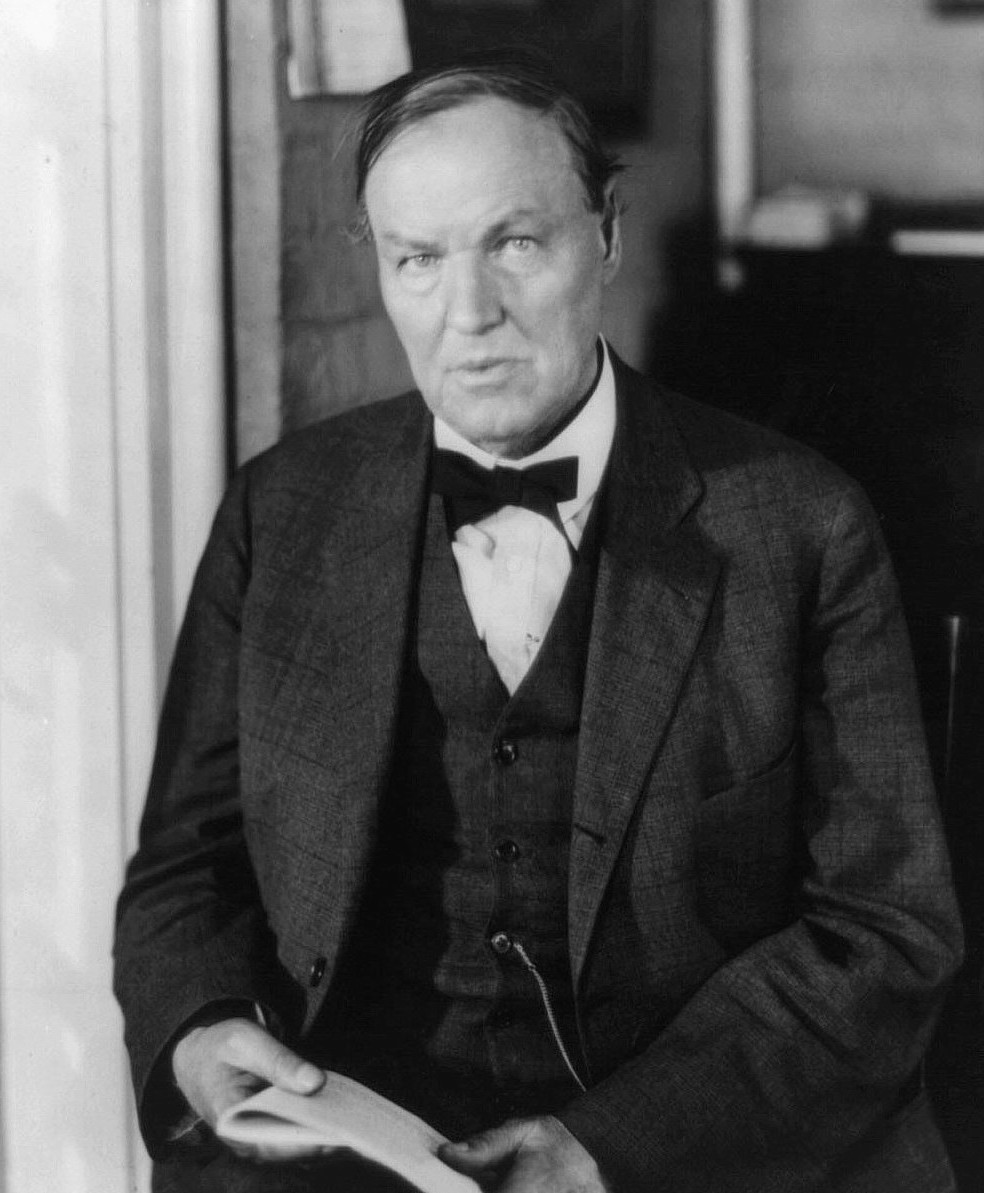
Darrow

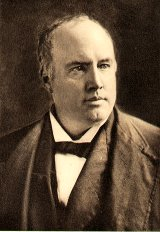
Ingersoll

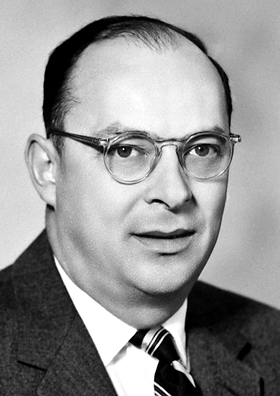
Bardeen

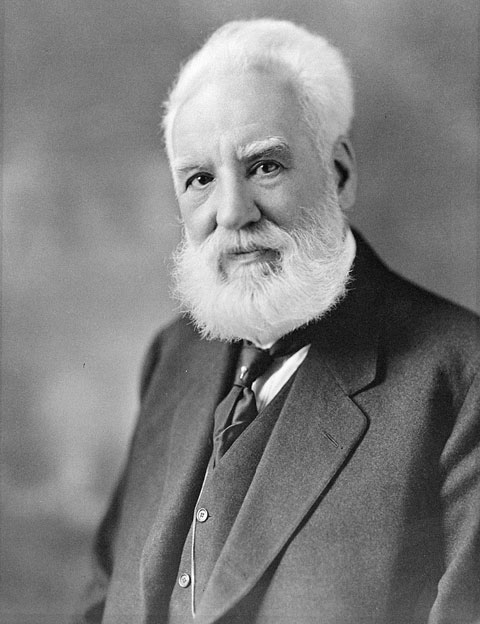
Bell

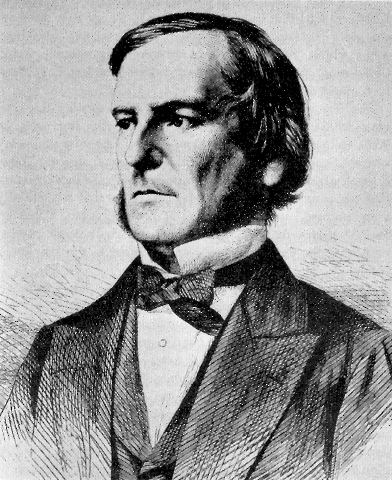
Boole

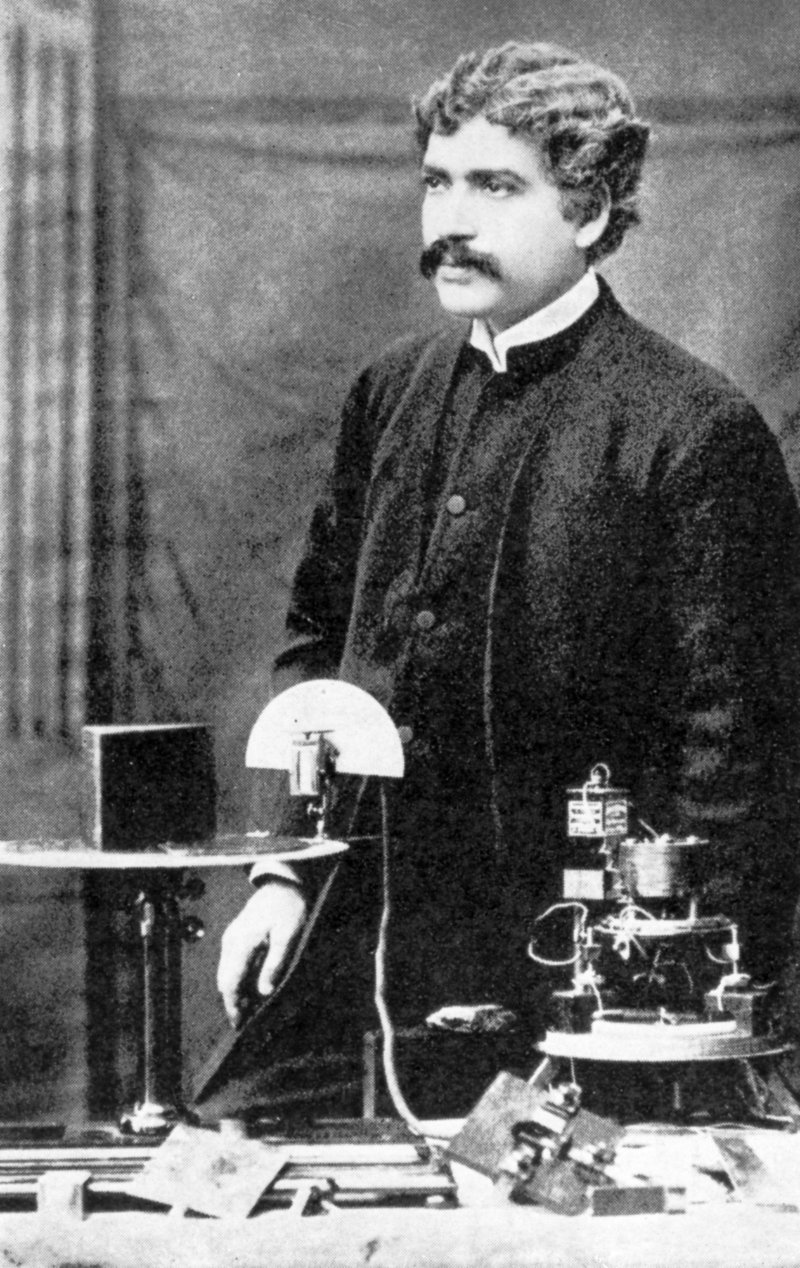
Bose

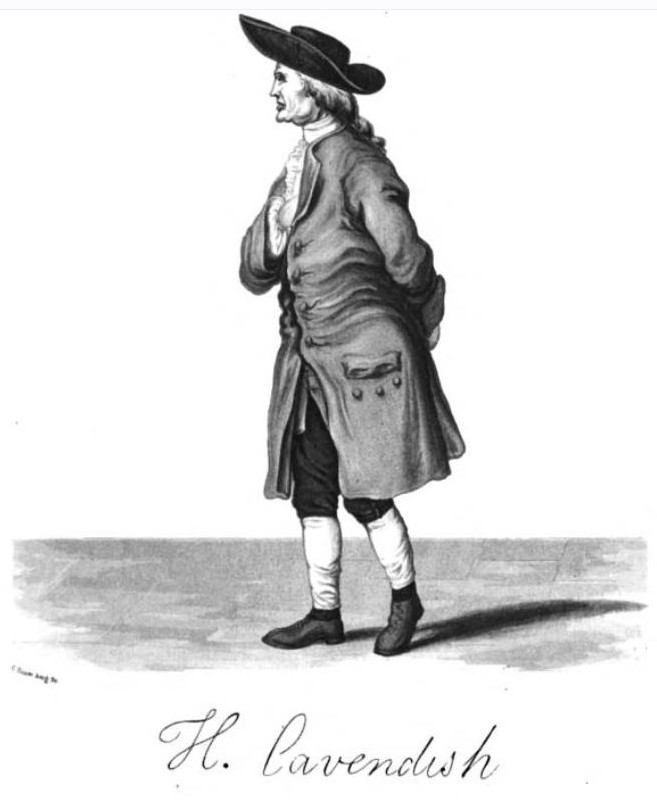
Cavendish

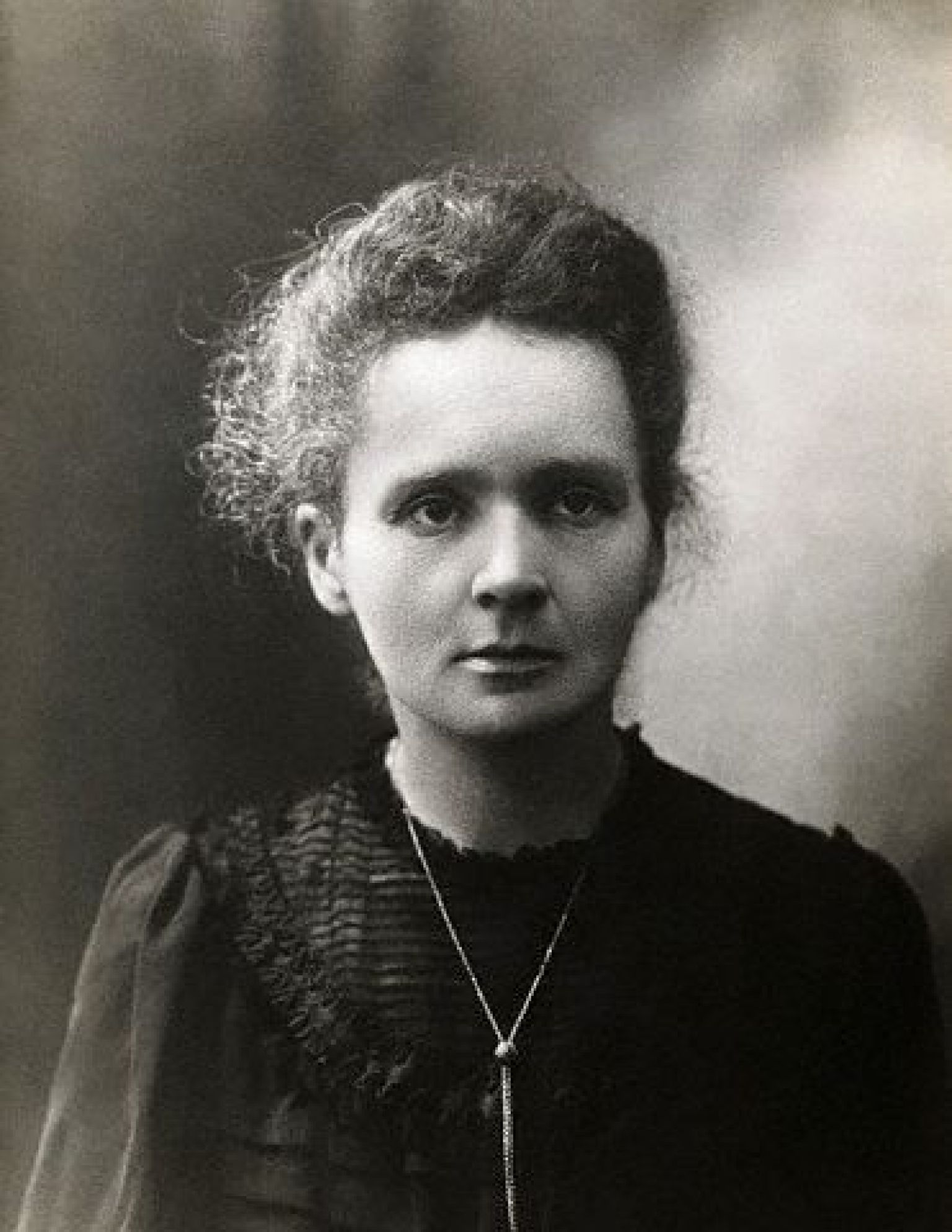
Curie

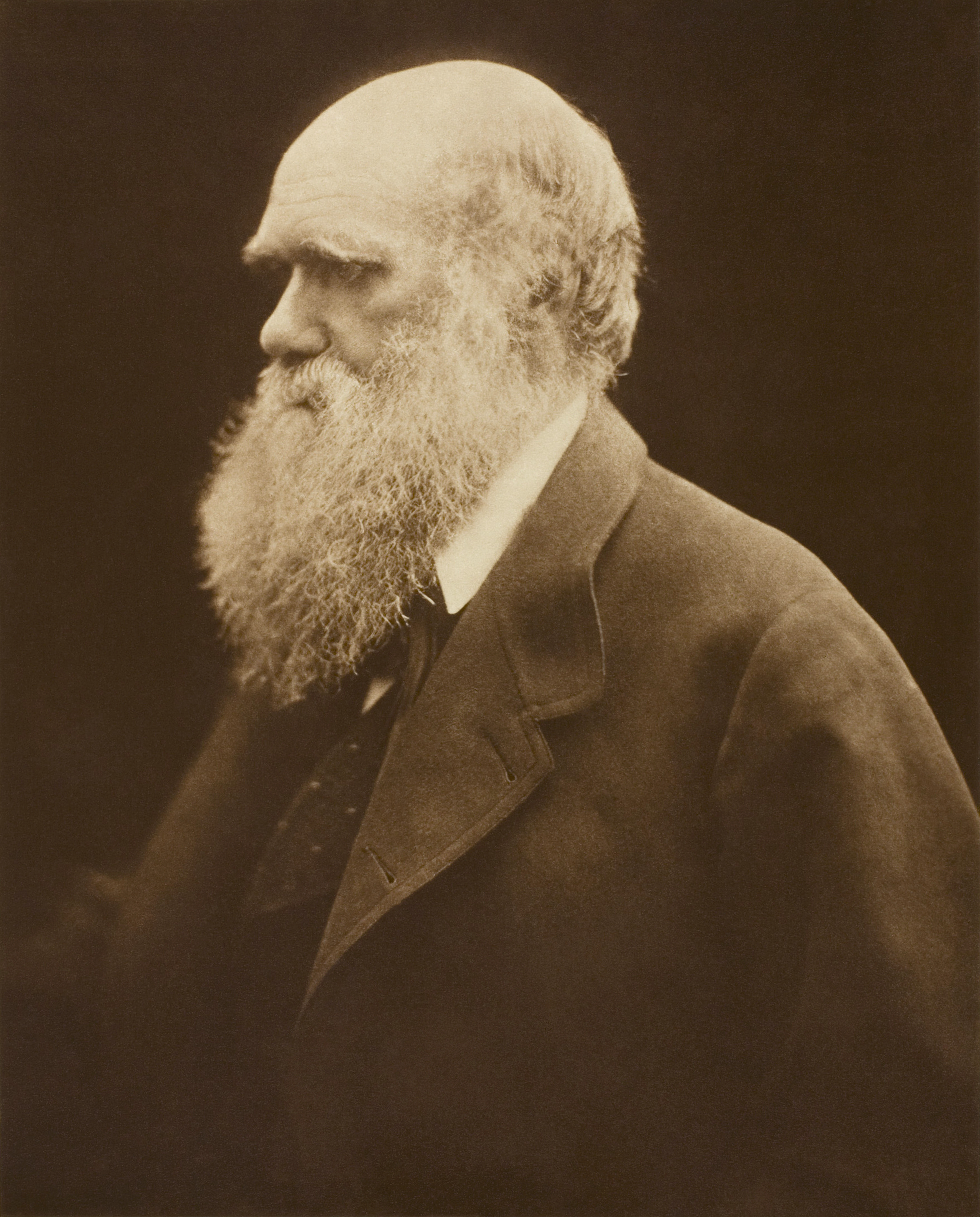
Darwin

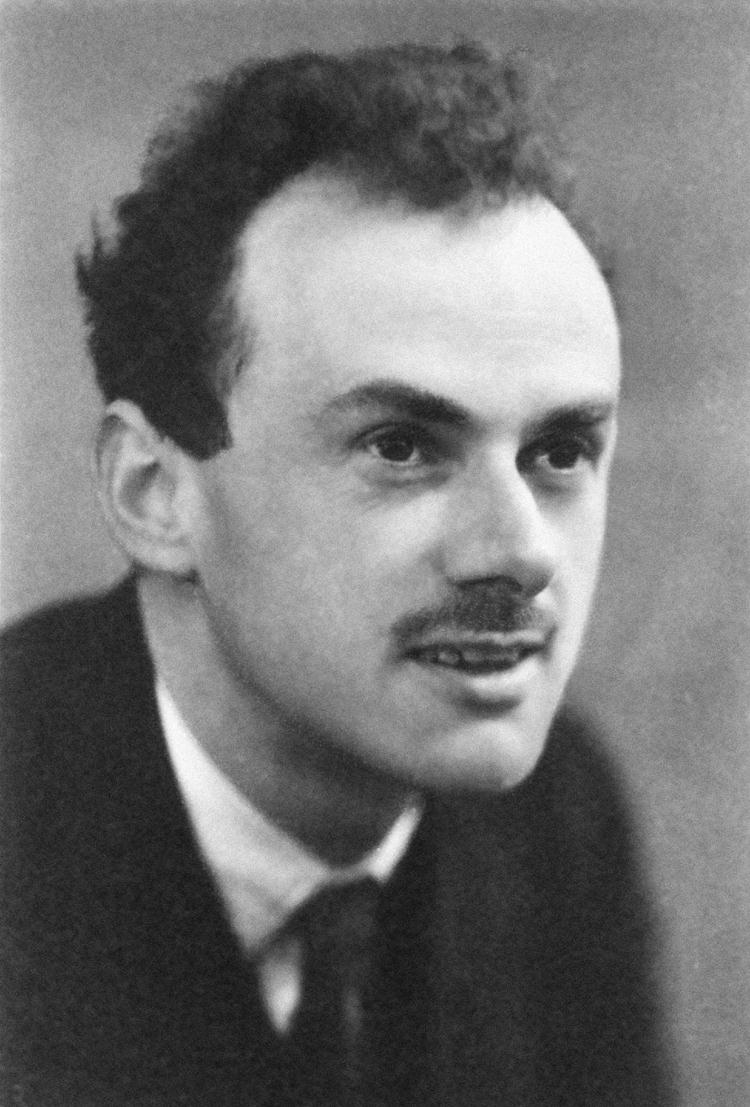
Dirac

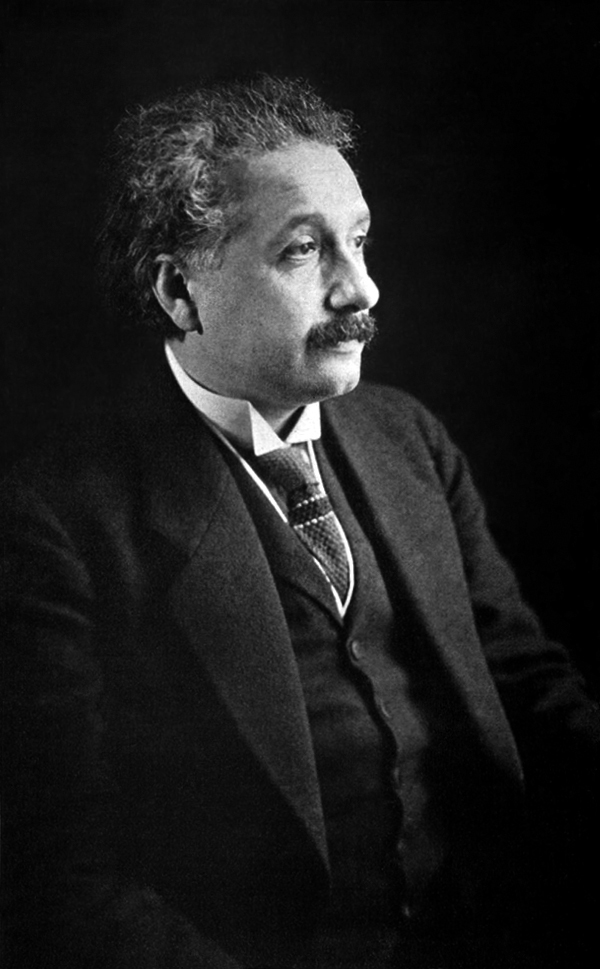
Einstein

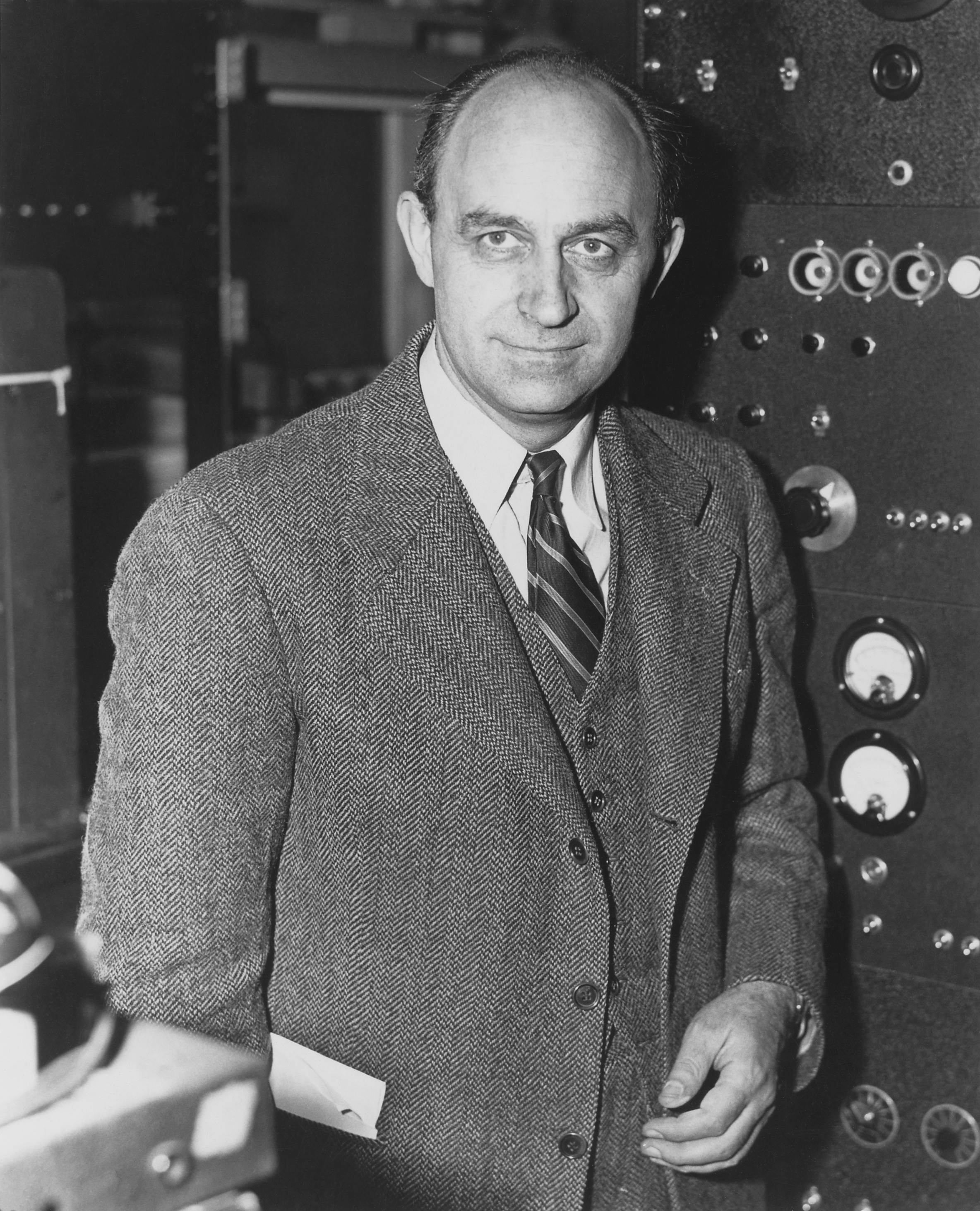
Fermi

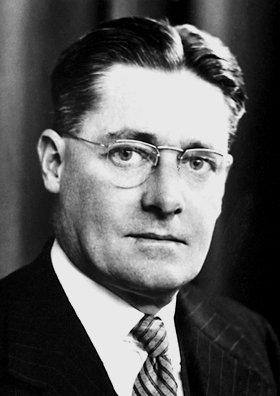
Florey

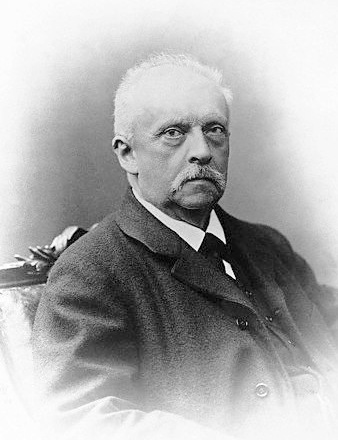
Helmholtz

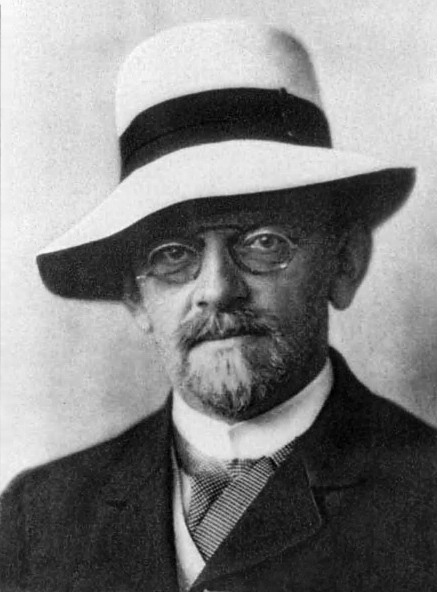
Hilbert

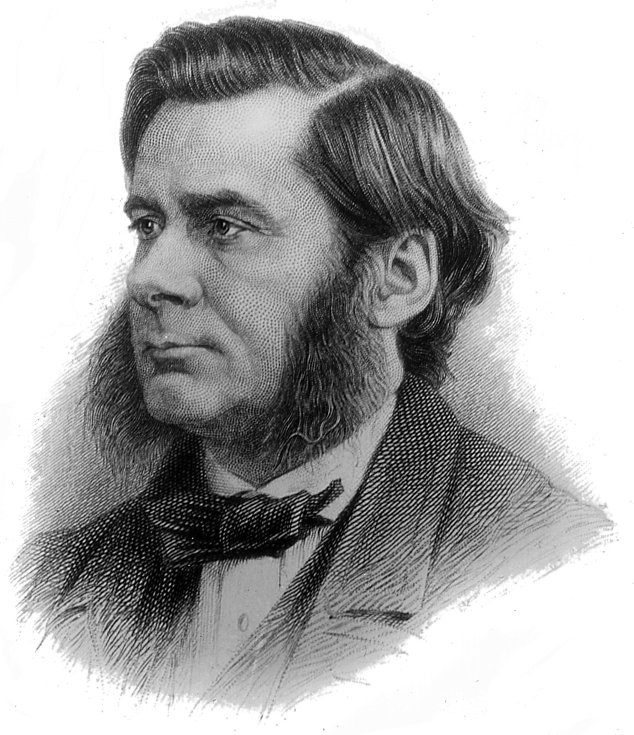
Thomas Huxley, coiner of the term agnostic.

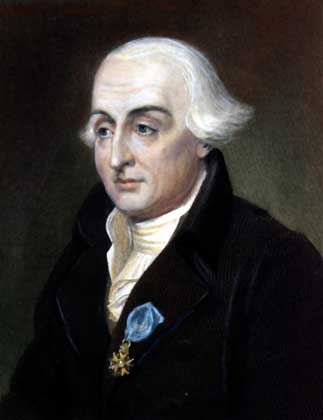
Lagrange

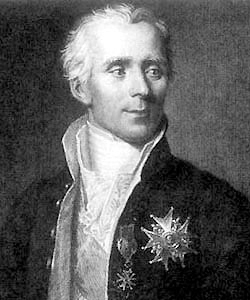
Laplace

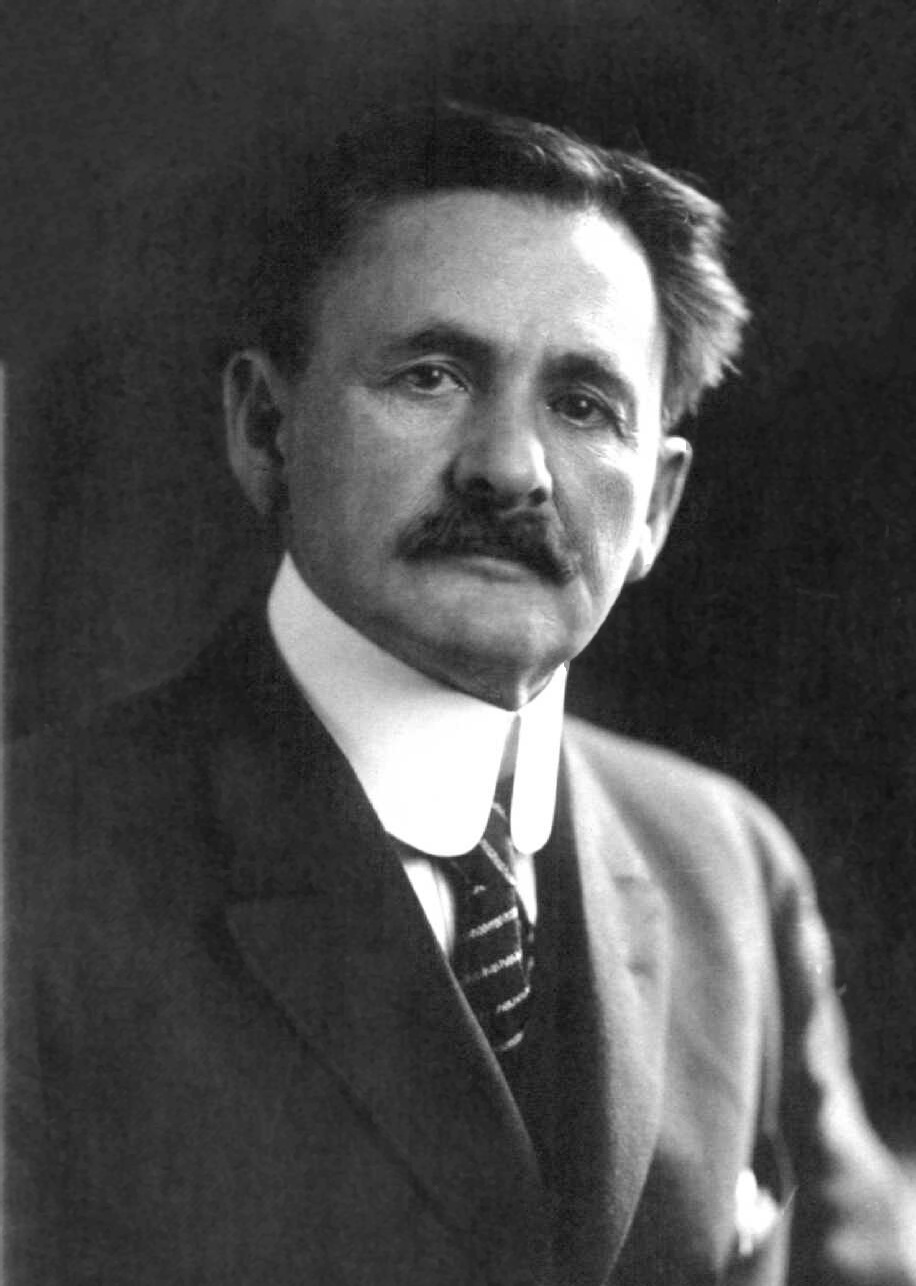
Michelson

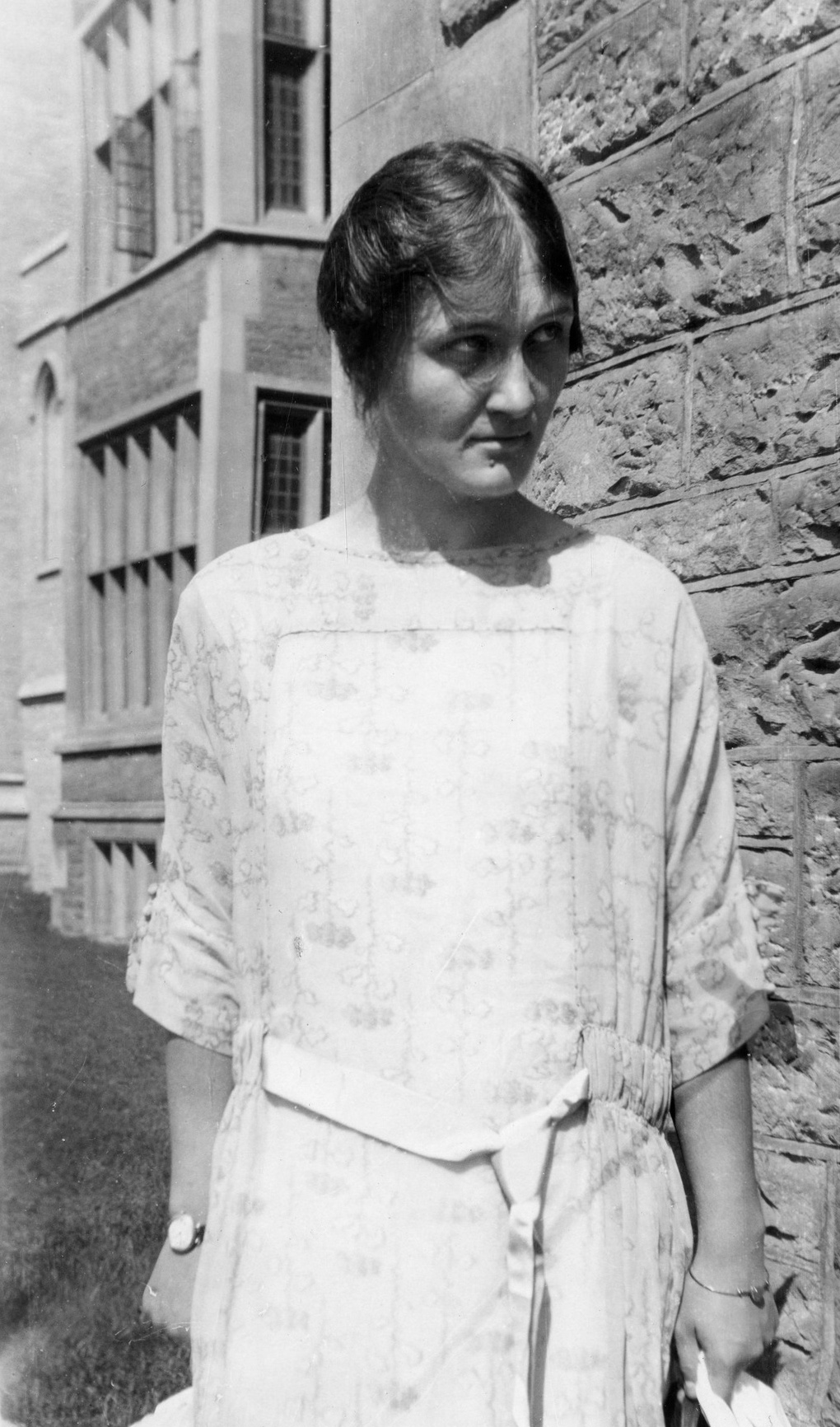
Payne-Gaposchkin

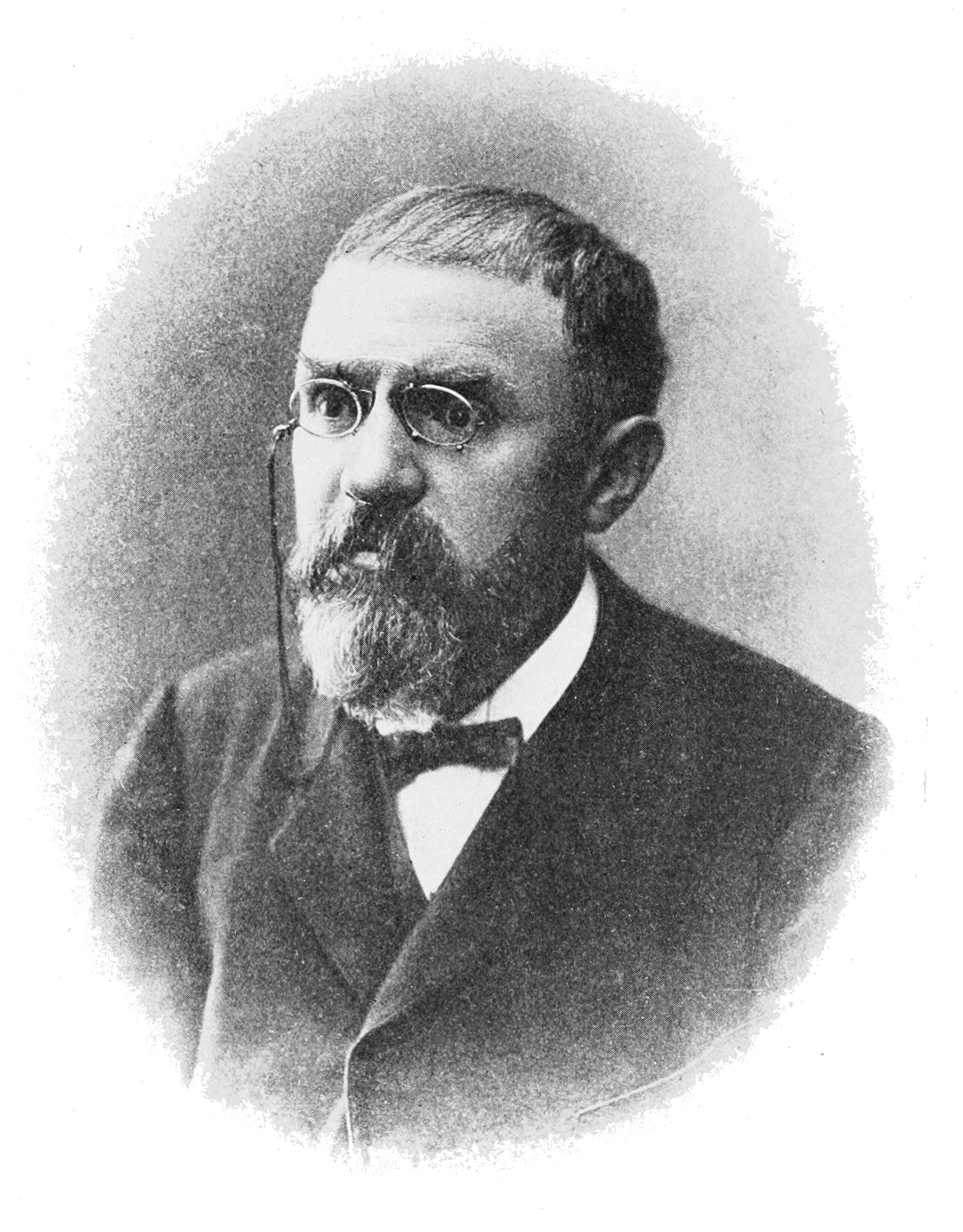
Poincaré

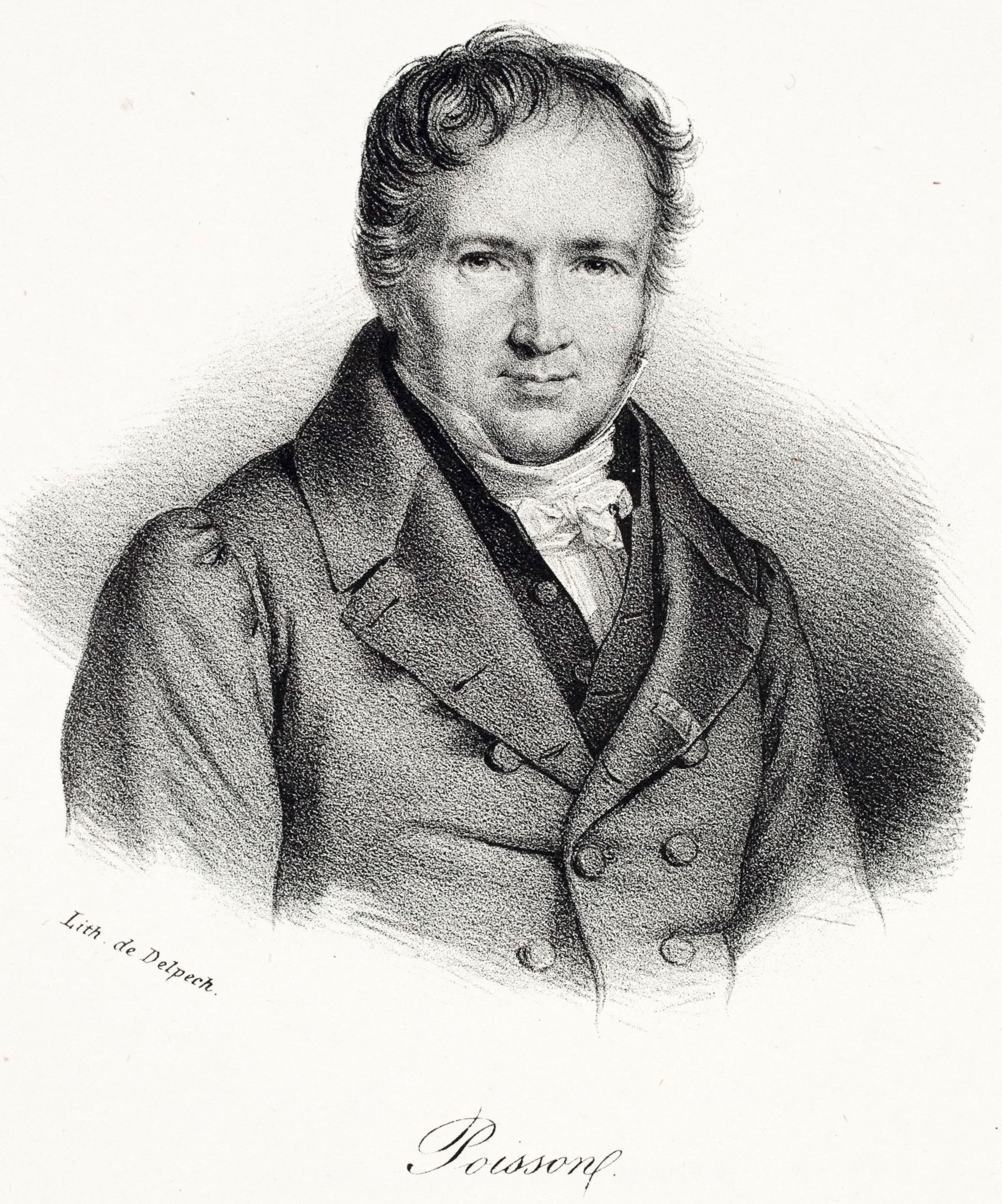
Poisson

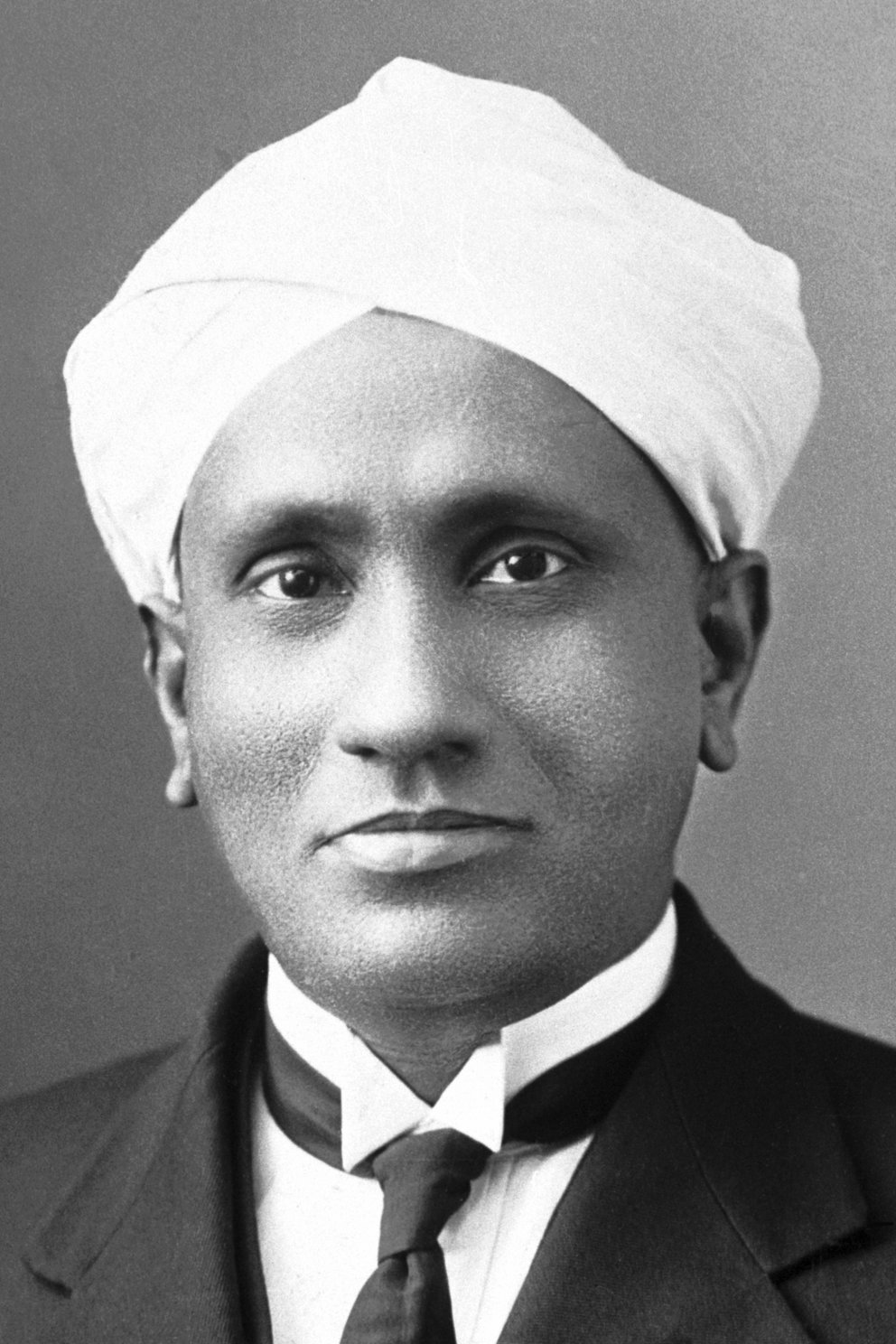
Raman

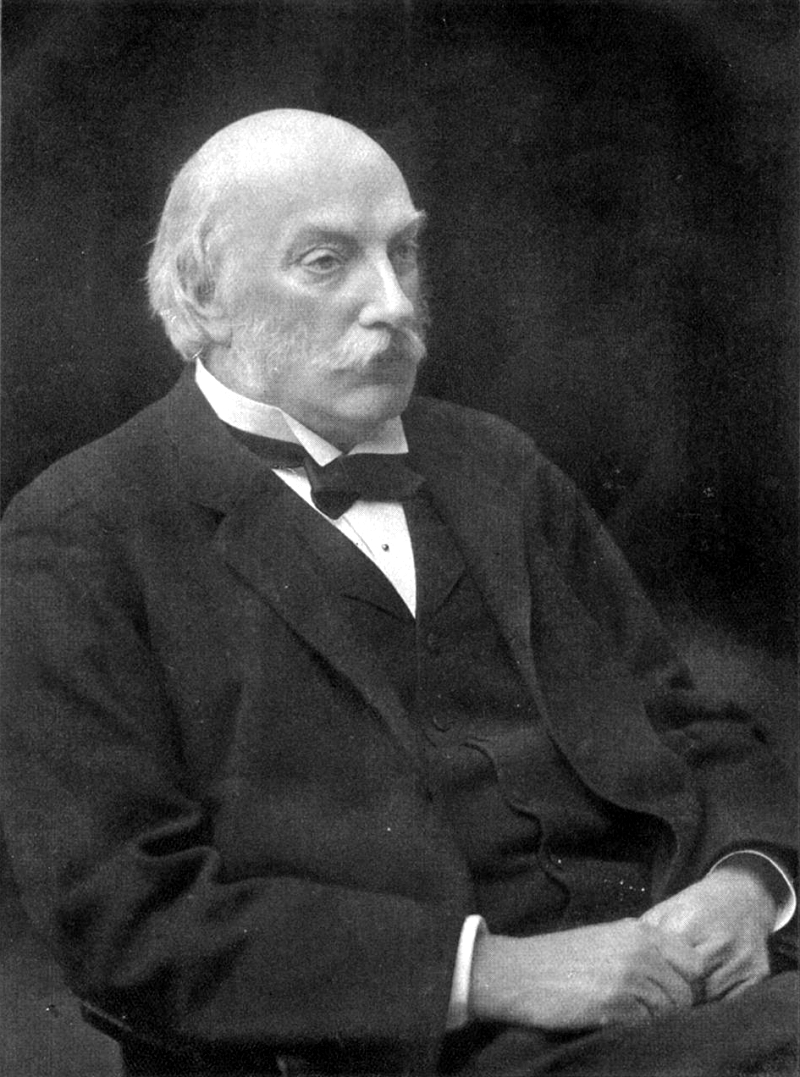
Rayleigh

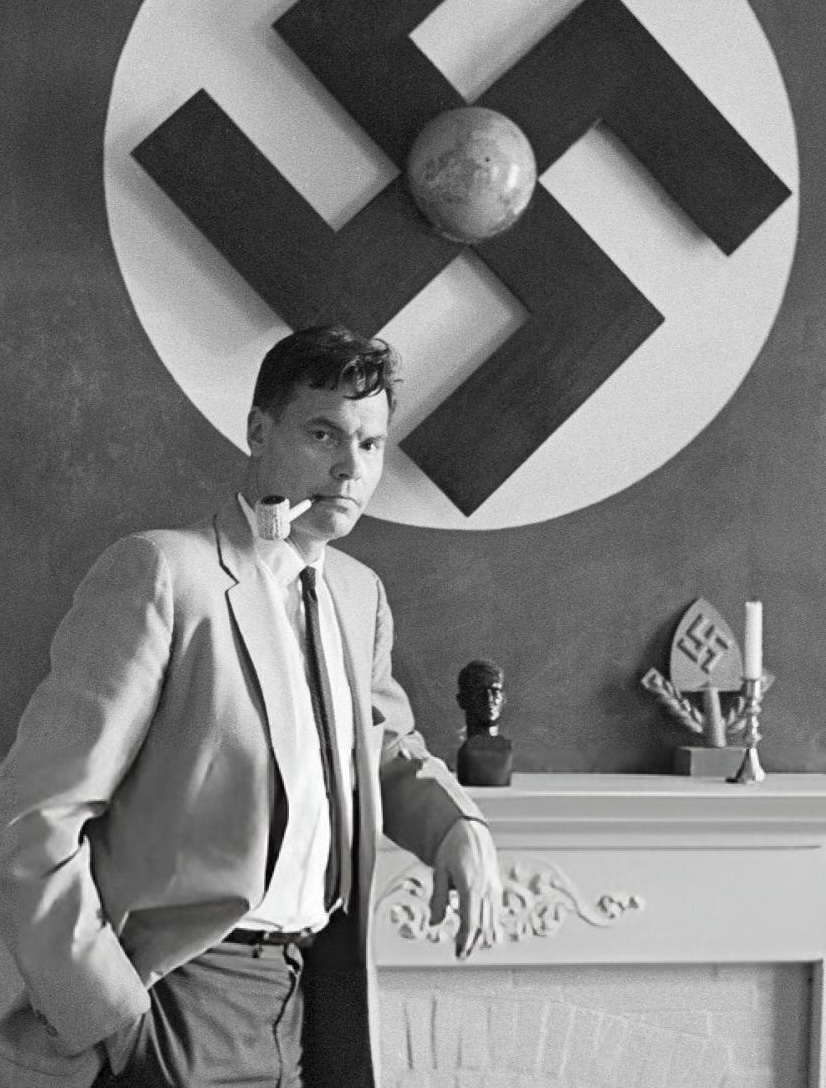
Rockwell

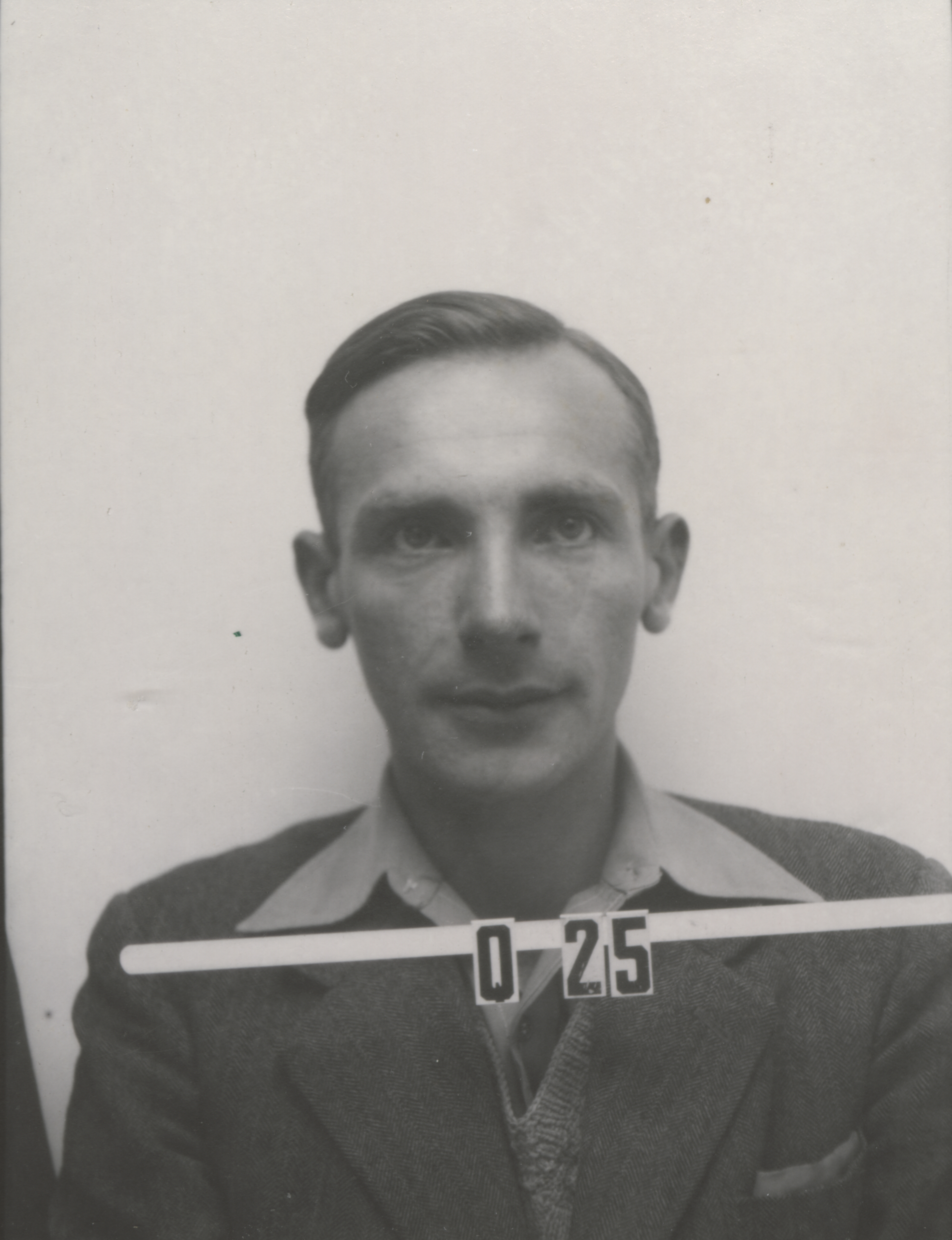
Rotblat

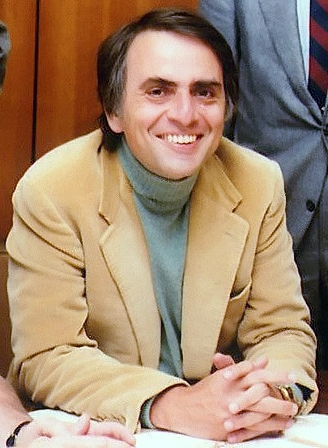
Sagan

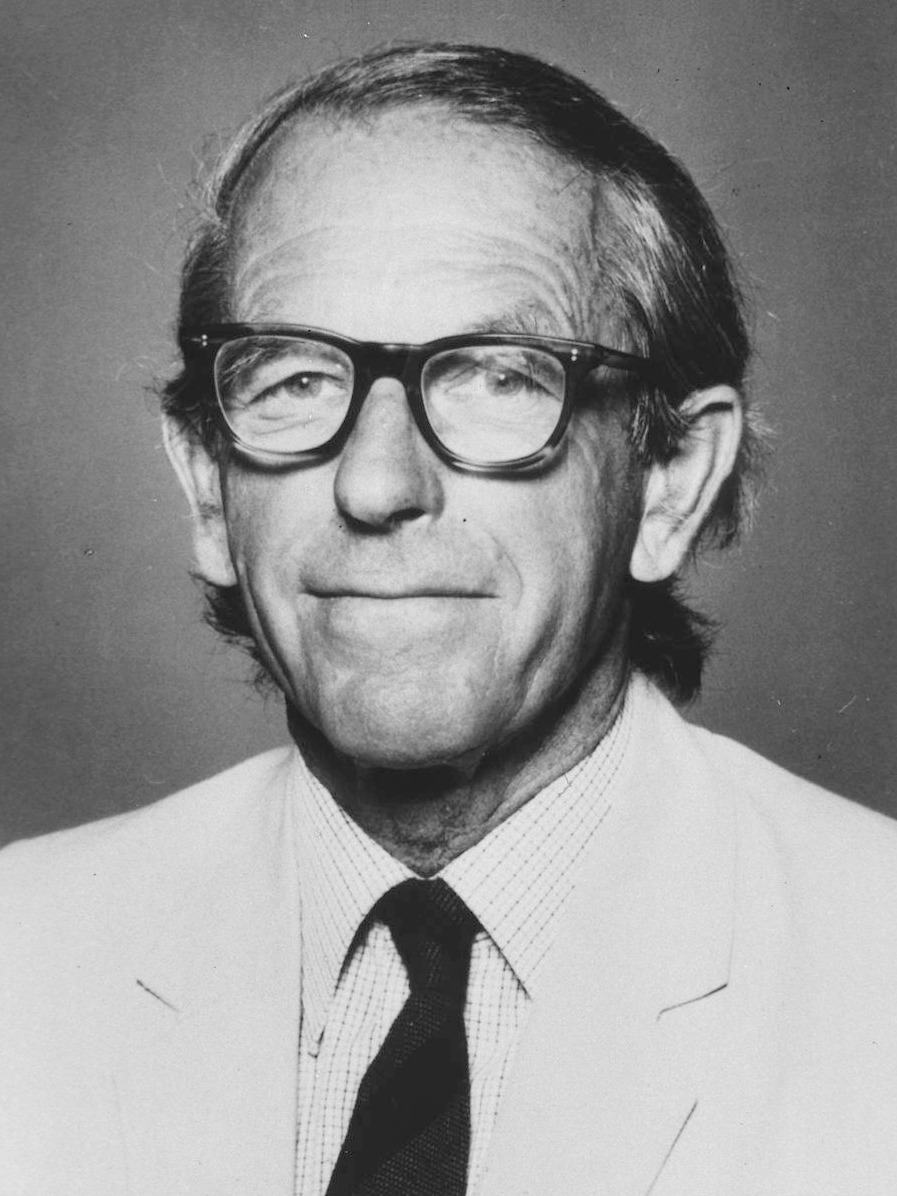
Sanger

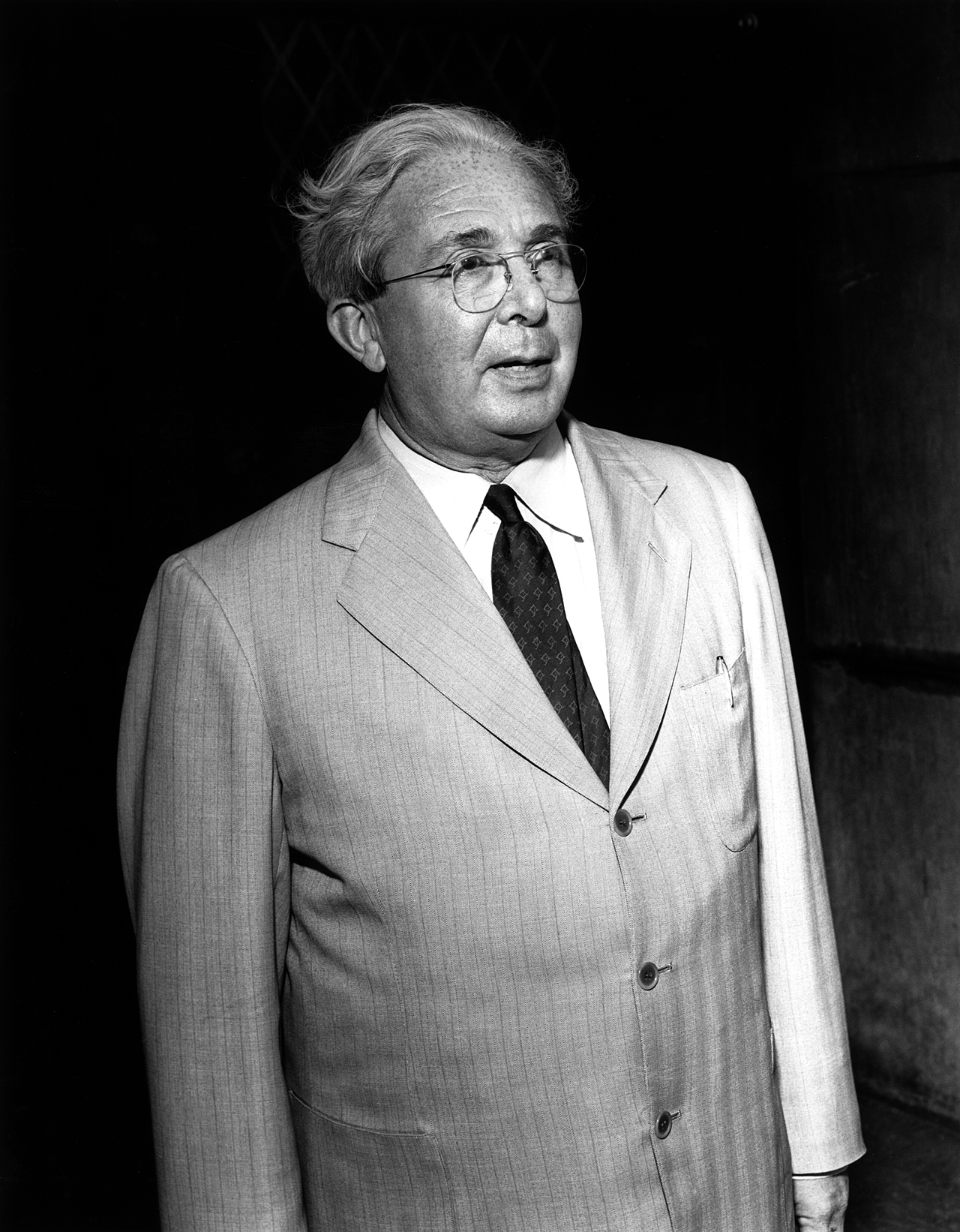
Szilárd

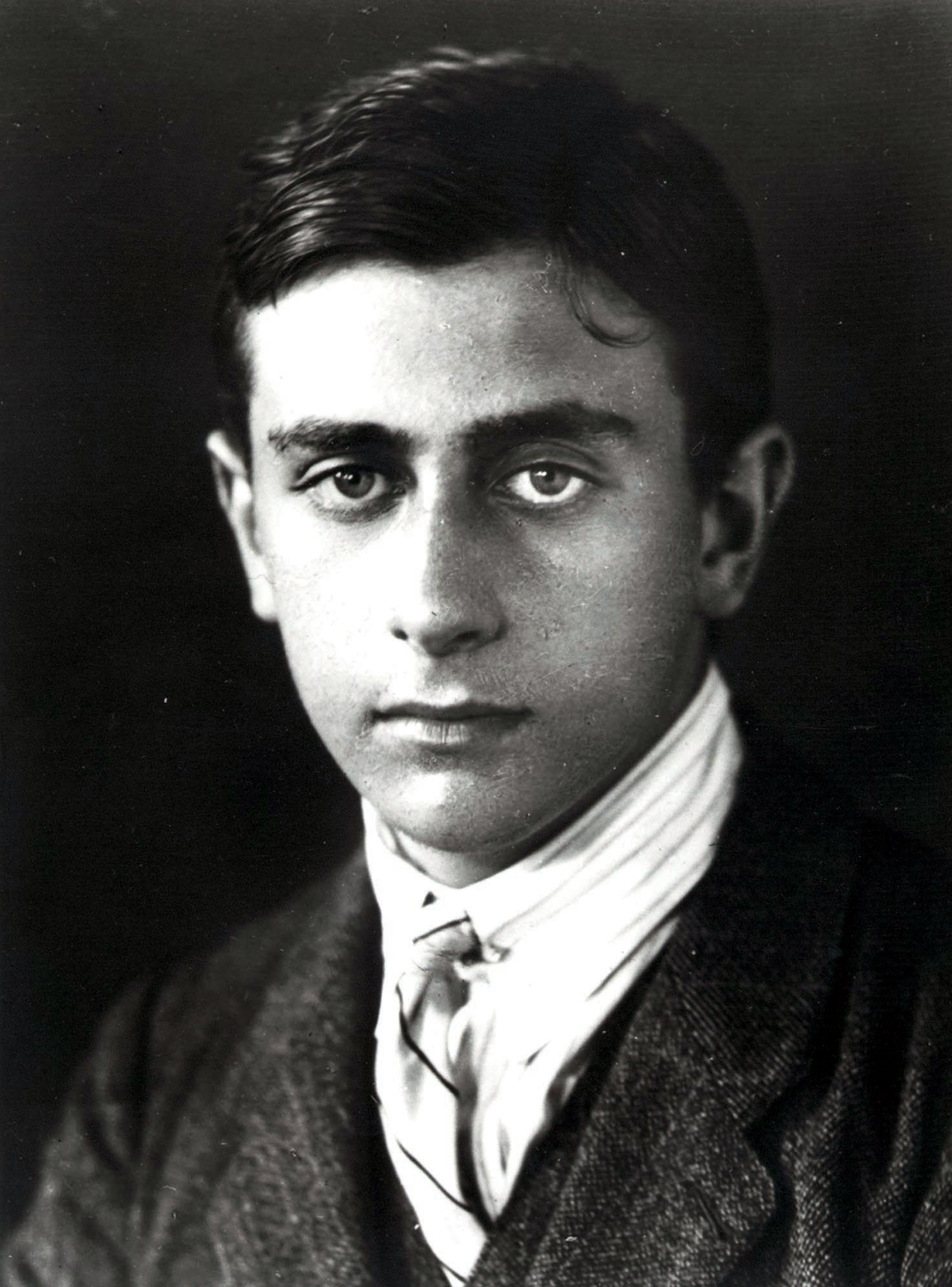
Teller

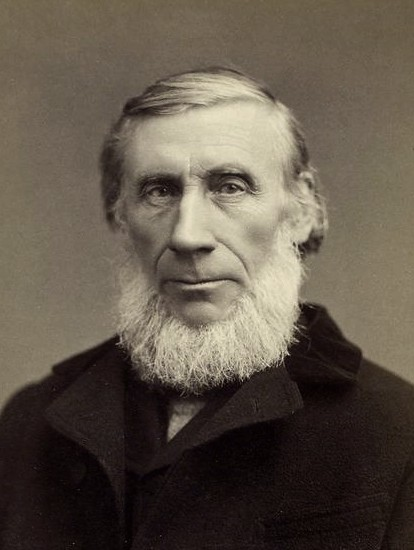
Tyndall

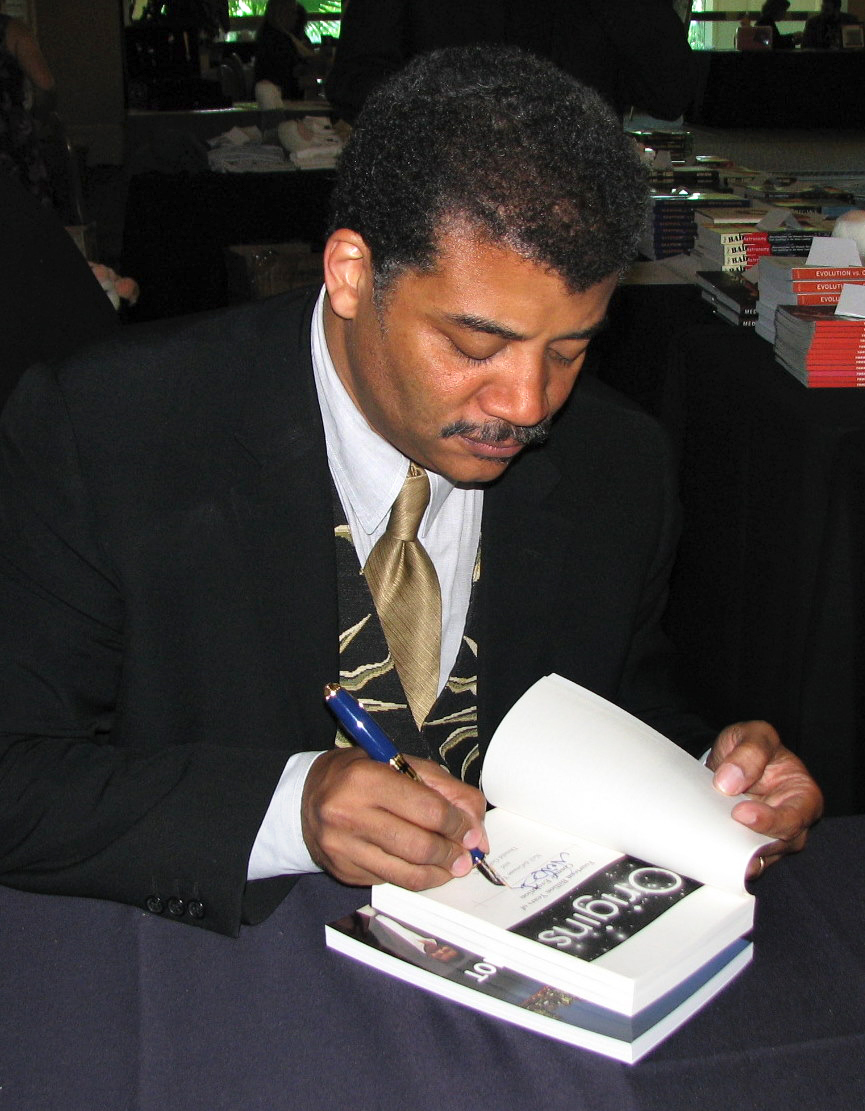
Tyson

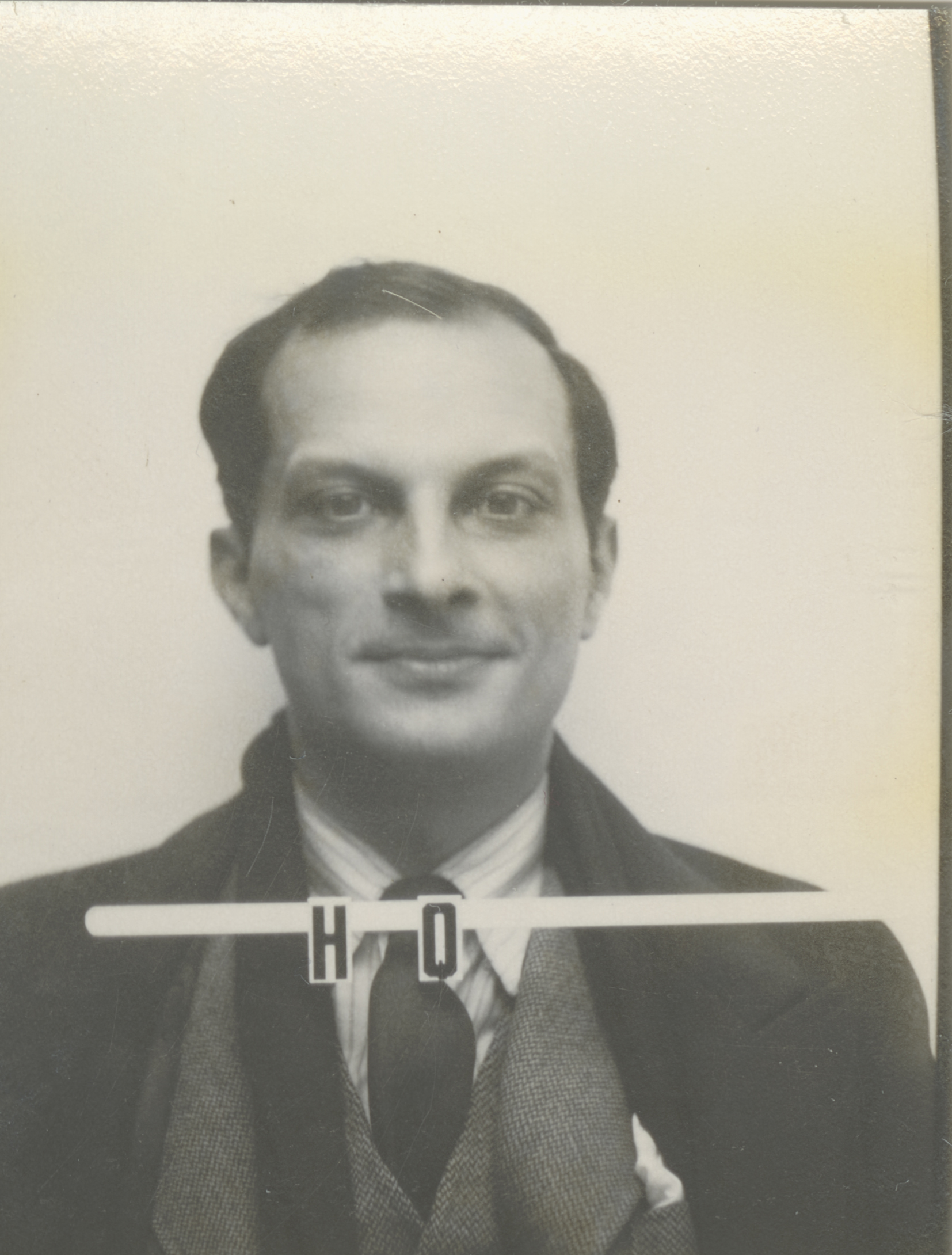
Ulam

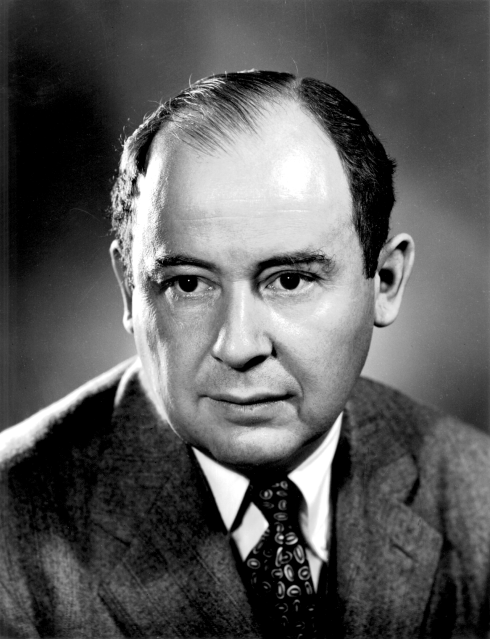
von Neumann

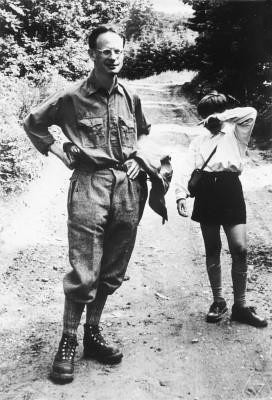
Weil

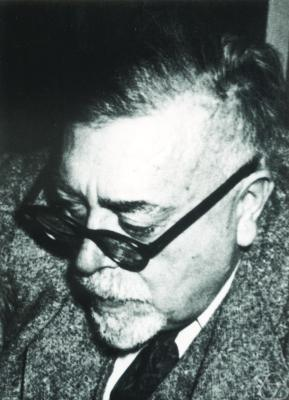
Wiener

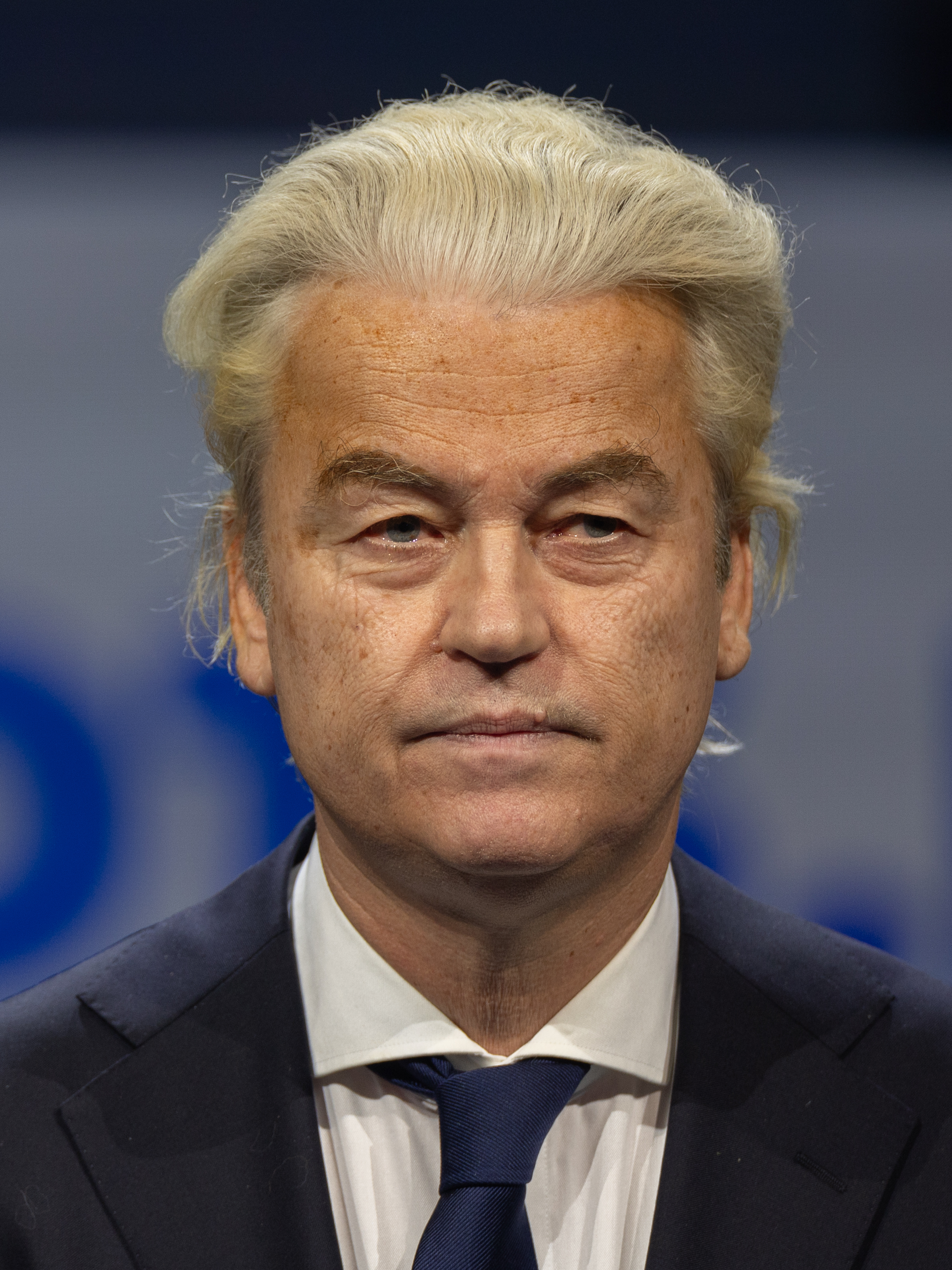
Wilders

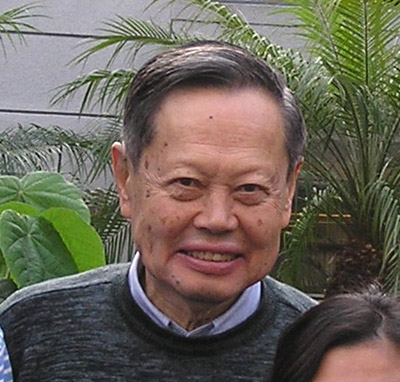
Yang

=== Activists and authors ===
- Saul Alinsky (1909–1972): American community organizer and writer; Rules for Radicals.
- Poul Anderson (1926–2001): American science fiction author.
- Piers Anthony (born 1934): English-American writer of science fiction and fantasy.
- Susan B. Anthony (1820–1906): American civil rights leader who played a pivotal role in the 19th century women's rights movement to introduce women's suffrage into the United States; co-founder of the first Women's Temperance Movement with Elizabeth Cady Stanton as President.
- Hannah Arendt (1906–1975): German American writer and political theorist.
- Margaret Atwood (born 1939): Canadian poet, novelist, literary critic, essayist, teacher, environmental activist, and inventor.
- Samuel Beckett (1906–1989): Irish avant-garde novelist, playwright, theatre director, and poet; awarded the Nobel Prize in Literature in 1969.
- Ambrose Bierce (1842 – c. 1914): American editorialist, journalist, short story writer, fabulist and satirist; known for his short story "An Occurrence at Owl Creek Bridge" and his satirical lexicon The Devil's Dictionary.
- Jorge Luis Borges (1899–1986): Argentine writer.
- Henry Cadbury (1883–1974): American biblical scholar and Quaker who contributed to the New Revised Standard Version of the Bible.
- Thomas Carlyle (1795–1881): Scottish satirical writer, essayist, historian and teacher during the Victorian era.
- Ariel Dorfman (born 1942): Argentine/Chilean novelist, playwright, essayist, academic, and human rights activist.
- Arthur Conan Doyle (1859–1930): Scottish physician and writer; known for his stories about the detective Sherlock Holmes; a prolific writer whose other works include science fiction stories, plays, romances, poetry, non-fiction and historical novels.
- W.E.B. Du Bois (1868–1963): American sociologist, historian, civil rights activist, Pan-Africanist, author and editor; co-founder of the National Association for the Advancement of Colored People (NAACP) in 1909.
- Bart D. Ehrman (born 1955): American New Testament scholar and "a happy agnostic".
- Edward FitzGerald (1809–1883): English poet and writer, best known as the poet of the first and most famous English translation of The Rubaiyat of Omar Khayyam
- Betty Friedan (1921–2006): American writer, activist and feminist; a leading figure in the women's movement in the United States; her 1963 book, The Feminine Mystique, is often credited with sparking the "second wave" of American feminism in the 20th century.
- Frederick James Furnivall (1825–1910): English second editor of the Oxford English Dictionary.
- John Galsworthy (1867–1933): English novelist and playwright; The Forsyte Saga (1906–1921) and its sequels, A Modern Comedy and End of the Chapter; won the Nobel Prize in Literature in 1932
- Neil Gaiman (born 1960): English author of short fiction, novels, comic books, graphic novels, audio theatre and films including the comic book series The Sandman and novels Stardust, American Gods, Coraline, and The Graveyard Book.
- Maxim Gorky (1868–1936): Russian and Soviet author who brought Socialist Realism to literature.
- Thomas Hardy (1840–1928): English novelist and poet; while his works typically belong to the Naturalism movement, several poems display elements of the previous Romantic and Enlightenment periods of literature, such as his fascination with the supernatural.
- Sadegh Hedayat (1903–1951): Iranian author and writer.
- Robert A. Heinlein (1907–1988): American science fiction writer.
- Joseph Heller (1923–1999): American satirical novelist, short story writer, and playwright; Catch-22.
- Alexander Herzen (1812–1870): Russian writer and thinker; the "father of Russian socialism"; one of the main fathers of agrarian populism.
- Aldous Huxley (1894–1963): English writer of novels, such as Brave New World, and wide-ranging essays.
- A.J. Jacobs (born 1968): American author.
- James Joyce (1882–1941): Irish novelist and poet, considered to be one of the most influential writers in the modernist avant-garde movement of the early 20th century; best known for his novel Ulysses.
- Franz Kafka (1883–1924): Czech-born Jewish writer.
- John Keats (1795–1821): English Romantic poet.
- Janusz Korczak (1878 or 1879–1942): Polish Jewish educator, children's author and pediatrician. After spending many years working as director of an orphanage in Warsaw, Korczak refused freedom and remained with the orphans as they were sent to Treblinka extermination camp during the Grossaktion Warsaw of 1942.
- Stanisław Lem (1921–2006): Polish science fiction novelist and essayist.
- H. P. Lovecraft (1890–1937): American writer of strange fiction and horror.
- Lucretius (99 BC–55 BC): Roman poet and philosopher.
- Bernard Malamud (1914–1986): American author of novels and short stories; one of the great American Jewish authors of the 20th century.
- H. L. Mencken (1880–1956): German-American journalist, satirist, social critic, cynic and freethinker, known as the "Sage of Baltimore".
- Thomas Mann (1875–1955): German novelist, short story writer, social critic, philanthropist, essayist, and 1929 Nobel Prize laureate, known for his series of highly symbolic and ironic epic novels and novellas, noted for their insight into the psychology of the artist and the intellectual.
- Vladimir Nabokov (1899–1977): Russian novelist, poet and short story writer; known for his novel Lolita.
- Eugene O'Neill (1888–1953), American playwright; won the Nobel Prize in Literature in 1936.
- Larry Niven (born 1938): American science fiction author; Ringworld (1970).
- Fernando Pessoa (1888–1935): Portuguese poet, writer, literary critic and translator, described as one of the most significant literary figures of the 20th century and one of the greatest poets in Portuguese.
- Marcel Proust (1871–1922): French novelist, critic and essayist, known for his work In Search of Lost Time.
- Philip Pullman (born 1946): English children's author of the trilogy His Dark Materials; has said that he is technically an agnostic, though he also calls himself an atheist.
- Alexander Pushkin (1799–1837): Russian author of the Romantic era, considered by many to be the greatest Russian poet and the founder of modern Russian literature.
- Edward Said (1935–2003): Palestinian-American literary theorist and advocate for Palestinian rights; university professor of English and Comparative Literature at Columbia University; a founding figure in postcolonialism.
- Arthur M. Schlesinger Jr. (1917–2007): American historian and Pulitzer Prize–winning writer.
- Mary Shelley (1797–1851): English novelist, short story writer, dramatist, essayist, biographer, and travel writer, best known for her Gothic novel Frankenstein (1818).
- Edward Snowden (born 1983): American computer specialist, privacy activist and former CIA employee and NSA contractor; disclosed classified details of several top-secret United States and British government mass surveillance programs.
- Elizabeth Cady Stanton (1815–1902): American social activist, abolitionist, and leading figure of the early woman's movement. Her Declaration of Sentiments, presented at the Seneca Falls Convention held in 1848 in Seneca Falls, New York, is often credited with initiating the first organized woman's rights and woman's suffrage movements in the United States. Late in life she led the effort to write the Woman's Bible to correct the injustices she perceived against women in the Bible.
- Olaf Stapledon (1886–1950): English philosopher and author of several influential works of science fiction.
- John Steinbeck (1902–1968): American writer known for novels such as The Grapes of Wrath and East of Eden; won the Nobel Prize in Literature in 1962
- Stendhal (1783–1842) (a.k.a. Marie-Henri Beyle): French writer.
- Boris Strugatsky (1925–2012): Soviet-Russian science fiction author who collaborated with his brother, Arkady Strugatsky, on various works; their novel Piknik na obochine was translated into English as Roadside Picnic in 1977 and was filmed by Andrei Tarkovsky under the title Stalker.
- Charles Templeton (1915–2001): Canadian evangelist; author of A Farewell to God.
- Thucydides (c. 460–c. 395): Greek historian and author from Alimos. His History of the Peloponnesian War recounts the 5th-century BC war between Sparta and Athens to the year 411 BC. Thucydides has been dubbed the father of "scientific history", because of his strict standards of evidence-gathering and analysis in terms of cause and effect without reference to intervention by the gods, as outlined in his introduction to his work.
- Ivan Turgenev (1818–1883): Russian novelist, short-story writer and playwright; author of A Sportsman's Sketches and of Fathers and Sons.
- Mark Twain (1835–1910): American humorist, satirist, lecturer and writer, most noted for his novels Adventures of Huckleberry Finn and The Adventures of Tom Sawyer; has also been identified a deist.
- Adam Bruno Ulam (1922–2000): Polish and American historian and political scientist at Harvard University; one of the world's foremost authorities on Russia and the Soviet Union, and the author of twenty books and many articles.
- Ibn Warraq (born 1946): known for his books critical of Islam.
- Hale White (1831–1913): British writer and civil servant.
- Robert Anton Wilson (1932–2007): American author and futurologist
- Mary Wollstonecraft (1759–1797): English writer, philosopher, and advocate of women's rights. During her brief career, she wrote novels, treatises, a travel narrative, a history of the French Revolution, a conduct book, and a children's book. Wollstonecraft is best known for A Vindication of the Rights of Woman (1792), in which she argues that women are not naturally inferior to men, but appear to be only because they lack education. She suggests that both men and women should be treated as rational beings and imagines a social order founded on reason.
- David Yallop (1937–2018): English true crime author.
- Émile Zola (1840–1902): French writer; prominent figure in the literary school of naturalism; important contributor to the development of theatrical naturalism.

=== Business ===
- Leslie Alexander (born 1943): American sports owner, owner of the Houston Rockets
- Warren Buffett (born 1930): American investor; identified himself as agnostic in response to Warren Allen Smith, who had asked him whether he believed in God
- Henry Dunant (1828–1910): Swiss businessman and social activist; founder of International Committee of the Red Cross; in 1901 he received the first Nobel Peace Prize, together with Frédéric Passy
- Elon Musk (born 1971): South African American inventor and entrepreneur best known for founding SpaceX and co-founding Tesla Motors and PayPal (originally X.com)
- Ted Turner (1938–2026): American founder of Turner Broadcasting System, now part of Time Warner

=== Media and arts ===
- John Adams (born 1947): American composer
- Hideaki Anno (born 1960): Japanese animation and film director; known for his work on the popular anime series Neon Genesis Evangelion
- Billie Joe Armstrong (born 1972): American Musician and band member of Green Day
- Simon Baker (born 1969): Australian television and movie actor
- David Bazan (born 1976): American singer, songwriter, musician and former frontman of Pedro The Lion, an indie rock outfit associated with Christian rock that was controversial among Christians for their language and off-kilter views about religion; his solo career has been focused around his newfound agnosticism.
- Monica Bellucci (born 1964): Italian actress and fashion model
- Tom Bergeron (born 1955): American television personality and game show host; host of America's Funniest Home Videos, Hollywood Squares and Dancing with the Stars
- Ingmar Bergman (1918–2007): Swedish director, writer and producer for film, stage and television
- Irving Berlin (1888–1989): American composer and lyricist of Jewish heritage, author of God Bless America.
- Hector Berlioz (1803–1869): French Romantic composer
- Gael García Bernal (born 1978): Mexican actor and director; claims to be "culturally Catholic" and "spiritually agnostic"
- Lewis Black (born 1948): American stand-up comedian, author, playwright, social critic and actor
- Johannes Brahms (1833–1897): German composer and pianist
- Georges Brassens (1921–1981): French singer-songwriter and poet
- Benjamin Britten (1913–1976): English composer, conductor, and pianist; a central figure of 20th-century British classical music
- Gavin Bryars (born 1943): English composer and double bassist
- Rose Byrne (born 1979), Australian actress
- Dick Cavett (born 1936): American television talk show host
- Charlie Chaplin (1889–1977): English comic actor, film director and composer best known for his work in the United States during the silent film era
- Aaron Copland (1900–1990): American composer
- Salvador Dalí (1904–1989): Spanish surrealist painter born in Figueres, Spain. Dalí, a skilled draftsman, became best known for the striking and bizarre images in his surrealist work. His painterly skills are often attributed to the influence of Renaissance masters. His arguably best-known work, The Persistence of Memory, was completed in 1931. Dalí's expansive artistic repertoire included film, sculpture, and photography, in collaboration with a range of artists in a variety of media. He allegedly claimed to be both an agnostic and a Roman Catholic.
- Miles Davis (1926–1991): American trumpeter, bandleader, and composer.
- Daniel Day-Lewis (born 1957): English-Irish actor, three-time Academy Award for Best Actor winner
- Leonardo DiCaprio (born 1974): American actor
- Ronnie James Dio (1942–2010): American heavy metal singer (Elf, Rainbow, Black Sabbath, Dio, Heaven & Hell)
- Richard Dreyfuss (born 1947): American actor
- Thomas Eakins (1844–1916): American realist painter, photographer, sculptor, and fine arts educator; widely acknowledged to be one of the most important artists in American art history
- Christopher Eccleston (born 1964): English actor
- Zac Efron (born 1987): American actor, star of movies such as High School Musical and 17 Again; was raised agnostic (his paternal grandfather was Jewish)
- Billie Eilish (born 2001): American singer and songwriter
- Carrie Fisher (1956–2016): American actress, screenwriter and novelist
- Gabriel Fauré (1845–1924): French composer, organist, pianist and teacher; one of the foremost French composers of his generation; his musical style influenced many 20th-century composers
- Henry Fonda (1905–1982): American film and stage actor
- Emilia Fox (born 1974): English actress
- William Friedkin (1935–2023): American film and television director, producer and screenwriter, known for directing the action thriller film The French Connection and the supernatural horror film The Exorcist.
- Gilberto Gil (born 1942): Brazilian singer, guitarist, and songwriter, known for both his musical innovation and political commitment
- Jean-Luc Godard (1930–2022): French-Swiss film director, screenwriter and film critic; often identified with the 1960s French film movement La Nouvelle Vague, or "New Wave"
- Matt Groening (born 1954): American creator of animated TV series The Simpsons and Futurama, and the comic Life in Hell
- Bob Guccione (1930–2010): American founder and publisher of Penthouse magazine
- Neil Patrick Harris (born 1973): American actor, producer, singer, and director; best known for Doogie Howser, M.D. and How I Met Your Mother; as a child, belonged to an Episcopal Church with his family, where his parents sing in a choir; has designated himself as an agnostic on his Myspace
- Hergé (1907–1983): Belgian cartoonist; creator of The Adventures of Tintin
- Gustav Holst (1874–1934): English composer, arranger and teacher; best known for his orchestral suite The Planets; composed a large number of works across a range of genres, although none achieved comparable success
- John Humphrys (born 1943): English radio and television presenter who hosted a series of programmes interviewing religious leaders, Humphrys in Search of God
- Leoš Janáček (1854–1928): Czech composer
- Gene Kelly (1912–1996): American dancer, actor, singer, film director and producer, and choreographer
- Myles Kennedy (born 1969): American musician, singer, and songwriter; lead vocalist and guitarist of the rock band Alter Bridge
- Larry King (1933–2021): host of Larry King Live
- Janez Lapajne (born 1967): Slovenian film director, producer, screenwriter, film editor and production designer
- Cloris Leachman (1926–2021): American actress
- Stan Lee (1922–2018) American comic book writer, editor, actor, producer, publisher, television personality; former president and chairman of Marvel Comics
- Lemmy (1945–2015): English rock singer and bass guitarist; founder of the rock band Motörhead
- Joe Lipari also known as J.R. Lipari, (born October 5, 1979) is an American comedian, artist, agnostic minister & yoga teacher.
- James Hetfield (born 1963): American heavy metal singer and rhythm guitarist; co-founder of the heavy metal band Metallica
- Annie Lennox (born 1954): Scottish recording artist
- Andrew Lloyd Webber (born 1948): Lloyd Webber views Jesus as "one of the great figures of history" and wrote the rock opera Jesus Christ Superstar about him. The opera was controversial with conservative Christian groups.
- René Magritte (1898–1967): Belgian surrealist artist
- Gustav Mahler (1860–1911): Austrian Late-Romantic composer and conductor
- Dave Matthews (born 1967): American musician and actor
- Brian May (born 1947): English musician and astrophysicist most widely known as the guitarist, songwriter and occasional singer of the rock band Queen
- Paul McCartney (born 1942): English musician, singer and composer
- David Mitchell (born 1974): British actor, comedian and writer
- Edvard Munch (1863–1944): Norwegian Symbolist painter, printmaker and an important forerunner of expressionist art; known for The Scream
- Ernest Newman (1868–1959): English music critic and musicologist
- Conor Oberst (born 1980): American singer-songwriter; fronts the band Bright Eyes
- Hubert Parry (1848–1918): English composer, teacher and historian of music
- Pedro Pascal (born 1975): Chilean and American actor
- Neil Peart (1952–2020): Canadian drummer and lyricist for progressive rock band Rush; many Rush song lyrics criticize religion and theism
- Sean Penn (born 1960): American actor, twice winner of the Academy Award for Best Actor
- Brendan Perry (born 1959): English singer and multi-instrumentalist best known for his work as the male half of the duo Dead Can Dance with Lisa Gerrard
- Chris Pine (born 1980): American actor
- Brad Pitt (born 1963): American actor; stated that he did not believe in God, and that he was mostly agnostic
- Sidney Poitier (1927–2022): Bahamian American actor, film director, author, and diplomat; his views are closer to deism
- Hugo Riemann (1849–1919): German music theorist and composer
- Joe Rogan (born 1967): American comedian, podcaster, social critic and UFC color commentator
- Andy Rooney (1919–2011): American broadcast personality; specified that he was an agnostic and not an atheist, but also called himself an atheist
- Tim Rice (born 1944): Wrote the rock opera Jesus Christ Superstar about Jesus. The opera was controversial with conservative Christians.
- Franz Schubert (1797–1828): Austrian composer
- Robert Schumann (1810–1856): German composer and influential music critic; widely regarded as one of the greatest composers of the Romantic era
- Ridley Scott (born 1937): English film director and producer; Alien (1979), Blade Runner
- Adrienne Shelly (1966–2006): American actor, screenwriter and director
- Rogério Skylab (born 1956): Brazilian singer-songwriter, poet and essayist, notorious for the underground hit "Matador de Passarinho"
- Jenny Slate (born 1982): American actor
- Richard Strauss (1864–1949): German composer of the late Romantic and early modern eras
- Howard Stern (born 1954): American radio personality, television host, author, actor, and photographer
- Sting (born 1951): English musician and lead singer of The Police
- Emma Stone (born 1988): American actor
- Matt Stone (born 1971): American co-creator of the cartoon series South Park; considers himself an agnostic Jew (his mother is Jewish), though he has also denied the existence of God
- Osamu Tezuka (1928–1989): Japanese cartoonist, manga artist, animator, producer, activist and medical doctor; creator of Astro Boy, Kimba the White Lion and Black Jack; often credited as the "godfather of anime", and is often considered the Japanese equivalent to Walt Disney
- Jhonen Vasquez (born 1974): American comic book writer, and cartoonist; known for the animated series Invader Zim
- Giuseppe Verdi (1813–1901): Italian composer, one of the most influential of the 19th century
- Montel Williams (born 1956): American television host, actor and motivational speaker.
- Ralph Vaughan Williams (1872–1958): British composer. Despite the variety of his works with religious connections, Vaughan Williams was decidedly not a believer. According to his classmate Bertrand Russell, Williams was an atheist while attending Cambridge. According to his widow, he later became an agnostic.

=== Philosophy ===
==== Idealistic agnostics ====
- Confucius (551 BC–479 BC): Chinese teacher, editor, politician, and philosopher of the Spring and Autumn Period of Chinese history. The philosophy of Confucius emphasized personal and governmental morality, correctness of social relationships, justice and sincerity. His followers competed successfully with many other schools during the Hundred Schools of Thought era only to be suppressed in favor of the Legalists during the Qin Dynasty. Following the victory of Han over Chu after the collapse of Qin, Confucius's thoughts received official sanction and were further developed into a Chinese religious system known as Confucianism.
- Immanuel Kant (1724–1804): German philosopher; known for Critique of Pure Reason
- Laozi (born 604 BC): Chinese religious philosopher; author of the Tao Te Ching; this association has led him to be traditionally considered the founder of philosophical religion Taoism

==== Unclassified philosophers-agnostics ====
- Isaiah Berlin (1909–1997): British social and political theorist, philosopher and historian of ideas of Russian-Jewish origin, thought by many to be the dominant scholar of his generation
- Noam Chomsky (born 1928): American linguist, philosopher, political activist, author; lecturer, Institute Professor and professor emeritus of linguistics at the Massachusetts Institute of Technology; credited with the creation of the theory of generative grammar
- Democritus (460 BC – 370 BC): Ancient Greek philosopher; influential pre-Socratic philosopher and pupil of Leucippus, who formulated an atomic theory for the cosmos
- John Dewey (1859–1952): American philosopher, psychologist and educational reformer; his ideas have been influential in education and social reform
- Epicurus (341 BCE–270 BCE): Ancient Greek philosopher and the founder of the school of philosophy called Epicureanism
- Fred Edwords (born 1948): longtime Humanist activist; national director of the United Coalition of Reason
- James Hall (born 1933): philosopher; describes himself as an agnostic Episcopalian
- Sidney Hook (1902–1989): American philosopher of the Pragmatist school known for his contributions to the philosophy of history, the philosophy of education, political theory, and ethics
- David Hume (1711–1776): Scottish philosopher, historian, economist, and essayist, known especially for his philosophical empiricism and scepticism. He was one of the most important figures in the history of Western philosophy and the Scottish Enlightenment. Hume is often grouped with John Locke, George Berkeley, and a handful of others as a British Empiricist.
- Edmund Husserl (1859–1938): German philosopher and mathematician and the founder of the 20th-century philosophical school of phenomenology
- Harold Innis (1894–1952): Canadian political philosopher and professor of political economy at the University of Toronto; author of seminal works on media, communication theory and Canadian economic history
- Anthony Kenny (born 1931): president of Royal Institute of Philosophy, wrote in his essay "Why I'm not an atheist" after justifying his agnostic position that "a claim to knowledge needs to be substantiated; ignorance need only be confessed".
- Thomas Kuhn (1922–1996): American historian and philosopher of science whose controversial 1962 book The Structure of Scientific Revolutions was deeply influential in both academic and popular circles, introducing the term "paradigm shift," which has since become an English-language staple
- G. E. Moore (1873–1958): English philosopher; one of the founders of the analytic tradition in philosophy
- Karl R. Popper (1902–1994): Philosopher of science; promoted falsifiability as a necessary criterion of empirical statements in science
- Protagoras (died 420 BCE): Greek Sophist; first major Humanist; wrote that the existence of the gods was unknowable
- Pyrrho (360 BC – c. 270 BC): Greek philosopher of classical antiquity; credited as being the first Skeptic philosopher and the inspiration for the school known as Pyrrhonism, founded by Aenesidemus in the 1st century BC
- Bertrand Russell (1872–1970): British philosopher and mathematician; considered himself a philosophical agnostic, but said that the label "atheist" conveyed a more accurate impression to "the ordinary man in the street"
- Michael Schmidt-Salomon (born 1967): German philosopher, author and former editor of MIZ (Contemporary Materials and Information: Political magazine for atheists and the irreligious) Schmidt-Salomon has specified that he is not a "pure atheist, but actually an agnostic."
- Herbert Spencer (1820–1903): English philosopher, biologist, sociologist, and prominent classical liberal political theorist of the Victorian era
- Theophrastus (c. 371 BC – 287 BC): Greek philosopher; a native of Eresos in Lesbos; the successor to Aristotle in the Peripatetic school.
- Ishwar Chandra Vidyasagar (1820–1891): Indian Bengali polymath; a key figure of the Bengal Renaissance
- Ludwig Wittgenstein (1889–1951): Austrian-British philosopher who worked primarily in logic, the philosophy of mathematics, the philosophy of mind, and the philosophy of language. He is best known for his philosophical works like the Tractatus Logico-Philosophicus and Philosophical Investigations.

=== Politics and law ===
- Pedro Abad Santos (1876–1945): Filipino Marxist politician
- Norman Angell (1872–1967): English lecturer, journalist, author, and politician; member of parliament for the Labour Party in England; awarded the Nobel Peace Prize in 1933
- Winston Churchill (1874–1965): British politician, Prime Minister of the United Kingdom (1940-1945 and 1951-1955).
- Nick Clegg (born 1967): British politician, Leader of the Liberal Democrats (2007-2015), Deputy Prime Minister of the United Kingdom (2010-2015).
- Sajid Javid, (born 1969): British politician, Chancellor of the Exchequer (2019-2020).
- Jacinda Ardern (born 1980): New Zealand politician, Prime Minister of New Zealand, 2017-2023.
- Clement Attlee (1883–1967): British politician, Prime Minister of the United Kingdom, 1945–1951
- James Callaghan (1912–2005): British politician, Prime Minister of the United Kingdom, (1976-1979)
- Harold Wilson (1916–1995): British politician, Prime Minister of the United Kingdom, (1964-1970 and 1974-1976)
- Michelle Bachelet (born 1951): Chilean politician, President of Chile, 2006–2010 and 2014–2018
- Gabriel Boric (born 1986): Chilean politician, President of Chile
- Jordan Bardella Bardella (born 1995): French politician
- Vincent Bugliosi (1934–2015): former Los Angeles County Deputy District Attorney; stated that, while agnostic, he was open to the ideas of deism
- Fernando Henrique Cardoso (born 1931): Brazilian politician, President of Brazil, 1995–2003
- Helen Clark (born 1950): New Zealand politician, Prime Minister of New Zealand, 1999–2008
- John Curtin (1885–1945): 14th Prime Minister of Australia
- Clarence Darrow (1857–1938): American lawyer; defended John T. Scopes' right to teach Darwin's theory of evolution in the famous Tennessee "Monkey Trial"
- Alan Dershowitz (born 1938): American lawyer, jurist and political commentator; author of Taking the Stand: My Life in the Law (2013)
- Carlos Gaviria Díaz (1937–2015): Colombian politician; said "I am an agnostic, like him Bertrand Russell"
- Willem Drees (1886–1988): Dutch politician, Prime Minister of the Netherlands, 1948–1958
- Heinz Fischer (born 1938): Austrian politician, President of Austria, 2004–2016
- Eamon Gilmore (born 1955): Irish politician, Tánaiste (Deputy Prime Minister) of the Republic of Ireland
- Boris van der Ham (born 1973): Dutch politician
- Mariëtte Hamer (born 1958): Dutch politician
- Bob Hawke (1929–2019): 23rd Prime Minister of Australia, 1983–1991
- François Hollande (born 1954): 24th President of France, 2012–2017
- Billy Hughes (1862–1952): 7th Prime Minister of Australia
- Robert G. Ingersoll (1833–1899): American political leader and orator known as "The Great Agnostic"
- Ivo Josipović (born 1957): Croatian politician and composer; third President of Croatia, 2010–2015
- Bob Kerrey (born 1943): American politician, Governor of Nebraska (1983–1987) and United States Senator from Nebraska (1989–2001)
- Wim Kok (1938–2018): Dutch politician, Prime Minister of the Netherlands, 1994–2002
- Bruno Kreisky (1911–1990): Austrian Federal Chancellor, 1970–1983
- Aleksander Kwaśniewski (born 1954): President of Poland, 1995–2005
- Ricardo Lagos (born 1938): First declared agnostic to be elected president of Chile
- John Key (born 1961): New Zealand politician, Prime Minister of New Zealand, 2008–2016
- Esther Ouwehand (born 1976): Dutch politician
- Jan Marijnissen (born 1952): Dutch politician
- François Mitterrand (1916–1996): President of France, 1981–1995
- Jawaharlal Nehru (1889–1964): Indian freedom-fighter and the country's first Prime Minister, 1947–1964
- Robert Owen (1771–1858): Welsh social reformer; a founder of utopian socialism and the cooperative movement
- Susan Rice (born 1964): Former United States Ambassador to the United Nations
- George Lincoln Rockwell (1918–1967): Founder of the American Nazi Party
- Siddaramaiah (born 1948): Former Karnataka Deputy CM
- Jens Stoltenberg (born 1959): Former Prime Minister of Norway; current Secretary General of NATO
- Cenk Uygur (born 1970): Turkish American columnist, political commentator, activist, former MSNBC host, co-founder of the American liberal/progressive political and social internet commentary program The Young Turks, founder of Wolf PAC
- Joop den Uyl (1919–1987): Dutch politician, Prime Minister of the Netherlands, 1973–1977
- Gerdi Verbeet (born 1951): Dutch politician, President of the House of Representatives since 2006.
- Geert Wilders (born 1963): Dutch politician, leader of the Party for Freedom
- Gough Whitlam (1916–2014): Prime Minister of Australia, 1972–1975
- Lee Kuan Yew (1923–2015): Employment lawyer, Prime Minister and Founding Father of Singapore
- Gerrit Zalm (born 1952): Dutch politician, Deputy Prime Minister of the Netherlands, 2003–2007
- José Luis Rodríguez Zapatero (born 1960): Former Prime Minister of Spain
- Emmanuel Macron (born 1977): 25th President of France, since 2017

=== Science and technology ===
- Haroon Ahmed (born 1936): British Pakistani scientist in the fields of microelectronics and electrical engineering
- Hannes Alfvén (1908–1995): Swedish electrical engineer and plasma physicist; recipient of 1970 Nobel Prize in Physics for his work on magnetohydrodynamics (MHD); known for describing the class of MHD waves now known as Alfvén waves
- Ralph Alpher (1921–2007): American cosmologist; known for the seminal paper on Big Bang nucleosynthesis, the Alpher–Bethe–Gamow paper
- Michael Atiyah (1929–2015): British-Lebanese mathematician specialising in geometry. He was awarded the Fields Medal in 1966 and the Abel Prize in 2004.
- Sir David Attenborough (born 1926): English natural history presenter and anthropologist
- Hertha Marks Ayrton (1854–1923): English engineer, mathematician and inventor
- John Logie Baird (1888–1946): Scottish engineer and inventor of the world's first practical, publicly demonstrated television system, and of the world's first fully electronic colour television tube
- Róbert Bárány (1876–1936): Austro-Hungarian otologist; for his work on the physiology and pathology of the vestibular apparatus of the ear, he received the 1914 Nobel Prize in Physiology or Medicine
- John Bardeen (1908–1991): American physicist and electrical engineer; the only person to have won the Nobel Prize in Physics twice: first in 1956 with William Shockley and Walter Brattain for the invention of the transistor; and again in 1972 with Leon N Cooper and John Robert Schrieffer for a fundamental theory of conventional superconductivity known as the BCS theory
- Alexander Graham Bell (1847–1922): Eminent scientist, inventor, engineer and innovator; credited with inventing the first practical telephone
- Richard E. Bellman (1920–1984): American applied mathematician, celebrated for his invention of dynamic programming in 1953, and important contributions in other fields of mathematics
- Emile Berliner (1851–1929): German-born American inventor; known for developing the disc record gramophone (phonograph in American English)
- Claude Bernard (1813–1878): French physiologist; first to define the term milieu intérieur (now known as homeostasis, a term coined by Walter Bradford Cannon)
- Nicolaas Bloembergen (1920–2017): Dutch-American physicist; shared the 1981 Nobel Prize in Physics with Arthur Schawlow and Kai Siegbahn for their work in laser spectroscopy
- David Bohm (1917–1992): American-born British quantum physicist who contributed to theoretical physics, philosophy of mind, neuropsychology
- George Boole (1815–1864): English mathematician and logician; known for developing Boolean algebra; has also been labeled a deist
- Robert Bosch (1861–1942): German industrialist, engineer and inventor, founder of Robert Bosch GmbH
- Jagadish Chandra Bose (1858–1937): Indian polymath: physicist, biologist, botanist, archaeologist, early writer of science fiction; pioneered the investigation of radio and microwave optics, made very significant contributions to plant science, and laid the foundations of experimental science in the Indian subcontinent; invented the crescograph
- Jacob Bronowski (1908–1974): Polish-Jewish British mathematician, biologist, historian of science, theatre author, poet and inventor; presenter and writer of the 1973 BBC television documentary series The Ascent of Man, and the accompanying boo
- Frank Macfarlane Burnet (1899–1985): Australian virologist; known for his contributions to immunology; received the 1960 Nobel Prize in Physiology or Medicine for demonstrating acquired immune tolerance and developing the theory of clonal selection
- Santiago Ramón y Cajal (1852–1934): Spanish pathologist, histologist, neuroscientist; considered by many to be the father of modern neuroscience; won the Nobel Prize in Physiology or Medicine in 1906
- Wallace Carothers (1896–1937): American chemist and inventor; credited with the invention of nylon
- Henry Cavendish (1731–1810): British scientist; noted for his discovery of hydrogen or what he called "inflammable air"; known for the Cavendish experiment, his measurement of the Earth's density, and early research into electricity
- Francis Crick (1916–2004): Nobel-laureate co-discoverer of the structure of DNA; described himself as a skeptic and an agnostic with "a strong inclination towards atheism"
- Marie Curie (1867–1934): Polish physicist and chemist; pioneer in the field of radioactivity; the first to win two Nobel Prizes in two different sciences: the Nobel Prize in Physics in 1903 and the Nobel Prize in Chemistry in 1911
- Heber Doust Curtis (1872–1942): American astronomer; known for his participation in the Great Debate with Harlow Shapley on the nature of nebulae and galaxies, and the size of the universe
- Charles Darwin (1809–1882): Founder of the theory of evolution by natural selection; once described himself as being generally agnostic, though he was a member of the Anglican Church and attended Unitarian services
- David Deutsch (born 1953): British physicist at the University of Oxford; pioneered the field of quantum computation by formulating a description for a quantum Turing machine, as well as specifying an algorithm designed to run on a quantum computer
- Paul Dirac (1902–1984): British theoretical physicist; a founder of quantum mechanics; predicted the existence of antimatter; won the Nobel Prize in Physics in 1933
- Eugène Dubois (1858–1940): Dutch paleoanthropologist and geologist; earned worldwide fame for his discovery of Pithecanthropus erectus (later redesignated Homo erectus), or 'Java Man'
- Émile Durkheim (1858–1917): French sociologist; had a Jewish bar mitzvah at thirteen, was briefly interested in Catholicism after a mystical experience, but later became an agnostic
- Freeman Dyson (1923–2020): British-born American theoretical physicist and mathematician, famous for his work in quantum electrodynamics, solid-state physics, astronomy and nuclear engineering
- Albert Einstein (1879–1955): German theoretical physicist, best known for his theory of relativity and the mass–energy equivalence, $E = m c^2$
- John Ericsson (1803–1889): Swedish-American inventor and mechanical engineer
- Enrico Fermi (1901–1954): Italian-American physicist; known for his work on the development of the first nuclear reactor, Chicago Pile-1, and for his contributions to the development of quantum theory, nuclear and particle physics, and statistical mechanics; awarded the 1938 Nobel Prize in Physics for his work on induced radioactivity
- Edmond H. Fischer (1920–2021): Swiss American biochemist; he and his collaborator Edwin G. Krebs were awarded the Nobel Prize in Physiology or Medicine in 1992 for describing how reversible phosphorylation works as a switch to activate proteins and regulate various cellular processes
- Howard Florey (1898–1968): Australian pharmacologist and pathologist; shared the Nobel Prize in Physiology or Medicine in 1945 with Sir Ernst Boris Chain and Sir Alexander Fleming for his role in the making of penicillin
- Lee de Forest (1863–1961): American inventor with over 180 patents to his credit; invented the Audion; considered to be one of the fathers of the "electronic age", as the Audion helped to usher in the widespread use of electronics; credited with one of the principal inventions that brought sound to motion pictures
- Edward Frankland (1825–1899): British chemist; expert in water quality and analysis; originated the concept of combining power, or valence, in chemistry
- Rosalind Franklin (1920–1958): British biophysicist and X-ray crystallographer; made critical contributions to the understanding of the fine molecular structures of DNA, RNA, viruses, coal and graphite
- Jerome I. Friedman (born 1930): American physicist; Institute Professor at the Massachusetts Institute of Technology; in 1968–1969 he conducted experiments with Henry W. Kendall and Richard E. Taylor at the Stanford Linear Accelerator Center which gave the first experimental evidence that protons had an internal structure, later known to be quarks; for this, they shared the 1990 Nobel Prize in Physics
- Milton Friedman (1912–2006): American economist, writer and public intellectual, winner of Nobel Prize in Economics
- William Froude (1810–1879): English engineer, hydrodynamicist and naval architect; first to formulate reliable laws for the resistance that water offers to ships (such as the hull speed equation) and for predicting their stability
- Dennis Gabor (1900–1979): Hungarian-British electrical engineer and inventor; known for his invention of holography and received the 1971 Nobel Prize in Physics
- Francis Galton (1822–1911): English Victorian polymath: anthropologist, eugenicist, tropical explorer, geographer, inventor, meteorologist, proto-geneticist, psychometrician, and statistician; a cousin of Charles Darwin
- Cecilia Payne-Gaposchkin (1900–1979): English-American astronomer who in 1925 was first to show that the Sun is mainly composed of hydrogen, contradicting accepted wisdom at the time
- Roy J. Glauber (1925–2018): American theoretical physicist; awarded one half of the 2005 Nobel Prize in Physics "for his contribution to the quantum theory of optical coherence", with the other half shared by John L. Hall and Theodor W. Hänsch
- Camillo Golgi (1843–1926): Italian physician, pathologist, scientist; along with Santiago Ramón y Cajal, he won the 1906 Nobel Prize in Physiology or Medicine for their studies of the structure of the nervous system
- David Gross (born 1941): American particle physicist and string theorist; with Frank Wilczek and David Politzer, he was awarded the 2004 Nobel Prize in Physics for their discovery of asymptotic freedom
- John Gurdon (born 1933): British developmental biologist; known for his pioneering research in nuclear transplantation and cloning
- Murray Gell-Mann (1929–2019): American physicist and linguist who received the 1969 Nobel Prize in Physics for his work on the theory of elementary particles
- Stephen Jay Gould (1941–2002): American paleontologist, Evolutionary biologist, science historian and popularizer; called himself a "Jewish agnostic"
- Alan Hale (born 1958): American astronomer, known for his co-discovery of the Comet Hale-Bopp.
- William Stewart Halsted (1852–1922): American surgeon who emphasized strict aseptic technique during surgical procedures, was an early champion of newly discovered anesthetics, and introduced several new operations, including the radical mastectomy for breast cancer.
- Theodor W. Hänsch (born 1941): German physicist. He received one fourth of the 2005 Nobel Prize in Physics for "contributions to the development of laser-based precision spectroscopy, including the optical frequency comb technique", sharing the prize with John L. Hall and Roy J. Glauber.
- Friedrich Hayek (1899–1992): Austrian economist and philosopher. Best known for his defense of classical liberalism and free-market capitalism. Along with Gunnar Myrdal, Hayek shared the Nobel Memorial Prize in Economic Sciences in 1974."
- Hermann von Helmholtz (1821–1894): German physician and physicist who made significant contributions to several widely varied areas of modern science. In physiology and psychology, he is known for his mathematics of the eye, theories of vision, ideas on the visual perception of space, color vision research, and on the sensation of tone, perception of sound, and empiricism. In physics, he is known for his theories on the conservation of energy, work in electrodynamics, chemical thermodynamics, and on a mechanical foundation of thermodynamics. As a philosopher, he is known for his philosophy of science, ideas on the relation between the laws of perception and the laws of nature, the science of aesthetics, and ideas on the civilizing power of science.
- Gerhard Herzberg (1904–1999): German pioneering physicist and physical chemist, who won the Nobel Prize for Chemistry in 1971.
- David Hilbert (1862–1943): German mathematician, recognized as one of the most influential and universal mathematicians of the 19th and early 20th centuries.
- Frederick Gowland Hopkins (1861–1947): English biochemist who was awarded the Nobel Prize in Physiology or Medicine in 1929, with Christiaan Eijkman, for the discovery of vitamins. He also discovered the amino acid tryptophan, in 1901. He was appointed President of the Royal Society from 1930 to 1935.
- Gerard 't Hooft (born 1946): Dutch theoretical physicist. He shared the 1999 Nobel Prize in Physics with his thesis advisor Martinus J. G. Veltman "for elucidating the quantum structure of electroweak interactions".
- Fred Hoyle (1915–2001): English astronomer and mathematician.
- Edwin Hubble (1889–1953): American astronomer who played a crucial role in establishing the field of extragalactic astronomy and is generally regarded as the leading observational cosmologist of the 20th century. Hubble generally is known for Hubble's law. He is credited with the discovery of the existence of galaxies other than the Milky Way and his galactic red shift discovery that the loss in frequency—the redshift — observed in the spectra of light from other galaxies increased in proportion to a particular galaxy's distance from Earth. This relationship became known as Hubble's law. His findings fundamentally changed the scientific view of the universe.
- Alexander von Humboldt (1769–1859): German naturalist and explorer. His quantitative work on botanical geography laid the foundation for the field of biogeography.
- Andrew Huxley (1917–2012): English physiologist and biophysicist. He (along with Alan Hodgkin) won the 1963 Nobel Prize in Physiology or Medicine for his experimental and mathematical work on the basis of nerve action potentials, the electrical impulses that enable the activity of an organism to be coordinated by a central nervous system.
- Thomas Henry Huxley (1825–1895): English biologist and coiner of the term agnosticism.
- Robert Jastrow (1925–2008): American astronomer, physicist and cosmologist.
- Edwin Thompson Jaynes (1922–1998): American physicist and statistician. He wrote extensively on statistical mechanics and on foundations of probability and statistical inference. He also pioneered the field of Digital physics.
- James Hopwood Jeans (1877–1946): English physicist, astronomer and mathematician.
- Jerome Karle (1918–2013): American physical chemist. Jointly with Herbert A. Hauptman, he was awarded the Nobel Prize in Chemistry in 1985, for the direct analysis of crystal structures using X-ray scattering techniques.
- August Kekulé (1829–1896): German organic chemist. He was one of the most prominent chemists in Europe, especially in theoretical chemistry. He was the principal founder of the theory of chemical structure.
- John Kendrew (1917–1997): English biochemist and crystallographer who shared the 1962 Nobel Prize in Chemistry with Max Perutz; their group in the Cavendish Laboratory investigated the structure of heme-containing proteins.
- John Maynard Keynes (1883–1946): British economist. His ideas are the basis for the school of thought known as Keynesian economics, as well as its various offshoots.
- Michio Kaku (born 1947): American theoretical physicist.
- Alfred Kastler (1902–1984): French physicist. He won the Nobel Prize in Physics in 1966.
- Joseph-Louis Lagrange (1736–1813): Italian-French mathematician and astronomer. He made significant contributions to all fields of analysis, number theory, and classical and celestial mechanics.
- Irving Langmuir (1881–1957): American chemist and physicist. He was awarded the 1932 Nobel Prize in Chemistry for his work in surface chemistry.
- Anthony James Leggett (1938–2026): English-American physicist. Professor Leggett is widely recognized as a world leader in the theory of low-temperature physics, and his pioneering work on superfluidity was recognized by the 2003 Nobel Prize in Physics.
- Joseph Leidy (1823–1891): American paleontologist.
- Mario Livio (born 1945): Israeli-American astrophysicist.
- Seth Lloyd (born 1960): American mechanical engineer. He is a professor of mechanical engineering at the Massachusetts Institute of Technology.
- James Lovelock (1919–2022): British scientist, environmentalist and futurologist. He is best known for proposing the Gaia hypothesis.
- Percival Lowell (1855–1916): American businessman, author, mathematician, and astronomer who fueled speculation that there were canals on Mars, founded the Lowell Observatory in Flagstaff, Arizona, and formed the beginning of the effort that led to the discovery of Pluto 14 years after his death.
- Frank Malina (1912–1981): American aeronautical engineer and painter, especially known for becoming both a pioneer in the art world and the realm of scientific engineering.
- Rudolph A. Marcus (1923–2026): Canadian-born chemist who received the 1992 Nobel Prize in Chemistry for his theory of electron transfer.
- Lynn Margulis (1938–2011): American biologist. She is best known for her theory on the origin of eukaryotic organelles, and her contributions to the endosymbiotic theory, which is now generally accepted for how certain organelles were formed. She is also associated with the Gaia hypothesis, based on an idea developed by the English environmental scientist James Lovelock.
- Dan McKenzie (geophysicist) (born 1942): British geophysicist.
- Simon van der Meer (1925–2011): Dutch particle accelerator physicist who shared the Nobel Prize in Physics in 1984 with Carlo Rubbia for contributions to the CERN project which led to the discovery of the W and Z particles, two of the most fundamental constituents of matter.
- Albert Abraham Michelson (1852–1931): American physicist known for his work on the measurement of the speed of light and especially for the Michelson–Morley experiment. In 1907 he received the Nobel Prize in Physics.
- Ludwig von Mises (1881–1973): Austrian Economist and Philosopher. He was a prominent figure in the Austrian School of economic thought.
- Ludwig Mond (1839–1909): German-born British chemist and industrialist.
- Robert S. Mulliken (1896–1986): American physicist and chemist, primarily responsible for the early development of molecular orbital theory, i. e. the elaboration of the molecular orbital method of computing the structure of molecules. Dr. Mulliken received the Nobel Prize for chemistry in 1966.
- Nathan Myhrvold (born 1959): American computer scientist, technologist, mathematician, physicist, entrepreneur, nature and wildlife photographer, master chef.
- David Nalin (born 1941): American physiologist. Nalin had the key insight that Oral rehydration therapy (ORT) would work if the volume of solution patients drank matched the volume of their fluid losses, and that this would drastically reduce or completely replace the only current treatment for cholera, intravenous therapy. Nalin's discoveries have been estimated to have saved over 50 million lives worldwide.
- Fridtjof Nansen (1861–1930): Norwegian explorer, scientist, diplomat, humanitarian and Nobel Peace Prize laureate. In 1922, he was awarded the Nobel Peace Prize for his work on behalf of the displaced victims of the First World War and related conflicts.
- Erwin Neher (born 1944): German biophysicist. Along with Bert Sakmann, he was awarded the Nobel Prize in Physiology or Medicine in 1991.
- Ronald George Wreyford Norrish (1897–1978): British chemist. As a result of the development of flash photolysis, he was awarded the Nobel Prize in Chemistry in 1967 along with Manfred Eigen and George Porter for their study of extremely fast chemical reactions.
- Robert Noyce (1927–1990): American physicist, businessman, and inventor. He co-founded Fairchild Semiconductor in 1957 and Intel Corporation in 1968. He is also credited (along with Jack Kilby) with the invention of the integrated circuit or microchip which fueled the personal computer revolution.
- Sherwin B. Nuland (1930–2014): American surgeon and author of How We Die.
- Paul Nurse (born 1949): 2001 Nobel Laureate in Physiology or Medicine, called himself an atheist, but specified that "sceptical agnostic" was a more "philosophically correct" term.
- Bill Nye (born 1955): American science educator, comedian, television host, actor, mechanical engineer and scientist. Popularly known as "Bill Nye the Science Guy".
- George Olah (1927–2017): 1994 Nobel Laureate in Chemistry, discoverer of superacids,
- Mark Oliphant (1901–2000): Australian physicist and humanitarian. He played a fundamental role in the first experimental demonstration of nuclear fusion and also the development of the atomic bomb.
- Karl Pearson (1857–1936): English mathematician who has been credited for establishing the discipline of mathematical statistics.
- Saul Perlmutter (born 1959): American astrophysicist. He shared both the 2006 Shaw Prize in Astronomy and the 2011 Nobel Prize in Physics with Brian P. Schmidt and Adam Riess for providing evidence that the expansion of the universe is accelerating.
- Henri Poincaré (1854–1912): French mathematician, theoretical physicist, engineer, and a philosopher of science. He is often described as a polymath, and in mathematics as The Last Universalist, since he excelled in all fields of the discipline as it existed during his lifetime.
- Siméon Denis Poisson (1781–1840): French mathematician, geometer, and physicist.
- George Pólya (1888–1985): Hungarian Jewish mathematician. He was a professor of mathematics from 1914 to 1940 at ETH Zürich and from 1940 to 1953 at Stanford University. He made fundamental contributions to combinatorics, number theory, numerical analysis and probability theory. He is also noted for his work in heuristics and mathematics education.
- Carolyn Porco (born 1953): American planetary scientist. She is best known for her work in the exploration of the outer Solar System, beginning with her imaging work on the Voyager missions to Jupiter, Saturn, Uranus and Neptune in the 1980s.
- Vladimir Prelog (1906–1998): Croatian organic chemist. He won the Nobel Prize in Chemistry in 1975.
- Vilayanur S. Ramachandran (born 1951): Indian-American neuroscientist. Best known for his work in the fields of behavioral neurology and visual psychophysics.
- C. V. Raman (1888–1970): Indian physicist whose work was influential in the growth of science in India. He was the recipient of the Nobel Prize for Physics in 1930 for the discovery that when light traverses a transparent material, some of the light that is deflected changes in wavelength. This phenomenon is now called Raman scattering and is the result of the Raman effect.
- Lisa Randall (born 1962): American theoretical physicist and a student of particle physics and cosmology. She works on several of the competing models of string theory in the quest to explain the fabric of the universe. Her best known contribution to the field is the Randall–Sundrum model, first published in 1999 with Raman Sundrum.
- John Strutt, 3rd Baron Rayleigh (1842–1919): English physicist who, with William Ramsay, discovered the element argon, an achievement for which he earned the Nobel Prize for Physics in 1904. He also discovered the phenomenon now called Rayleigh scattering, explaining why the sky is blue, and predicted the existence of the surface waves now known as Rayleigh waves. Rayleigh's textbook, The Theory of Sound, is still referred to by acoustic engineers today.
- Grote Reber (1911–2002): American amateur astronomer and pioneer of radio astronomy. He was instrumental in investigating and extending Karl Jansky's pioneering work, and conducted the first sky survey in the radio frequencies. His 1937 radio antenna was the second ever to be used for astronomical purposes and the first parabolic reflecting antenna to be used as a "radio telescope".
- Robert Coleman Richardson (1937–2013): American experimental physicist. He, along with David Lee, as senior researchers, and then graduate student Douglas Osheroff, shared the 1996 Nobel Prize in Physics for their 1972 discovery of the property of superfluidity in helium-3 atoms in the Cornell University Laboratory of Atomic and Solid State Physics.
- Charles Richet (1850–1935): French physiologist, won the 1913 Nobel Prize in Physiology or Medicine for his work on anaphylaxis.
- Isaac Roberts (1829–1904): Welsh engineer and business man best known for his work as an amateur astronomer, pioneering the field of astrophotography of nebulae.
- Richard J. Roberts (born 1943): British biochemist and molecular biologist. He was awarded the 1993 Nobel Prize in Physiology or Medicine with Phillip Allen Sharp for the discovery of introns in eukaryotic DNA and the mechanism of gene-splicing.
- Józef Rotblat (1908–2005): Polish-British physicist. Along with the Pugwash Conferences on Science and World Affairs, he received the Nobel Peace Prize in 1995.
- Carl Sagan (1934–1996): Astronomer and skeptic.
- Frederick Sanger (1918–2013): English biochemist and a two-time Nobel Laureate in Chemistry.
- Nicholas Saunderson (1682–1739): English scientist and mathematician.
- Peter Schuster (born 1941): Professor of Theoretical Chemistry at the University of Vienna.
- Harlow Shapley (1885–1972): American astronomer. Best known for determining the correct position of the Sun within the Milky Way galaxy.
- Charles Scott Sherrington (1857–1952): English neurophysiologist, histologist, bacteriologist, and pathologist. He, along with Edgar Adrian, won the 1932 Nobel Prize in Physiology or Medicine.
- George Gaylord Simpson (1902–1984): American paleontologist. He is considered to be one of the most influential paleontologist of the 20th century, and a major participant in the modern evolutionary synthesis.
- Jens C. Skou (1918–2018): Danish chemist. In 1997 he received the Nobel Prize in Chemistry (together with Paul D. Boyer and John E. Walker) for his discovery of Na^{+}, K^{+}-ATPase.
- Homer Smith (1895–1962): American physiologist. His research work focused on the kidney and he discovered inulin at the same time as A.N. Richards.
- William Smith (geologist) (1769–1839): English geologist, credited with creating the first nationwide geological map. He is known as the "Father of English Geology" for collating the geological history of England and Wales into a single record, although recognition was very slow in coming.
- George Smoot (1945–2025): American astrophysicist, cosmologist, Nobel laureate, and $1 million TV quiz show prize winner (Are You Smarter Than a 5th Grader?). He won the Nobel Prize in Physics in 2006 for his work on the Cosmic Background Explorer with John C. Mather that led to the measurement "of the black body form and anisotropy of the cosmic microwave background radiation."
- Charles Proteus Steinmetz (1865–1923): German-American mathematician and electrical engineer.
- Piero Sraffa (1898–1983): Influential Italian economist whose book Production of Commodities by Means of Commodities is taken as founding the Neo-Ricardian school of Economics.
- Albert Szent-Györgyi (1893–1986): Hungarian physiologist who won the Nobel Prize in Physiology or Medicine in 1937. He is credited with discovering vitamin C and the components and reactions of the citric acid cycle.
- Leo Szilard (1898–1964): Austro-Hungarian physicist and inventor.
- Igor Tamm (1895–1971): Soviet physicist who received the 1958 Nobel Prize in Physics, jointly with Pavel Alekseyevich Cherenkov and Ilya Frank, for their 1934 discovery of Cherenkov radiation.
- Edward Teller (1908–2003): Hungarian-American theoretical physicist, known colloquially as "the father of the hydrogen bomb". Teller made numerous contributions to nuclear and molecular physics, spectroscopy (the Jahn–Teller and Renner–Teller effects), and surface physics.
- Thorvald N. Thiele (1838–1910): Danish astronomer, actuary and mathematician, most notable for his work in statistics, interpolation and the three-body problem. He was the first to propose a mathematical theory of Brownian motion. Thiele introduced the cumulants and (in Danish) the likelihood function; these contributions were not credited to Thiele by Ronald A. Fisher, who nevertheless named Thiele to his (short) list of the greatest statisticians of all time on the strength of Thiele's other contributions.
- E. Donnall Thomas (1920–2012): American physician, professor emeritus at the University of Washington, and director emeritus of the clinical research division at the Fred Hutchinson Cancer Research Center. In 1990 he shared the Nobel Prize in Physiology or Medicine with Joseph E. Murray for the development of cell and organ transplantation. Thomas developed bone marrow transplantation as a treatment for leukemia.
- John Tyndall (1820–1893): Prominent 19th century experimental physicist. Known for producing a number of discoveries about processes in the atmosphere.
- Neil deGrasse Tyson (born 1958): American astrophysicist, science communicator, the Frederick P. Rose Director of the Hayden Planetarium at the Rose Center for Earth and Space, and a Research Associate in the Department of Astrophysics at the American Museum of Natural History.
- Stanislaw Ulam (1909–1984): Polish-Jewish mathematician. He participated in America's Manhattan Project, originated the Teller–Ulam design of thermonuclear weapons, invented the Monte Carlo method of computation, and suggested nuclear pulse propulsion.
- Martinus J. G. Veltman (1931–2021): Dutch theoretical physicist. He shared the 1999 Nobel Prize in Physics with his former student Gerardus 't Hooft for their work on particle theory.
- Rudolf Virchow (1821–1902): German doctor, anthropologist, pathologist, prehistorian, biologist and politician. Referred to as "the father of modern pathology", he is considered one of the founders of social medicine.
- John von Neumann (1903–1957): Hungarian-American mathematician and polymath who made major contributions to a vast number of fields, including set theory, functional analysis, quantum mechanics, ergodic theory, geometry, fluid dynamics, economics, linear programming, game theory, computer science, numerical analysis, hydrodynamics, and statistics, as well as many other mathematical fields. It is indicated that he was an "agnostic Catholic" due to his agreement with Pascal's Wager.
- Alfred Russel Wallace (1823–1913): British naturalist, explorer, geographer, anthropologist and biologist. He is best known for independently proposing a theory of evolution due to natural selection that prompted Charles Darwin to publish his own theory.
- André Weil (1906–1998): French mathematician. He is especially known for his foundational work in number theory and algebraic geometry.
- Walter Frank Raphael Weldon (1860–1906): English evolutionary biologist and a founder of biometry. He was the joint founding editor of Biometrika, with Francis Galton and Karl Pearson.
- Norbert Wiener (1894–1964): American mathematician and child prodigy. He is regarded as the originator of cybernetics.
- Eugene Wigner (1902–1995): Hungarian American theoretical physicist and mathematician. He received a share of the Nobel Prize in Physics in 1963 "for his contributions to the theory of the atomic nucleus and the elementary particles, particularly through the discovery and application of fundamental symmetry principles"; the other half of the award was shared between Maria Goeppert-Mayer and J. Hans D. Jensen. Wigner is important for having laid the foundation for the theory of symmetries in quantum mechanics as well as for his research into the structure of the atomic nucleus. It was Eugene Wigner who first identified Xe-135 "poisoning" in nuclear reactors, and for this reason it is sometimes referred to as Wigner poisoning. Wigner is also important for his work in pure mathematics, having authored a number of theorems.
- Frank Wilczek (born 1951): American theoretical physicist. Along with David J. Gross and Hugh David Politzer, won the Nobel Prize in Physics in 2004.
- Steve Wozniak (born 1950): Co-founder of Apple Computer and inventor of the Apple I and Apple II.
- Chen Ning Yang (1922–2025): Chinese-born American physicist who works on statistical mechanics and particle physics. He and Tsung-dao Lee received the 1957 Nobel Prize in Physics for their work on parity nonconservation of weak interaction.
- Hubert Yockey (1916–2016): American physicist and information theorist.
- Hans Zinsser (1878–1940): American bacteriologist and a prolific author. He is known for his work in isolating the typhus bacterium and developing a protective vaccine.

=== Celebrities and athletes ===
- Steve Austin (born 1964): American professional wrestler.
- Kristy Hawkins (born 1980): American IFBB professional bodybuilder and scientist.
- Edmund Hillary (1919–2008): New Zealand mountaineer, explorer and philanthropist. He along with Tenzing Norgay became the first climbers confirmed as having reached the summit of Mount Everest.
- Pat Tillman (1976–2004): American professional football player and U.S. Army veteran.
- Rafael Nadal (born 1986): Spanish professional tennis player.
- Rob Van Dam (born 1970): American professional wrestler, winner of three separate major promotion world championships.
- Mike Mentzer (1951–2001): American IFBB Professional bodybuilder, businessman, philosopher and author.

== See also ==
- Lists of atheists
- List of secular humanists
- Lists of lists of people by belief
