= James Hall =

James Hall may refer to:

== Entertainment ==
- James Norman Hall (1887–1951), American novelist
- James Hall (actor) (1900–1940), American actor
- James Baker Hall (1935–2009), American poet and professor
- James W. Hall (born 1947), American novelist in Florida
- James A. Hall (born 1947), music professor at the University of South Carolina
- James Hall (singer) (born 1968), American rock singer and guitarist
- James Hall (gospel musician) (born 1971), American gospel musician
- James Hall (pianist), American jazz musician

== Politics ==
- Sir James Hall, 4th Baronet (1761–1832), Scottish politician and geologist
- James Hall (governor) (1802–1889), founder of Maryland-in-Africa
- James Hall (Canadian politician) (1806–1882), Canadian Member of Parliament
- J. H. Hall (1877–1942), British MP for Whitechapel and St Georges
- James Knox Polk Hall (1844–1915), American politician

== Sports ==
=== Cricket ===
- James Hall (Cambridgeshire cricketer) (fl. 1820s–1830s), English first-class cricketer
- Jamie Hall (born 1968), English cricketer
- James Hall (Irish cricketer) (born 1988), English-born Irish cricketer

=== Rugby ===
- James Hall (rugby league) (1922–2011), Australian rugby player
- James Hall (rugby union, born 1986), English rugby union player
- James Hall (rugby union, born 1996), South African rugby union player

=== Other sports ===
- James Hall (athlete) (1903–1929), Indian sprinter
- James M. Hall (active 1936–37), Scottish footballer
- James Hall (defensive end) (born 1977), American football defensive end
- James Hall (linebacker) (born 1963)
- James Hall (sport shooter) (born 1983), American sport shooter
- James Hall (footballer) (born 1989), Filipino-Scottish footballer
- James Hall (gymnast) (born 1995), English gymnast
- Blainey Hall (James Blaine Hall, 1889–1975), American baseball player
- Seaman Nobby Hall (James Hall, 1892–1953), British boxer

== Science and academia ==
- Sir James Hall, 4th Baronet (1761–1832), Scottish geologist and politician
- James Hall (paleontologist) (1811–1898), American geologist and paleontologist
- James Hall (historian) (1846–1914), English historian and antiquarian
- James O. Hall (1912–2007), amateur historian and Abraham Lincoln scholar
- James Hall (philosopher) (born 1933), American philosophy professor at University of Richmond

== Other ==
- James Hall (architect), of Evans, Bruer, & Hall, designers of the Piccadilly Cinema in Adelaide, Australia
- James Hall (explorer) (died 1612), English explorer
- James Hall (minister) (1744–1826), American Presbyterian minister
- James Hall (writer) (1793–1868), American judge and editor
- James Goodwin Hall (1896–1952), American business executive
- James Hall III (born 1958), American soldier and East-bloc spy
- James Hatton Hall (1866–1945), English planter and soldier
- James Randal Hall (born 1958), U.S. federal judge
- James R. Hall (born 1936), United States Army officer
- James Waybern Hall, American serial killer

== See also ==
- Jim Hall (disambiguation)
- Stuart Hall (presenter) (born 1929), English former media personality
