= Jim Hall =

Jim Hall may refer to:

== Sports ==
- Jim Hall (baseball) (died 1886), professional baseball player from 1872 to 1875
- Jim Hall (boxer) (1868–1913), Australian boxer in the late 19th century
- Jim Hall (footballer, born 1914) (1914–?), English footballer who played for Blackpool
- Jim Hall (footballer, born 1945), English footballer who made 450 Football League appearances
- Jim Hall (Australian footballer) (1919–2006), Australian rules footballer for St Kilda
- Jim Hall (announcer) (1933-2017), for the New York Giants
- Jim Hall (racing driver) (born 1935), founder of Chaparral Cars

== Other ==
- Jim Hall (civil engineer) (born 1968), British professor of civil and environmental engineering
- Jim Hall (musician) (1930–2013), American jazz guitarist
- Jim Hall (computer programmer), began the FreeDOS project
- Jim Hall (body artist), Baltimore native known for his whole-body tattoo

== See also ==
- James Hall (disambiguation)
