= Anne Windfohr Marion =

American philanthropist (1938–2020)

- Born: Anne Valliant Burnett Hall; November 10, 1938; Fort Worth, Texas, U.S.
- Died: February 11, 2020 (aged 81)
- Education: Hockaday School; Miss Porter's School; Briarcliff Junior College
- Occupations: Rancher, horsebreeder, business executive, philanthropist, art collector
- Political party: Republican
- Spouse: 4, including John L. Marion
- Children: Anne "Windi" Phillips Grimes
- Parent(s): James Goodwin Hall; Anne Valliant Burnett Tandy
- Relatives: Robert Windfohr (stepfather and adoptive father); Charles D. Tandy (stepfather); Samuel Burk Burnett (maternal great-grandfather); Thomas Lloyd Burnett (maternal grandfather)

Anne Windfohr Marion (born Anne Valliant Burnett Hall; November 10, 1938 – February 11, 2020) was an American heiress, rancher, horse breeder, business executive, philanthropist, and art collector from Fort Worth, Texas. She served as the president of Burnett Ranches and the chairman of the Burnett Oil Company. She was the founder of the Georgia O'Keeffe Museum in Santa Fe, New Mexico. In 1981, she was inducted into the Hall of Great Westerners of the National Cowboy & Western Heritage Museum.

== Early life ==
Anne Valliant Burnett Hall was born and grew up in Fort Worth, Texas. Her father, James Goodwin Hall, was a stockbroker. Her mother, Anne, was a rancher, horsebreeder, businesswoman and philanthropist. After her parents' divorce, she was adopted by her mother's third husband, Robert Windfohr, and took his surname. When her mother remarried for the fourth time, her stepfather became Charles D. Tandy, the founder of the Tandy Corporation. Her maternal great-grandfather, Captain Samuel Burk Burnett, was a rancher.

Known as 'Little Anne' informally, she was educated at the Hockaday School in Dallas and Miss Porter's School in Farmington, Connecticut. She graduated from Briarcliff Junior College in Briarcliff Manor, New York. She then attended the University of Texas at Austin in Austin, Texas and the University of Geneva in Switzerland, where she studied art history. She was presented as a debutante at The Assembly in Fort Worth. She was elected as Duchess of Texas at the Texas Rose Festival in 1957 and Duchess of Fort Worth to the Court of Courts by the Order of the Alamo in 1959.

== Career ==
She inherited four ranches spanning 275,000 acres in West Texas, and served as the president of the entity known as Burnett Ranches. It includes the historic 6666 Ranch. She purchased Dash For Cash, Special Effort and Streakin Six, all award-winning horses. She also kept 160 broodmares. She was inducted into the American Quarter Horse Hall of Fame in 2007.

In 1980, she established the Burnett Oil Company, headquartered at the Burnett Plaza in Fort Worth, Texas. The company operates in several states. It is a member of the Fort Worth Chamber of Commerce, and she served as its chairman of the board.

In 1983 she was worth $150 million, and in 1989 this had risen to $400 million. In 2006, she was worth US$1.3 billion. She was on the Forbes 400 list until 2009, when she was worth US$1.1 billion.

== Philanthropy ==
Marion served as president and trustee of the Anne Burnett and Charles D. Tandy Foundation. It later became known as the Burnett Foundation. With a gift of $10 million from the foundation, she founded the Georgia O'Keeffe Museum in Santa Fe, New Mexico. In 2013, she donated the main donation for a $57 million new emergency center at the Texas Health Harris Methodist Hospital in Fort Worth. It is named the Marion Emergency Care Center.

She served on the boards of trustees of the Museum of Modern Art in New York City, as well as the Kimbell Art Museum and the Modern Art Museum of Fort Worth. She helped move the National Cowgirl Museum and Hall of Fame from Hereford, Texas to Fort Worth. She selected members of the board of trustees alongside business executive Ed Bass. She was inducted into its Hall of Fame in 2005.

She served as a member of the Board of Regents of the Texas Tech University System from 1981 to 1986. She endowed a professorship at the Ranching Management School of Texas Christian University (TCU) in Fort Worth. She also paid for the renovation and new elevator of the chancellor's box of the Amon G. Carter Stadium at TCU, where the chancellor conducts fundraising events for the university. She was the recipient of the Charles Goodnight Award from TCU. In 2001, she received the National Golden Spur Award from the National Ranching Heritage Center at Texas Tech University in Lubbock, Texas.

In 2012, she was a donor to Mitt Romney's presidential campaign.

== Personal life ==
Marion was divorced three times. In 1961, she was married to William Wade Meeker, the son of Mrs. and Mr. Julian R. Meeker. They had one daughter, Anne Windfohr Meeker.

Her second husband was Benjamin Franklin (B. F.) Phillips, a horseman; they owned several successful racehorses including Dash For Cash and Streakin Six. They married in 1969 and divorced in 1980. They raised one daughter, Anne "Windi" Phillips Grimes (born 1964), who married David M. Grimes II.

Her third husband was James Rowland Sowell. They married in 1982 and divorced in 1987.

She married her fourth husband, John L. Marion, at the Church of the Heavenly Rest on the Upper East Side of Manhattan, New York City, in 1988. The ceremony was performed by Reverend C. Hugh Hildesley.

She lived in the Westover Hills neighborhood of Fort Worth, Texas, in a 19,000-square-foot modernist home on Shady Oaks Lane, designed for her mother by I. M. Pei in the 1960s. She owned secondary residences in Santa Fe, New Mexico, Indian Wells, California, Jackson Hole, Wyoming, and an apartment at 820 Fifth Avenue, New York. She enjoyed quail hunting on her Four Sixes Ranch.

She died on February 11, 2020, aged 81.
