= Anne Burnett Tandy =

American heiress, rancher, horsebreeder, philanthropist and art collector

- Born: Anne Valliant Burnett; October 15, 1900; Fort Worth, Texas, U.S.
- Died: January 1, 1980 (aged 79); Fort Worth, Texas, U.S.
- Resting place: Oakwood Cemetery, Fort Worth, Texas
- Occupations: Rancher, horse breeder, philanthropist, art collector
- Spouse(s): Guy Waggoner (divorced); James Goodwin Hall (divorced); Robert Windfohr (deceased); Charles Tandy
- Children: Anne Burnett
- Parent(s): Thomas Lloyd Burnett; Olive (Lake) Burnett

Anne Valliant Burnett Tandy (née Burnett, formerly Waggoner, formerly Hall, formerly Windfohr; October 15, 1900 – January 1, 1980) was an American heiress, rancher, horse breeder, philanthropist and art collector from Fort Worth, Texas.

== Early life ==
Anne Valliant Burnett was born on October 15, 1900, in Fort Worth, Texas. She grew up in Fort Worth. Her father, Thomas Lloyd Burnett was the owner of the Triangle Ranch and operated the Tom L. Burnett Cattle Company. Her mother was Olive (Lake) Burnett. Her parents divorced in 1918, when she was eighteen years old.

Her paternal grandfather, Samuel Burk Burnett, established the 6666 Ranch near Guthrie, Texas, after the Civil War. Her paternal step-grandmother was Mary Couts Burnett, a philanthropist whose estate went to Texas Christian University in Fort Worth.

"Miss Anne", as she was known informally, was educated on the East coast and summered at her father's Triangle Ranch, where she learned ranching as a teenager.

== Career ==
In 1922, aged just 21, she inherited the 6666 Ranch from her grandfather, who had willed it to her in a trust prior to his death, bypassing his wife, Mary Couts Burnett, whom he tried to disinherit after he had her committed. Her grandfather left her $6 million in cash but after Mary Couts Burnett challenged the will, the court gave them each $3 million in cash but Anne also kept the ranch and oil interests. Upon her father's death in 1938, she also inherited his estate, including the Triangle Ranch and more oil interests, and her wealth increased considerably. His estate was worth more than $3 million.

She became a renowned breeder of American Quarter Horses. She purchased Grey Badger I in 1949 and kept Streakin Six, Dash For Cash, and Special Effort at her 6666 Ranch.

She served on the board of directors of the First National Bank of Fort Worth, the Southwestern Exposition and Fat Stock Show, and was on the board of trustees of Texas Christian University. She was the first woman to serve as a member of the Fort Worth Chamber of Commerce and the West Texas Chamber of Commerce.

== Philanthropy ==
She co-founded the American Quarter Horse Association, where she served as Honorary Vice President. Additionally, she founded the American Quarter Horse Heritage Center and Museum. She also served on the boards of trustees of the Amon Carter Museum in Fort Worth, the Museum of Modern Art in New York, the National Cowboy Hall of Fame in Oklahoma City, Oklahoma, and the Ranching Heritage Association in Lubbock, Texas. She also served as Vice President of the Texas and Southwestern Cattle Raisers Association. She was an avid art collector and amassed a premier collection of artworks by Picasso, Gauguin, Matisse, Klee, Modigliani, Nolde, Manzu, Miro, and Leger.

After her fourth husband's death in 1978, she founded the eponymous Anne Burnett Tandy and Charles D. Tandy Foundation. The foundation donated to non-profit organizations in the Fort Worth area.

She received the Golden Deeds Award from the Exchange Club of Fort Worth in 1975.

== Personal life ==
She first married Guy Waggoner, an heir to the Waggoner Ranch, in 1922 and divorced in 1928. They lived at the Waggoner Ranch and when in Fort Worth they lived with her mother Ollie at her palatial home at 4910 Crestline Road. Waggoner was not a faithful husband; one day she drove away, smashing through all the gates instead of opening them, and left the car running at the train station. Her second marriage was to James Goodwin Hall in 1932. They married in New York City at Fifth Avenue Presbyterian Church. They had a daughter, Anne Valliant Burnett Hall (born 1938). They resided in a hilltop home on Spanish Trail in Westover Hills in Fort Worth, designed by John F. Staub. The estate underwent significant renovations in the early 1950s, with a pool and modern entertaining pavilion and games room designed and decorated by William Haines and Melanie Kahane. It was featured in the August 1956 issue of House & Garden magazine. After they divorced, she married Robert Frairy Windfohr in 1942, who died in 1964. Her mother Ollie Lake Burnett died in 1966.

In 1944, she purchased the President Vargas Diamond ring from Harry Winston for $420,000. The 48-carat emerald-cut ring was so heavy she couldn't lift her hand while wearing it. It was sold back to Winston in 1958.

In 1949, they commissioned architect Frank Lloyd Wright to design a new house on a site in Westover Hills. Named 'Crownfield', the modernist design included a single level of circular-shaped and domed structures with a gold ceiling in the living room. Wright's unwillingness to include air-conditioning was one reason why the plans never came to fruition.

In 1969, she married Charles Tandy, the founder of the Tandy Corporation.

In the early 1960s, she commissioned Chinese-American architect I.M. Pei to design a new house in their site in Westover Hills, the site of the dumped Crownfield project. Pei's dramatic 19,000 square-foot concrete and marble structure – which took two years to design and three years to build – was completed in 1969 and set a new standard in Dallas–Fort Worth for vanguard residential design, and became a local tourist attraction. It featured concrete walls bush-hammered to expose a quartz and pink feldspar aggregate. A raked skylighted shed-roof rising over a marble-floor entertainment area with bar gave the home its profile-identity. It was featured in the November 1970 issue of House & Garden magazine. It was the first house Pei designed. Charles Tandy died in 1978.

== Death and legacy ==
She died of cancer on January 1, 1980, at her Fort Worth home. She was buried at Greenwood Memorial Park in Fort Worth. Her estate was inherited by her only daughter. Prior to her death, she was in talks with celebrated Mexican architect Luis Barragan about designing a new ranch house. Meanwhile, she was inducted into the American Quarter Horse Association posthumously in 1990, and into the National Cowgirl Museum and Hall of Fame in 2002. In 1994, she was inducted into the Hall of Great Westerners of the National Cowboy & Western Heritage Museum.

== See also ==
- Burnett Park, Fort Worth, Texas
