= Burnett Park =

Park in Fort Worth, Texas

Coordinates: 32°45′01″N 97°20′01″W

Burnett Park, Fort Worth, Texas

Burnett Park in Fort Worth, Texas is a park designed around twenty four squares.

== Original design and renovation ==
The park was originally laid out by George E. Kessler. It was designed in 1984 for Anne Burnett, in honor of her mother and her grandfather. The Tandy Foundation sponsored the rehabilitation of this urban park to encourage the continuing revitalization of downtown Fort Worth.

Together with the nearby sculpture garden plaza designed by Isamu Noguchi, Burnett Park now forms an important gateway to the city from the west. The park has been renovated and updated several times over the decades.

== See also ==
- Anne Windfohr Marion#Philanthropy
- Botanical Research Institute of Texas
- Fort Worth Botanic Garden
- Noguchi Museum
