= Thomas Lloyd Burnett =

American rancher (1871–1938)

- Born: 1871; Denton County, Texas, U.S.
- Died: December 26, 1938 (aged 66–67)]
- Resting place: Highland Cemetery, Iowa Park, Texas
- Education: Virginia Military Institute
- Occupation: Rancher
- Spouse(s): Olive (Lake) Burnett (divorced); Lucille Mulhall (divorced); Lydia Sheldon (divorced); Bernice Fassett
- Children: Anne Burnett
- Parent(s): Samuel Burk Burnett; Ruth (Lloyd) Burnett
- Relatives: Anne Windfohr Marion (granddaughter)

Thomas Lloyd Burnett (1871 – 1938) was an American rancher from Texas. He owned 449,415 acres (181,872 ha; 1,818.72 km^{2}) of land.

== Early life ==
Thomas Lloyd Burnett was born in 1871 in Denton County, Texas. His father, Samuel Burk Burnett, was the owner of the 6666 Ranch. His mother was Ruth (Lloyd) Burnett. He moved to Wichita County, Texas with his parents in 1875, when he was four years old.

Burnett was educated at a private academy in St. Louis, Missouri and the Virginia Military Institute.

== Career ==
Burnett worked as a cowhand and later wagon boss at the Big Pasture in southwestern Oklahoma. Meanwhile, he learned to speak the Comanche language and became friends in Chief Quanah Parker. He then served as a captain during the Spanish–American War of 1898.

In 1912, Burnett inherited ranching interests in Wichita County, Texas from his later maternal grandfather, Martin B. Lloyd. He established the Triangle Ranch, where he raised cattle and drilled newfound oil. A decade later, from 1923 to 1925, he acquired the Pope Ranch and the McAdams Ranch in Foard County, Texas as well as the Moon Ranch formerly owned by W. Q. Richards, in Cottle County, Texas. A few years later, in 1929, he purchased the YL Ranch (formerly part of the OX Ranch) in the Paducah area. A decade later, in 1938, he purchased the 7L Ranch. Overall, he owned 449,415 acres (181,872 ha; 1,818.72 km^{2}) of land and 4,000 to 6,000 head of Hereford stock.

Burnett was a major shareholder of the Iowa Park State Bank. He patronized rodeos in Wichita Falls, Texas. During the Great Depression in the 1930s, he donated school lunches to schoolchildren in Wichita Falls and assisted impoverished cowboys.

== Personal life, death, and legacy ==
Burnett married Olive Lake Burnett. They had a daughter, Anne Valliant Burnett Tandy. The couple divorced in 1918. His second marriage was to Lucille Mulhall, a rodeo queen. The wedding took place on May 3, 1919, and they divorced in 1920. His third marriage was to Lydia Sheldon of Electra; they wed in 1921 and got divorced shortly after. His fourth marriage was to Bernice Fassett, a widow from a ranching family.

Burnett died of a heart attack on December 26, 1938. He was buried at Highland Cemetery in Iowa Park, Texas. His estate was inherited by his only daughter. His granddaughter, Anne Windfohr Marion, was the owner of his father's 6666 Ranch, his Triangle Ranch, and the Burnett Oil Company until her death in 2020. In 1981, she donated his private residence to the City of Iowa Park, where it became a public library. In 1978, he was inducted into the Hall of Great Westerners of the National Cowboy & Western Heritage Museum.
