= Peter H. Hassrick =

American museum curator (1941–2019)

- Born: April 27, 1941; Philadelphia, Pennsylvania, U.S.
- Died: October 25, 2019 (aged 78); Cody, Wyoming, U.S.
- Education: Steamboat Mountain School; University of Colorado Boulder; University of Denver
- Occupation(s): Museum curator, art historian
- Spouse: Elizabeth Drake
- Children: 2 sons

Peter Heyl Hassrick (April 27, 1941 – October 25, 2019) was an American museum curator, art historian, and the author or editor of many exhibition catalogues about Western American art.

== Early life ==
Hassrick was born on April 27, 1941, in Philadelphia, Pennsylvania, US. He graduated from the Steamboat Mountain School, the University of Colorado Boulder, where he earned a bachelor's degree in History, and the University of Denver, where he earned a master's degree in art history.

== Career ==
Hassrick was the curator of the Amon Carter Museum of American Art in Fort Worth, Texas, and the Buffalo Bill Center of the West in Cody, Wyoming, the founding director of the Georgia O'Keeffe Museum in Santa Fe, New Mexico, and the Charles Russell Center for the Study of Western American Art at the University of Oklahoma in Norman, Oklahoma, and the founder of the Petrie Institute of American Western Art at the Denver Art Museum. He authored and edited many exhibitions catalogues about the art of the Western United States.

Hassrick served on the board of directors of the Cody Regional Health Foundation, the Wyoming Arts Council and the Wyoming Humanities Council. He received an honorary PhD from the University of Wyoming. For the Cody Enterprise, Hassrick was "a titan of Western American art."

== Personal life and death ==
Hassrick married Elizabeth Drake, also known as Buzzy, and they had two sons. He died of cancer on October 25, 2019, in Cody, Wyoming.

== Selected works ==
- Hassrick, Peter H. (1973). Frederic Remington: Paintings, Drawings and Sculpture in the Amon Carter Museum and the Sid W. Richardson Foundation Collections. New York: Abrams. OCLC 265252273.
- Hassrick, Peter H. (1982). 100 Years of Western Art from Pittsburgh Collections. Pittsburgh, Pennsylvania: Museum of Art, Carnegie Institute. ISBN 9780880390026. OCLC 8133390.
- Hassrick, Peter H. (1983). The Way West: Art of Frontier America. New York: Harry N. Abrams. ISBN 9780810980532. OCLC 9576101.
- Hassrick, Peter H., ed. (1997). The Georgia O'Keeffe Museum. New York: Harry N. Abrams. ISBN 9780810936850. OCLC 807862655.
- Hassrick, Peter H. (2000). The American West: Out of Myth, Into Reality. Washington, D.C.: Trust for Museum Exhibitions in association with the Mississippi Museum of Art. ISBN 9781882507085. OCLC 44105310.
- Hassrick, Peter H. (2009). A Century of Sanctuary: The Art of Zion National Park. Springdale, Utah: Zion Natural History Association. ISBN 9780915630486. OCLC 230915955.
- Hassrick, Peter H. (2015). Drawn to Yellowstone: Artists in America's First National Park. Cody, Wyoming: Buffalo Bill Center of the West. ISBN 9780989640541. OCLC 949913884.
- Hassrick, Peter H. (2017). The Best of Proctor's West: An In-depth Study of Eleven of Proctor's Bronzes. Cody, Wyoming: Buffalo Bill Center of the West. ISBN 9780931618710. OCLC 973159788.
