= Georgia O'Keeffe Museum =

Art museum and historic property in New Mexico, U.S.

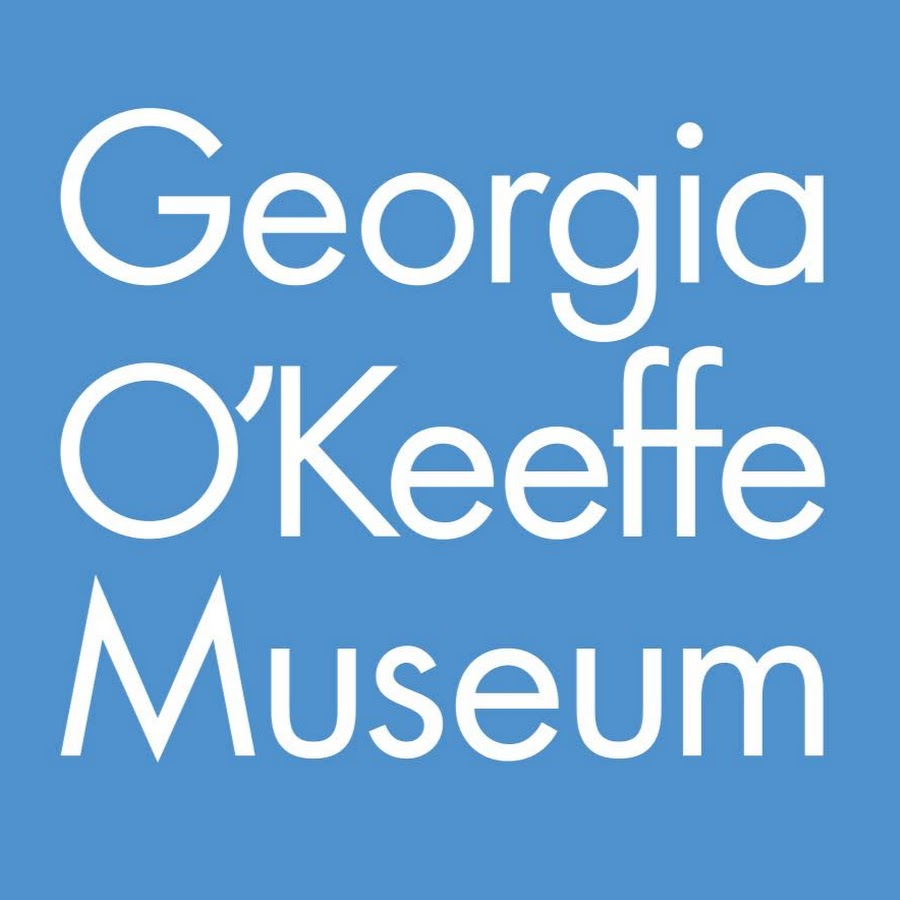

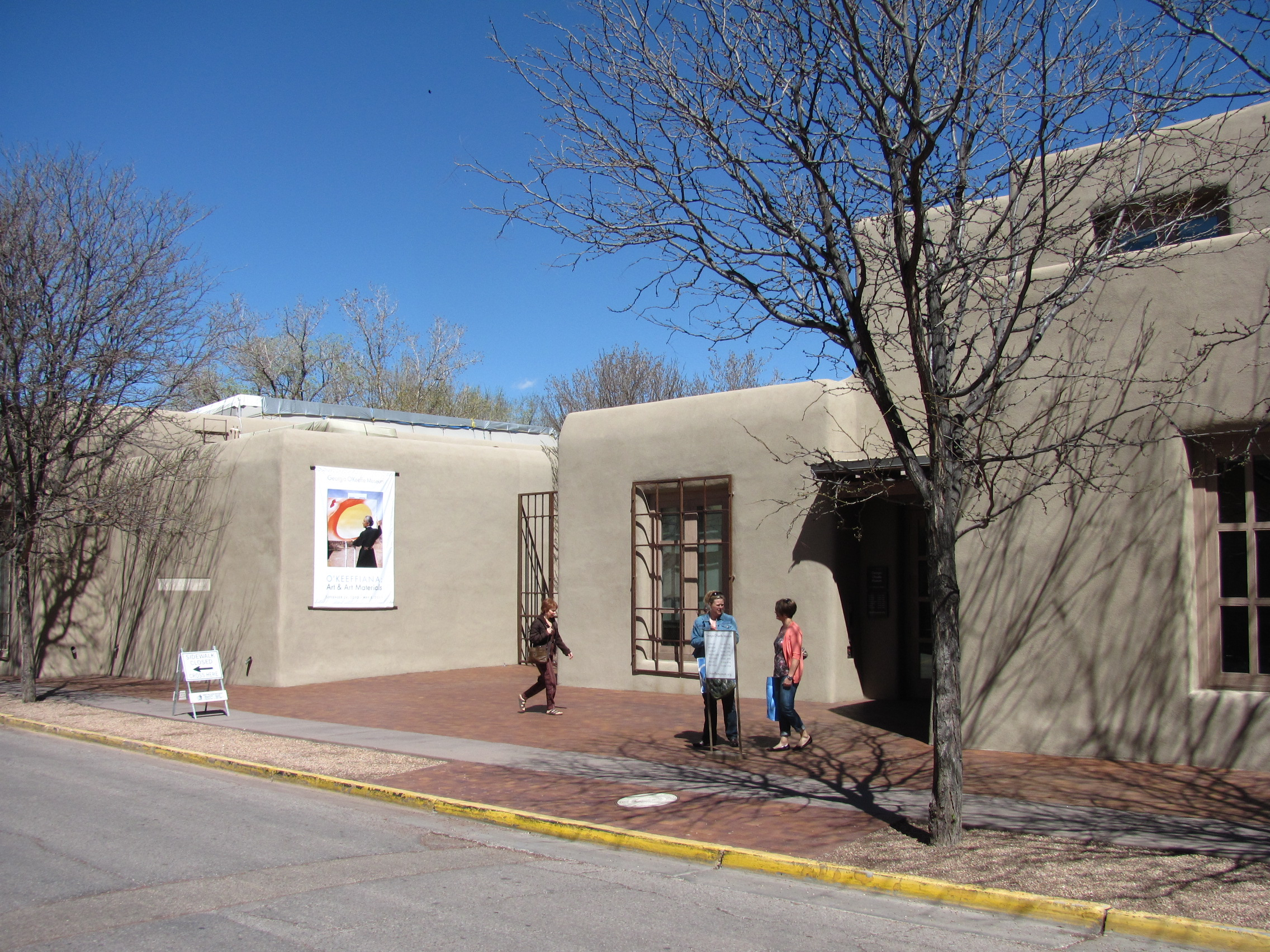
- Established: July 17, 1997
- Location: Santa Fe, New Mexico, U.S.; Abiquiu, New Mexico, U.S.
- Coordinates: 35.688961°N 105.94119°W
- Type: Art Museum and Historic Property
- Accreditation: American Alliance of Museums
- Founders: Anne Windfohr Marion & John L. Marion
- Director: Cody Hartley
- Chairperson: David Warnock
- Website: okeeffemuseum.org

The Georgia O'Keeffe Museum is dedicated to the artistic legacy of Georgia O'Keeffe, her life, American modernism, and public engagement. It opened on July 17, 1997, eleven years after the artist's death. It comprises multiple sites in two locations: Santa Fe, New Mexico, and Abiquiu, New Mexico. In addition to the founding Georgia O'Keeffe Museum (also called the Museum Galleries) in Santa Fe, the O'Keeffe includes: the Library and Archive within its research center at the historic A.M. Bergere house; the Education Annex for youth and public programming; Georgia O'Keeffe's historic Abiquiu Home and Studio; the O'Keeffe Welcome Center in Abiquiu; and Museum Stores in both Santa Fe and Abiquiu. Georgia O'Keeffe's additional home at the Ghost Ranch property is also part of the O'Keeffe Museum's assets, but is not open to the public.

== History ==
The private, non-profit museum was founded in November 1995 by philanthropists Anne Windfohr Marion and John L. Marion, part-time residents of Santa Fe. The museum's main building was designed by architect Richard Gluckman in association with Santa Fe firm Allegretti Architects. Gluckman's projects have included the gallery addition at the Whitney Museum of American Art's permanent collection in New York City and the Andy Warhol Museum in Pittsburgh, Pennsylvania.

Peter H. Hassrick and Jay Cantor led the museum during its first year. George King was director from 1998 to 2009. Robert Kret, served as director from 2009 to early 2019. Cody Hartley is the O'Keeffe's current director. Hartley joined the museum in 2013, and previously served as its director of curatorial affairs, senior director of collections and interpretation, and acting director. Of his vision for the museum, Hartley said, "I want our friends and neighbors to really think of the O’Keeffe as a beloved institution, as part of the community, as a good neighbor that does the kind programming and offers the kinds of community activities that really benefit their children and benefit themselves."

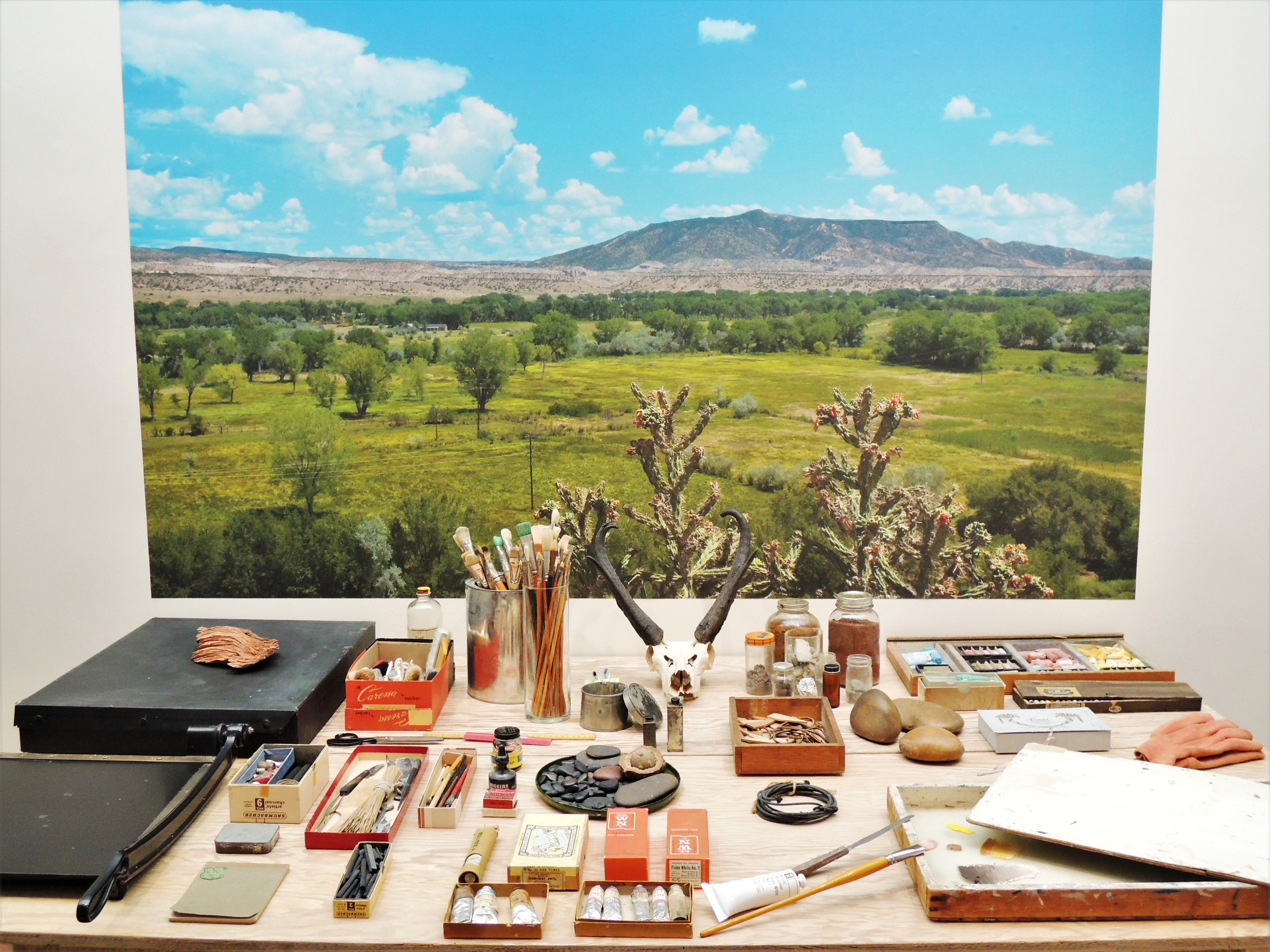
Painting materials as displayed at the museum

The museum's collections are the largest repository of Georgia O'Keeffe's work and personal materials, including items from her historic houses. Items from the collections rotate throughout the year in the Museum Galleries. Selected materials are also on view in the Library and Archives and the O'Keeffe Welcome Center. The Abiquiu Home and Studio was the artist's primary residence from the late 1940s through the end of her life. It includes the artist's garden, operated and harvested annually by local students. The museum's fine art collection includes many of Georgia O'Keeffe's key works. Subjects range from the artist's innovative abstractions to her iconic large-format flower, skull, and landscape paintings to paintings of architectural forms and rocks, shells, and trees. Initially, the collection was made of 140 O'Keeffe paintings, watercolors, pastels, and sculptures, but now includes nearly 1,200 objects.

== Exhibitions and featured installations ==
- 2008: Georgia O'Keeffe and the Women of the Stieglitz Circle (organized with the High Museum of Art, Atlanta, Georgia)
- 2008: Georgia O'Keeffe and Ansel Adams: Natural Affinities
- 2008: O'Keeffe in New Mexico: At the Education Annex
- 2008: Georgia O'Keeffe and the Camera: The Art of Identity
- 2009: Modernists in New Mexico: Works from a Private Collector
- 2009: Georgia O'Keeffe: Beyond Our Shores
- 2009: New Mexico and New York: Photographs of Georgia O'Keeffe
- 2010: Susan Rothenberg: Moving in Place (organized with the Modern Art Museum of Fort Worth)
- 2010: Georgia O'Keeffe: Abstraction (traveled to the Whitney Museum of American Art, New York, September 17, 2009 – January 17, 2010, and The Phillips Collection, Washington D.C., February 6, 2010 – May 9, 2010)
- 2010: O'Keeffiana Art and Art Materials
- 2011: Shared Intelligence: American Painting and the Photograph
- 2011: From New York to Corrymore: Robert Henri & Ireland
- 2012: Georgia O'Keeffe and the Faraway: Nature and Image
- 2013: Annie Leibovitz: Pilgrimage (organized by Smithsonian American Art Museum)
- 2013: Georgia O'Keeffe in New Mexico: Architecture, Katsinam, and the Land
- 2013: Modern Nature: Georgia O'Keeffe and Lake George (organized with The Hyde Collection, Lake George, New York)
- 2014: Georgia O’Keeffe and Ansel Adams: The Hawai'i Pictures
- 2014: Georgia O’Keeffe: Abiquiu Views
- 2014: Georgia O’Keeffe: Ghost Ranch Views
- 2015: Modernism Made in New Mexico
- 2016: Contemporary Voices: Susan York: Carbon
- 2016: O'Keeffe at the University of Virginia, 1912–1914
- 2017: Contemporary Voices: Journey to Center: New Mexico Watercolors by Sam Scott
- 2018: Contemporary Voices: The Black Place: Georgia O'Keeffe and Michael Namingha
- 2019: Contemporary Voices: Ken Price

To best share materials from its collection, the museum has moved away from the standard exhibition format, and rotates featured works on view in its Museum Galleries.

== Library and archive ==
The Michael S. Engl Family Foundation Library and Archive supports the museum's exhibitions, collections, and activities through research services and resources with an emphasis on studies of Georgia O’Keeffe and her contemporaries, related regional histories, and Modernism. The Library and Archive makes accessible a variety of materials to support research conducted by the public and the museum's staff. The Library and Archive is open to the public by advanced appointment.

Items from the collection and archive are publicly available through the museum's Collections Online.

== Georgia O'Keeffe's historic houses ==
Georgia O'Keeffe's Abiquiu Home and Studio is in Abiquiú, about 53 miles (85 km) north of Santa Fe. Public tours are available March through November.

The museum also owns and maintains Georgia O'Keeffe's other house at the Ghost Ranch property, 20 minutes north of Abiquiú. It is not currently open to the public. The Ghost Ranch educational retreat is not a part of the Georgia O'Keeffe Museum, but is owned and operated by the Presbyterian Church. It offers special tours related to the landscape that inspired many of Georgia O'Keeffe's iconic works.

== In popular culture ==
The museum and O'Keeffe's painting My Last Door were depicted in the 2010 episode "Abiquiu" of Breaking Bad, a crime drama series created by Vince Gilligan. Pluribus, a 2025 post-apocalyptic TV series also created by Gilligan, depicts the museum in "The Gap". The O'Keeffe painting Bella Donna, 1939 features prominently.

== See also ==
- List of single-artist museums
