= Amon G. Carter Stadium =

Stadium in Fort Worth, Texas, US

- "Hell's Half Acre"; "The Carter"
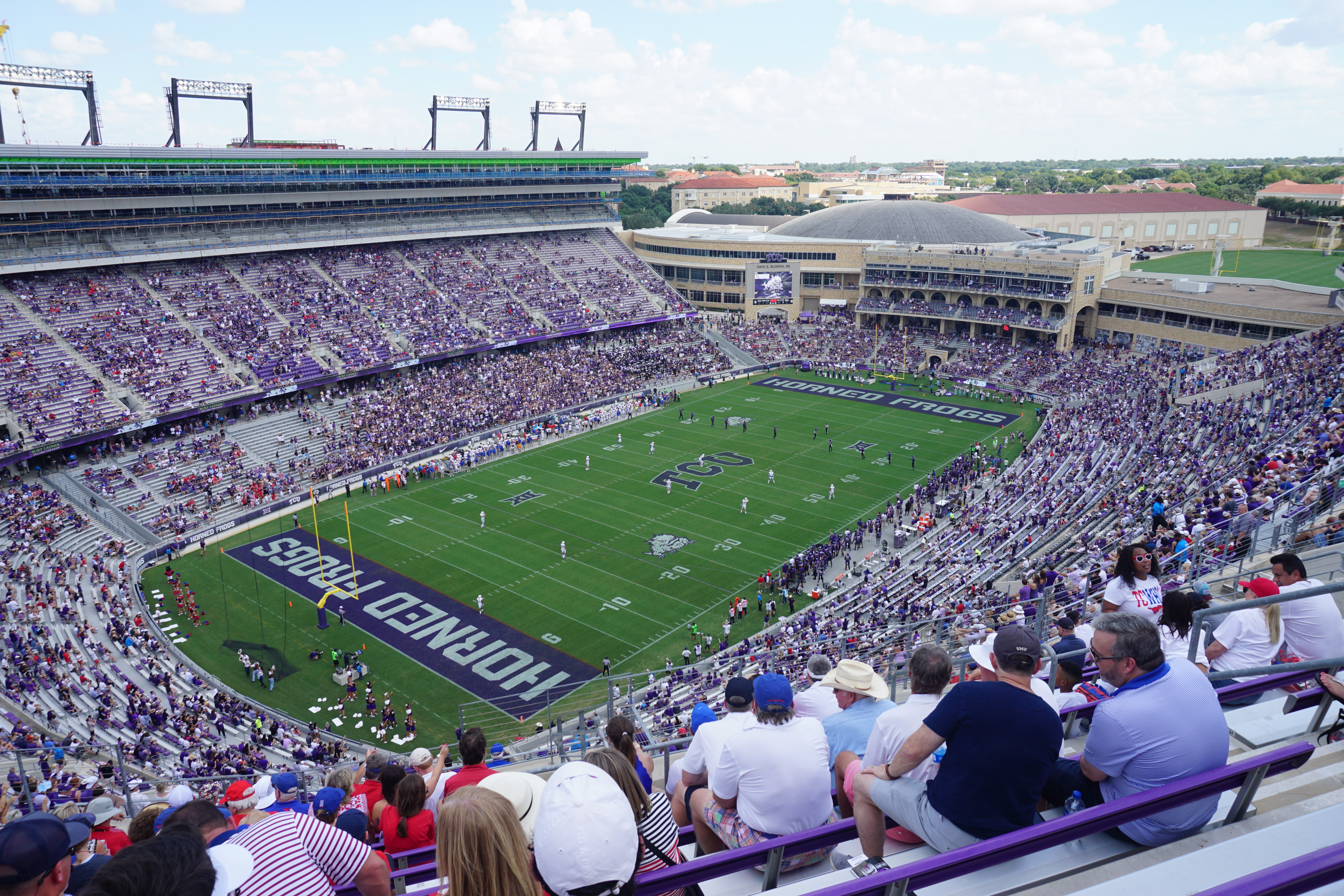
- View from northwest in 2019

- Location within the United States Location within Texas
- Interactive map of Amon G. Carter Stadium
- Address: 2850 Stadium Drive
- Location: Texas Christian University; Fort Worth, Texas, U.S.
- Coordinates: 32°42′35″N 97°22′5″W
- Elevation: 610 feet (190 m) AMSL
- Owner: Texas Christian University
- Operator: Texas Christian University
- Capacity: 53,294 (2023–present) Former capacity: List: 22,000 (1930–1947); 30,500 (1948–1950); 33,000 (1950–1952); 37,000 (1953–1955); 46,083 (1956–1990); 44,008 (1991–2007); 44,358 (2008–2010); 32,000 (2011); 45,000 (2012–2019)
- Surface: Grass: 1930–1972; Astro turf: 1973–1991; Tifway 419 Bermuda Grass: 1992–present
- Record attendance: 53,294 (vs. Colorado, September 2, 2023)

Construction
- Groundbreaking: 1929
- Opened: October 11, 1930; 95 years ago
- Cost: $164 million (2010–12 reconstruction) $100 million (2020 east side expansion)
- Architects: William Jasdon; HKS, Inc. (2010–12 reconstruction)

Tenants
- TCU Horned Frogs (NCAA) (1930–present); Armed Forces Bowl (NCAA) (2003–2009; 2012–present)

Website
- gofrogs.com/stadium

Amon G. Carter Stadium is an open-air college football stadium in the southern United States, located on the campus of Texas Christian University in Fort Worth, Texas. The home stadium of the TCU Horned Frogs football team, it is named after Amon G. Carter, a prominent Fort Worth businessman, newspaper publisher, and city booster. The venue has several popular nicknames, the most popular being "The Carter" and "Hell's Half Acre" (a reference to the site in Fort Worth's Wild West past, which was located near the stadium).

Between 2010 and 2012, the stadium underwent a $164 million reconstruction project. In 2019, the stadium underwent an additional $118 million east-side expansion.

== History ==
=== Planning and construction ===
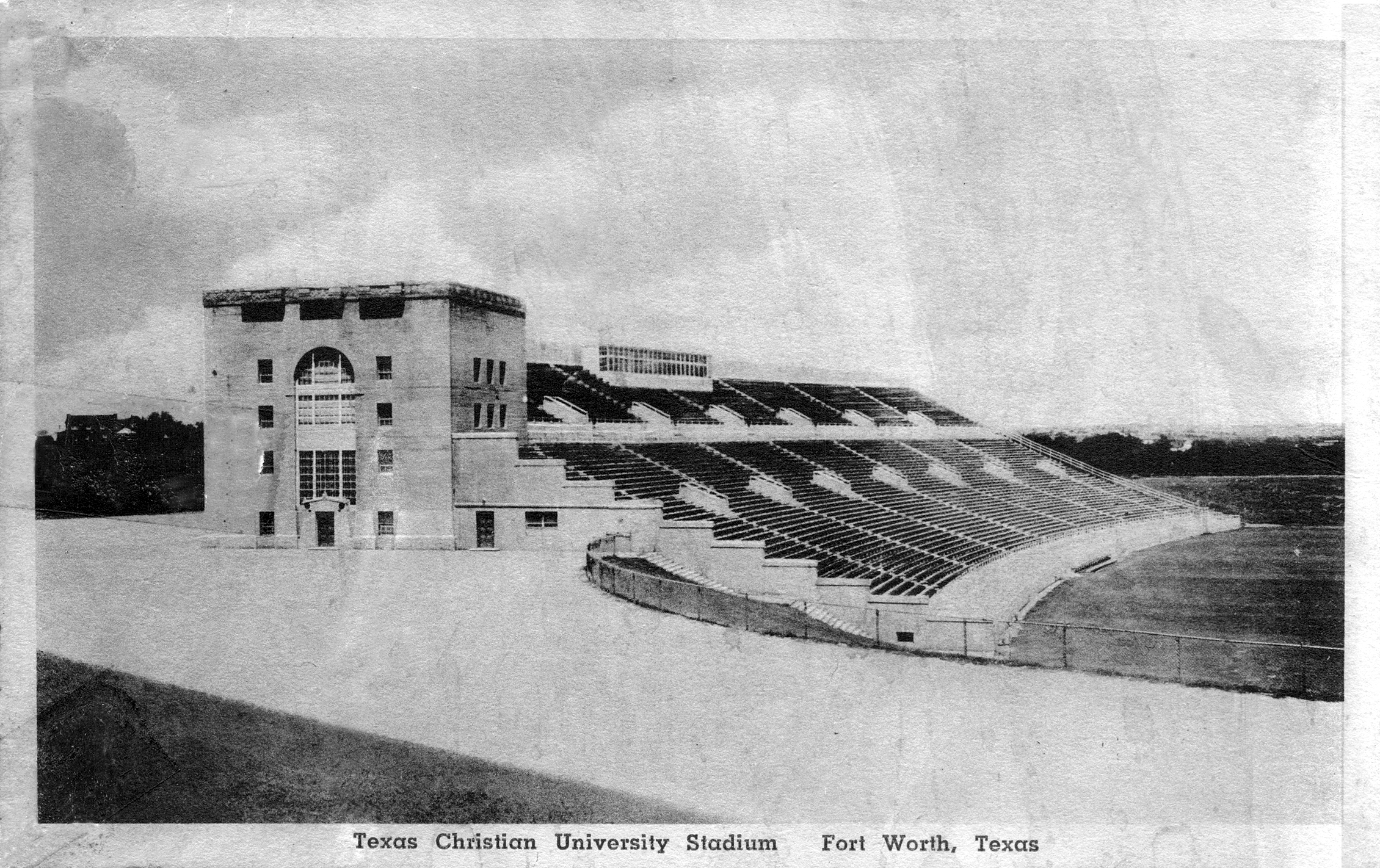
Postcard of Texas Christian University Stadium, undated

In 1923, TCU received a private donation from Mary Couts Burnett, the widow of a wealthy and well known Texas rancher. The Burnett donation constituted the egg for TCU's endowment. One condition of the Burnett donation was that a portion of it would be used for the construction of a new library, and it was decided to build the Mary Couts Burnett Library where the school's athletic field, Clark Field, was then located.

The removal of Clark Field necessitated the construction of a new field for athletic competition, especially in the sport of football. TCU played its first season of football in 1896, and since then had built a reputation of excellence garnering national attention, and joined the Southwest Conference in 1923.

In 1928, the school received a private financial donation from Amon G. Carter, publisher of the Fort Worth Star-Telegram and a fervent civic booster of Fort Worth in general. Carter asked Andrew Poyar, one of the designers of Shields-Watkins Field (now Neyland Stadium) at the University of Tennessee, to create the blueprints for the structure.

Amon Carter stadium was constructed from 1929 to 1930 with an original seating capacity of 22,000. The stadium hosted its first football game on October 11, 1930, when TCU defeated the University of Arkansas.

In the 1930s under head coach Dutch Meyer, the Horned Frogs won national championships in 1935 and 1938.

=== Expansion ===
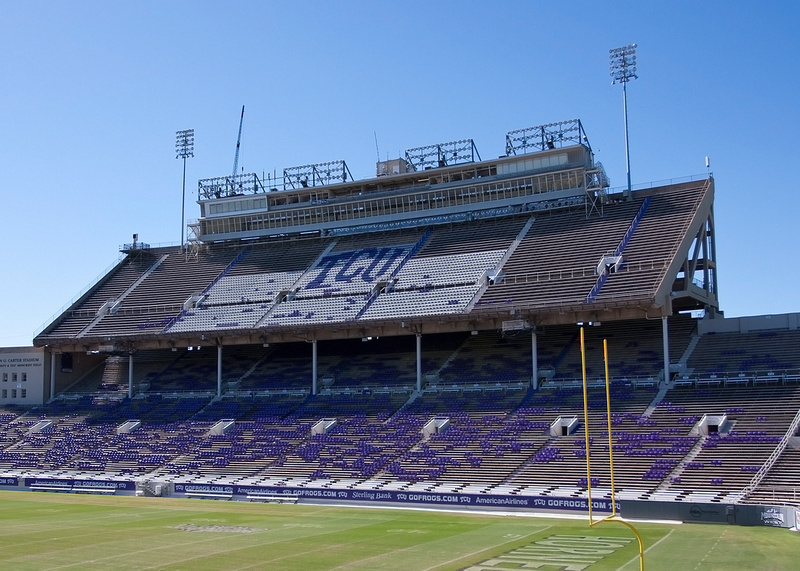
Amon Carter Stadium in 2008, prior to its demolition and reconstruction

The first expansion of the stadium took place in 1948, with construction raising the capacity by 8,500 to a total of 30,500. In 1951 and 1953, 2,500 and 4,000 more seats were added which raised capacity to 37,000 seats. An upper deck, topped by a two-story press box and highlighted with a large stylized "TCU", was added in 1956. This brought the stadium's capacity to 46,083.

In 1985 and 1991, improvements were made to the seating. This involved replacing the old seats in the lower bowl with aluminum bleachers. The upper-deck seats were later replaced in the same way. This reduced the stadium capacity to 44,008 spectators.

In 1992, the artificial turf, which had been in place since 1973, was replaced with natural grass. In 2002, the David E. Bloxom, Sr. Foundation helped install a new scoreboard and videoboard.

New club seats and luxury suites were added prior to the 2008 season, increasing capacity to 44,358, and again in 2020.

=== Renovation/Reconstruction ===
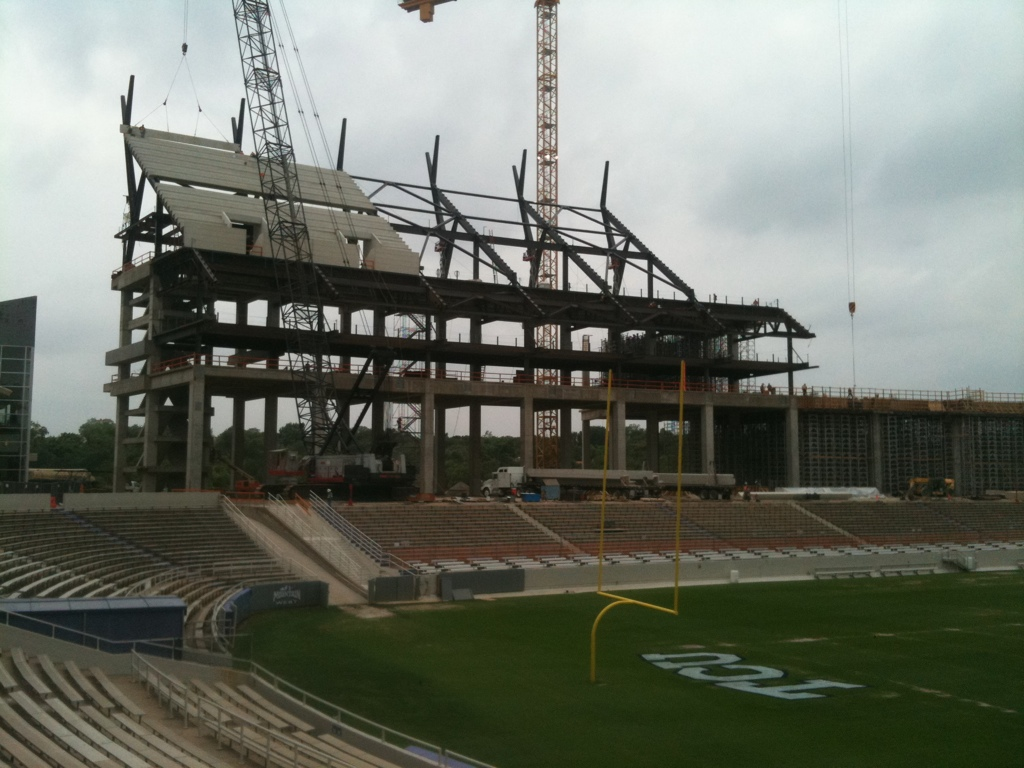
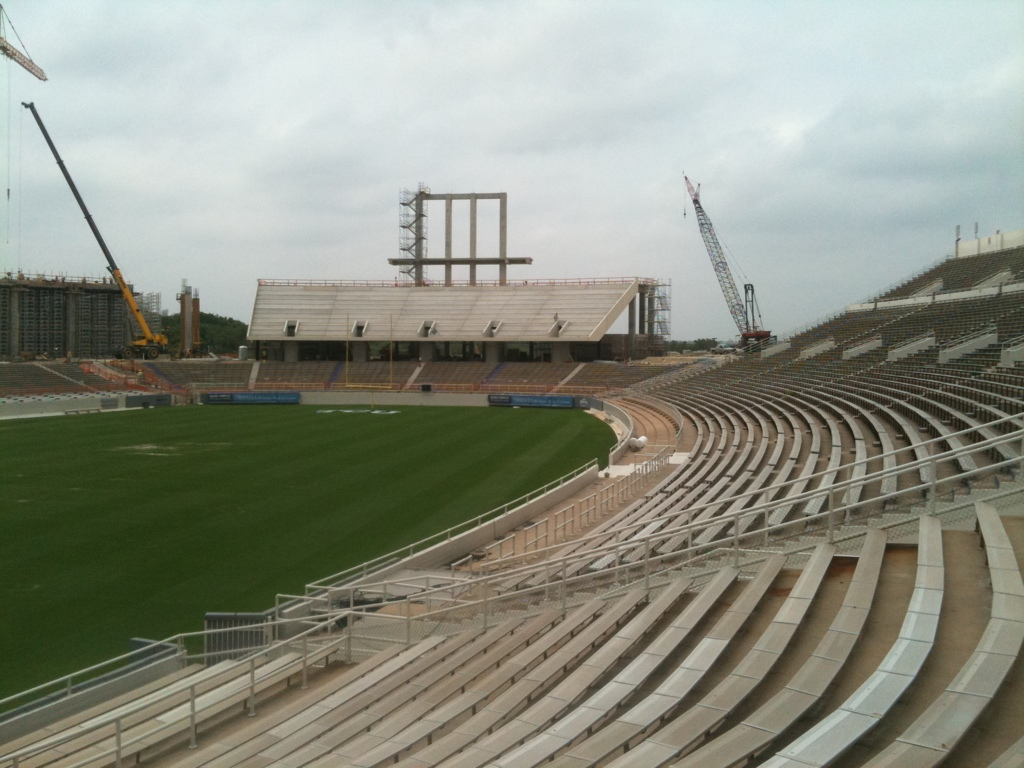
Construction on the West grandstand and enzone in May 2011

In August 2010, TCU announced a $105 million renovation of the west side and north end zone of Amon G. Carter Stadium to better enhance football fans' experience, upgrade amenities, and transform the historic Fort Worth icon into the "Camden Yards" of collegiate football stadiums.

The planned renovation quickly expanded into a rebuild of the entire stadium above ground level, and partially below. Only the below-ground-level playing field and lower seating bowl were retained. Everything else, including much of the subterranean infrastructure, was rebuilt. The West-side stands were imploded on December 5, 2010, and the East-side stands were demolished during the early winter 2011. The stadium reconstruction was funded completely by donor support (no bonds or debt). The project was fully completed in 2012 at a total cost of $164 million.

In 2019 the stadium underwent an additional $118 million East side expansion.

== Features ==
=== Attendance ===
The highest ever recorded attendance at Amon G. Carter was 53,294, which occurred in the 2023 season opener against Colorado.

The 2012 home season was the first time an entire season was sold out at Amon G. Carter Stadium.

=== Largest Crowds ===
Rank	Date	Attendance	Result
1	Sept. 2, 2023	53,294	TCU 42, Colorado 45
2	Sept. 23, 2023	51,243	TCU 34, SMU 17
3	Nov. 11, 2023	50,812	TCU 26, Texas 29
4	Dec. 27, 2024	50,754	Navy 21, Oklahoma 20
5	Nov. 14, 2009	50,307	TCU 55, Utah 28
6	Oct. 15, 2022	49,594	TCU 43, Oklahoma State 40 2OT
7	Oct. 1, 2022	49,095	TCU 55, Oklahoma 24
8	Sep. 14, 2024	48,889	TCU 34, UCF 35
9	Oct. 3, 2015	48,694	TCU 50, Texas 7
10	Oct. 26, 2013	48,212	TCU 7, Texas 30

=== Playing surface ===
Since 2003, the stadium's playing surface has been named W.A. "Monty & Tex" Moncrief Field, usually shortened to Moncrief Field, after W. A. "Tex" Moncrief Jr. and his father W. A. "Monty" Moncrief Sr. The naming came following a $3 million donation by Tex to the football program.

== Usage ==
=== Armed Forces Bowl ===
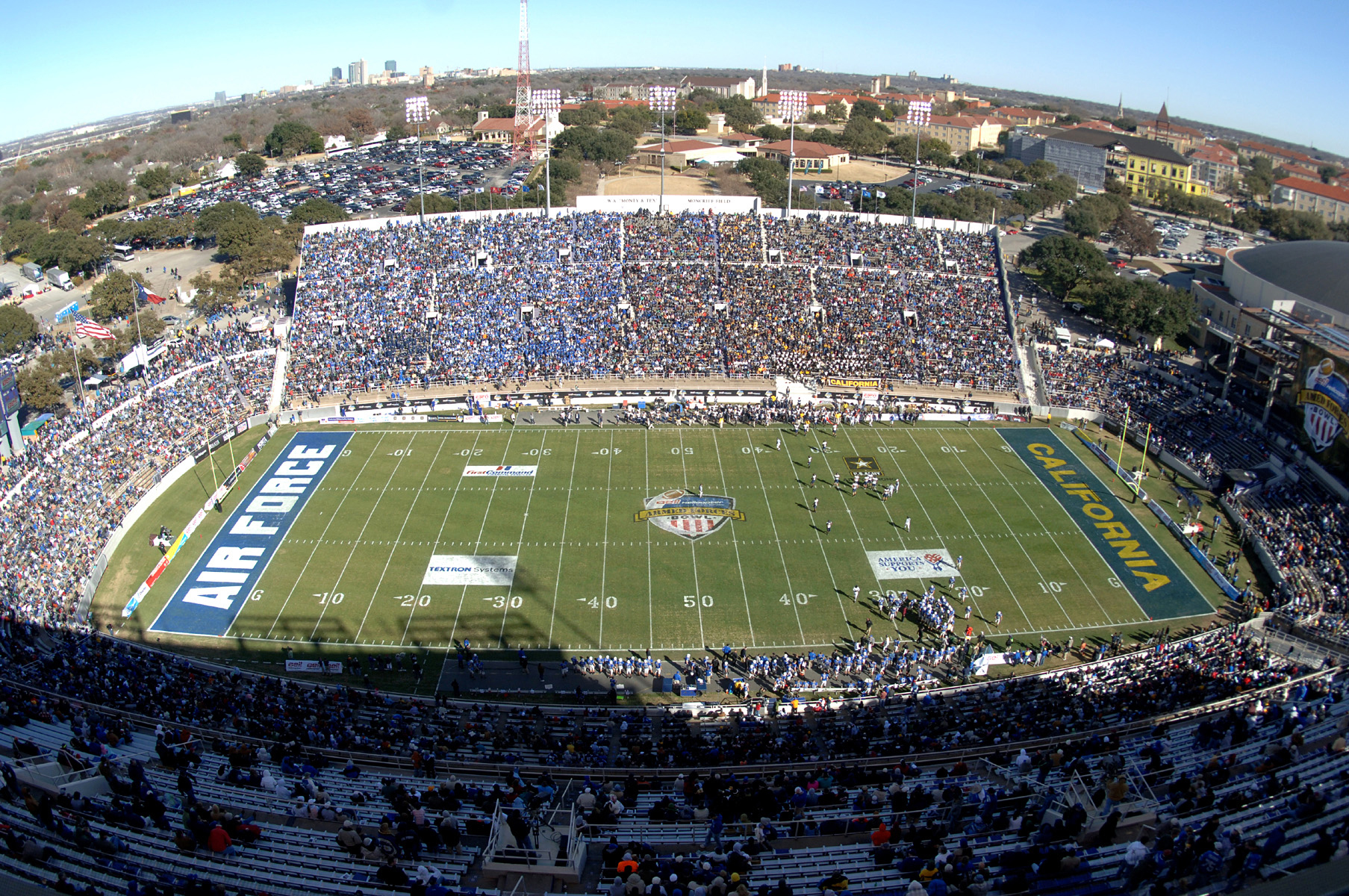
Panorama of the stadium, taken during the 2007 Armed Forces Bowl

The Armed Forces Bowl, previously the Fort Worth Bowl, has been played annually at Amon Carter Stadium since 2003. The bowl game was temporarily moved, however, to SMU's Gerald Ford Stadium in Dallas for the 2010 and 2011 bowl seasons due to the reconstruction.

An earlier bowl game, the Fort Worth Classic, was played in Fort Worth at the predecessor to Amon Carter Stadium in 1921.

=== TCU Horned Frogs ===
Located on the TCU campus, Amon Carter Stadium is the home field of the TCU Horned Frogs football team and marching band.

=== COVID-19 Vaccinations ===
In February 2021, the parking lots of the stadium were used to stage a drive-through COVID-19 vaccination site. The operation is a collaboration between TCU, Baylor Scott & White Health and Tarrant County Public Health, with doses being administered in part by faculty and students from both the TCU/UNT Health Science Center and TCU's Harris College of Nursing. Over the course of twelve weeks, more than 19,000 vaccine doses were administered at the site.

== Gallery ==
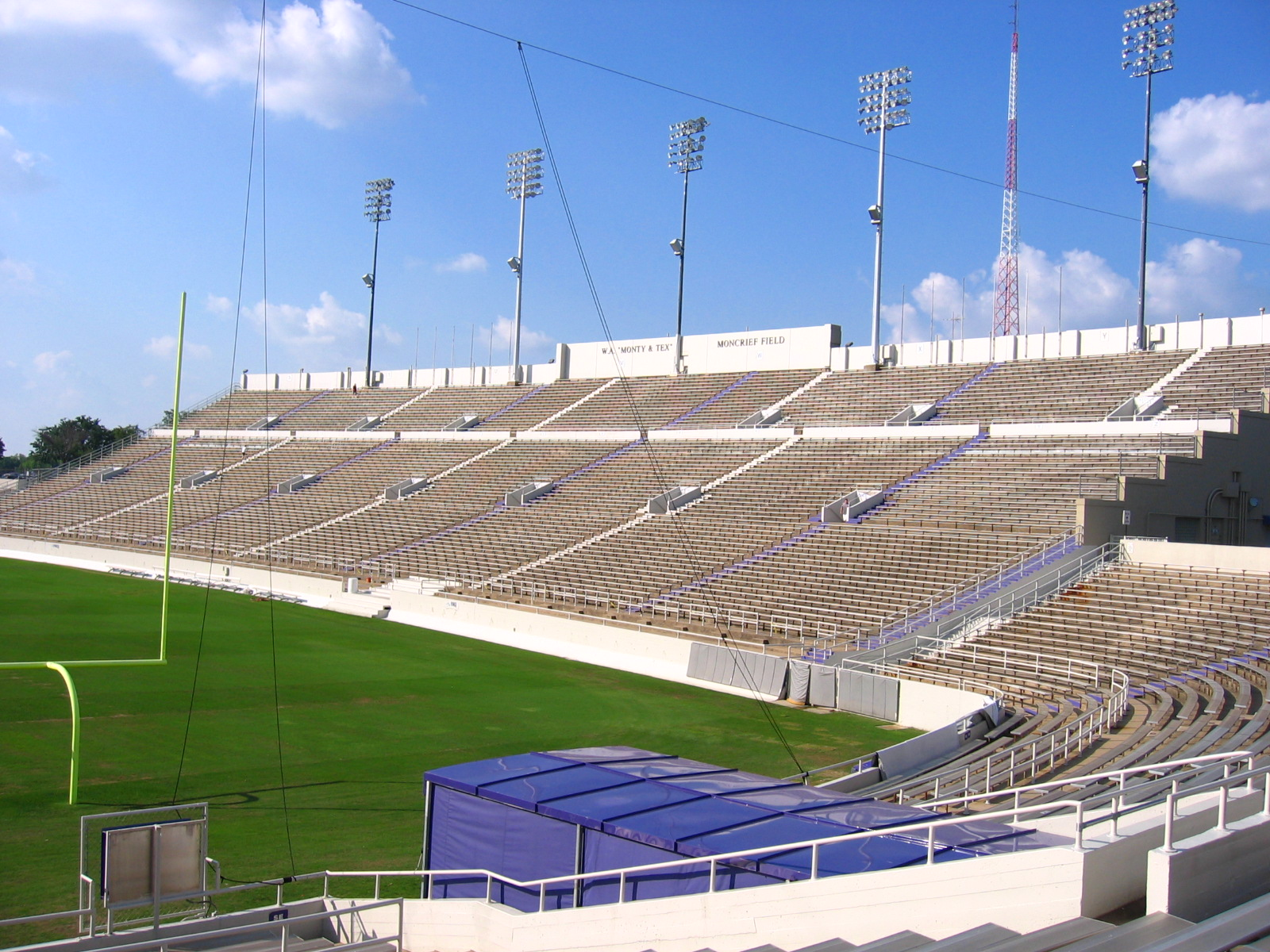
Grandstands in 2007

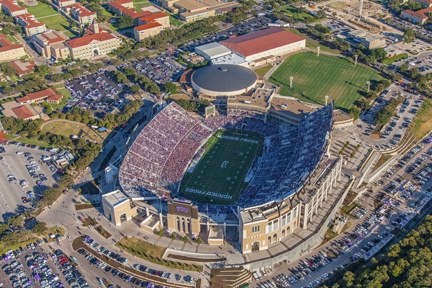
Aerial view, 2012

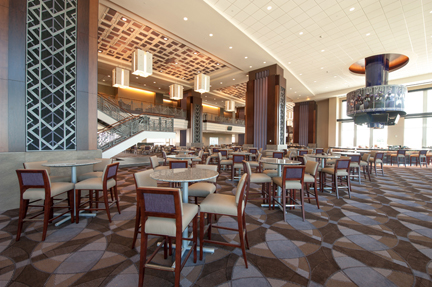
Champions Club, 2012

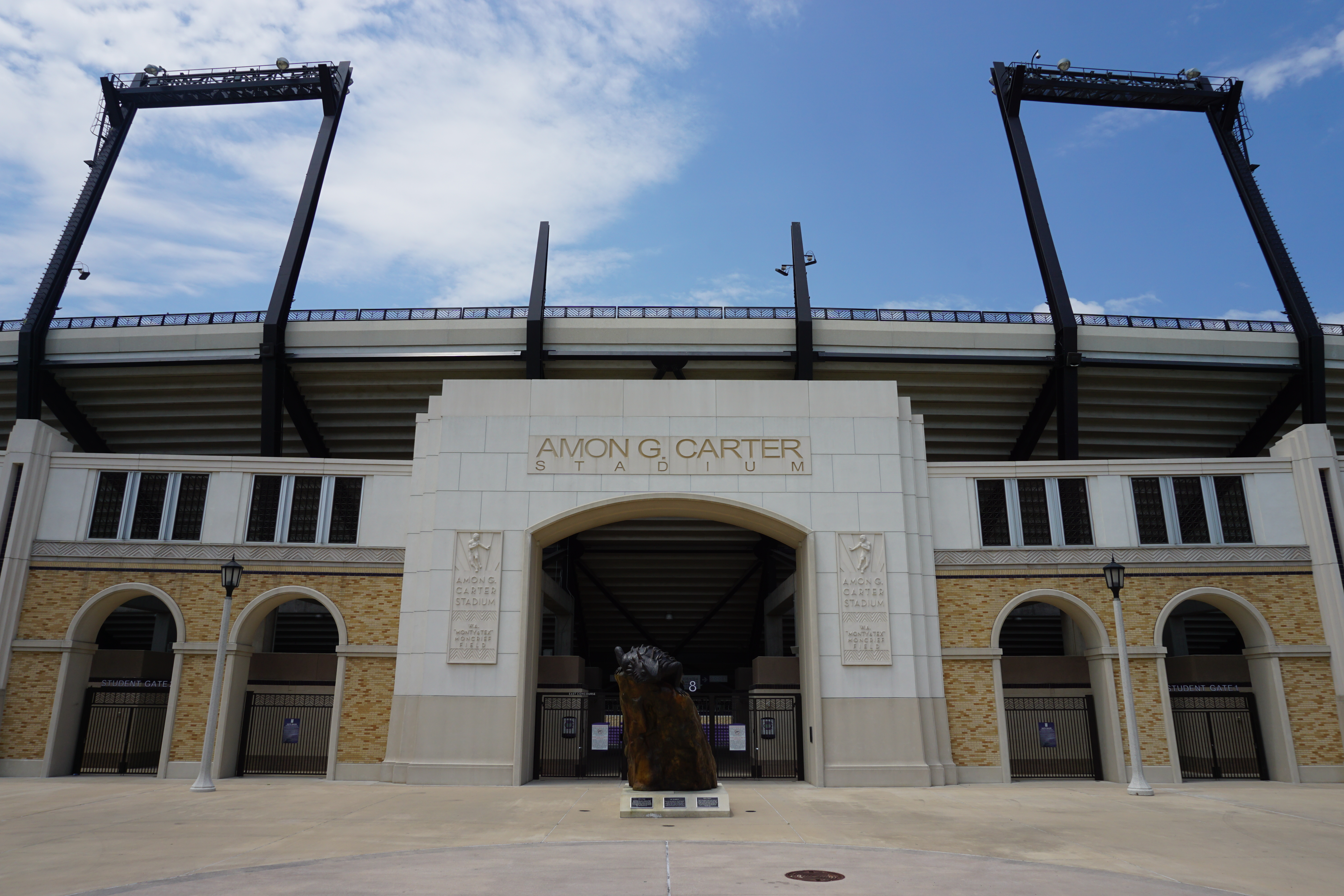
Entrance, 2017

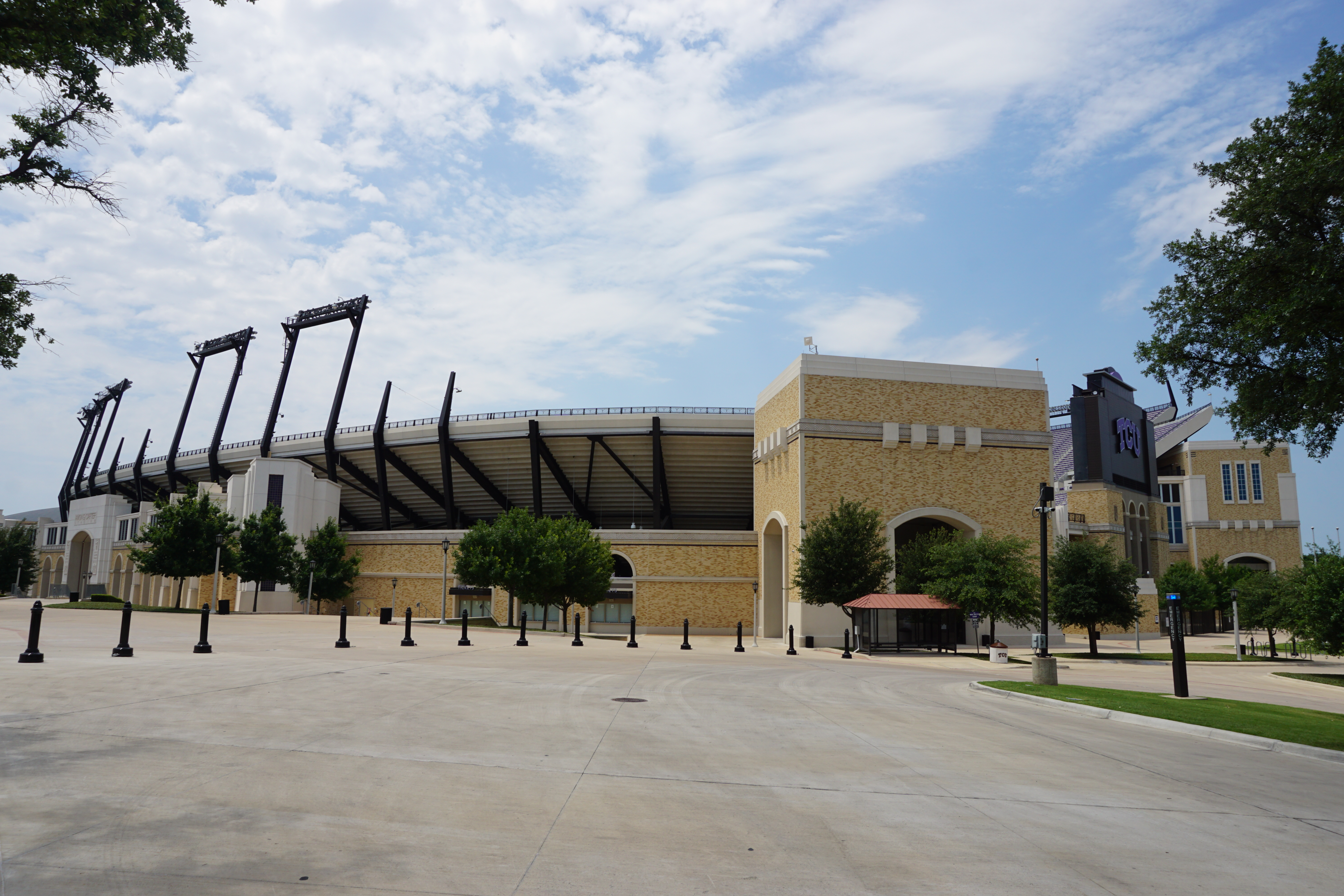
Exterior view, 2017

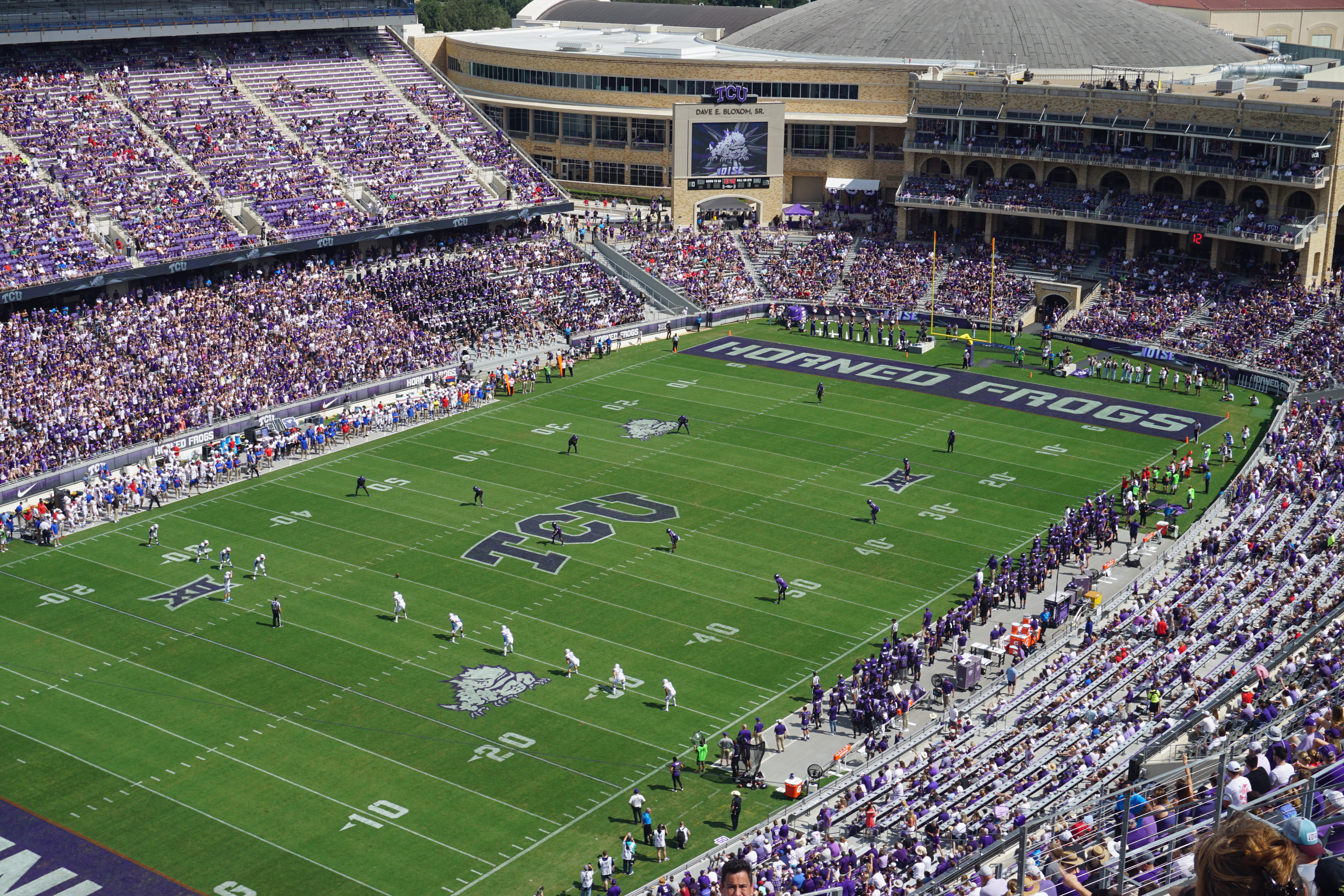
Football game, 2019

== See also ==
- List of NCAA Division I FBS football stadiums
- List of American football stadiums by capacity
- Lists of stadiums
