= Mary Couts Burnett =

American philanthropist

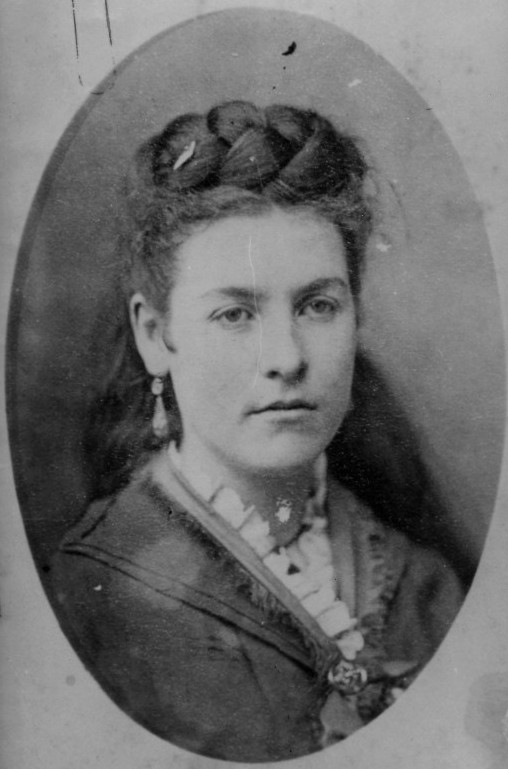
- Born: July 1856; Lawrence County, Arkansas, US
- Died: December 16, 1924 (aged 68); Fort Worth, Texas, US
- Resting place: Oakwood Cemetery, Fort Worth, Texas
- Spouse(s): Claude Barradel; Samuel Burk Burnett (m. 1892)

Mary Couts Burnett (1856 – December 16, 1924) was a wealthy philanthropist who donated the bulk of her estate to Texas Christian University. The endowment was used to establish the Mary Couts Burnett Library at the university.

== Early life ==
Mary Couts was born July 1856, to James R. Couts in Lawrence County, Arkansas. Her father was a cattleman who relocated his family to Parker County, Texas, where he established a bank in Weatherford. Along with John N. Simpson in 1875, he also established the longhorn cattle Hashknife Ranch in Taylor County. Mary's first husband Claude Barradel died.

== Samuel Burk Burnett ==
On September 13, 1892, she married divorced cattle baron Samuel Burk Burnett. Before their marriage, Burnett had made his fortune in cattle ranching, establishing the Four Sixes Ranch. He partnered with Quanah Parker to lease grazing land on Comanche and Kiowa reservations in Oklahoma, making Parker wealthy as well. Burnett counted Theodore Roosevelt among his friends. Mary and Samuel Burnett made their home in Fort Worth, Texas. The couple had one child, Samuel Burk Burnett Jr., who died one month short of his twenty-first birthday in 1916.

The marriage became contentious, in part because of Samuel Burnett's relationship with his granddaughter Anne Valliant Burnett Tandy. The situation deteriorated to the point in 1920 that Mary began to mention to others that Burnett was planning to murder her. Samuel Burnett's reaction was to have her declared legally insane and committed to an asylum in a private home. She broke out of the asylum on the day of her husband's death on June 26, 1922. Her personal physician, Charles Harris, assisted her in getting the insanity ruling reversed. She also successfully challenged her husband's will that left his entire $6 million estate to his granddaughter. The court ruled that she was to receive half of the estate.

== Mary Couts Burnett Library ==
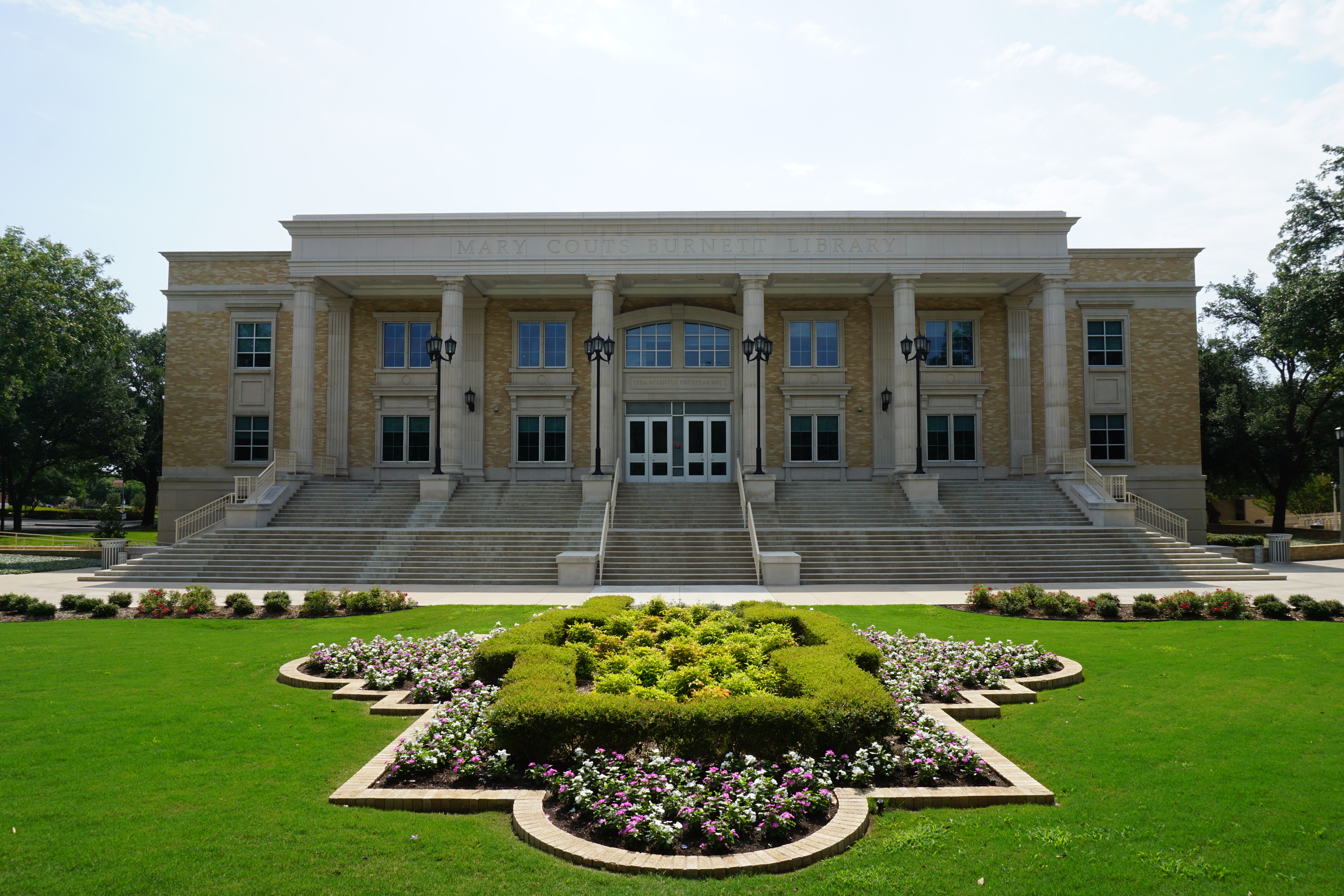
Mary Couts Burnett Library

In December 1923, she bequeathed $12,000 to the Dixon Colored Orphanage in Gilmer. The remainder of her $3 million estate was bequeathed to Texas Christian University. The monies were used to replace the existing library at TCU, which had been housed in the university's administration building. In accordance with the terms of Burnett's will, $150,000 was immediately allocated for the construction of a new library building. The architects were W. G. Clarkson and Company. TCU president E.M. Waits requested the new building be named the Mary Couts Burnett Library. The library is the repository for the papers and memorabilia of former Congressman and Speaker of the House Jim Wright.
