= Samuel Burk Burnett =

American rancher (1849–1922)

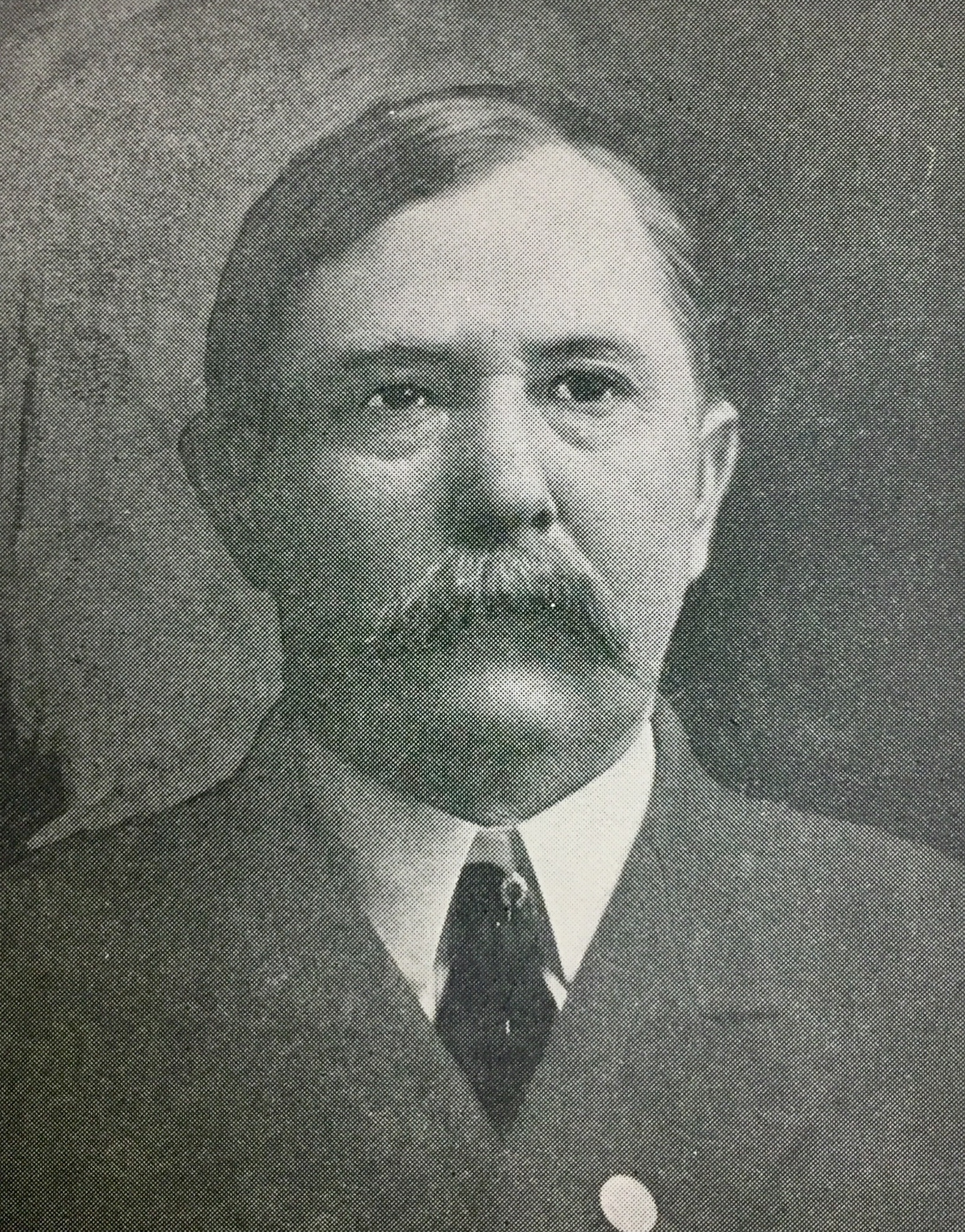
- Burnett in 1914
- Born: January 1, 1849; Bates County, Missouri, U.S.
- Died: June 27, 1922 (aged 73); Fort Worth, Texas, U.S.
- Occupations: Cattleman, rancher
- Spouse(s): Ruth B. Loyd; Mary Couts Burnett
- Children: 4, including Thomas Lloyd Burnett and Burk Burnett Jr.
- Parent(s): Jeremiah Burnett; Mary (Turner) Burnett
- Relatives: Bruce Burnett (brother); Martin B. Lloyd (father-in-law); Anne Valliant Burnett Tandy (granddaughter); Anne Windfohr Marion (great-granddaughter)

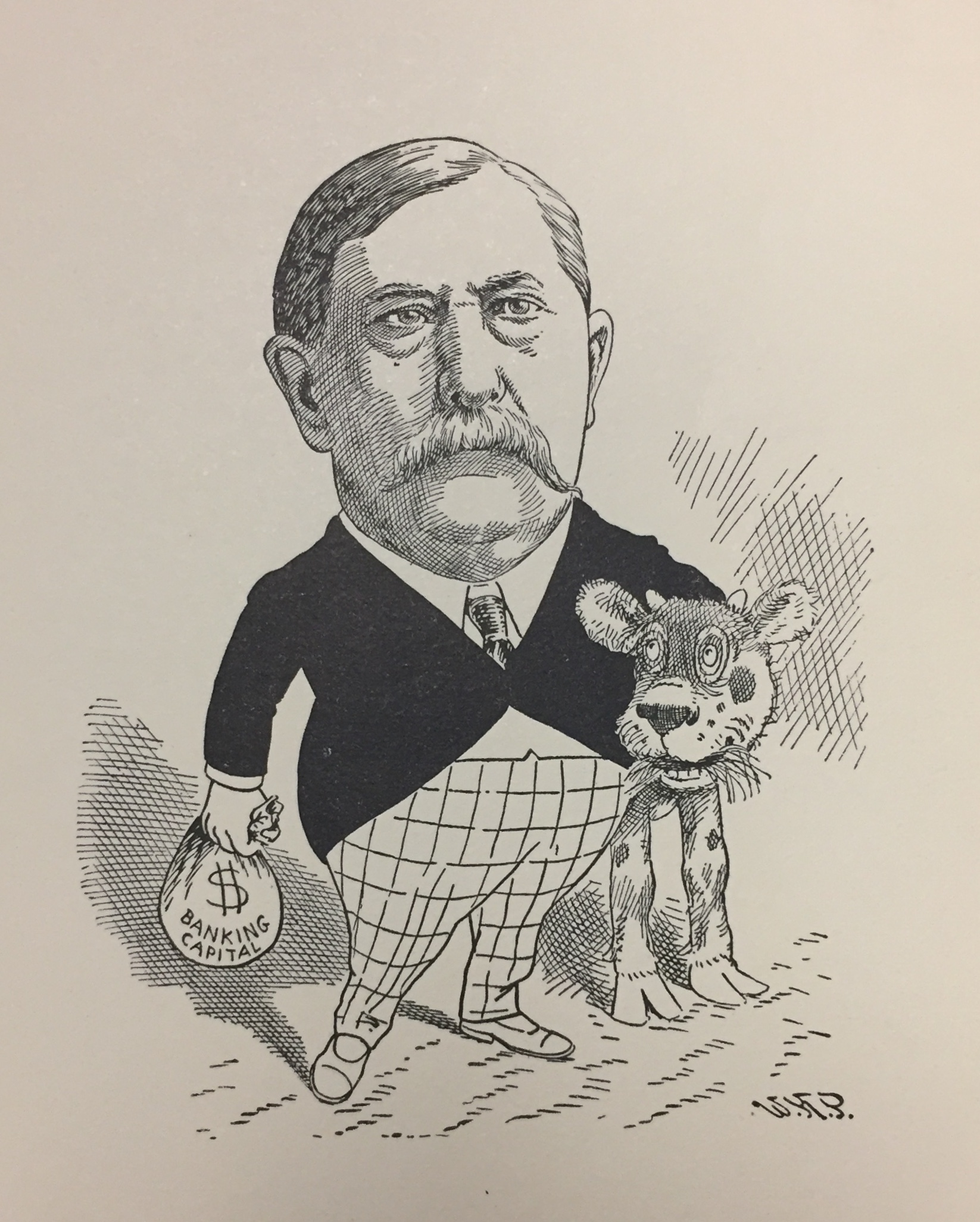
1914 caricature of Samuel Burk Burnett (1849-1922)

Samuel Burk Burnett (January 1, 1849 – June 27, 1922) was an American cattleman and rancher from Texas, owner of the 6666 Ranch, and namesake of Burkburnett, Texas.

== Early life ==
Samuel Burk Burnett was born on January 1, 1849, in Bates County, Missouri, to parents originally from Virginia. His father, Jeremiah Burnett, was a farmer; his mother was Mary (Turner) Burnett. He had a brother, Bruce Burnett, who later became a rancher in his own right. In 1857–1858, the family moved into a house by the Denton Creek in Denton County, Texas, where his father became a cattleman. It was then that Burnett, only ten years of age, learned ranching from his father.

== Career ==
In 1868, at the age of nineteen, "Burk" Burnett, as he was known, purchased one hundred head of cattle which were branded '6666,' from Frank Crowley. During the Panic of 1873, he drove 1,100 steers to Wichita, Kansas, and sold them for US$10,000 in 1874, thus making a fortune for the time. Later that year, he purchased 1,300 more cattle and drove them along the Chisholm Trail to the open range land by the Little Wichita River. He purchased land near Wichita Falls, Texas, before the town was built. Due to the droughts of the 1880s, he moved his cattle to the Big Pasture in southwestern Oklahoma. He rented 300,000 acres of land, where his 10,000 head of cattle grazed. Meanwhile, his son Thomas worked as a cowhand on the Big Pasture.

In 1900, Burnett purchased the 8 Ranch, later known as the 6666 Ranch, near Guthrie, Texas, from the Louisville Land and Cattle Company. He also acquired the Dixon Creek Ranch near Panhandle, Texas. In 1917, he built a ranchhouse in Guthrie designed by architects Sanguinet and Staats at a cost of US$100,000. Guests included President Theodore Roosevelt and comedian Will Rogers. Four years later, in 1921, shortly before his death, oil was discovered near the Dixon Creek on his 6666 Ranch.

Burnett was president of the Fort Worth Stock Show from 1908 until his death in 1922. He was the organization's second president, noted for expanding the scope of the event to include exhibits and a rodeo, and renaming to the Southwestern Exposition and Fat Stock Show.

Burnett also served on the board of directors of the First National Bank of Fort Worth, the State Bank of Burkburnett, and the Cattle Raisers Association of Texas. He was also President of the Ardmore Oil and the Gin Milling Company.

== Personal life, death and legacy ==
Burnett first married Ruth B. Lloyd, the daughter of Martin B. Lloyd, founder of the First National Bank of Fort Worth. They had three sons, two of whom died. Their third son, Thomas Lloyd Burnett, became a rancher. The couple divorced.

His second marriage was to Mary Couts Burnett in 1892. They had a son, Burk Burnett Jr., who died in 1917. They resided in Fort Worth, Texas. However, he disinherited her and had her committed in a mental asylum. After his death, she sued and managed to secure a settlement of several million dollars, but did not inherit his ranching or oil concerns.

Burnett died on June 27, 1922, in Fort Worth, Texas. His ranching and oil interests were held in trust until his granddaughter, Anne, received her inheritance in 1922. In 1980, it was inherited by his great-granddaughter, Anne Windfohr Marion, who served as President of Burnett Ranches and Chairman of the Burnett Oil Company.

The town of Burkburnett in Wichita County, Texas was named in his honor by President Theodore Roosevelt. Indeed, the president had been coyote and wolf hunting there with Burnett before the town was established. As a result, the president's suggestion stuck, immortalizing Burnett's name in this location.

Burnett was a member of the Elks, Knights of Pythias, and the River Crest Country Club in Fort Worth. In 1969, he was inducted into the Hall of Great Westerners of the National Cowboy & Western Heritage Museum.
