= James Goodwin Hall =

- Born: October 12, 1896
- Died: 1952 (aged 55–56); New York City, U.S.
- Resting place: Arlington National Cemetery
- Occupations: Stockbroker, business executive, pilot, horse breeder
- Spouse(s): Ida Belle Thomas; Anne Valliant Burnett Tandy; Tamara Cecil
- Children: Howard Earle Coffin Hall; Anne Windfohr Marion

James Goodwin Hall (October 12, 1896 – 1952) was an American stockbroker, business executive, pilot and horse breeder, and oversaw the 8th Air Force and 9th Air Force Photo Reconnaissance during World War II. He was critical in the establishment of Quarter Horses as a separate breed.

== Early life ==
James Goodwin Hall was born October 12, 1896, to James Gustin Hall and Annie J. Virgin. His brother, Claude Pinkney Hall was born February 10, 1898.

== World War I - 1922 Military Service ==
Hall served as a pilot during World War I. He enlisted in the Aviation Section of the Signal Corps on August 10, 1917; completed his preliminary training, and was commissioned January 18, 1918. He then trained in France in the Advanced Bombing School, Claremont Ferrand and assigned to duty with Escadrille BR III (French Day Bombardment Squadron.) On the 10th of October, 1918, he was relieved from duty with the French and assigned to the 163rd Day Bombardment Squadron, A.E.F.; he was appointed Flight Commander October 15, 1918. He served with this Squadron until hostilities ceased and the Group Commander on January 8, 1919, strongly recommended him for a commission in the Regular Army, stating that he had been under his own close observation, that he was excellent material, and that if commissioned he would like to have Lieutenant Hall under his own command. His Squadron Commander rated him as an excellent pilot and states that he performed all his duties as a Flight Commander with remarkable success. Hall served at the front lines until the Armistice.

Hall was credited with the following World War I Campaigns.

- Champagne-Marne from 15 July 1918 - 18 July 1918
- Aisne-Marne from 18 July 1918 - 6 August 1918
- Montdider, Noyen from 8 August 1918 - 16 August 1918
- Oise Aisne 18 August 1918
- St. Mihiel from 12 September 1918 - 16 September 1918
- Meuse-Argonne from 26 September 1918 - 11 November 1918

He received the following awards.

- French Croix de Guerre with Palm and Star.
- Victory Medal with six battle clasps.

After the war ended, he returned to the U.S. in 1919 and was assigned to duty in the office of Chief of Air Corps. He was on duty as Pilot with the Victory Loan Flying Circus, Major H.J.F. Miller, Commander. They toured 22 states, and 30 cities in 30 days. He also completed a Naval Aviation course, seaplanes, flying boats, and navigation at North Island Naval Station in San Diego, California in October 1919. He then participated in the first transcontinental airplane race San Francisco to New York in October 1919. U.S. Army First Transcontinental Mail Survey. He then departed for the Philippine Islands where he was assigned as Flight Commander of 2nd Aero Squadron in December 1919.

James G. Hall chose to resign from the military in 1920. He wished to take a position in civil life due to the future of Air Service being unsettled and uncertain. He stated in a memo that it was not his intent to remain in service permanently. He was then approved for discharge from the military as a 1st Lieutenant in the Air Service, May 8, 1920, while still in Manila, Philippine Islands. Upon resignation, Hall accepted a position with the Curtiss Aeroplane and Motor Company as Assistant to the President in 1923.

When he returned to the U.S. from the Philippines in early summer of 1920, he lived life as a civilian before choosing to rejoin the Air Service almost a year later. Hall was commissioned a 2nd Lt. Air Service in the Officer Reserve Corps in April 1921. The commission was approved October 25, 1921. He reported for duty at Fort Sill, Oklahoma where he was appointed 2nd Lt. Field Artillery Regular Army, on 22 August 1921, commission effective November 1, 1921. He signed his Oath of Office for the 2nd Lt. Field Artillery on November 25, 1921.

Hall remained at Fort Sill as an artillery instructor until he requested a discharge by way of resignation. His wife was found to have tubercular trouble and a move to a warmer climate was required. During his time at Fort Sill, he was promoted to a 1st Lieutenant in a Field Artillery Division. His service ended and he officially resigned from the military as of August 25, 1922.

== Career ==
James G. Hall had a career that focused on aviation, transportation, and the stock market. The highlights of his career life, prior to World War II include:

- Completed reorganization work for the Curtiss Company in 1925. Associated with Howard Earle Coffin (chairman, Aircraft Production Board, 1917–1918), from 1925 to 1930. Assisted in organization of National Air Transport, National Aeronautic Association and Curtiss-Wright.
- Around 1926–27, Hall was hired by Samuel Ungerleider & Company which had its headquarters in New York City.
- On December 14, 1928, Hall purchased a seat on the New York Stock Exchange. He later sold his seat only to return and purchase another on December 11, 1931. At that same time he joined the firm J.R. Timmins & Co.
- Hall formed a co-partnership with Collins, Hall & Peckham, a brokerage firm, on January 23, 1929.
- Later, he served as the vice president of Graham-Paige, a car company, where he was in charge of the Southwestern United States.

== Aviation ==
On July 7, 1928, Hall and Enos Curtin, both employed by Samuel Ungerleider & Company, took off in Hall's Stearman seaplane from the East River in New York City. Destination was Oskelanco, in Northern Quebec, Canada. The objective of this bold journey was, according to numerous newspaper reports that covered this occurrence, to “inspect some mining properties related to gold” for Ungerleider's Wall Street brokerage. Both men were expected back in New York that evening but failed to return. A sudden major localized rainstorm had brought the seaplane down 150 miles north of Oskelanco in Quebec, Canada – with a forced landing into a vast high mountain wilderness. Without any hope of rescue or being located, Hall, Curtin and intended return passenger R. T. Gilman of Montreal, had walked through the Canadian wilderness for several days.

In 1931, Hall became Commander of the Crusaders and helped to establish chapters throughout the U.S. to aid in the repeal of the 18th Amendment. He owned a Lockheed Orion "The Crusader" which established many flight records including the following:

- Los Angeles to New York
- New York to Havana, Cuba non-stop on July 21, 1931, and he surpassed Frank Hawks' flying speed record.
- Havana to New York non-stop record.
- New York - Chicago - New York, record 8 hours. Broke Hawks' record.
- Vancouver, B.C. to Aqua Caliente, Mexico, non-stop record, breaking Col. Roscoe Turner's, and many other records of shorter distances.
- Bendix Trophy Race, 1931 - Los Angeles, California to Cleveland, Ohio.

Prior to 1932, Hall had flown all types of single and multi-motored commercial and military equipment built prior to 1932. He owned several seaplanes and fast land planes.

== Equestrianism ==
Hall served as the first treasurer of the American Quarter Horse Association. In this capacity, he lobbied the National Stallion Board to recognize the Quarter Horse as a separate racing breed between 1941 and 1942. He also produced early films about Quarter Horses in the Southwest.

While Hall and Burnett made great strides to build the Quarter Horse as a racing breed, Hall's commitment to the military took center stage again in 1941 as evidenced in a letter to AQHA stating he'd been in Central and South America on military business. He then in 1942 had to resign from attending a show at Eagle Pass due to military commitments in Washington, D.C. The war was calling and Hall was ready to answer.

== Personal life ==
Hall first married Ida Belle Thomas (1892–1974) in 1921 in San Diego, California. They had a son Howard Earle Coffin Hall (1923–2012). The couple divorced in 1927.

Hall married a second time to Anne Valliant Burnett Tandy, the heiress of the 6666 Ranch, in 1932. They moved to Fort Worth, Texas and had a daughter, Anne Windfohr Marion. Hall's last marriage was to Tamara Cecil and the couple moved to New York City.

== World War II ==
Hall played a military role during World War II utilizing the relatively new photo reconnaissance technology. First as squadron commander of the 13th Photographic Reconnaissance Squadron, the 7th Group for the Eighth Air Force, and then later as Director of Reconnaissance and Photography for the Ninth Air Force. He would direct the promotion, development, and application of this technology. The photos mapped much of Germany's critical positions in the European theater in preparation for the D-Day invasion.

Aviation: During World War II, Hall flew both the P-38 and the RAF Spitfire. The Lockheed P-38 Lightning is an American single-seat, twin piston-engine fighter. The Spitfire was a British single-seat fighter aircraft used by the Royal Air Force (RAF) and other Allied countries during WWII. He also flew twin and four-engine bombers, specifically F-3A, the Douglas A-20 Havoc, a modified light bomber.

Principal Duties:

Type of Duty	Unit, Organization or Station	From	To
Squadron Commander	13th Photo Recon Squadron, Colorado Springs, CO	18 Aug 1942	1 Dec 1942
Squadron Commander	13th Photo Recon Squadron, England	1 Dec 1942	1 July 1943
Group Commander	7th Photo Group, England	1 Jul 1943	16 Sept 1943
Photo Aviation Branch	HQ, AAF, OC & R Washington, D.C.	16 Sept 1943	25 Nov 1943
Chief, Recon Branch	HQ, AAF, ACAS, OC & R Washington, D.C.	26 Nov 1943	31 Dec 1943
Chief, Recon Branch	HQ, AAF, ACAS, OC & R Washington, D.C.	1 Jan 1944	30 June 1944
Director of Recon & Photography	HQ Ninth Air Force ETO	9 Aug 1944	31 Dec 1944
Director of Recon & Photography	HQ Ninth Air Force ETO	1 Jan 1945	3 Oct 1945
Temporary Duty	HQ Ninth Air Force ETO	3 Oct 1945	18 Dec 1945
On Terminal Leave		18 Dec 1945	1 April 1946

Awards and Decorations: Hall was highly decorated during World War II. His awards and decorations include the following.

- Legion of Merit
- Distinguished Flying Cross with 1 Oak Leaf Cluster
- The Bronze Star Medal
- Air Medal with 4 Oak Leaf Clusters
- EAME Campaign Medal with 6 Bronze Service Stars
- Victory Medal Commander of the British Empire
- French Legion of Honor (Officer)
- French Croix de Guerre with 2 Palms
- Luxembourg Croix de Guerre
- Belgium Croix de Guerre

Highest Rank: Colonel

== Death and legacy ==
Hall died in 1952 in New York City. He was inducted into the American Quarter Horse Hall of Fame posthumously, in 1952. He was buried at the Arlington National Cemetery.

== Bibliography ==
- Hall, Doug. Legacy of the Skies: A Grandson's Tribute to a Legendary Aviator. Doug/Hall Publisher, 2025. ISBN 979-8218533786.
