= Jim Hall (Australian footballer) =

Australian rules footballer

Personal information
- Full name: James Henry Hall
- Born: 10 March 1919; Oakleigh, Victoria
- Died: 29 August 2006 (aged 87)
- Original team: Oakleigh
- Height: 168 cm (5 ft 6 in)
- Weight: 65 kg (143 lb)

Playing career^{1}
Years	Club	Games (Goals)
1943–1945	St Kilda	36 (55)
- ^{1} Playing statistics correct to the end of 1945.

Jim Hall (10 March 1919 – 29 August 2006) was an Australian rules footballer who played with St Kilda in the Victorian Football League (VFL). A rover, Hall was St Kilda's joint leading goal-kicker in 1945, with 21 goals. He had bettered that tally the previous year, when he kicked 24 goals, but he finished second in the goal-kicking behind Sam Loxton. Hall continued his career at Oakleigh, his original club, in 1946.
