= James M. Hall =

Scottish footballer

James Hall
Personal information
- Full name: James M Hall
- Place of birth: Scotland
- Position: Inside forward

Senior career*
Years	Team	Apps	(Gls)
1936–1937	Queen's Park	9	(2)

International career
1937	Scotland Amateurs	1	(0)
- * Club domestic league appearances and goals

James M. Hall was a Scottish amateur footballer who played as an inside forward in the Scottish League for Queen's Park. He was capped by Scotland at amateur level.
