= James Hall (pianist) =

American jazz musician

- Born: California
- Origin: United States
- Occupations: Jazz pianist and vibraphonist

James Hall is an American jazz pianist and vibraphonist.

== Career ==
Hall began taking piano lessons at age eight and began to play in public at age eleven. In 2017 and 2018, his first gig was in a group with trumpet and flugelhorn player Modesto Briseno and bassist Matt Finders in California, and he subsequently appeared with Seattle-based tenor saxophone player Anton Schwartz.

In 2018, he took up the vibraphone as a second instrument and in 2019 relocated to Central Florida. He participated in the relaunch of the New Smyrna Beach Jazz Festival in 2022, performing in a trio with drummer Greg Parnell following the festival's two-year hiatus. His trio with Parnell and bassist Charlie Silva recorded the album Hall Aboard! the same year, with jazz critic Scott Yanow noting, "[O]ne could be excused for thinking that these performances were led by a veteran player in his fifties...he makes creative use of space (avoiding the pitfall of having his music dominated by youthful energy), and plays with consistent inventiveness within the bebop/hard bop tradition." The magazine Jazz & Blues Florida noted that Hall's approach emphasizes "the importance of entertaining audiences without sacrificing musical quality", and noted among his influences George Shearing, the Modern Jazz Quartet, and The Jazz Messengers. In 2024 he took part in the jazz series Live at Timucua in a group with saxophone player Jeff Rupert, bassist Doug Mathews, and drummer Jamesly Jean-Mary to perform straight-ahead jazz and bossa nova music.
