= James Hall (philosopher) =

American philosopher (born 1933)

James H. Hall (born 1933) is an American philosopher. He was the James Thomas Professor of Philosophy at the University of Richmond from 1965 until his retirement in 2005. He remains at the university as Professor Emeritus. His philosophical interests include: 20th Century analytic philosophy, epistemology, philosophy of religion, and logical empiricism. He has produced two lecture series for The Teaching Company: Philosophy of Religion and Tools of Thinking: Understanding the World Through Experience and Reason.

== Books ==
Some of the books written by James Hall are as follows:

- Illustrated Dictionary Of Symbols In Eastern And Western Art, 1996;
- The Sinister Side. How left-right symbolism shaped Western art, 2008;
- The Self-Portrait. A Cultural History, 2015;
- Accounting Information Systems, March 2018;
- The Industry of Human Happiness, May 2018;
- Dictionary of Subjects and Symbols in Art, 2019;
- With Pen & Ink, 2020;
- Glorieon, 2021;
- The Artist's Studio: A Cultural History – A Times Best Art Book of 2022.
