= Jim Hall (footballer, born 1914) =

English footballer

Personal information
- Full name: James Henry Hall
- Date of birth: 1914
- Place of birth: England
- Height: 5 ft 8 1/2 in (1.74 m)
- Position: Wing half

Senior career*
Years	Team	Apps	(Gls)
1936–1939	Blackpool	26	(1)
- * Club domestic league appearances and goals

James Henry Hall (born 1914, date of death unknown) was an English footballer who played as a wing half. He made 26 appearances in the Football League for Blackpool and scored one league goal.

== Career ==
Hall made his debut for Joe Smith's Tangerines midway through the 1936–37 campaign, in a Christmas Day 3–0 victory at Fulham. He played in a further seven league games before the end of the season, as well as in both of Blackpool's FA Cup ties against Luton Town. The following season, 1937–38, Hall made thirteen league appearances, mainly deputising for George Farrow. He also scored one goal—in a 1–1 draw with Derby County at Bloomfield Road on 2 October. In 1938–39, Hall's final season with Blackpool, he made five League appearances, the final one being in a 2–1 defeat at Arsenal on 10 April.

== Cited texts ==
- Calley, Roy (1992). Blackpool: A Complete Record 1887–1992. Breedon Books Publishing Co Ltd. ISBN 1-873626-07-X.
