= Jim Hall (body artist) =

American body artist with whole-body tattoo

Jim Hall, also known as the Blue Comma, is a retired Baltimore urban planner and body modification artist who has devoted much of his life to transforming his body into an artwork by tattooing his entire body blue and having a variety of body modifications, a process which he started in 1967. As of 2014, he was listed by Guinness World Records as the second most tattooed person in the world.

Hall's body modifications include a variety of piercings and implants, including genital modifications.
