= John L. Marion =

American auctioneer (1933–2026)

- Born: John Louis Marion; November 27, 1933; Gardiner, New York, U.S.
- Died: May 6, 2026 (aged 92); San Diego, California, U.S.
- Education: Fordham University; Columbia University
- Occupation: Auctioneer
- Employer: Sotheby's
- Spouse: Anne Windfohr Marion

John Louis Marion (November 27, 1933 – May 6, 2026) was an American auctioneer and business executive who served as the chairman of Sotheby's from 1975 to 1994. Marion was described by The New York Times as "the country's greatest art auctioneer". Together with his wife, Anne Windfohr Marion, he co-founded the Georgia O'Keeffe Museum in Santa Fe, New Mexico.

== Biography ==
=== Early life and education ===
Marion was born in Gardiner, New York, on November 27, 1933, and grew up in Mount Vernon, New York. His father, Louis J. Marion, married to Florence (Winters) Marion, was the President of Parke-Bernet Galleries. He graduated from Fordham University in New York City in 1956. He then attended Officer Candidate School in Newport, Rhode Island, and served as a lieutenant in the United States Navy. Before naval service, he briefly studied decorative arts at Columbia University.

=== Business career ===
Marion started his career as an auctioneer at Sotheby's in 1960. He became president in 1972 and chairman in 1975. During the course of his career, he oversaw the sale of Irises by Vincent van Gogh for US$53.9 million, Yo Picasso and Au Lapin Agile (both by Pablo Picasso) for US$47.9 million and US$40.7 million respectively, Interchange by Willem de Kooning for US$20.7 million, and False Start and Two Flags (both by Jasper Johns) for US$17 million and US$12.1 million respectively.

In 1989, with Christopher Andersen, he co-wrote The Best of Everything: The Insider's Guide to Collecting--For Every Taste and Every Budget, published by Simon & Schuster. The book suggests anyone can attend auctions and become a collector, even on a limited budget. He retired in 1994 but continued to serve on Sotheby's Advisory Board.

=== Personal life and death ===
From 1960 to 1985, he was married to Mary Anne Crowley. Marion was the fourth husband of philanthropist Anne Windfohr Marion, who died in February 2020. They were married at the Church of the Heavenly Rest on the Upper East Side in Manhattan, New York City, in 1988. Marion died while visiting La Jolla, California on May 6, 2026, at the age of 92.

== Honors ==
The John L. Marion Chair in Art History, Painting, and Sculpture at Fordham University in New York is named in his honor. It was endowed by the Burnett Foundation, where he served on the Board of Trustees. The inaugural Marion Chair position was held by Jo Anna Isaak, a specialist in modern and contemporary art, who was installed in 2009. In 2025, medieval art scholar Nina Rowe has been appointed the Marion Chair.
