= Charles D. Tandy =

American business executive

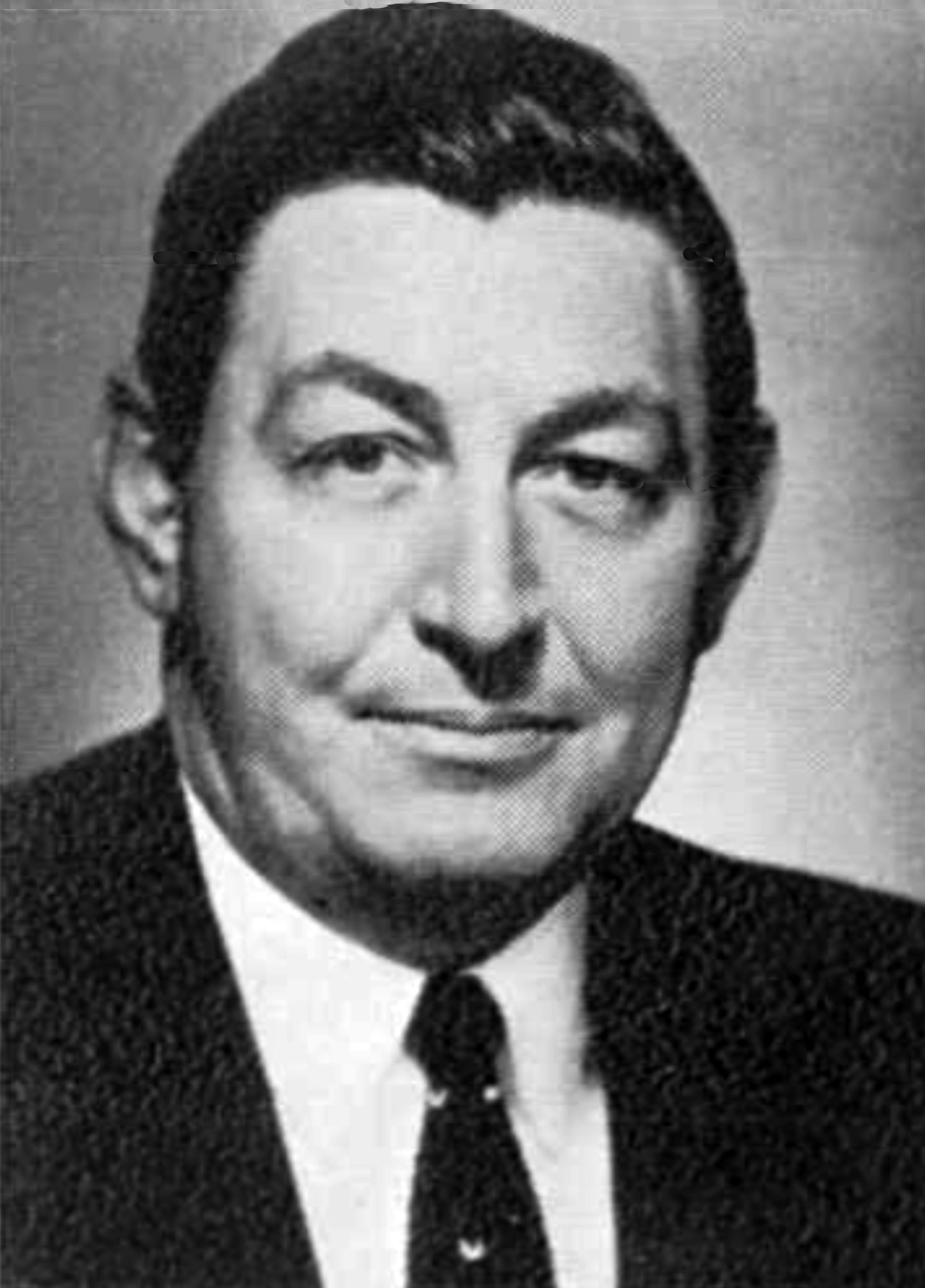
- Born: Charles David Tandy; May 15, 1918; Brownsville, Texas, U.S.
- Died: November 4, 1978 (aged 60); Fort Worth, Texas, U.S.
- Resting place: Greenwood Memorial Park
- Education: Texas Christian University
- Occupation: Businessperson
- Organization: Tandy Corporation
- Spouse(s): Gwen Purdy (Johnston) (?-1966); Anne Valliant Burnett Tandy m. 1969

Charles David Tandy (15 May 1918 – 4 November 1978) was the chairman of the board, president, and chief executive officer of the Tandy Corporation.

== Early life ==
Tandy was the second of three children born to Carmen (née McLain) and David Lewis Tandy in Brownsville, Texas, on May 15, 1918.

In 1935 Tandy graduated from Central High School in Fort Worth, Texas.

== Career ==
Tandy's father co-owned the Hinckley-Tandy Leather Company with his friend Norton Hinckley. Tandy entered his father's business at the age of 12. In 1940 he graduated from Texas Christian University. He then spent some time at the Harvard Business School before joining the US Navy for the remainder of World War II. While in the Navy he set a record for selling war bonds. While a supply officer in the Navy, he noticed sailors being taught knitting and needlepoint as part of recuperative therapy. Thinking that men would prefer leatherwork to needlework, he established a system of craft work for hospitalized service personnel. Its success led him, on leaving the Navy, to set up a mail order business, Tandycraft, that became a major part of his father's business.

Tandy developed his small family leather business into an international corporation. He first turned it into a leather craft company when shoe rationing in World War II almost killed the business, and later expanded into selling leather and tools to make such products as wallets. After a struggle over the company, which saw the Hinckley name dropped, the company was renamed to Tandy Corporation.

In 1963, Tandy acquired the ailing RadioShack, a chain of nine retail stores in the Boston area; the chain grew to more than 400 across the country. Tandy said “We’re not looking for the guy who wants to spend his entire paycheck on a sound system”, rather RadioShack sought customers "looking to save money by buying cheaper goods and improving them through modifications and accessorizing", making it common among "nerds" and "kids aiming to excel at their science fairs".

In Tandy's last years his major project was the revitalization of downtown Fort Worth, his hometown, e.g., the construction of the eight-block Tandy Center. Tandy died of a heart attack in his sleep on 4 November 1978, and was buried at Greenwood Memorial Park in Fort Worth, Texas.

== Awards and recognition ==
- 1976: Business Executive of the Year by Texas Wesleyan University
- 1976: Dateline Award by Fort Worth Advertising Club
- 1976: Spirit of Enterprise Award of the Fort Worth Chamber of Commerce
- 1976: Outstanding Chief Executive Officer of the Year in Merchandising and Services Category by Financial World
- 1983: Texas Legend Inductee by the Texas Business Hall of Fame
- 1991: Academy of Achievement Sales & Marketing Hall of Fame Induction by SMEI
