= James Hall (gospel musician) =

American musician (born 1971)

- Born: James Suggs; October 1, 1971 (age 54); Brooklyn, New York City, US
- Genres: CCM, gospel, traditional black gospel, urban contemporary gospel
- Occupations: Singer, songwriter, organist, music producer
- Instruments: Vocals, singer-songwriter, organ
- Years active: 1994–present
- Labels: Intersound, CGI, Platinum Entertainment, A&M, Compendia, Destiny, Music Blend, Comin Atcha, Entertainment One

James Hall (born James Suggs on October 1, 1971) is an American gospel musician, organist, and music producer. Known as the “Duke of Gospel”. He started his music career, in 1994, with the release of God Is in Control with Intersound Records, and this charted on the Billboard magazine Gospel Albums chart. Hall has released six more albums with various labels that have charted on the Gospel Albums chart, and these were with Worship & Praise, which is the name of his choir he founded. He released an album with Voices of Citadel in 2010, Won't It Be Wonderful, that charted on the Gospel Albums chart.

== Early life ==
Hall was born James Suggs on October 1, 1971, in Brooklyn, New York, the youngest of eight siblings. He began singing at age five. He formed the choir Worship & Praise while he was in secondary school.

== Music career ==
In 1987, he founded Worship & Praise, (WAP) his own gospel singing ensemble. In 1992, the opportunity to perform a five minute spot on TV’s Bobby Jones Gospel came. It was just the break they had been looking for, as earlier that year WAP recorded their first project on the Tehilah Records label.

His music recording career began in 1994, with the release of two albums by Intersound Records, God Is in Control and King of Glory (1995), and those both placed on the Billboard magazine Gospel Albums chart at No. 10 and No. 12. The third album, According to James Hall, Chapter 3, was released on July 15, 1997 by CGI Records, and this placed at No. 8 on the aforementioned chart. He released, Live from New York at Lincoln Center, on July 7, 1998 by Platinum Entertainment, and this charted at No. 10 on the Gospel Albums chart. The next two albums, Messiah in 1998 released by A&M Records and 1999's We Celebrate Christmas with James Hall released by Compendia Music Group, yet they failed to chart. His next album, We Are at War, was released by Destiny Records on May 8, 2001, and this placed upon three Billboard magazine charts, the Gospel Albums at No. 7, Independent Albums at No. 24, and No. 39 on the Heatseekers Albums charts. On August 8, 2006, he released Voices of Citadel on his own label Music Blend Records, however it did not chart. The subsequent album, Live at Foxwoods, was released by Comin Atcha Music, Inc. on October 2, 2007, and this charted on the Gospel Albums at No. 19. While his next release was with Voices of Citadel, Won't It Be Wonderful, which this was released in 2010 by Music Blend, and this time around it charted on the Gospel Albums at No. 5, while it placed at No. 46 on the Heatseekers Albums. The album, Trip Down Memory Lane, was released in 2012 by Entertainment One Music, and it placed upon two Billboard charts, the Gospel Albums at No. 6 and No. 49 on the Independent Albums chart.

== Discography ==
With Worship & Praise

List of selected studio albums, with selected chart positions
| Title | Album details | Peak chart positions | | |
| Title | Album details | US Gos | US Indie | US Heat |
|---|---|---|---|---|
| God Is in Control | Released: 1994; Label: Intersound; CD, digital download | 10 | – | – |
| King of Glory | Released: 1995; Label: Intersound; CD, digital download | 12 | – | – |
| According to James Hall, Chapter 3 | Released: 1997; Label: CGI; CD, digital download | 8 | – | – |
| Live from New York at Lincoln Center | Released: 1998; Label: Platinum Entertainment; CD, digital download | 10 | – | – |
| We Are at War | Released: 2001; Label: Destiny; CD, digital download | 7 | 24 | 39 |
| Live at Foxwoods | Released: 2007; Label: Comin Atcha; CD, digital download | 19 | – | – |
| Trip Down Memory Lane | Released: 2012; Label: Entertainment One; CD, digital download | 6 | 49 | – |
| New Era | Released: October 30, 2015; Label: Entertainment One; CD, digital download | 2 | 23 | – |

With Voices of Citadel

List of selected studio albums, with selected chart positions
| Title | Album details | Peak chart positions | |
| Title | Album details | US Gos | US Heat |
|---|---|---|---|
| Won't It Be Wonderful | Released: 2010; Label: Music Blend; CD, digital download | 5 | 46 |
