= Special Effort =

Quarter Horse racehorse and sire

- Breed: American Quarter Horse
- Discipline: Racing
- Sire: Raise Your Glass (TB)
- Grandsire: Raise A Native (TB)
- Dam: Go Effortlessly
- Maternal grandsire: Double Devil
- Sex: Stallion
- Foaled: April 9, 1979
- Country: United States
- Color: Sorrel
- Breeder: Allen and Jeanette Moehrig
- Owner: Dan and Jolene Urschel

Record
- 14-13-0-1

Earnings
- $1,219,949.00

Major wins
- 1981 Kansas Futurity; 1981 Rainbow Futurity; 1981 All American Futurity; 1982 Kansas Derby

Awards
- 1981 Champion 2 year-old, Champion 2 year-old coltAmerican Quarter Horse Association (AQHA) World Champion Quarter Running Horse. 1982 Champion 3 year-old colt.

Honors
- American Quarter Horse Hall of Fame
- Last updated on: March 3, 2008.

Special Effort (April 9, 1979 – March 11, 2006) was an American Quarter Horse stallion who won the 1981 All American Futurity. He was inducted into the American Quarter Horse Association's (or AQHA) Hall of Fame in 2008.

== Life ==
Special Effort was foaled in 1979 and was bred by Allen and Jeanette Moehrig of Seguin, Texas. He was bought in 1981 by Dan and Jolene Urschel for $1,000,000. He won the 1981 Kansas Futurity, Rainbow Futurity and the All American Futurity to become a Triple Crown winner. Trained by Johnnie Goodman. In 1982, he won the Kansas Derby and was undefeated 13 for 13 going into the All American Derby, but finished third. He retired from the racetrack to become a sire of racehorses. He died in March 2006. He was syndicated in 1981 for $15 million.

== Pedigree ==
Polynesian (TB)
Native Dancer (TB)
Geisha (TB)
Raise A Native (TB)
Case Ace (TB)
Raise You (TB)
Lady Glory (TB)
Raise Your Glass (TB)
Polynesian (TB)
Barbizon (TB)
Good Blood (TB)
Champagne Woman (TB)
Never Say Die (TB)
L'Amour Toujours (TB)
Idle Lovliness (TB)
Special Effort
Double Feature (TB)
Double Bid
Paula Thomasina
Double Devil
Spotted Bull (TB)
Bella St Mary
Dolly Mack
Go Effortlessly
Bull Dog (TB)
Spotted Bull (TB)
Spotted Beauty (TB)
Hijo Beauty (TB)
Hijo Manso (TB)
Hijo Lanty (TB)
Sky Lanty (TB)
