= Streakin Six =

Quarter Horse racehorse and sire

- Breed: American Quarter Horse
- Sire: Easy Six
- Dam: Miss Assured
- Maternal grandsire: Little Request (TB)
- Sex: Stallion
- Foaled: 1977
- Country: United States
- Color: Chestnut
- Breeder: Tom L. Burnett Cattle Company

Record
- 19 starts: 10-5-1

Awards
- 1979 Rainbow Futurity

Honors
- American Quarter Horse Hall of Fame

Streakin Six (1977–2005) was an American Quarter Horse stallion and a famous racehorse as well as a breeding stallion. He was inducted into the American Quarter Horse Hall of Fame in 2011.

== Life ==
Streakin Six was a 1977 stallion bred by the Tom L. Burnett Cattle Company of Fort Worth, Texas. Sired by Easy Six, Streakin Six was out of Miss Assured, a daughter of the Thoroughbred stallion Little Request.

== Racing career ==
During Streakin Six's racing career, he won the 1979 Rainbow Futurity, a graded stakes race, and was second in the 1979 All American Futurity, another graded stakes race. His record on the racetrack was 19 starts, 10 wins, 5 seconds and a third-place finish.

== Death and honors ==
Streakin Six died in December 2005. He was inducted into the AQHA Hall of Fame in 2011.

== Pedigree ==
Easy Jet
Easy Six
Streakin Six
Little Request (TB)
Miss Assured
