= 6666 Ranch =

Ranch in King County, Texas

Coordinates: 33°37′28″N 100°19′40″W

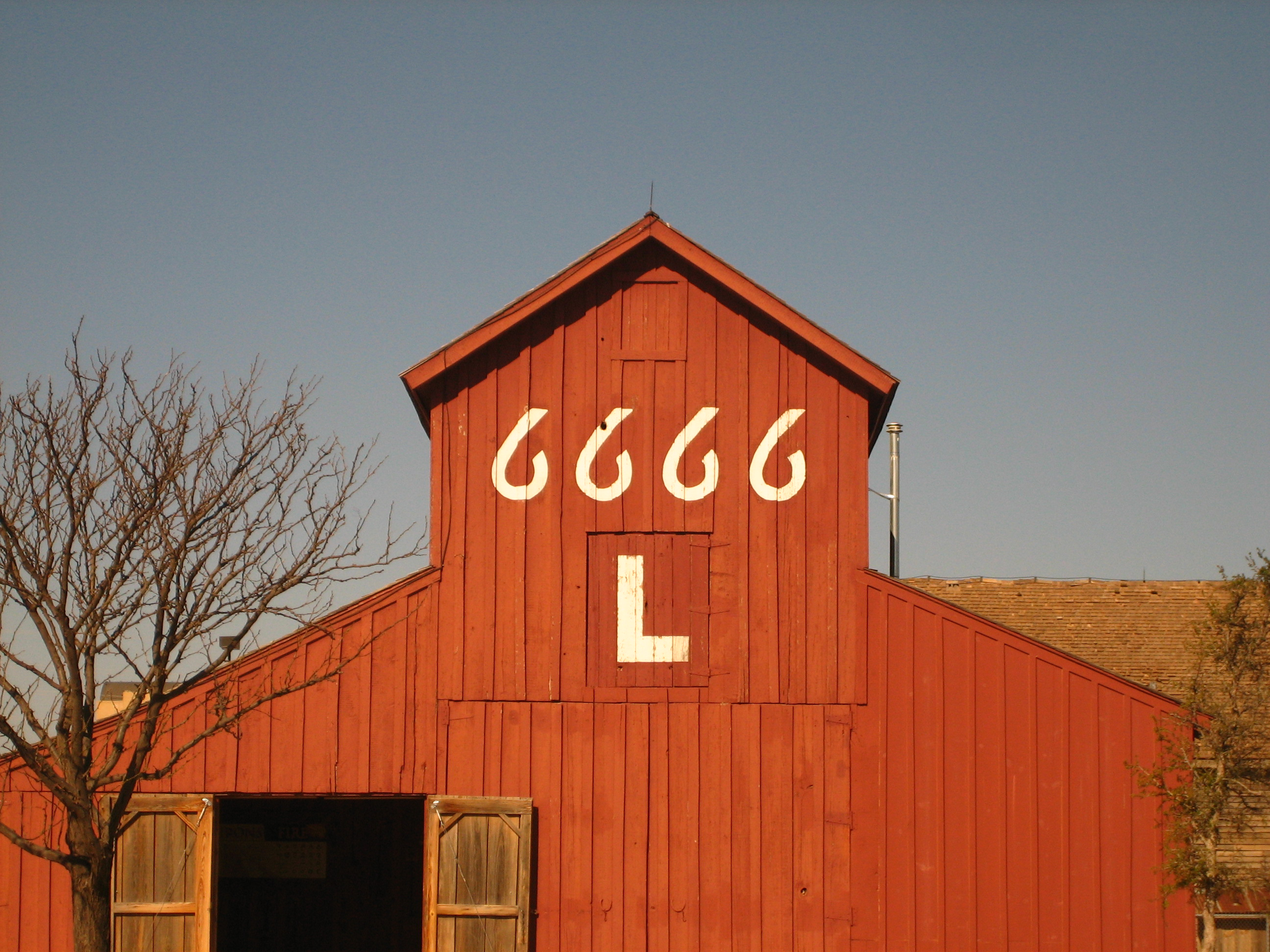
Red barn from the 6666 Ranch at the National Ranching Heritage Center in Lubbock, Texas

The Four Sixes Ranch, stylized as 6666 Ranch, is a ranch in King County, Texas, as well as Carson County and Hutchinson County.

== Location ==
The main section of the ranch is located near the town of Guthrie in King County, Texas. It spans 350,000 acres (550 sq mi; 1,400 km^{2}) of land. The main ranch house is off U.S. Highway 82. The Dixon Creek section spans 108,000 acres (169 sq mi; 440 km^{2}) of land in Carson and Hutchinson counties. Dixon Creek runs through this section of the ranch near Panhandle, Texas.

== History ==
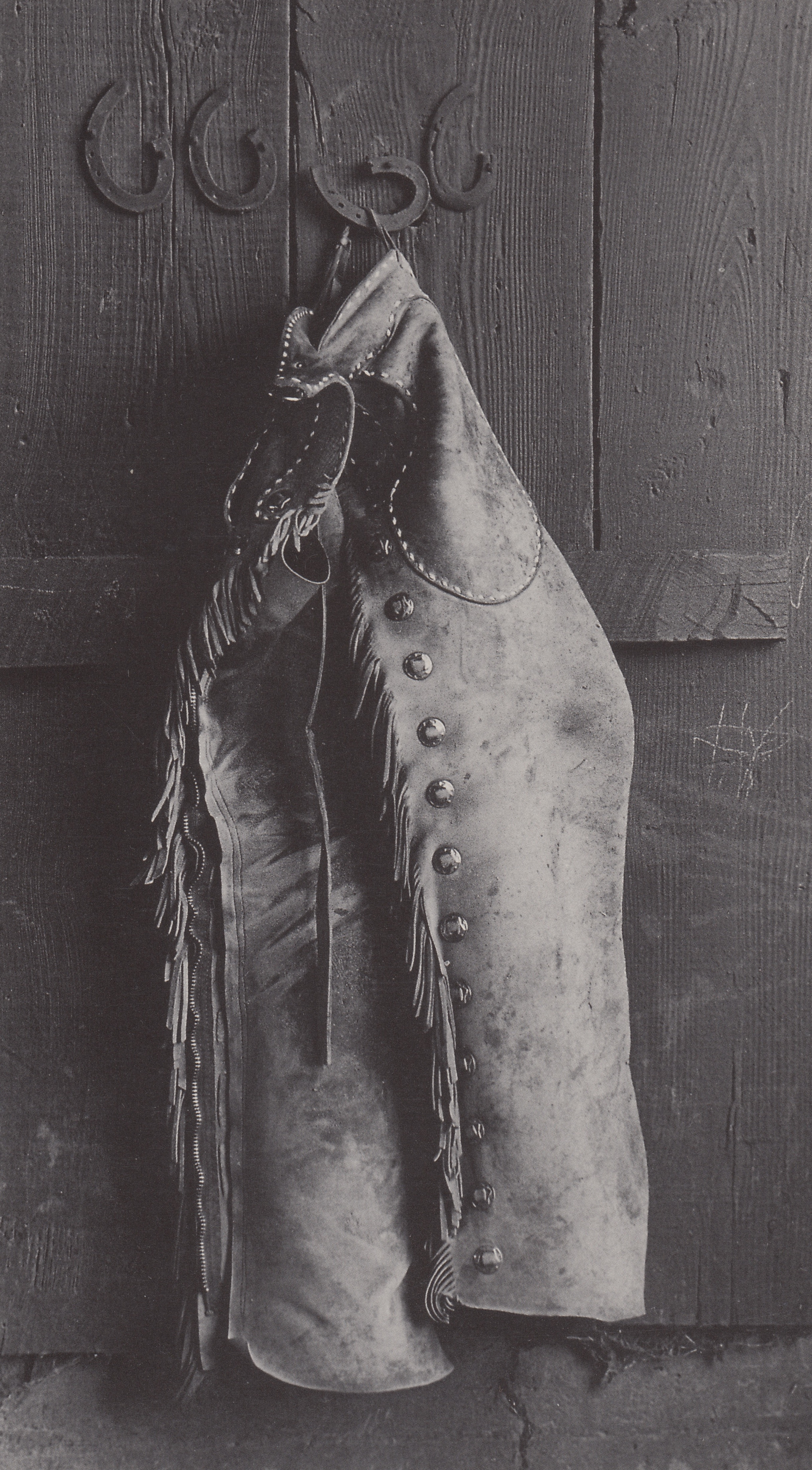
A pair of chaps hanging from the ranch's "6666" insignia

In 1900, Samuel Burk Burnett established the ranch after he purchased the land from the Louisville Land and Cattle Company. Legend has it that he won the ranch from a card game, where he scored four sixes. However, Burnett and his descendants have denied this folklore tale. Instead, the name comes from the first herd he raised on the ranch, which was branded "6666".

Burnett raised purebred Herefords and Durham bulls, which won national prizes at livestock shows all over the United States. He also bred purebred quarter horses. In 1918, 2,000 head of cattle were killed by a blizzard. Three years later, in 1921, oil was found on the ranch, thus turning it into a very profitable enterprise.

After Burnett's death in 1922, the ranch was inherited by his granddaughter, Anne Valliant Burnett Tandy. She purchased Grey Badger II and Hollywood Gold, two show horses which lived on the ranch. By 1936, there were 20,000 Hereford cattle on the ranch. In the 1960s and 1970s, the barn on the ranch was used in advertisements for Marlboro, the cigarette brand. In 1975, scenes of the movie Mackintosh and T.J. were filmed on the ranch.

In 1980, the ranch was passed on to Burnett's great-granddaughter, Anne Windfohr Marion, and his great-great-granddaughter, Wendi Grimes. Marion co-managed the ranch with her fourth husband, John L. Marion. They bred Brangus cattle with Herefords to produce the Black Baldy, a cattle breed resistant to cedar flies. A hundred broodmares are bred on the ranch every year.

As of 3 December 2020, the ranch was being sold in accordance with the will of owner Anne Burnett Marion, who had died in February that year; it was listed on the market for a total of $347.7 million. In May 2021, a buyer group represented by screenwriter Taylor Sheridan purchased the ranch.

Paintings depicting portions of the ranch have been painted by Tom Ryan and Mondel Rogers. A barn from the ranch has been moved to the National Ranching Heritage Center in Lubbock, Texas.

== In popular culture ==
An unnamed television series based on the ranch was introduced as a backdoor pilot, during the fourth season of the drama series Yellowstone, released November 7, 2021, via the Paramount+ streaming service. Signs of the ranch can also be spotted in the drama series Landman.
