= Westover Hills, Texas =

Town of Westover Hills, Texas
- Town
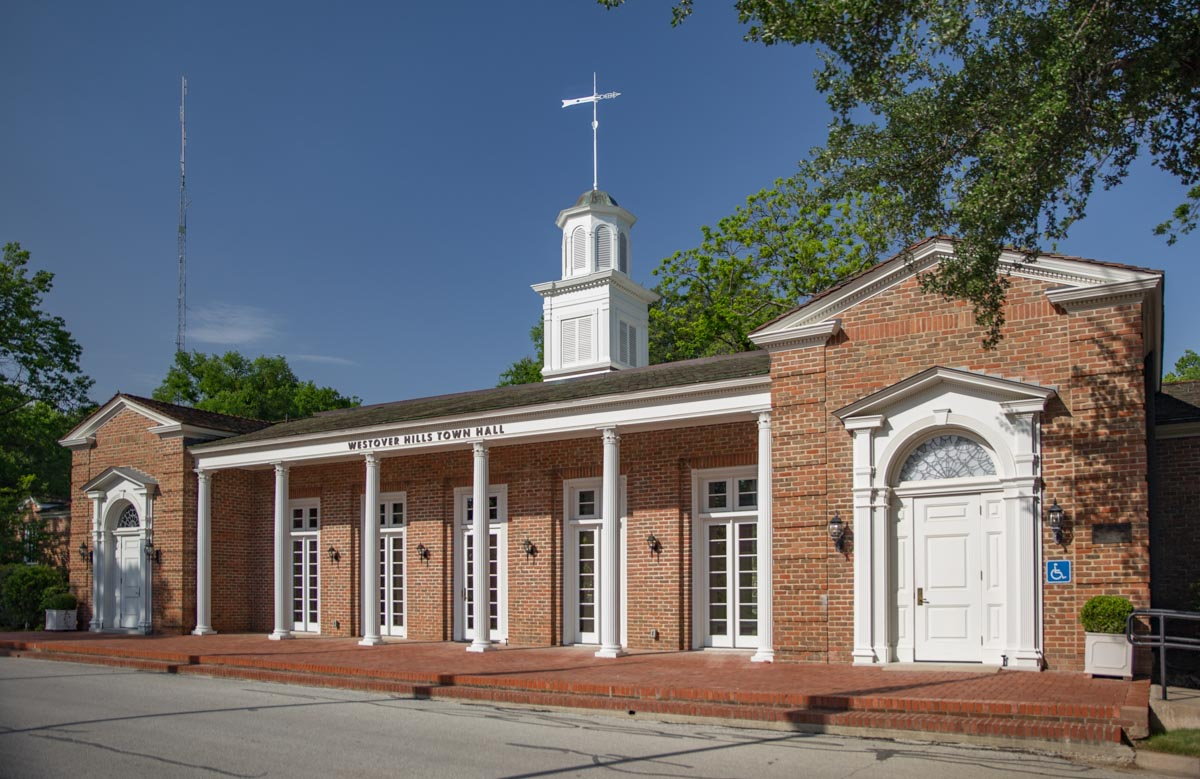
- Westover Hills Town Hall

- Location of Westover Hills in Tarrant County, Texas
- Coordinates: 32°44′50″N 97°24′52″W
- Country: United States
- State: Texas
- County: Tarrant

Area
  - Total: 0.71 sq mi (1.84 km^{2})
  - Land: 0.71 sq mi (1.84 km^{2})
  - Water: 0 sq mi (0.00 km^{2})
- Elevation: 607 ft (185 m)

Population (2020)
  - Total: 641
  - Density: 902/sq mi (348/km^{2})
- Time zone: UTC-6 (CST)
  - Summer (DST): UTC-5 (CDT)
- ZIP code: 76107
- Area code: 817
- FIPS code: 48-77788
- GNIS feature ID: 2413473
- Website: http://westoverhills.us/

Westover Hills is a town in Tarrant County, Texas, United States. The population was 641 at the 2020 census.

In 2000, Westover Hills was the wealthiest location in Texas by per capita income and the 12th highest-income place in the United States. It has since been surpassed in Texas by both Piney Point Village and Barton Creek. It is still the wealthiest suburb of Fort Worth.

== Geography ==
According to the United States Census Bureau, the town has a total area of 0.7 square mile (1.8 km^{2}), all land.

== Demographics ==
Historical population
| Census | Pop. | Note | %± |
|---|---|---|---|
| 1940 | 197 | | — |
| 1950 | 266 | | 35.0% |
| 1960 | 307 | | 15.4% |
| 1970 | 374 | | 21.8% |
| 1980 | 671 | | 79.4% |
| 1990 | 672 | | 0.1% |
| 2000 | 658 | | −2.1% |
| 2010 | 682 | | 3.6% |
| 2020 | 641 | | −6.0% |
U.S. Decennial Census

Westover Hills racial composition as of 2020 (NH = Non-Hispanic) (Note: Note: the US Census treats Hispanic/Latino as an ethnic category. This table excludes Latinos from the racial categories and assigns them to a separate category. Hispanics/Latinos can be of any race.)
| Race | Number | Percentage |
|---|---|---|
| White (NH) | 601 | 93.76% |
| Native American or Alaska Native (NH) | 1 | 0.16% |
| Asian (NH) | 9 | 1.4% |
| Some other race (NH) | 4 | 0.62% |
| Mixed/multi-racial (NH) | 12 | 1.87% |
| Hispanic or Latino | 14 | 2.18% |
| Total | 641 | |

As of the 2020 United States census, there were 641 people, 300 households, and 247 families residing in the town.

== Politics ==
The city of Westover Hills is one of the most reliably Republican jurisdictions in the state of Texas. Every GOP presidential candidate since Thomas Dewey in 1948 has carried the city by over 25 points, with Dwight Eisenhower, Ronald Reagan, and George H. W. Bush each earning over 90% of the vote in 1952, 1956, 1984 and 1988 respectively. In his 1998 gubernatorial re-election bid, George W. Bush would also top 90% Among the Democratic candidates for president, only Lyndon Johnson in 1964 has ever come within 30 points of carrying Westover Hills.

In 1944, Franklin Delano Roosevelt finished third in the city, behind Dewey, and the unpledged Texas Regulars third party, who won the city with over three quarters of the vote.

All presidential election results for Westover Hills since 1944, and all gubernatorial results since 1998 are listed below:

Westover Hills city vote by party in presidential elections
| Year | Democratic | Republican | Third parties |
|---|---|---|---|
| 2024 | 19.58% 93 | 79.58% 378 | 0.84% 4 |
| 2020 | 23.27% 118 | 76.73% 389 | 0.00% 0 |
| 2016 | 17.94% 87 | 78.56% 381 | 3.50% 17 |
| 2012 | 14.20% 71 | 85.20% 426 | 0.60% 3 |
| 2008 | 21.51% 108 | 78.09% 392 | 0.40% 2 |
| 2004 | 16.77% 84 | 81.64% 409 | 1.60% 8 |
| 2000 | 11.52% 56 | 86.42% 420 | 2.06% 10 |
| 1996 | 13.42% 62 | 84.85% 392 | 1.73% 8 |
| 1992 | 8.79% 32 | 81.87% 298 | 9.34% 34 |
| 1988 | 6.07% 21 | 93.93% 325 | 0.00% 0 |
| 1984 | 5.68% 20 | 94.32% 332 | 0.00% 0 |
| 1980 | 25.45% 439 | 71.42% 1,232 | 3.13% 54 |
| 1976 | 31.74% 510 | 67.89% 1,091 | 0.37% 6 |
| 1972 | 18.12% 531 | 81.88% 2,399 | 0.00% 0 |
| 1968 | 20.13% 93 | 73.59% 340 | 6.28% 29 |
| 1964 | 35.78% 122 | 64.22% 219 | 0.00% 0 |
| 1960 | 21.74% 45 | 78.26% 162 | 0.00% 0 |
| 1956 | 1.52% 2 | 93.62% 132 | 5.30% 7 |
| 1952 | 5.93% 8 | 94.07% 127 | 0.00% 0 |
| 1948 | 5.00% 5 | 84.00% 84 | 11.00% 11 |
| 1944 | 9.57% 9 | 11.70% 11 | 78.72% 74 |

Westover Hills city vote by party in gubernatorial elections
| Year | Democratic | Republican | Third parties |
|---|---|---|---|
| 2022 | 20.14% 84 | 78.90% 329 | 0.96% 4 |
| 2018 | 16.30% 75 | 83.26% 383 | 0.43% 2 |
| 2014 | 15.17% 61 | 84.08% 338 | 0.75% 3 |
| 2010 | 23.02% 93 | 76.73% 310 | 0.25% 1 |
| 2006 | 15.54% 62 | 62.41% 249 | 22.06% 88 |
| 2002 | 19.95% 85 | 79.34% 338 | 0.71% 3 |
| 1998 | 7.68% 28 | 92.34% 337 | 0.00% 0 |

== Education ==
Westover Hills is in the Fort Worth Independent School District.

Westover Hills is served by:

- Mary Louise Phillips Elementary School
  - Phillips was built in 1949. It was named after Mary Louise Phillips, the first female board member of FWISD.
- Monnig Middle School
- Arlington Heights High School

However, most families choose to send their children to private schools, typically Fort Worth Country Day School, but also All Saints' Episcopal School and Trinity Valley School, all three of which participate in the Southwestern Preparatory Conference.
