= History of East Texas State Normal College =

Early history of Texas A&M University–Commerce

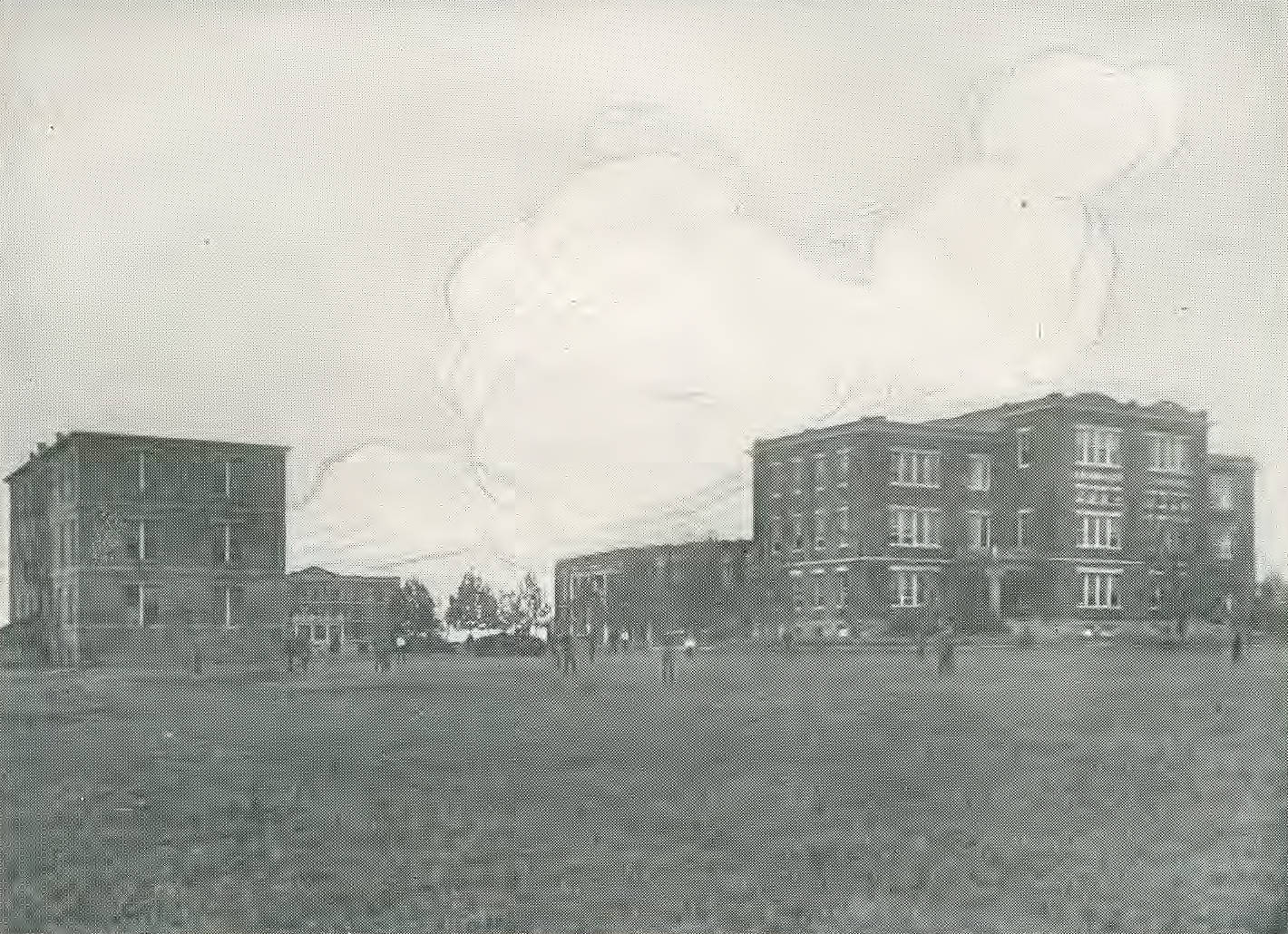
A panorama of the East Texas State Normal College campus in 1921

The history of East Texas State Normal College (ETSNC) comprises the history of the university now known as East Texas A&M University from when it was acquired by the State of Texas in 1917, to when it was renamed East Texas State Teachers College in 1923. In the context of the college's significant institutional debt, a pressing need for repairs to campus facilities, and American entry into World War I, Randolph B. Binnion, the Assistant State Superintendent of Public Instruction, was selected as its second president in July 1917. Among Binnion's first accomplishments in office were enlarging the faculty and repairing the physical plant. Despite having an enrollment of just 234 when it reopened as a public school in 1917, by 1922 ETSNC was the second best attended normal college in the state.

The late 1910s and early 1920s were an era of marked conservatism at ETSNC, as all prospective faculty members were asked whether they danced or belonged to a church, while the school viewed itself as a surrogate parent for students in line with the principle of in loco parentis. Nonetheless, student life developed during this period, which saw the formation of student government in addition to ample opportunities for students to attend lectures and concerts as well as participate in extracurricular organizations. ETSNC also became known for its low costs as its reputation for quality grew, exemplified by the fact that the Cleveland, Ohio, school board offered to hire its "entire output of teachers" in 1920.

== State acquisition and investment ==
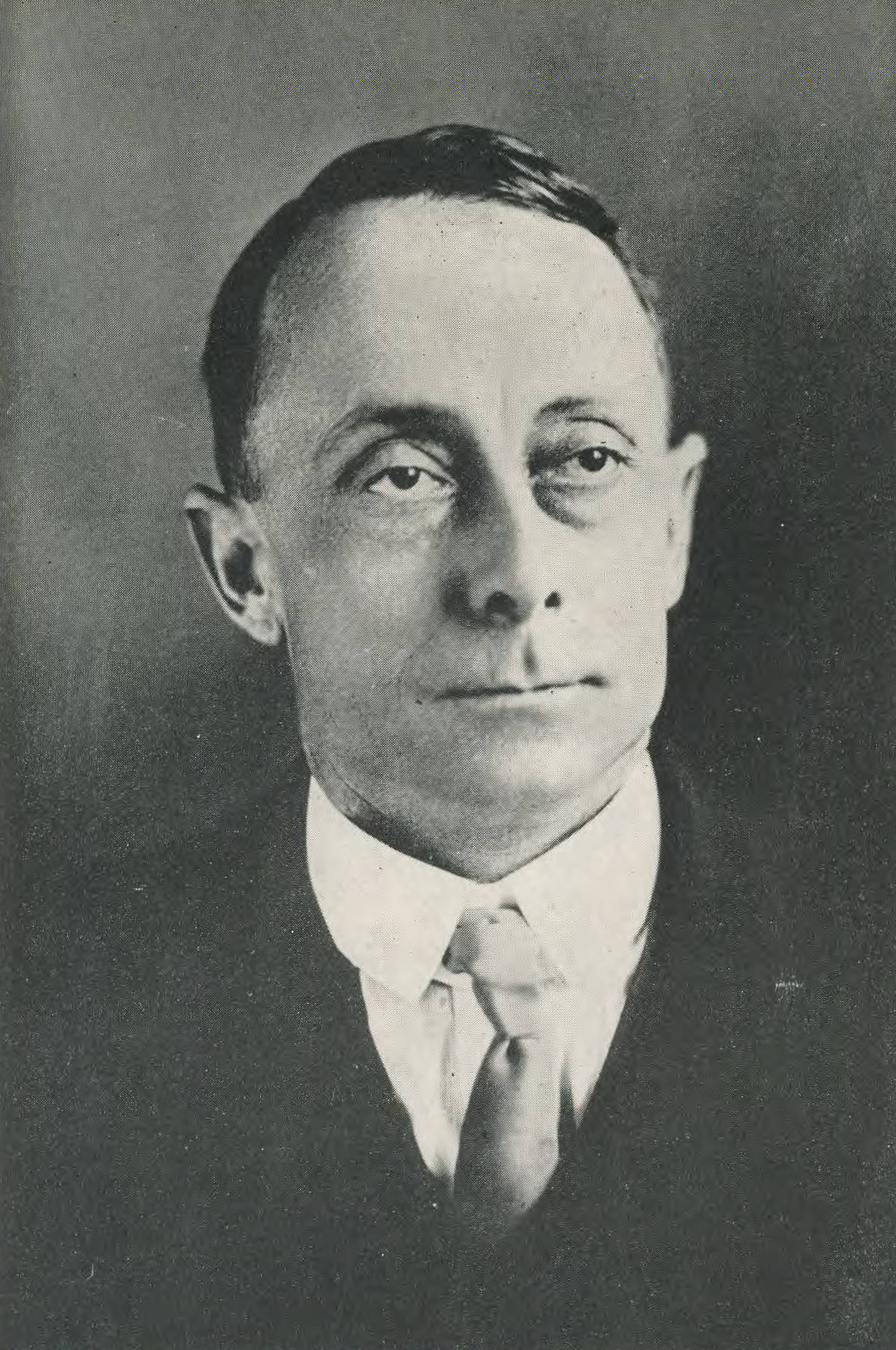
President Randolph B. Binnion in 1920

East Texas Normal College (ETNC) was renamed East Texas State Normal College (ETSNC) in 1917 after it was acquired by the State of Texas and transformed into a public college. Aside from acquiring ETSNC, that year the Texas Legislature also authorized the establishment of three other state normal schools: Stephen F. Austin Normal College in Nacogdoches, South Texas Normal College in Kingsville, and Sul Ross Normal College in Alpine. However, by 1918, all three of these schools had seen their openings delayed. The State Normal School Board of Regents exercised control over both ETSNC's staff and physical plant from September 1917, as the state came to legally treat the college the same way it treated the other "State Normals".

Against the backdrop of significant institutional debt (estimated at $15,000), a pressing need for repairs to campus facilities (to cost in excess of $40,000), and American entry into World War I, the Board of Regents selected Randolph B. Binnion, the Assistant State Superintendent of Public Instruction, as the college's second president in July 1917. Binnion was a native of Biardstown who had attended the Sam Houston Normal Institute, the University of Texas at Austin, George Peabody College for Teachers, and New York University as well as worked as a teacher and superintendent in Lamar County before being named Assistant State Superintendent of Public Instruction in 1913.

In August 1917, Commerce donated $40,000 to the state treasurer's office to enable the necessary repairs on campus. In addition to the appropriation that it had made for the purchase of the college's physical plant, the state legislature committed $88,860 in appropriations to it for 1917–18 and another $88,860 for 1918–19. This total of a two-year $177,720 appropriation for ETSNC compared to the $1,100,674 shared by the other four "State Normals" in existence at the time (North Texas Normal College, Sam Houston Normal Institute, Southwest Texas State Normal School, and West Texas Normal College). Despite the relatively substantial state funding, Binnion demonstrated a fondness for sending unspent public funds back to the state government.

== Growth and change ==
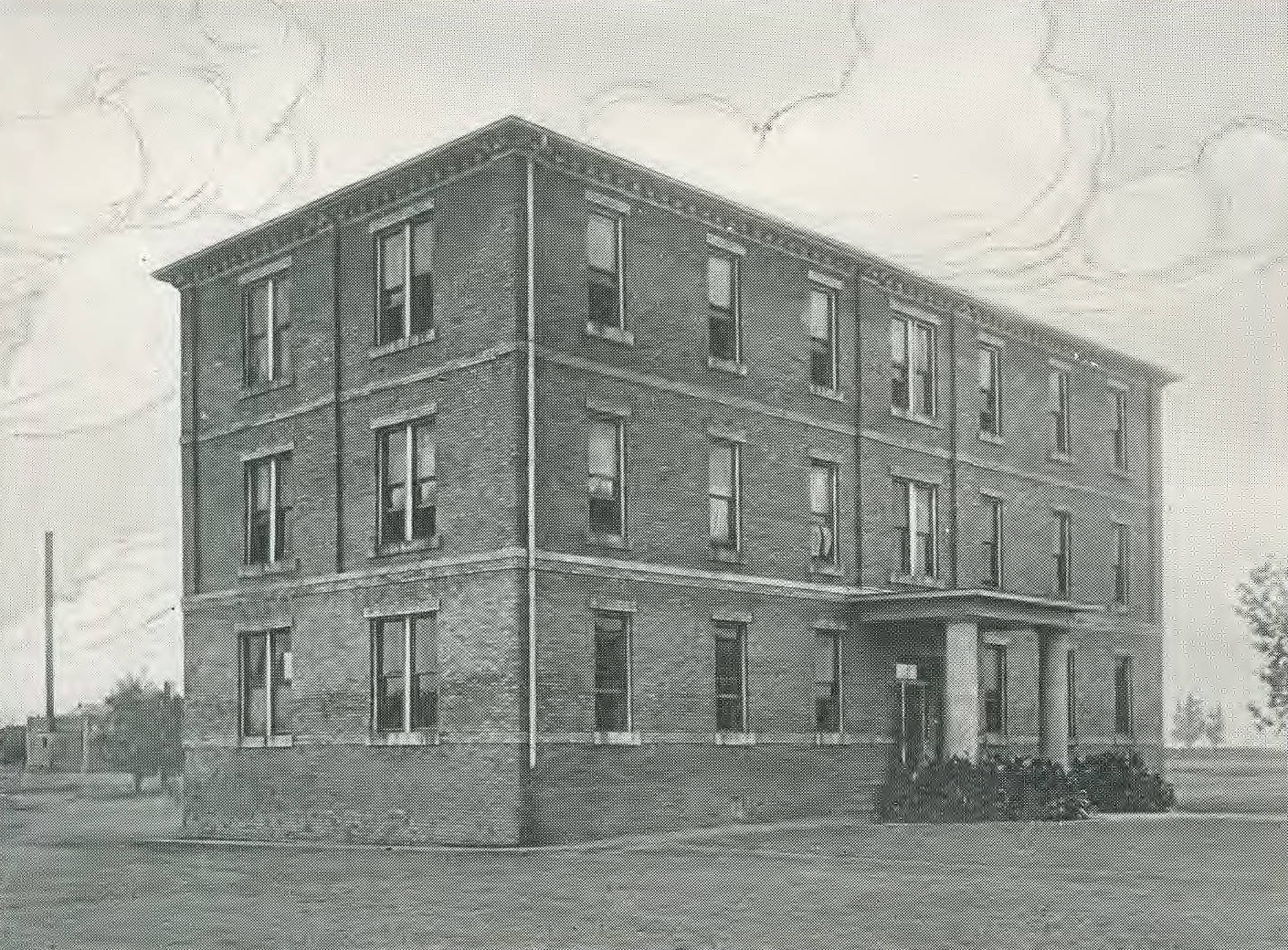
Science Hall in 1921

Among Binnion's first accomplishments in office were enlarging the faculty and repairing the physical plant: in his first year, he more than doubled the number of professors on campus by hiring 18 new faculty members, and under his watch the Administration Building, Science Hall, and Willard Hall were all renovated or remodeled. In 1918, salaries for ETSNC employees ranged from $1,500 for instructors to $4,000 for the president.

On October 16, 1917, ETSNC was officially reopened as a state school, and Binnion was officially installed as its second president. On that day, enrollment was just 234, compared to over 3,000 two years before while William L. Mayo was president; however, the number of enrolled students climbed steadily over the next few years, reaching 2,177 in 1921–22. By 1922, ETSNC was the second best attended normal college in the state, surpassed only by North Texas State Normal College in Denton. According to William E. Sawyer, the college's entrance requirements were quite clear in 1917: "Any white person who is sixteen years of age on or before January 1 of the school year may enter a State Normal School". In spring 1919, there were only eight out-of-state students enrolled at ETNC: three from Arkansas, two from Oklahoma, and one each from Kentucky, Mississippi, and New Mexico.

Binnion brought a conservative attitude to the process of selecting faculty, as he always asked candidates whether they danced and whether they belonged to a church. He explained: "I request my teachers not to dance in the town of Commerce. It is not obligatory that teachers belong to any church, but frankly, I prefer young men and women of Christ-like character for this work". In 1921, Binnion noted that 43 of the school's 44 faculty members were affiliated with a church.

In the late 1910s, state normal colleges in Texas were not permitted to have on-campus dormitories, so the burden of accommodating students fell largely to Commerce citizens who were willing to host boarders. In 1920, Binnion commented that "[t]he most serious drawback in this town is finding a place to live". However, that year ETSNC and the other state normal colleges pressured the board of regents to permit dormitories, largely to accommodate growth at the schools. This allowed ETSNC to renovate the West Dormitory to house female students, which reopened in 1922, and re-purpose Willard Hall as a classroom and administrative building that was renamed Industrial Hall. However, according to William E. Sawyer, overcrowded conditions at the college persisted into 1923.

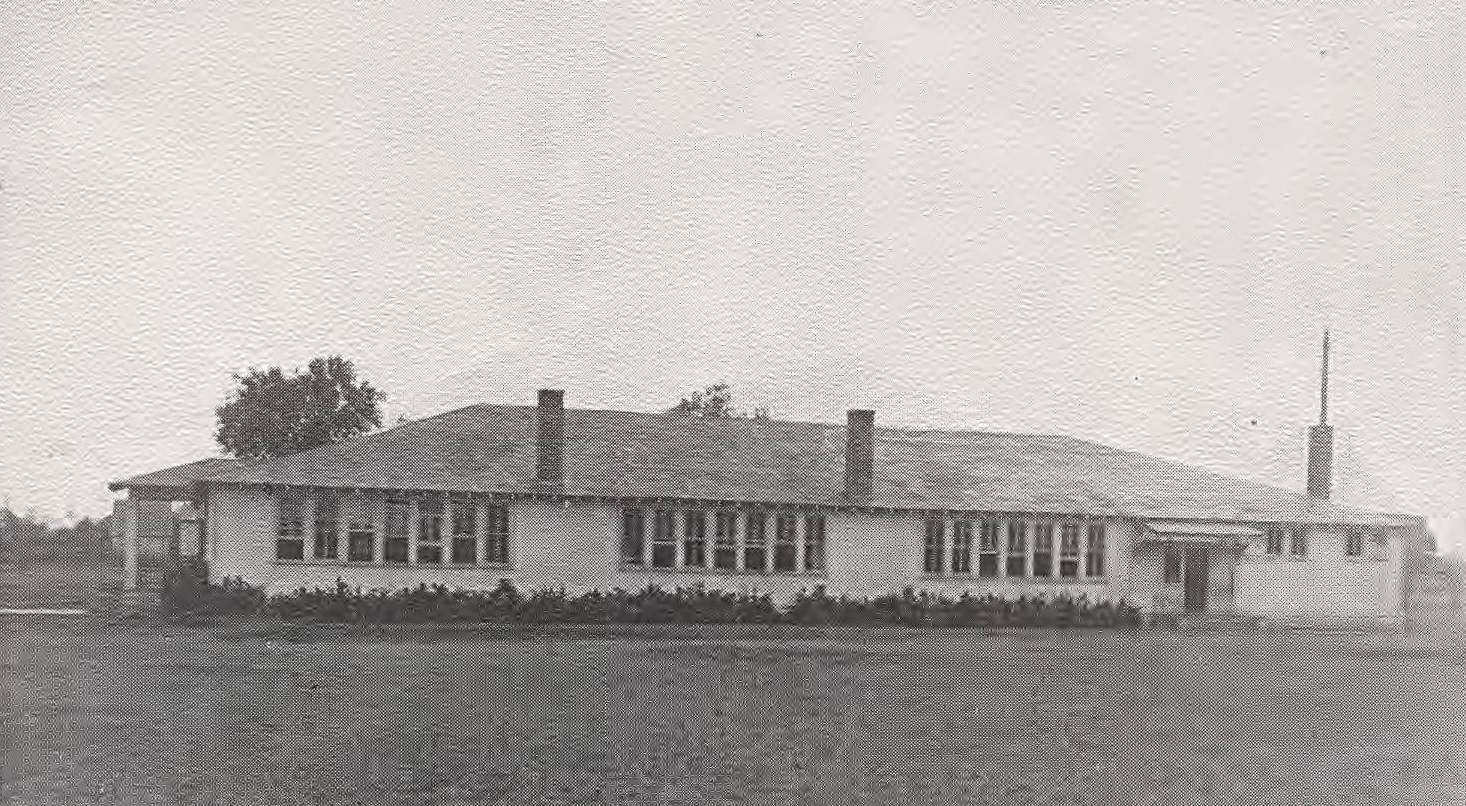
The Training School, nicknamed the "dairy barn", in 1922

Due to the poor condition of the economy of Texas after World War I, caused largely by an agricultural depression, state funding for higher education suffered. In 1921, the school failed to make some of its salary payments to staff on time. The problem of renovating the decaying campus on a shoestring budget led to some temporary solutions, including buildings constructed with scrap materials and lacking either central heating or electric lights that were derisively referred to as the "dairy barn" (which housed the Training School) and the "shack". Despite sub-par facilities, ETSNC's enrollment continued to grow during the 1920s, largely thanks to its low costs: it charged no tuition, most textbooks were free, and it only required students to pay a $15 fee for "all privileges" (including access to the library and laboratory) and a $1 "diploma fee" upon graduating. In 1917, room and board costs had ranged from $18 to $20 per month.

Although Binnion generally adhered to the same principles regarding teacher education that Mayo did, ETSNC's conversion into a state school brought inevitable and extensive changes. The college was reorganized into four separate program "divisions": a training school (which taught local children in the first nine grades and trained teaching students), a normal school division (a two-year program equivalent to a secondary school education that also offered a temporary teaching certificate), a diploma division (a two-year program resulting in the equivalent of an Associate of Arts degree and a permanent teaching certificate), and a degree division (a four-year, college-level program resulting in either a Bachelor of Science or Bachelor of Arts degree). The retirement of the "sub-college" program that dated back to Mayo, along with new state requirements more generally, resulted in students who had not finished high school having more difficulty gaining admittance to ETSNC, which disproportionately affected rural students. The school's growth during this period began to bring it some national attention, exemplified when the Cleveland, Ohio, school board offered to hire its "entire output of teachers" in 1920.

== Athletics ==
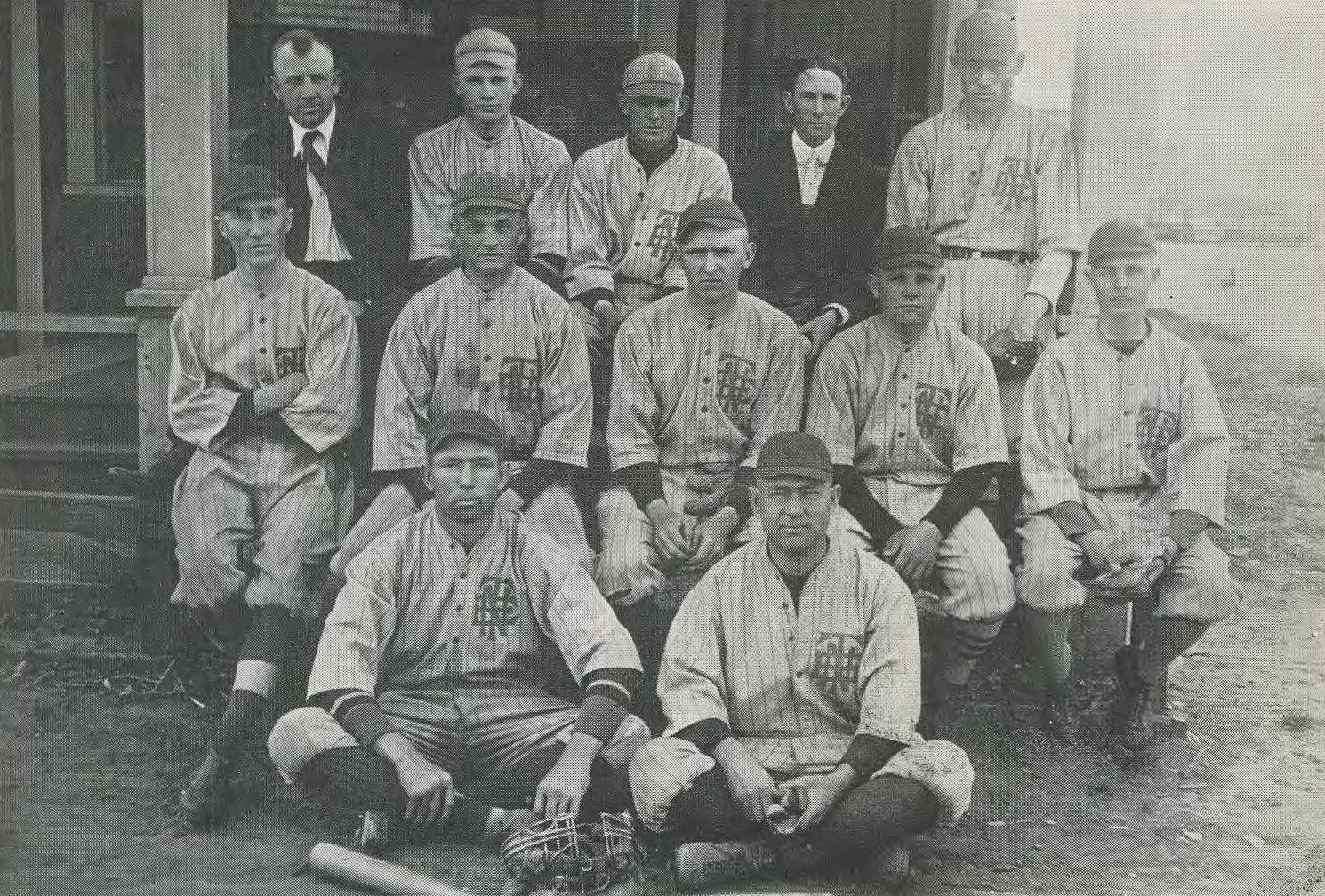
The 1920 East Texas State Lions baseball team

Unlike Mayo, Binnion was a consistent and strong supporter of the college's athletics program. By the time ETSNC became a state institution in 1917, blue and gold had been adopted as its school colors, and in 1919 its teams began using the nickname "Lions". Roy Owens of Tyler, who played on early intercollegiate teams, suggested that it was a pun on Mayo's middle name, Leonidas. During the late 1910s and 1920s, ETSNC fielded teams in football, men's basketball, women's basketball, and baseball, while the school gained admission into the Texas Intercollegiate Athletic Association in 1922. In early 1921, the baseball team played the Chicago White Sox in a spring training game, losing by a score of 12 to 3.

== Student life ==
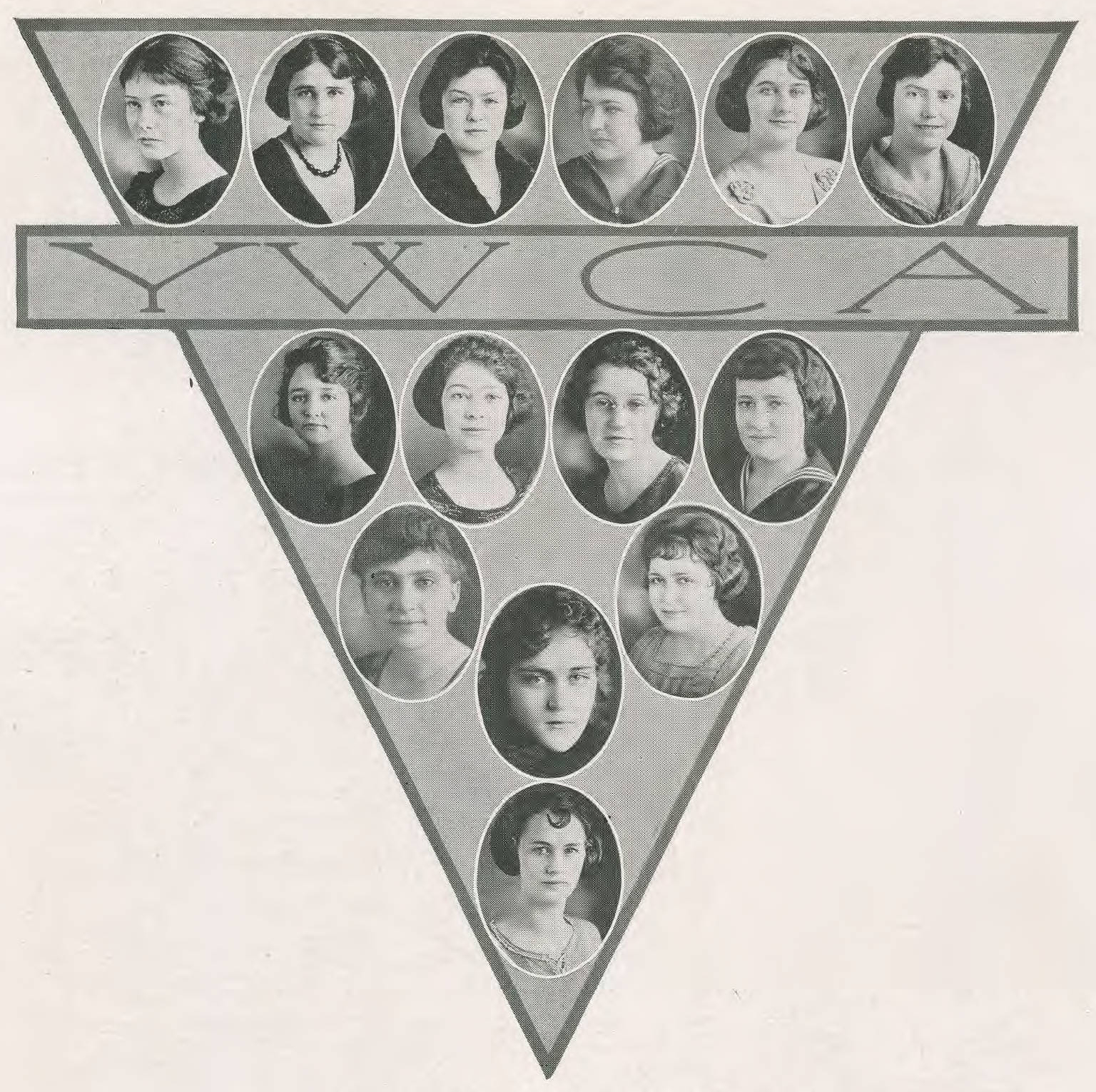
The 1922 YWCA Cabinet at ETSNC

In September 1918, ETSNC was granted a Students' Army Training Corps unit, which consisted of approximately 70 male students before it was demobilized in December following the end of World War I. The early 1920s were also the formative period for student government on campus, in the form of a "student welfare council" with little actual power; Binnion claimed that ETSNC students did "not desire self-government".

During Binnion's presidency, the college took a highly paternalistic attitude towards its students in line with the principle of in loco parentis, which stipulated that it should serve as a surrogate "for absent parents in setting and enforcing rules of behavior and discipline". This resulted in strict rules applying to students, especially female students: women were barred from eating at men's boarding houses or downtown restaurants, had to abide by a rigid curfew, and could not date without their parents' permission. Nonetheless, life on campus was far from boring, with ample opportunities to attend lectures and concerts as well as participate in extracurricular organizations. Regarding Commerce itself, however, Binnion opined that "social opportunities...are somewhat limited...There is very little in the way of excitement here other than picture shows, Sunday Schools and preaching".

In 1921, less than 10 of the approximately 500 ETSNC students were unaffiliated with a church. The best represented Christian denominations on campus were Methodists and Baptists, followed by Disciples of Christ and Presbyterians. Binnion remarked that the student body, in 1921, was "composed largely of country boys and girls of old-time American ancestry".

In 1917, the W. L. Mayo Literary Society for Young Men was founded, the first of a new breed of student club that emphasized social activities and academic excellence. It would soon be joined by several other similar clubs, such as the Demosthenean Society, the History Club, and the Latin Club, as well as more lighthearted groups such as the Citamard Club. The largest organization for female students in 1922 was the YWCA.

During the ETSNC era, future Lieutenant Governor of Texas Thomas Whitfield Davidson briefly attended the school before enrolling at the University of Chicago and Columbia University.
