= Economy of Texas =

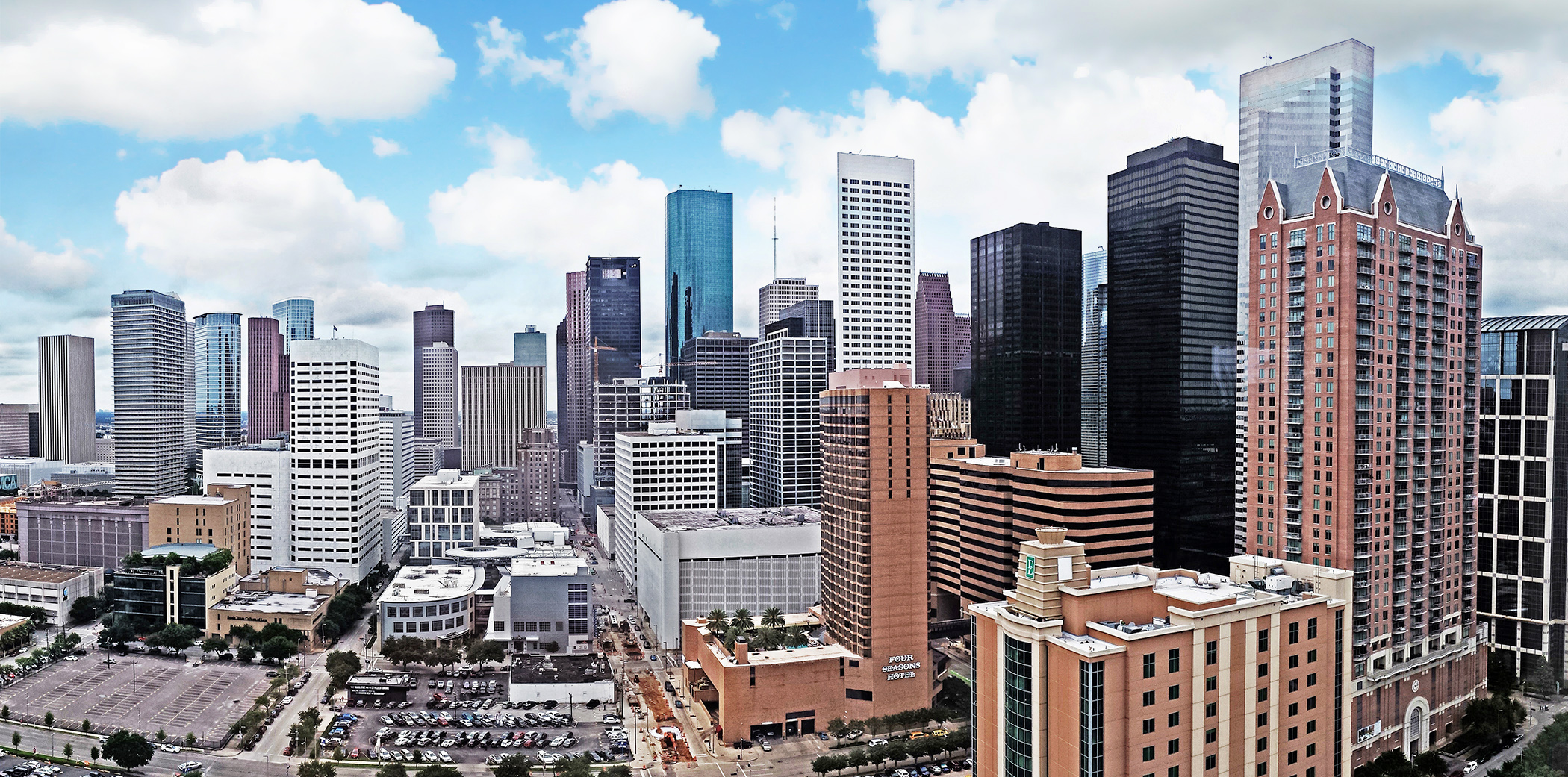
- Houston, the largest city in Texas

Statistics
- GDP: $2.932 trillion (2025)
- GDP per capita: $92,474 (2025)
- Population below national poverty line: 14.0% (absolute); 11.3% (relative)
- Gini coefficient: 0.4796
- Labor force: 15,226,787 (Apr. 2024)
- Unemployment: 4.4% (Aug. 2026)

Public finance
- Revenue: $358 billion (2025)
- Spending: $365.7 billion (2025)

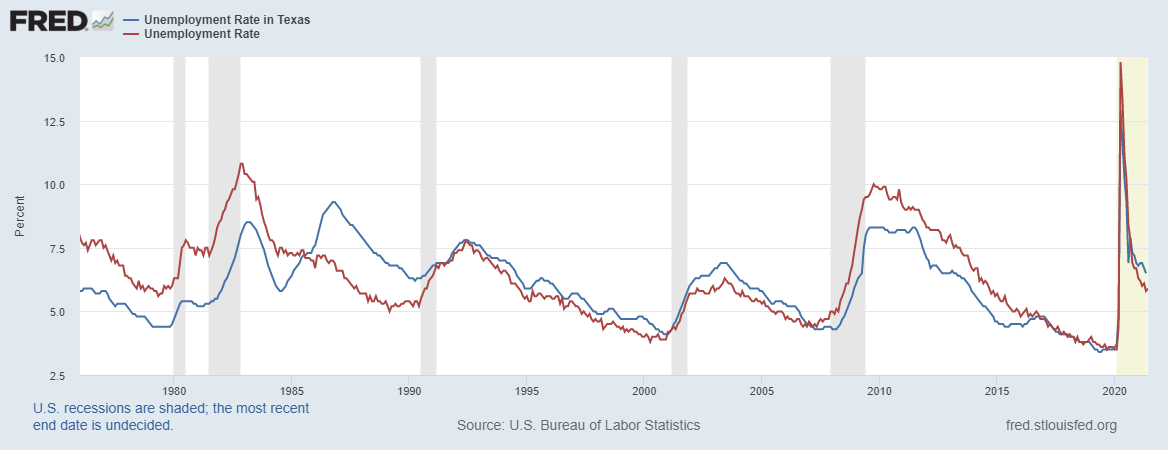
Texas unemployment rate, 1976–2021 US unemployment rate

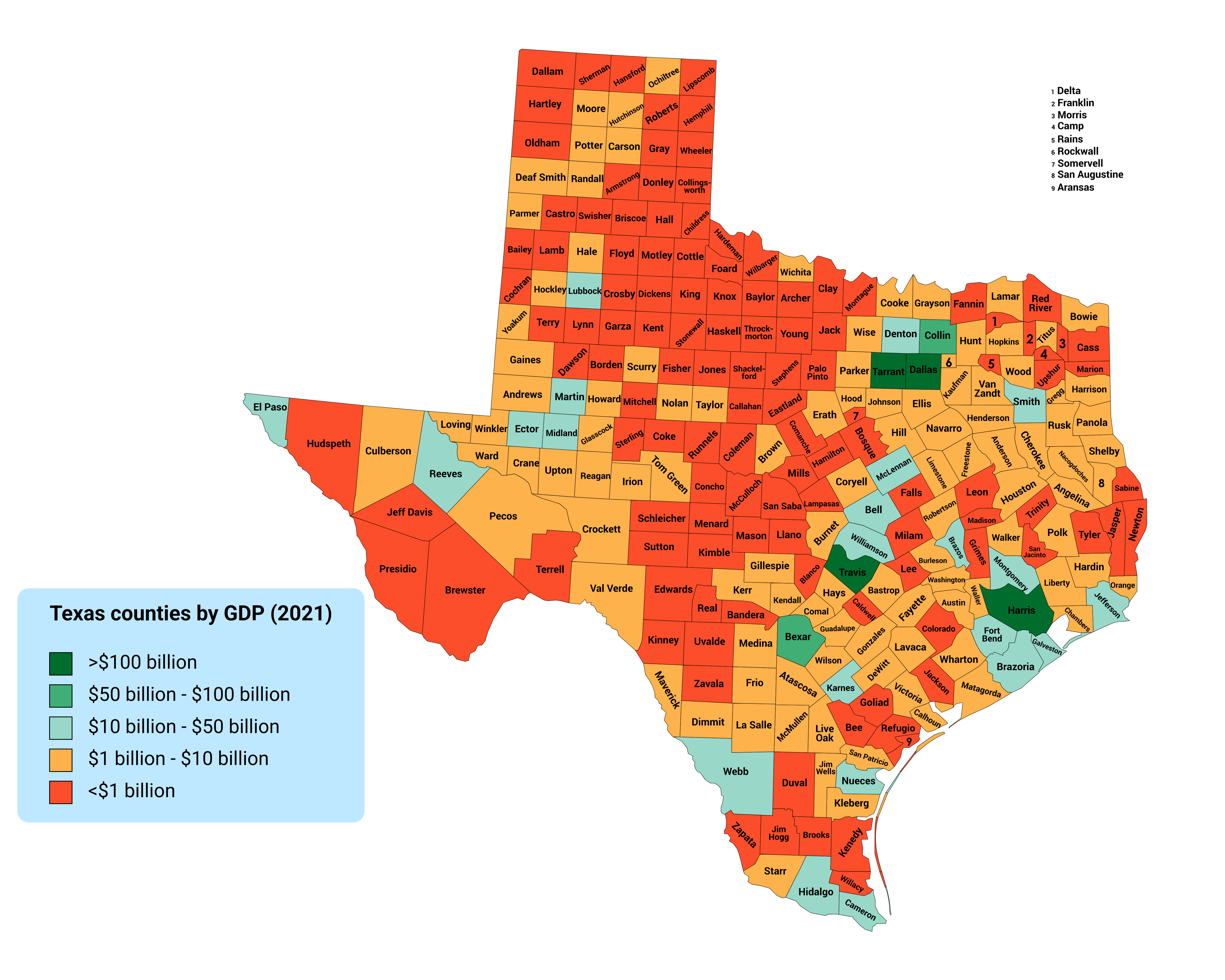
Texas counties by GDP in 2021 (chained 2012 US$)

The economy of the State of Texas is the second largest by GDP in the United States after that of California. It has a gross state product of $2.932 trillion as of 2025. In 2024, Texas had the most Fortune 500 (F500) companies of any state with 53 in total; elevated to 57 F500 companies, the lead was again designated as Texas in 2026.

In 2023, Texas grossed more than $440 billion a year in exports, more than double the next highest state California ($178 billion). The state continued the lead, exporting over $450 billion in goods in 2025, while importing almost $412 billion during the same year, an increase of 3.7% over 2024 imports.

The state ranked as the eighth-largest economy, were it among sovereign nations of the world, by nominal GDP, ahead of Canada, South Korea, Russia, and Australia, in 2022.

In 2024, Texas had a median household income of $79,721. As of 2024, the state had $73,032,946,298 in total outstanding state debt, including both general obligation of $16,611,730,000 and revenue debt of $56,421,216,298. With $8,348,956,000 of total debt issued including $1,235,430,000 general obligation and $7,113,526,000 revenue supported. Texas has the second largest population in the country, following California, as of 2025.

== History ==
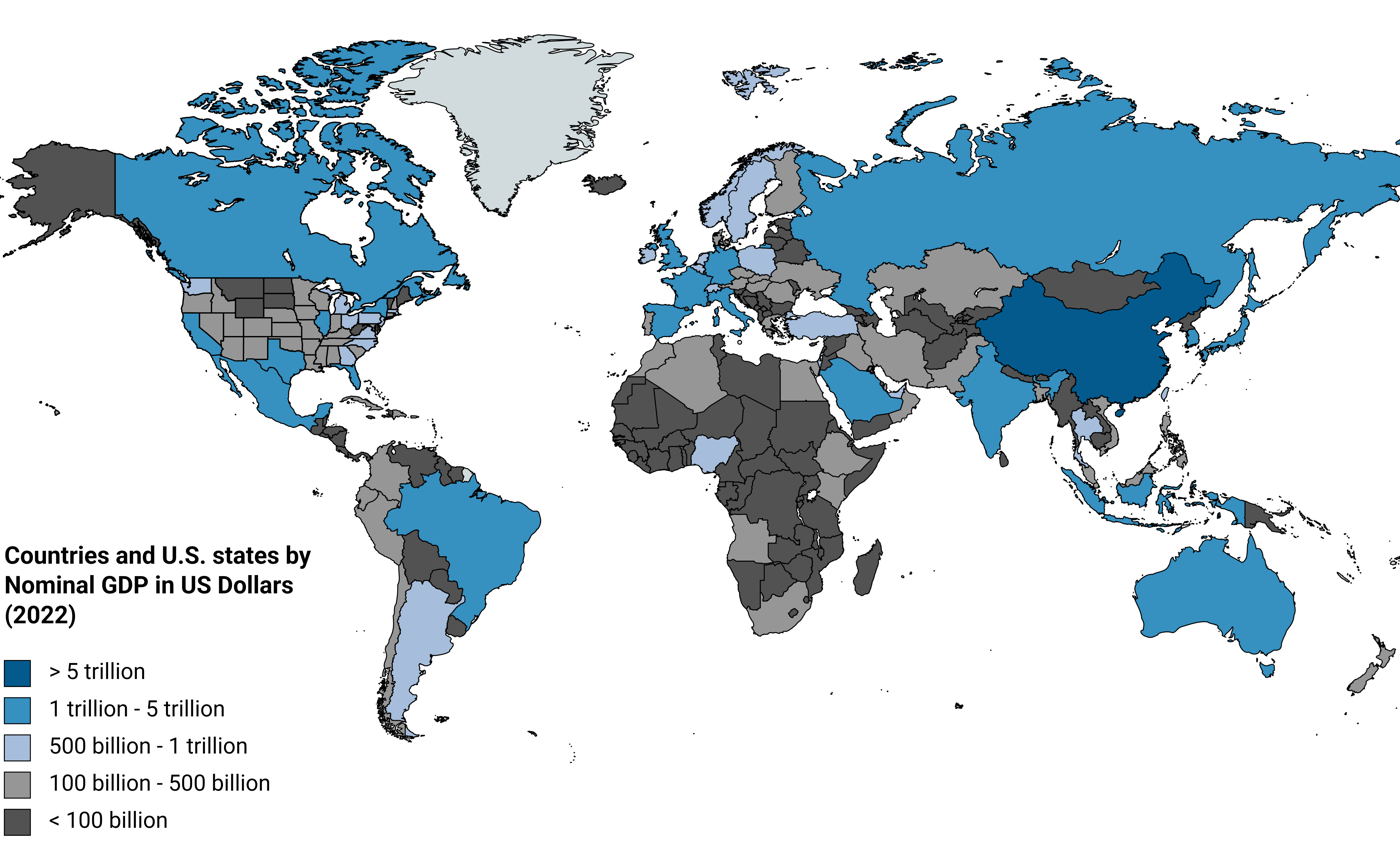
Texas compared to other countries. GDP is in the same range as France, Canada and Russia.

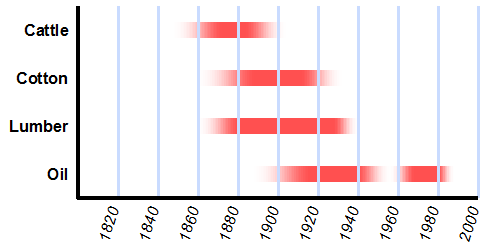
Boom periods of the four major industries that built the early Texas economy

Historically four major business enterprises shaped the Texas economy prior to World War II: cattle and bison, cotton, timber, and oil. The first enterprise to enjoy major success in Texas was cattle and bison. In the early days of Anglo-American settlement, furs and hides were the major products derived from cattle. Beef was not particularly popular in the United States. However, Texas entrepreneurs soon pioneered the beef industry, and demand steadily increased. The cattle industry enjoyed its greatest financial success in the later 1870s and 1880s.

Cotton production, which had been known in Texas since Spanish times, gradually increased throughout the 19th century. By the early 20th century, Texas had become the leading cotton producer in the nation. By the 1920s, the cotton industry was past its peak, as government regulation and foreign competition took their toll.

=== Forests ===
The forests of Texas have been an important resource since its earliest days and have played an important role in the state's history. The vast woodlands of the region, home to many varieties of wildlife when Europeans first arrived, provided major economic opportunities for early settlers. They today continue to play an important role economically and environmentally in the state.

The densest forest lands lie in the eastern part of the state. In particular the Big Thicket region, just north of Houston and Beaumont, has historically been home to the most dense woodlands. The Big Thicket was mostly uninhabited until heavy settlement from the U.S. began in the mid-19th century, and was even used as a refuge by runaway slaves and other fugitives. The Rio Grande valley in South Texas was home to a large palm tree forest when Spaniards first arrived, though today very little of it remains.

The development of railroads in the eastern part of the state during the mid-19th century led to a boom in lumber production in the 1880s. This era of financial success lasted approximately 50 years finally coming to an end as Texas's forests were decimated and the Great Depression dropped prices.

=== Oil boom ===
In 1901 the Gladys City Oil, Gas, and Manufacturing Company struck oil on Spindletop Hill in Beaumont. Though petroleum production was not new, this strike was by far the largest the world had ever seen. The find led to widespread exploration throughout Texas and neighboring states. By 1940 Texas was firmly established as the leading oil producer in the U.S.

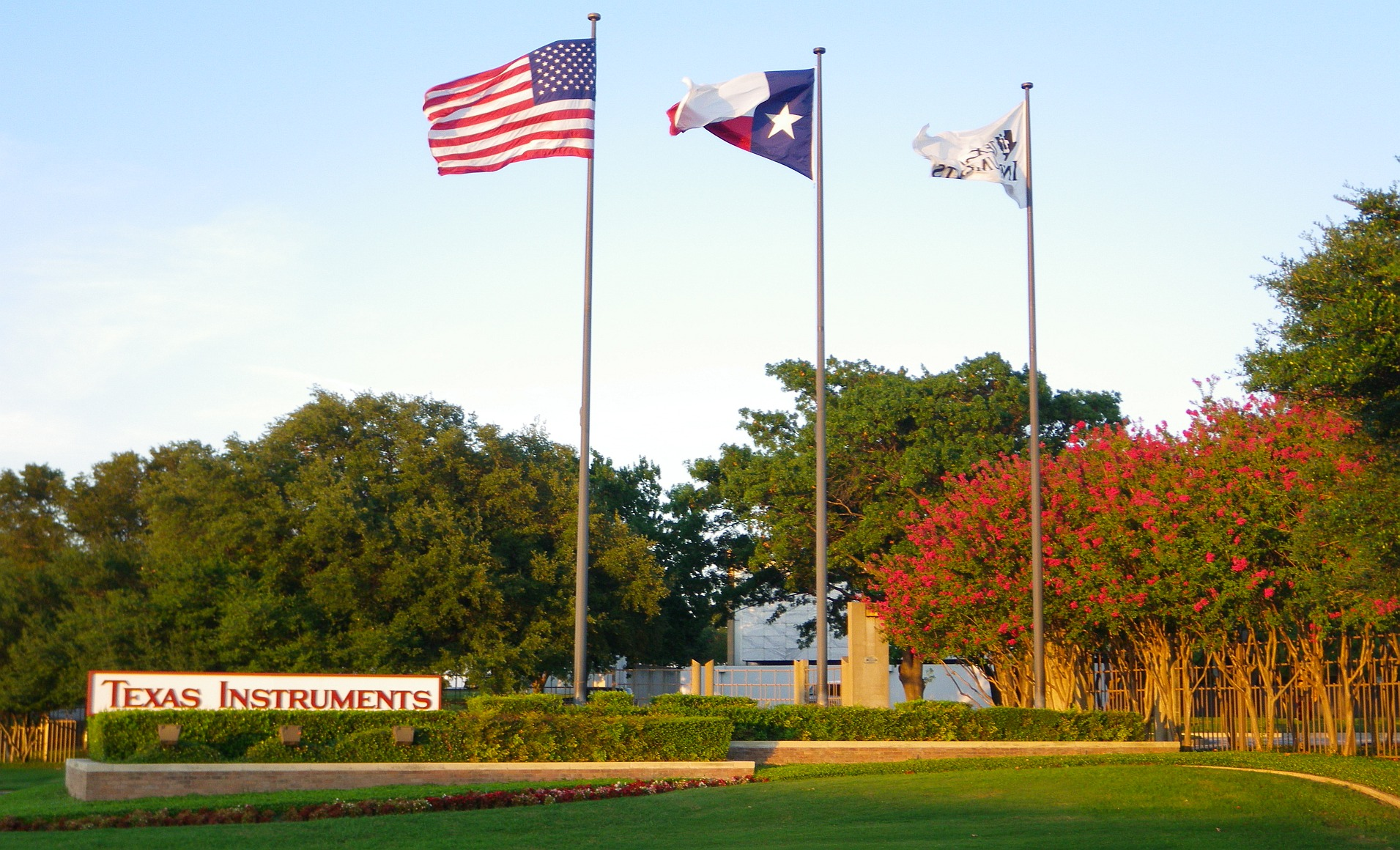
The headquarters of Texas Instruments

Texas remained largely rural until World War II though the success of the petroleum industry rapidly expanded the economy with heavy industry of many types taking root. The second world war created tremendous demand for petroleum and a variety of products that Texas was in a unique position to provide. By the end of the war Texas was one of the leading industrial states and the population had become predominantly urban. Additionally the economy had diversified sufficiently that, though petroleum was still the largest sector by the end of the war, the business community in the state was truly diverse.

The economy of Texas relies largely on information technology, oil and natural gas, aerospace, defense, biomedical research, fuel processing, electric power, agriculture, and manufacturing.

Fortune 500 companies based in Texas according to revenues with State and U.S. rankings
| State | Corporation | US |
| 1 | McKesson | 8 |
| 2 | ExxonMobil | 9 |
| 3 | Chevron Corporation | 21 |
| 4 | Phillips 66 | 29 |
| 5 | AT&T | 35 |
| 6 | Valero Energy | 40 |
| 7 | Dell Technologies | 41 |
| 8 | Tesla | 43 |
| 9 | Energy Transfer | 53 |
| 10 | Sysco | 55 |
| 11 | Caterpillar Inc. | 65 |
| 12 | ConocoPhillips | 75 |
| 13 | Oracle | 82 |
| 14 | American Airlines Group | 86 |
| 15 | Enterprise Products | 89 |
| 16 | USAA | 93 |
| 17 | Plains GP Holdings | 103 |
| 18 | CBRE Group | 118 |
| 19 | Hewlett Packard Enterprise | 133 |
| 20 | D.R. Horton | 134 |
| 21 | NRG Energy | 149 |
| 22 | Quanta Services | 157 |
| 23 | Southwest Airlines | 163 |
| 24 | Baker Hughes | 164 |
| 25 | Charles Schwab | 165 |
| 26 | HF Sinclair | 171 |
| 27 | Occidental Petroleum | 173 |
| 23 | Waste Management | 202 |
| 24 | EOG Resources | 201 |
| 25 | Group 1 Automotive | 204 |
| 25 | Halliburton | 207 |
| 26 | Tenet Healthcare | 214 |
| 27 | Cheniere Energy | 223 |
| 28 | Kimberly-Clark | 225 |
| 29 | Corebridge Financial | 236 |
| 30 | Vistra | 274 |
| 31 | Texas Instruments | 252 |
| 32 | Targa Resources | 262 |
| 33 | Kinder Morgan | 266 |
| 34 | Keurig Dr Pepper | 268 |
| 35 | AECOM | 276 |
| 36 | Fluor | 292 |
| 37 | Builders FirstSource | 296 |
| 38 | Diamondback Energy | 301 |
| 39 | Jacobs Solutions | 369 |
| 40 | Yum China Holdings | 375 |
| 41 | Westlake Chemical | 388 |
| 42 | Celanese | 431 |
| 43 | CenterPoint Energy | 435 |
| 44 | APA Corporation | 438 |
| 45 | Comfort Systems USA | 440 |
| 46 | NOV | 455 |
| 47 | KBR | 470 |
| 48 | Commercial Metals | 491 |
| 49 | Coterra Energy | 496 |
| 50 | Primoris Services | 497 |
Further information: List of Texas companies Source: "The Full Fortune 500 List" 2026

== Exports ==
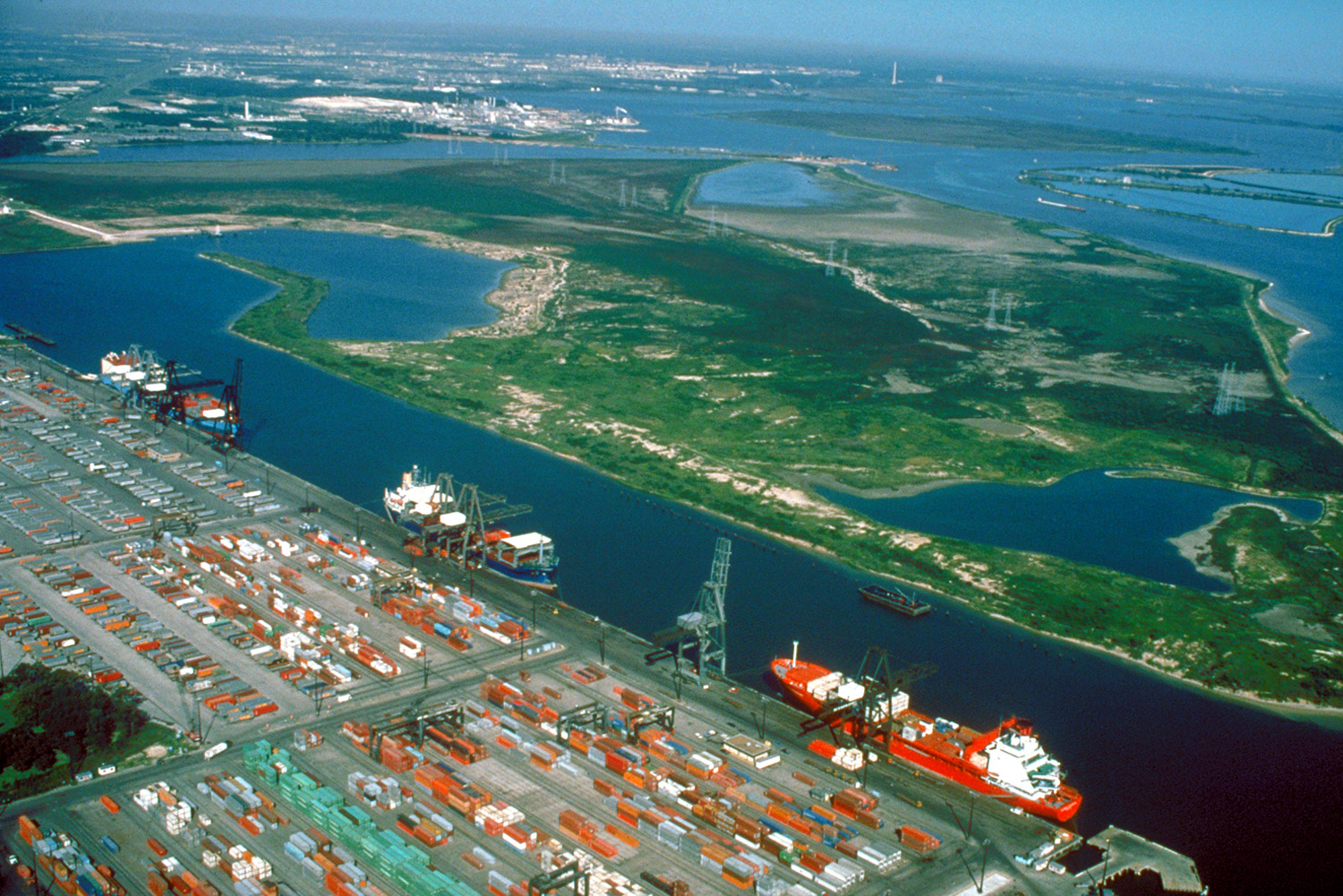
Houston Ship Channel

Texas had led the United States in export revenues since 2001, grossing more than $440 billion in 2023.

Largest export categories (2023):

1. Oil and gas – $140 billion
2. Petroleum and coal products - $70 billion
3. Chemicals - $58 billion
4. Computer and electronic parts - $53 billion
5. Transportation equipment - $27 billion

Mexico is by far the largest export partner with Texas, receiving nearly $130 billion worth of goods in 2023. The next largest export partners are Canada ($36 billion) and Netherlands ($26 billion).

Air Cargo World rated Dallas/Fort Worth International Airport as "the best air cargo airport in the world". The Port of Houston is the largest port in the U.S. by tonnage, with more than 266 million tons of cargo passing through the port in 2021.

== Taxes ==
According to the Tax Foundation, Texans' state and local tax burdens are among the lowest in the nation, 7th lowest nationally, with state and local taxes costing $3,580 per capita, or 8.7% of resident incomes. Texas is one of only 7 states not to have a state income tax. The state sales tax rate, 6.25%, is above the national medium, with localities adding up to 2% (8.25% total). Texas does have a "back to school" sales tax holiday once a year (generally around the first weekend in August) on clothing and footwear under $100.

As for Texas's business tax climate, the state ranks 8th in the nation. Property taxes are exclusively collected at the local level in the state, and are generally at rates above the national average.

=== Tax burden ===
Texas is one of the seven states of the United States with no personal state income tax. In addition, Texas does not allow any lower level of government (counties, cities, etc.) to impose an income tax. This means that, for the residents of Texas, the maximum rate of income taxation is the top rate set by the federal government. Businesses, except for sole proprietorships and partnerships, are subject to a franchise tax.

The state sales tax is set at 6.25 percent. Cities are allowed to impose an additional 2% tax, most Texas sales tax rates are 8.25 with an average sales tax of 7.968%. The state determines the items subject to sales tax, which all other entities must follow. Motor vehicle sales are subject only to the 6.25% state sales tax. Along with clothing, restaurants, and certain medicines. Groceries, except for prepared food, prescription drugs and OTC drugs are among the major items exempt from sales tax.

While property taxes are among the highest in the nation with the median property tax being $2,275 per year with a home with a median value of $125,800. Property costs are also among the lowest in the nation. Property taxes constitute the majority of revenue and are collected and kept by local governments, as the Texas Constitution specifically prohibits a state property tax. For real property, counties, cities, and school districts (along with other special districts, such as for a community college or public hospital) can also impose taxes. All property is assessed uniformly throughout the county via the county "appraisal district", and taxes are assessed based on 100% of the property's assessed value. While larger personal property items such as cars, boats, and airplanes can be subject to local taxes as well, it is far less common.

== Industries ==
=== Agriculture ===
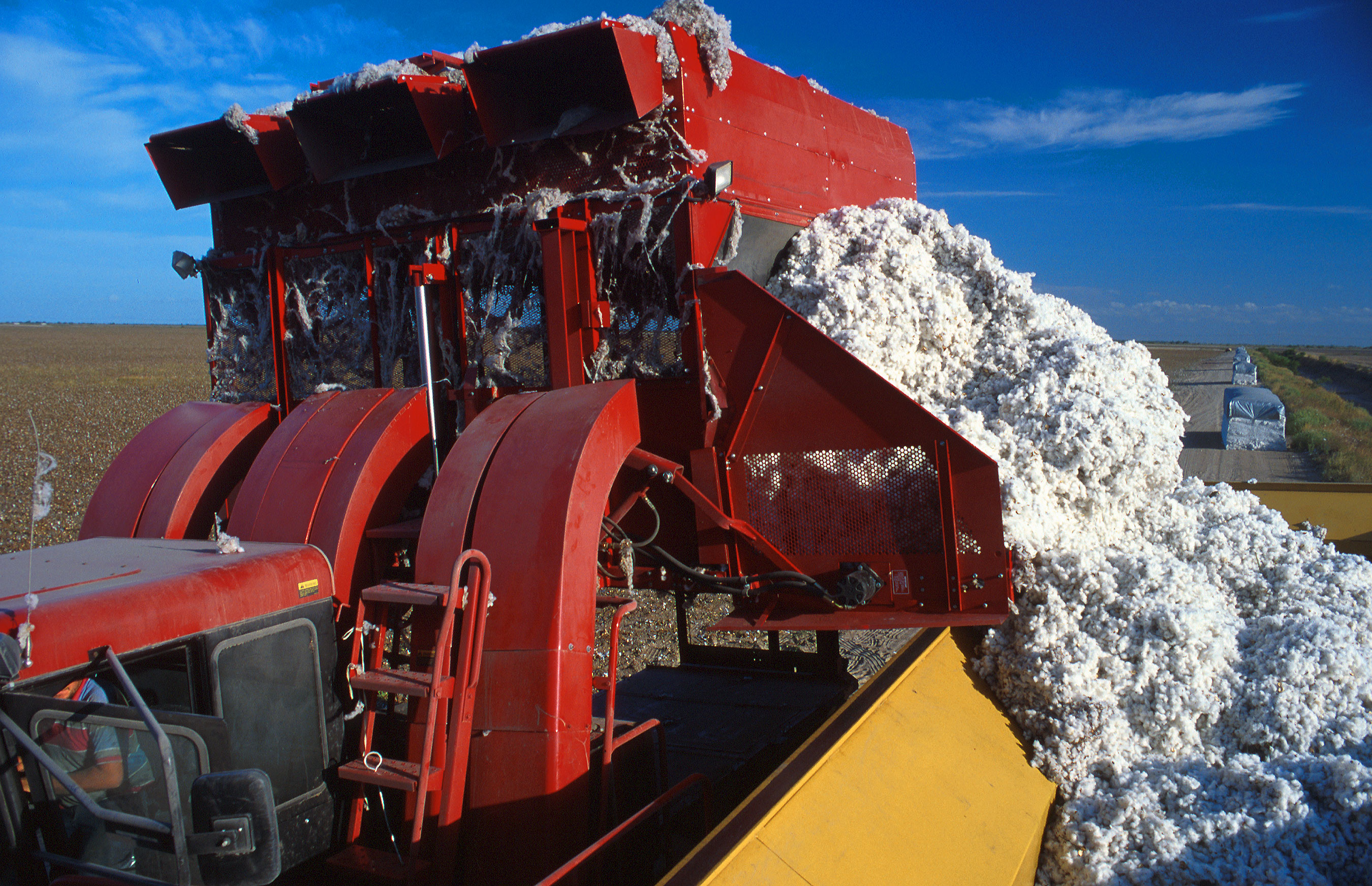
Offloading freshly harvested cotton into a module builder. Previously built modules can be seen in the background.

Texas has the most farms in the United States, both in terms of number and acreage. Texas leads the nation in number of cattle, typically exceeding 16 million head, and also leads in cotton, hay, sheep, wool, goat and mohair production. Agriculture is essential to its economy; $150 billion dollars was gained from agriculture in 2024.

Cultivation of mung bean here began during World War II when a Chinese native by the name of Henry Huie – who worked as a U.S. Army cook – planted the staple crop in the clay plains near Vernon.

Texas leads nationally in production of sheep and goat products. Texas is king of cotton, leading the nation in cotton production, its leading crop and second-most-valuable farm product. It is a leader in cereal crop production. Three counties in the state—Colorado, Wharton and Matagorda—take advantage of water from the Lower Colorado River Authority to grow rice and are responsible for about 5% of annual U.S. rice production. Texas is also a large producer of cantaloupes.

The Rio Grande Valley is one of the best areas for the cultivation of grapefruit. Early varieties like the Duncan had many seeds and pale flesh, but in the 1880s citrus growers in Texas and Florida discovered pink-fleshed seedless grapefruit mutations like the Ruby Red, which, along with red-fleshed varieties like the Rio Red and Star Ruby, are preferred varieties for modern commercial production.

Grapes are a common crop in some parts of Texas. In the 1990s, strawberry acres had greatly increased, especially around Poteet; however, by 2004, imported strawberries had competed almost all strawberry production out of the state.

Texas and Arkansas are among the higher producers of spinach in North America and form the eastern limit of large scale commercial production. It is the westernmost limit of commercial okra production; one of the largest producers of onions, and a major grower of watermelons.

Fire ants (Solenopsis invicta) are an invasive agricultural pest in the state.

=== Aeronautics ===
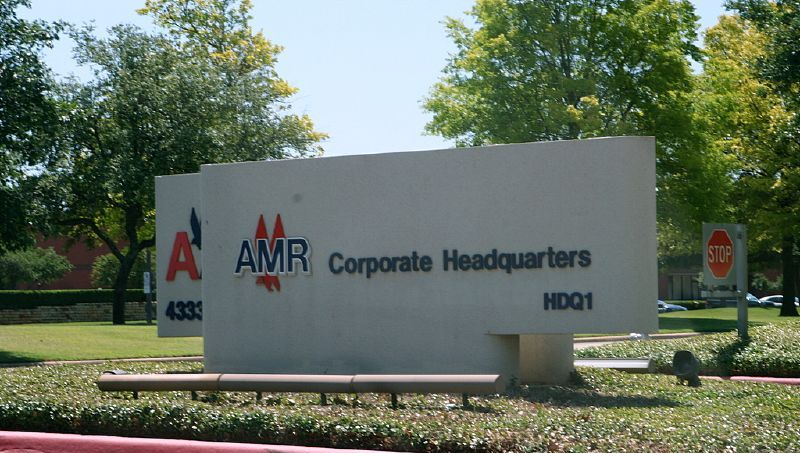
Headquarters of American Airlines and AMR Corporation in Fort Worth

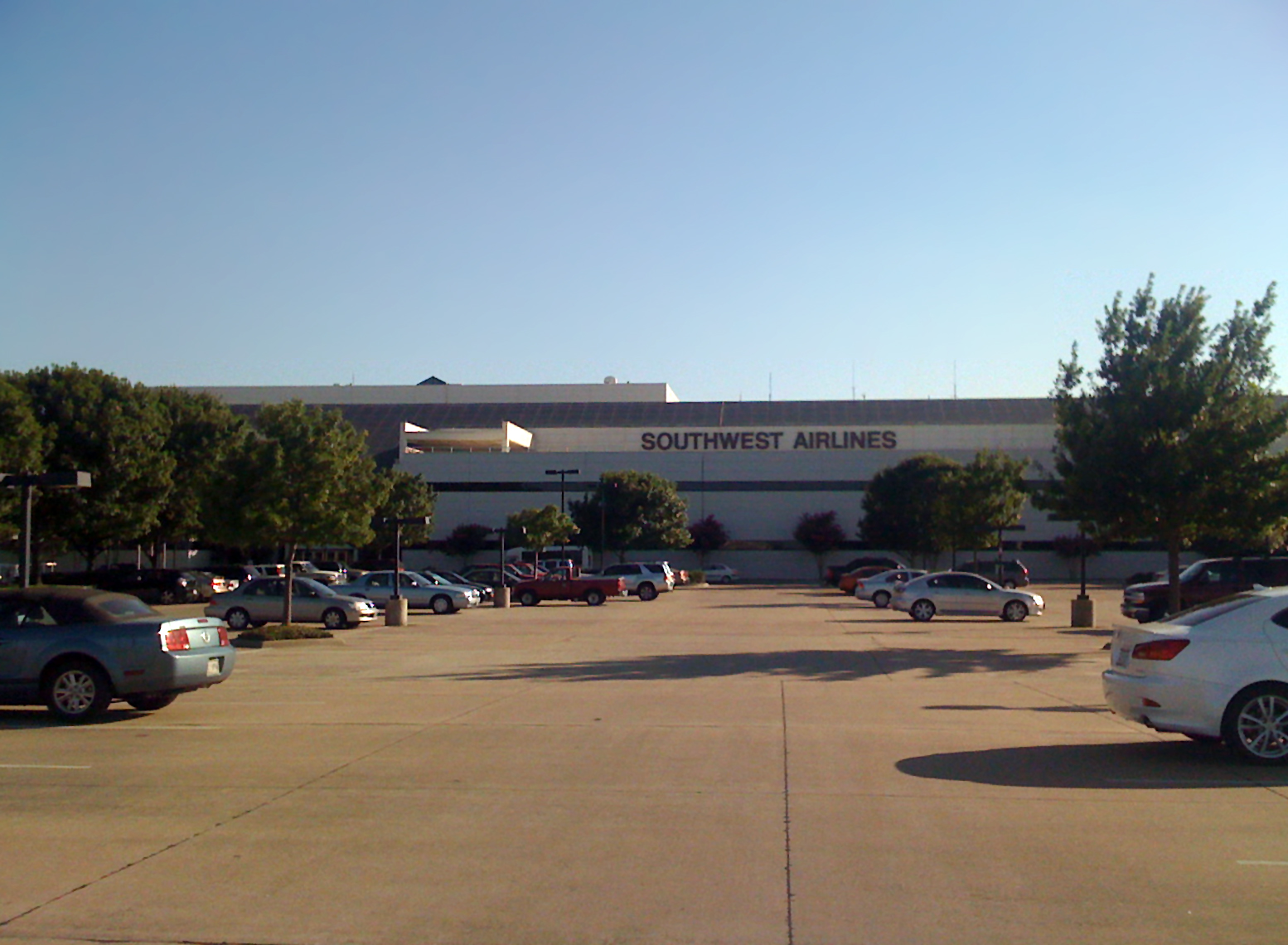
Southwest Airlines headquarters in Dallas

Lyndon B. Johnson Space Center, the center of the National Aeronautics and Space Administration (NASA), is located in Houston. It is a leading hub for the Aeronautics industry. The National Space and Biomedical Research Institute is headquartered in Houston.

Dallas/Fort Worth International Airport, located nearly equidistant from downtown Dallas and downtown Fort Worth, is the largest airport in the state, the second-largest in the US, and the fourth-largest in the world. The airport serves 135 domestic destinations and 40 international. DFW is the largest and main hub for American Airlines, one of the world's largest in terms of total passengers-miles transported and passenger fleet size.

Texas's second-largest air facility is Houston's George Bush Intercontinental Airport (IAH), the largest hub of United Airlines. IAH offers service to the most Mexican destinations of any U.S. airport. IAH is currently ranked second among all U.S. airports with scheduled non-stop domestic and international service.

Headquartered in Fort Worth, American Airlines is the world's largest airline by passenger miles, passengers carried, and revenue. Southwest Airlines, also a leader in the commercial passenger market, is based near Love Field airport in Dallas. Lockheed Martin Aeronautics, the aviation division of Lockheed Martin, is also headquartered in Fort Worth, and the company's Missiles and Fire Control division is based in nearby Grand Prairie, along with the American division of Airbus Helicopters, Airbus Helicopters, Inc. Bell Helicopter is headquartered in Fort Worth as well.

=== Defense ===
Texas is home to two of the United States Army's largest facilities (in terms of geographic size), Fort Cavazos in Central Texas near Killeen and Fort Bliss near El Paso. In addition, Fort Sam Houston in San Antonio is home to the Brooke Army Medical Center, one of the Army's major hospitals and its only burn facility, and the Corpus Christi Army Depot in Corpus Christi, Texas is home to the world's largest helicopter repair and maintenance facility.

The United States Air Force operates several bases in the state – Sheppard (Wichita Falls); Dyess (Abilene); Goodfellow (San Angelo); Laughlin (Del Rio); Lackland and Randolph (San Antonio); and Ellington Airport (Houston).

The United States Navy operates Naval Air Station Joint Reserve Base Fort Worth (the former Carswell Air Force Base facility) as well as NAS Corpus Christi and NAS Kingsville.

==== Defense contracting ====
Texas (specifically Dallas and Houston) has a large number of defense contractors that create sizable employment for the state.

Two divisions of Lockheed Martin have their divisional headquarters in the DFW area – Lockheed Martin Aeronautics in Fort Worth (where the F-16 Fighting Falcon, the largest Western fighter program, is manufactured, as well as its successor, the F-35 Lightning II and the F-22 Raptor) and Lockheed Martin Missiles and Fire Control in Grand Prairie.

Fort Worth is also the home of Bell Helicopter Textron, which manufactures several helicopters for the military, including the V-22 and the H-1, on which final assembly is performed in Amarillo. Furthermore, three major defense service contractors (DynCorp, AECOM, and DXC Technology) have substantial operations in Fort Worth.

Other major defense contractors with DFW presence include Boeing (Richardson), Rockwell Collins (Richardson), Vought Corporation (headquarters in Dallas; facilities in Dallas and Grand Prairie), Raytheon (plants in Garland, Dallas, and McKinney), L-3 Communications (plants in Arlington, Carrollton, and Greenville; also has a facility in Waco), BAE Systems (facility in Fort Worth), Leonardo DRS (Dallas), Hewlett Packard Enterprise and NTT Data (Plano), Alliant Techsystems (facility in Fort Worth), and Elbit Systems (facility and US headquarters in Fort Worth). The Defense Contract Audit Agency maintains its Central Region office in Irving.

Outside the DFW area, KBR (the former Halliburton subsidiary) maintains its headquarters in Houston, while the Southwest Research Institute is located in San Antonio. BAE Systems also manufactures the Family of Medium Tactical Vehicles at its facility in Sealy, Texas.

=== Computer technology ===
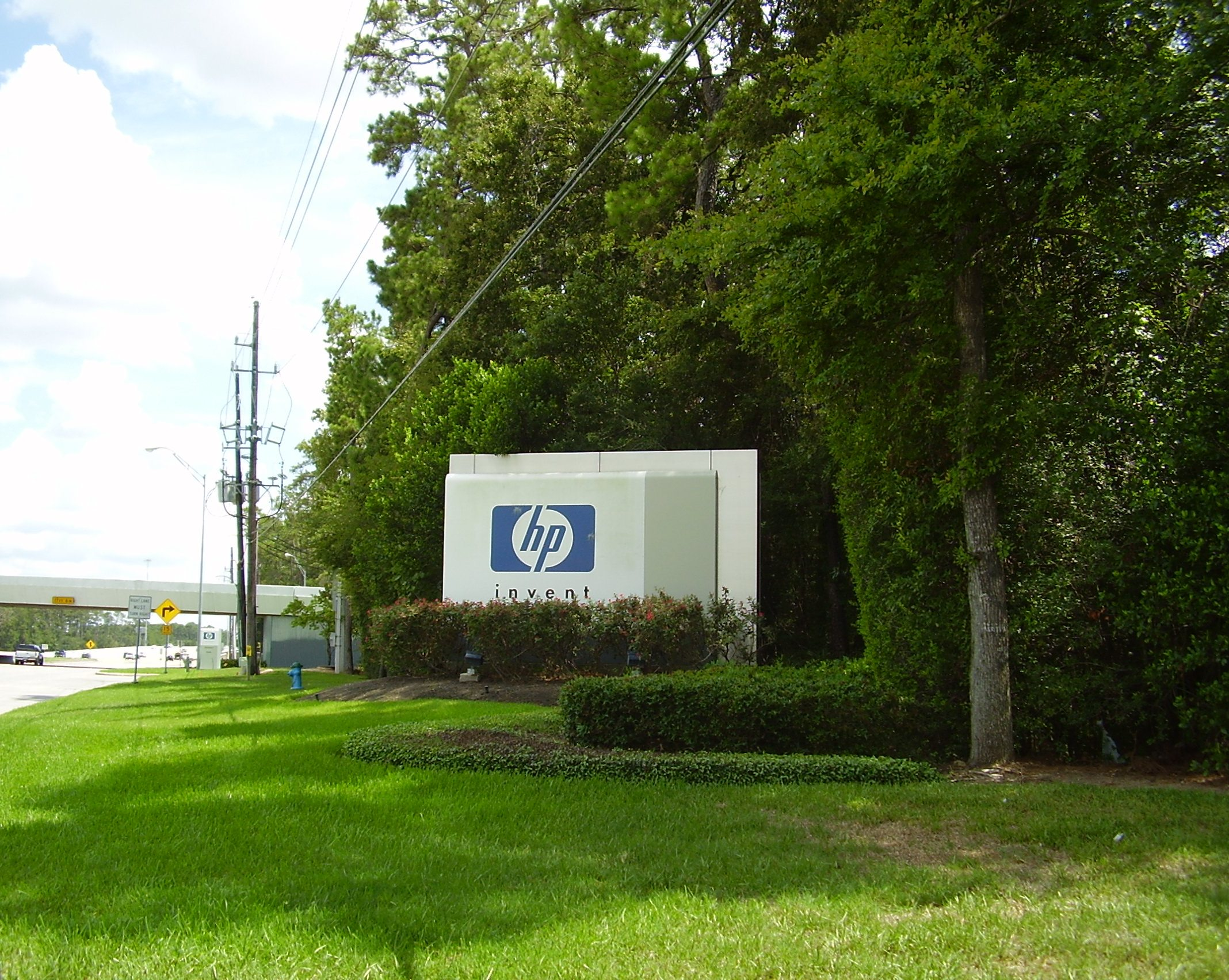
Hewlett-Packard United States offices near Houston, previously the Compaq headquarters

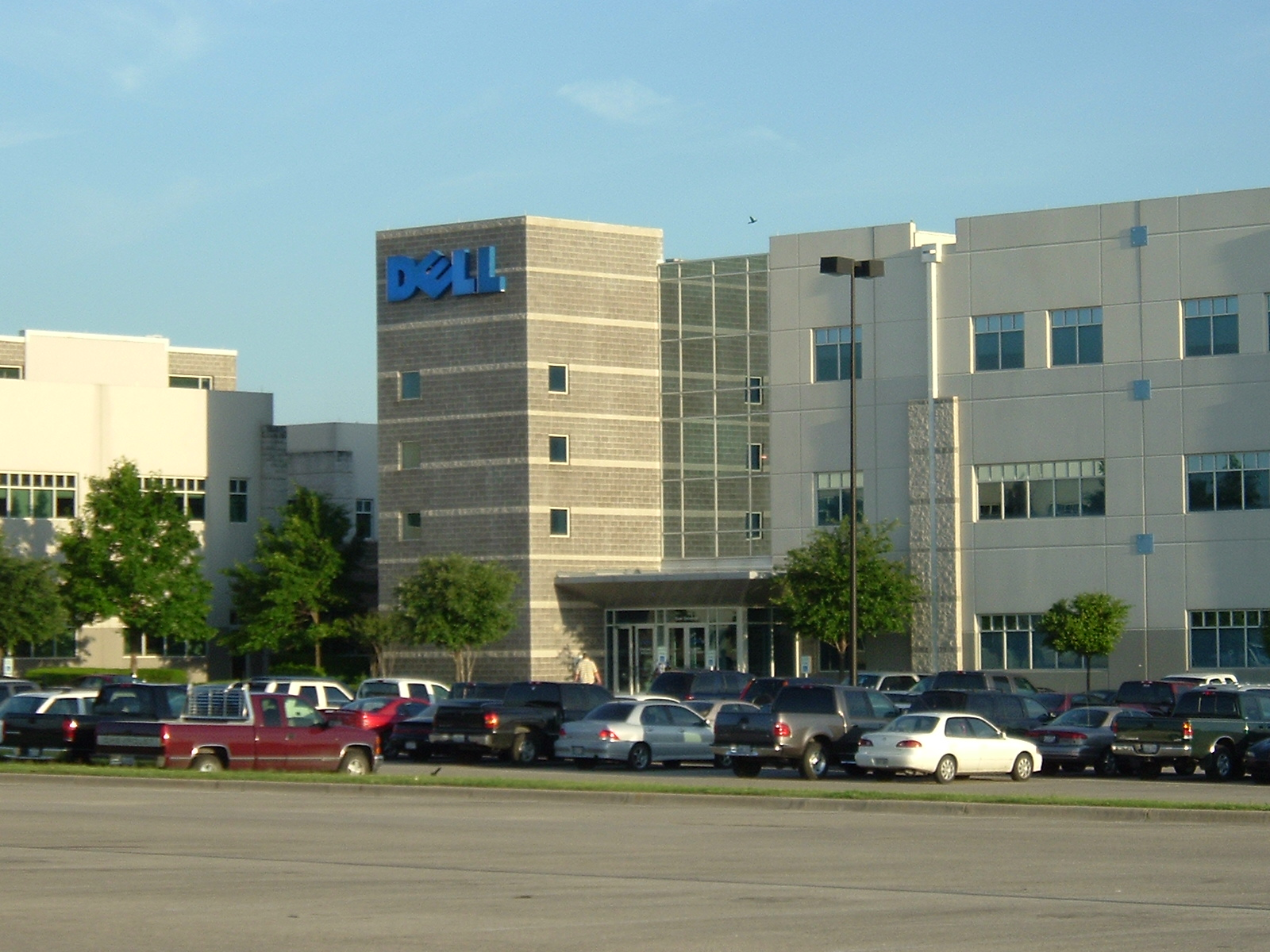
Dell headquarters in Round Rock

Texas is one of the major hubs in the U.S. for development of computer components, systems, software and information infrastructure. Austin, Dallas, and Houston are the major centers for this industry in Texas. The Austin area is often nicknamed "Silicon Hills" because of the concentration of semiconductor design companies including AMD, Cirrus Logic, Freescale Semiconductor, Intel and Silicon Labs. Dell's headquarters is located in the city's suburb, Round Rock, and major offices for Google, Facebook, EA Games, and Apple are also open in the Austin area. Austin is also the home of the Texas Advanced Computing Center at The University of Texas at Austin. Dallas is the birthplace of the integrated circuit.

The North Dallas area is called the "Telecom Corridor" or the "Silicon Prairie" for the area's high concentration of information technology companies such as Texas Instruments, Perot Systems, and EDS, as well as telecommunications giant AT&T. San Antonio is the home of cloud computing giant Rackspace, as well as computing pioneer Datapoint. Harris County-based Compaq, was once one of the world's largest computer companies. After Compaq's merger with Hewlett-Packard, the new owner currently employs more employees in the Houston area than anywhere else in the world.

=== Energy ===
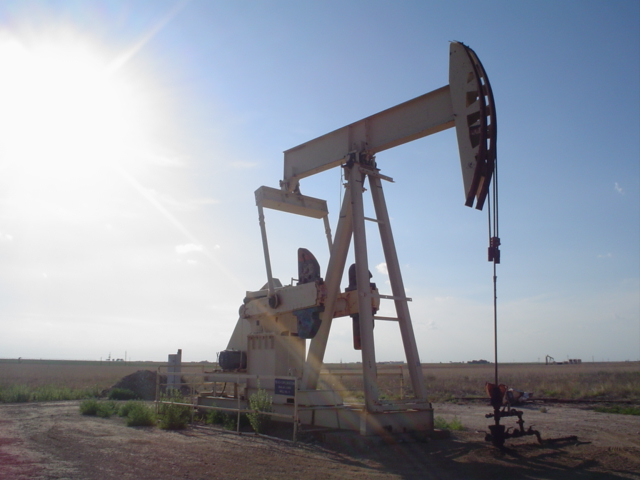
An oil well

Energy is a major component of the state economy, especially Oil. Texans consume the most energy in the nation both in per capita and as a whole. The state is also the nation's largest energy producer, producing twice as much energy as Florida, the state with the second-highest production. It is also the national leader in wind power generation, comprising about 28% of national wind powered electrical production in 2019. Wind power surpassed nuclear power production in the state in 2014.

=== Tourism ===
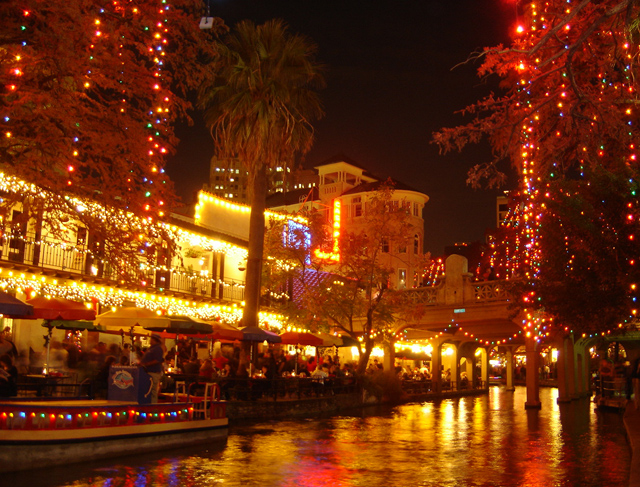
The San Antonio River Walk

Texas has a large tourism industry. With a record 62 million travelers and gaining $97.5 billion dollar from tourism in 2024. The state tourism slogan is "Texas: It's like a whole other country." Tourists may partake in San Antonio and El Paso's Hispanic culture, or in Fort Worth's western attractions. Galveston, Corpus Christi, and Padre Island are some of the popular resort areas located on the Gulf of Mexico. Houston is the leading convention city in Texas, characterized by its Southern culture. Dallas and San Antonio are also among the nation's leading convention cities. Professional and college sports are dominant in both Dallas and Houston.

=== Entertainment ===
Texas is a top filmmaking state. Austin is now one of the leading filmmaking locations in the country. The exteriors for the popular soap opera Dallas were filmed on Southfork Ranch, a location at Parker, Texas. From 1995 to 2004, more than $2.75 billion was spent in Texas for film and television production.

The Texas Film Commission was founded for free services to filmmakers, from location research to traveling. Also many Hollywood studios are relocating parts of their production divisions to the Austin, Houston, and Dallas areas.

The media conglomerate iHeartMedia is based in San Antonio, Texas. Video game developers Robot Entertainment, Gearbox Software, and 3D Realms are based in the Dallas Fort Worth area, while Retro Studios, Armature Studio, and Ghostfire Games are based in Austin. Cinemark Theatres which is one of the largest movie theater chains is also based in the Dallas Fort Worth area.

=== Healthcare ===
Healthcare is a growing industry in the state. The Texas Medical Center, located in south central Houston, is the largest medical center in the world. It is home to University of Texas Health Science Center at Houston which trains medical students and residents, and includes The University of Texas M.D. Anderson Cancer Center, a global leader of cancer research and treatment; the facility also hosts a private medical college, The Baylor College of Medicine.

The University of Texas medical system has additional branches in Dallas, San Antonio, Tyler, and Galveston. The South Texas Medical Center in San Antonio, with nearly 27,000 employees in 2008, had a $14.3 billion economic impact on the state of Texas. In addition to these facilities, the Texas College of Osteopathic Medicine, the Texas A&M Health Science Center,, and Texas Tech University Health Sciences Center in Lubbock and El Paso provide the state with a total of nine centers of medical research.

== Wealthiest places in Texas ==
The following list contains per capita incomes of the 32 wealthiest locations in Texas:

1. Round Top – $191,799
2. Piney Point Village – $187,796
3. Quintana – $185,624
4. Westlake – $184,242
5. Barton Creek – $184,151
6. Westover Hills – $181,408
7. Hunters Creek Village – $178,130
8. Highland Park – $171,411
9. Hill Country Village – $149,928
10. Mentone – $144,707
11. West University Place – $142,082
12. Redfield – $136,814
13. Olmos Park – $133,177
14. Bunker Hill Village – $132,835
15. Southside Place – $132,802
16. Hedwig Village – $130,254
17. Rollingwood – $117,411
18. Tiki Island – $115,696
19. Shavano Park – $115,611
20. University Park – $112,326
21. Southlake – $110,228
22. Magnolia Beach – $106,297
23. Alamo Heights – $105,887
24. West Lake Hills – $105,273
25. Bellaire – $104,552
26. Chilton – $101,759
27. Heath – $101,301
28. Terrell Hills – $99,662
29. Hilshire Village – $96,034
30. Spring Valley Village – $95,097
31. Colleyville – $92,557
32. Sunset Valley – $91,349

== See also ==
- Category:Companies based in Texas
- Category:Economies by country
- Category:Economies by region
- List of U.S. state economies
- Minimum wage in the United States
- List of U.S. states by minimum wage
- Silicon Hills
- Silicon Prairie
- Texas Stock Exchange
- Texas rice production
- Texas wine
