= James H. Lee (businessman) =

Founder and CEO of the Texas Stock Exchange

- Born: c. 1965 (age 60–61); Houston, Texas, United States
- Education: University of Texas at Austin (McCombs School of Business)
- Occupations: Businessman, investor
- Known for: Founder and CEO of the Texas Stock Exchange
- Spouse: Amy Lee
- Children: Two

James H. Lee is an American businessman based in Dallas, Texas. He is the founder and chief executive officer of the Texas Stock Exchange, an electronic, national securities exchange announced in 2024 and headquartered in Dallas.

== Early life and education ==
Lee graduated from Strake Jesuit College Preparatory in 1984. He earned a Bachelor of Business Administration in 1988 and a Master of Business Administration in 1992 from the McCombs School of Business at the University of Texas at Austin. In 2005, Lee completed the Finance Executive Programme at the London Business School, with a focus on hedge funds and alternative investments.

== Career ==
Lee began his investment banking career at First Boston Corporation in Houston from 1988 to 1990, working in the Natural Resources Division of the Mergers & Acquisitions Group. In 1991, he joined Lehman Brothers in New York, continuing in the same division.

In 1995, he co-founded Momentum Securities LLC, where he was president until its acquisition by Tradescape.com in 2003. He later led global electronic trading at E*TRADE from 2002 to 2004.

Since 2006, Lee has been the managing member of JHL Capital Holdings LLC, a Houston-based investment group. He was also the president of Ascendant Advisors, a Texas-based investment advisory firm that manages the Ascendant Tactical Yield Fund from 2009 to 2021.

In 2023, Lee founded TXSE Group Inc. In June 2024, TXSE Group Inc. announced plans to launch the Texas Stock Exchange (TXSE), where Lee is chief executive officer. According to the U.S. Securities and Exchange Commission (SEC) filings, TXSE submitted a Form 1 registration to the U.S. Securities and Exchange Commission with investments totalling approximately $161 million as of January 2025.

== Public service ==
Lee has held several public appointments in Texas:

- Commissioner, Texas Finance Commission (2002–2004)
- Chairman, Teacher Retirement System of Texas (2006–2009)
- Member, Texas Parks and Wildlife Commission (2013–2019)
- Commissioner, Sunset Advisory Commission (2021–2023)

== Philanthropy ==
In 1998, Lee established the Mr. & Mrs. James H. Lee Endowed Presidential Scholarship at the McCombs School of Business at the University of Texas.

Lee is president of the Board of Trustees of the Houston Symphony Endowment, managing a $100 million endowment. He has been on the Texas Parks and Wildlife Foundation Board the UTHealth Development Board and the Texas Higher Education Coordinating Board.

== Recognition ==
In 2001, Lee was named Ernst & Young Entrepreneur of the Year for e-Finance.

== Personal life ==
Jim Lee is married to Amy Lee, they have two sons, and reside in Dallas, Texas.
