= Texas Stock Exchange =

American stock exchange

- Type: Stock exchange
- Location: Dallas, Texas, United States
- Founded: July 6, 2026; 4 months ago
- Key people: James Lee (CEO)
- Currency: United States dollar
- Website: txse.com

The Texas Stock Exchange (TXSE) is a national stock exchange headquartered in downtown Dallas, Texas, United States. The group behind the exchange, led by TXSE CEO James Lee, is financed by institutional investors including Charles Schwab, Fortress, BlackRock, Citadel Securities, and JPMorgan Chase.

== History ==
In October 2025, TXSE Group completed its second round of financing, raising total company capital to more than $250 million, up from approximately $161 million as of January 2025. JPMorgan joined the exchange's existing backers, and will join TXSE Group's board as an observer. Further investment totalling $20 million was made in December 2025 from a group headlined by Goldman Sachs Group Inc. and Bank of America Corp, bringing capital raised to $270 million.

According to U.S. Securities and Exchange Commission (SEC) filings, the committed investment makes TXSE the most well-capitalized exchange to ever submit a registration to the SEC. On September 30, 2025, the SEC granted its approval for TXSE to operate as a national securities exchange. The exchange launched on 6 July 2026, with full operation from 31 July 2026.

In November 2026, Texas-based Frost Bank's parent company, Cullen/Frost Bankers, Inc., moved Frost's primary stock listings entirely from the New York Stock Exchange (NYSE) to TXSE. The bank became the first company to ring the opening bell for TXSE.

== Structure and operations ==
TXSE accepts primary listings and double listing of companies already present on NYSE or Nasdaq and will accept listings of ETFs and other exchange-traded products. The exchange also plans to facilitate listings for public companies, exchange-traded products (ETPs), and American depositary receipts (ADRs).

According to CEO James Lee, TXSE plans to implement stringent listing standards that would be more restrictive than current exchanges. These standards would include earnings tests and minimum price requirements that, according to Lee's statements to the Financial Times, would exclude approximately 1,500 Nasdaq-listed companies and 200 NYSE-listed companies from qualifying. The exchange will be fully electronic and will maintain a physical presence in Dallas.

== Leadership ==
In September 2024, former President of the Federal Reserve Bank of Dallas Richard W. Fisher and former Texas Governor Rick Perry were named as a strategic advisor and a member of the board of directors, respectively. Additional board members include Rick Roberts, a former SEC commissioner, and Alex Bussandri, global head of strategy at Citadel Securities. TXSE plans for its physical presence to be in the heart of Dallas at the Texas Market Center (TMC), where the company expects to employ more than 100 people. Energy Transfer Partners CEO Kelcy Warren is the majority owner of TXSE Group Inc. Other board members include Paul Foster, founder of Western Refining, and Tyson Tuttle, CEO and founder of Austin-based A.I. startup Circuit.

== Market context ==
The exchange estimates its initial potential market includes approximately 1,000 publicly traded companies and 14,000 private equity-backed companies based in the "southeast and southwestern quadrant" of the United States (seQ), an area stretching from Texas to North Carolina. Dallas, which hosts a Federal Reserve Bank and 24 Fortune 500 companies, is considered the nation's second-biggest financial hub by number of industry employees. The proposal to establish TXSE comes at a time when several Fortune 500 companies are relocating their headquarters to the state.

== See also ==
- List of stock exchanges
- Economy of Texas
- List of companies in Dallas
- List of companies in the Dallas–Fort Worth metroplex
