= Barton Creek, Texas =

- CDP
- Location of Barton Creek, Texas
- Coordinates: 30°16′48″N 97°52′25″W
- Country: United States
- State: Texas
- County: Travis

Area
  - Total: 5.4 sq mi (13.9 km^{2})
  - Land: 5.4 sq mi (13.9 km^{2})
  - Water: 0 sq mi (0.0 km^{2})
- Elevation: 804 ft (245 m)

Population (2020)
  - Total: 3,356
  - Density: 625/sq mi (241/km^{2})
- Time zone: UTC-6 (Central (CST))
  - Summer (DST): UTC-5 (CDT)
- Zip Code: 78735
- FIPS code: 48-05750
- GNIS feature ID: 2407799

Barton Creek is a census-designated place (CDP) in Travis County, Texas, United States. As of the 2020 census, the CDP population was 3,356.

Barton Creek is ranked second in Texas based on per capita income.

== Geography ==
Barton Creek is located approximately 7 miles (11 km) west of downtown Austin.

According to the United States Census Bureau, the CDP has a total area of 5.4 square miles (13.9 km^{2}), all land.

== Demographics ==
Historical population
Census	Pop.	Note	%±
2000	1,589		—
2010	3,077		93.6%
2020	3,356		9.1%
U.S. Decennial Census; 1850–1900 1910; 1920 1930 1940; 1950 1960 1970; 1980 1990 2000; 2010

Barton Creek first appeared as a census designated place in the 2000 U.S. census.

=== Racial and ethnic composition ===
Barton Creek CDP, Texas – Racial and ethnic composition Note: the US Census treats Hispanic/Latino as an ethnic category. This table excludes Latinos from the racial categories and assigns them to a separate category. Hispanics/Latinos may be of any race.
Race / Ethnicity (NH = Non-Hispanic)	Pop 2000	Pop 2010	Pop 2020	% 2000	% 2010	% 2020
White alone (NH)	1,436	2,645	2,736	90.37%	85.96%	81.53%
Black or African American alone (NH)	36	42	32	2.27%	1.36%	0.95%
Native American or Alaska Native alone (NH)	3	10	6	0.19%	0.32%	0.18%
Asian alone (NH)	44	132	134	2.77%	4.29%	3.99%
Native Hawaiian or Pacific Islander alone (NH)	0	0	0	0.00%	0.00%	0.00%
Other race alone (NH)	0	12	9	0.00%	0.39%	0.27%
Mixed race or Multiracial (NH)	11	38	133	0.69%	1.23%	3.96%
Hispanic or Latino (any race)	59	198	306	3.71%	6.43%	9.12%
Total	1,589	3,077	3,356	100.00%	100.00%	100.00%

=== 2020 census ===
As of the 2020 census, Barton Creek had a population of 3,356. The median age was 57.2 years. 16.2% of residents were under the age of 18 and 34.2% of residents were 65 years of age or older. For every 100 females there were 84.7 males, and for every 100 females age 18 and over there were 83.9 males age 18 and over.

100.0% of residents lived in urban areas, while 0.0% lived in rural areas.

There were 1,430 households in Barton Creek, of which 19.9% had children under the age of 18 living in them. Of all households, 66.5% were married-couple households, 9.7% were households with a male householder and no spouse or partner present, and 21.8% were households with a female householder and no spouse or partner present. About 27.0% of all households were made up of individuals and 15.1% had someone living alone who was 65 years of age or older.

There were 1,563 housing units, of which 8.5% were vacant. The homeowner vacancy rate was 2.4% and the rental vacancy rate was 13.1%.

=== 2000 census ===
As of the census of 2000, there were 1,589 people, 707 households, and 509 families residing in the CDP. The population density was 296.4 inhabitants per square mile (114.4/km^{2}). There were 754 housing units at an average density of 140.6 per square mile (54.3/km^{2}). The racial makeup of the CDP was 93.20% White, 2.39% African American, 0.19% Native American, 2.77% Asian, 0.06% Pacific Islander, 0.50% from other races, and 0.88% from two or more races. Hispanic or Latino of any race were 3.71% of the population.

There were 707 households, out of which 22.1% had children under the age of 18 living with them, 67.6% were married couples living together, 3.5% had a female householder with no husband present, and 28.0% were non-families. 22.3% of all households were made up of individuals, and 1.1% had someone living alone who was 65 years of age or older. The average household size was 2.25 and the average family size was 2.63.

In the CDP, the population was spread out, with 17.6% under the age of 18, 4.3% from 18 to 24, 29.5% from 25 to 44, 40.1% from 45 to 64, and 8.5% who were 65 years of age or older. The median age was 44 years. For every 100 females, there were 100.4 males. For every 100 females age 18 and over, there were 101.7 males.

The median income for a household in the CDP was $158,623, and the median income for a family was $172,909. Males had a median income of $100,000 versus $44,716 for females. The per capita income for the CDP was $110,504. About 1.3% of families and 3.6% of the population were below the poverty line, including none of those under the age of eighteen or sixty-five or over.

== Education ==
All of the CDP is in the Austin Independent School District. It is zoned to Oak Hill Elementary School, O'Henry Middle School, and Austin High School.

The private Catholic school St. Michael's Catholic Preparatory School is in Barton Creek.
