= List of Texas locations by per capita income =

Texas is ranked twenty-fifth among US states by median household income, with a per capita income of $19,617 (2000).

== Texas counties ranked by per capita income ==
Note: Data is from the 2010 United States Census Data and the 2006-2010 American Community Survey 5-Year Estimates.

Rank	County	Per capita income	Median household income	Median family income	Population	Number of households
1	Collin	$42,220	$83,889	$84,306	782,341	181,970
2	Borden	$40,916	$58,409	$60,536	641	264
3	King	$39,511	$61,563	$80,500	286	113
4	Loving	$37,362	$80,504	$94,785	134	31
5	Kendall	$36,418	$66,655	$80,801	33,410	12,617
6	Rockwall	$33,274	$78,032	$83,639	78,337	26,448
7	Denton	$32,538	$70,622	$86,891	662,614	240,289
8	Fort Bend	$32,016	$79,845	$88,454	585,375	187,384
9	Montgomery	$31,959	$65,620	$76,096	455,746	162,530
10	Comal	$31,862	$64,752	$75,831	108,472	41,363
11	Irion	$31,857	$48,833	$67,604	1,599	653
12	Travis	$31,785	$54,074	$69,646	1,024,266	404,467
13	Edwards	$31,109	$40,163	$44,118	2,002	839
14	Midland	$30,956	$54,945	$64,913	136,872	50,845
15	Hood	$30,687	$54,882	$65,844	51,182	20,795
16	Williamson	$29,663	$68,780	$78,040	422,679	152,606
17	Andrews	$29,605	$48,699	$55,905	14,786	5,259
18	Hemphill	$29,343	$62,159	$76,176	3,807	1,382
19	Roberts	$29,291	$52,500	$61,375	929	359
20	Llano	$29,027	$41,969	$52,880	19,301	9,008
21	Galveston	$28,959	$58,317	$70,870	291,309	108,969
22	Randall	$28,668	$56,041	$70,592	120,725	47,975
23	Parker	$28,539	$61,340	$71,217	116,927	42,069
24	Goliad	$28,120	$51,786	$62,450	7,210	2,868
25	Gillespie	$28,072	$52,682	$62,746	24,837	10,572
26	Brazoria	$27,529	$65,607	$76,018	313,166	106,589
	United States	$27,334	$51,914	$62,982	308,745,538	116,716,292
27	Tarrant	$27,333	$55,306	$65,351	1,809,034	657,134
28	Wheeler	$27,282	$42,909	$54,495	5,410	2,181
29	Kimble	$27,118	$43,429	$52,262	4,607	2,016
30	Kent	$27,021	$47,750	$54,000	808	350
31	Blanco	$27,010	$46,128	$64,353	10,497	4,309
32	Austin	$26,959	$53,263	$62,816	28,417	10,837
33	Fayette	$26,898	$45,450	$56,157	24,554	10,078
34	Harris	$26,788	$51,444	$58,505	4,092,459	1,435,155
35	Chambers	$26,453	$66,764	$74,705	35,096	11,952
36	Somervell	$26,314	$52,135	$68,942	8,490	3,078
37	Dallas	$26,185	$47,974	$53,849	2,368,139	855,960
38	Glasscock	$26,104	$61,184	$68,214	1,226	441
39	Hays	$25,998	$56,353	$74,471	157,107	55,245
40	Aransas	$25,610	$42,179	$51,058	23,158	9,795
41	Washington	$25,464	$43,159	$56,039	33,718	13,037
42	Kerr	$25,454	$43,072	$52,559	49,625	20,550
43	Smith	$25,374	$46,139	$57,225	209,714	79,055
44	Ellis	$25,346	$60,877	$69,000	149,610	50,503
45	Burnet	$25,245	$48,187	$58,045	42,750	16,511
46	Guadalupe	$25,218	$61,274	$69,090	131,533	45,762
47	Stonewall	$25,177	$52,222	$60,227	1,490	642
48	Wilson	$25,149	$60,493	$66,791	42,918	15,009
49	Carson	$24,977	$56,106	$64,746	6,182	2,452
	Texas	$24,870	$49,646	$58,142	25,145,561	8,922,933
50	Lipscomb	$24,839	$52,566	$56,523	3,302	1,263
51	Young	$24,656	$36,900	$50,571	18,550	7,343
52	Hartley	$24,616	$66,583	$71,332	6,062	1,771
53	Clay	$24,565	$50,881	$58,050	10,752	4,319
54	Jackson	$24,337	$47,483	$58,561	14,075	5,284
55	Bandera	$24,249	$44,352	$52,104	20,485	8,564
56	Armstrong	$24,195	$60,530	$64,130	1,901	751
57	Crockett	$24,194	$50,653	$51,250	3,719	1,422
58	Victoria	$24,146	$48,767	$55,013	86,793	32,187
59	Wise	$24,075	$55,207	$63,719	59,127	21,015
60	Hardin	$23,965	$52,755	$61,451	54,635	20,462
61	Kaufman	$23,909	$58,555	$65,761	103,350	34,964
62	Archer	$23,882	$50,891	$63,388	9,054	3,538
63	Franklin	$23,821	$45,625	$55,839	10,605	4,159
64	Johnson	$23,669	$54,954	$61,462	150,934	52,193
65	Cooke	$23,598	$48,899	$57,689	38,437	14,513
66	Brewster	$23,577	$35,799	$56,710	9,232	4,207
67	Mason	$23,555	$38,702	$55,368	4,012	1,754
68	Menard	$23,362	$40,996	$54,074	2,242	994
69	Sutton	$23,325	$56,146	$64,648	4,128	1,550
70	Grayson	$23,242	$46,875	$57,623	120,877	46,905
71	Freestone	$23,235	$44,560	$56,696	19,816	7,259
72	Bexar	$23,225	$47,048	$55,715	1,714,773	608,931
73	Lavaca	$23,168	$41,429	$52,365	19,263	7,808
74	Orange	$23,155	$47,914	$58,019	81,837	31,031
75	Upton	$23,112	$49,234	$54,583	3,355	1,256
76	Lee	$23,074	$46,986	$62,487	16,612	6,151
77	Reagan	$23,028	$54,224	$54,784	3,367	1,156
78	Gregg	$23,024	$43,367	$54,552	121,730	45,798
79	Lampasas	$22,943	$46,378	$54,500	19,677	7,539
80	Bastrop	$22,918	$51,829	$60,012	74,171	25,840
81	Baylor	$22,894	$33,459	$49,531	3,726	1,669
82	Ector	$22,859	$45,815	$54,395	137,130	48,688
83	Panola	$22,846	$45,622	$53,070	23,796	9,271
84	Wichita	$22,837	$42,971	$52,514	131,500	49,016
85	Calhoun	$22,835	$43,258	$51,766	21,381	7,766
86	Lubbock	$22,831	$42,562	$54,518	278,831	105,781
87	Gaines	$22,785	$46,393	$53,666	17,526	5,606
88	Haskell	$22,734	$35,295	$41,806	5,899	2,297
89	Bell	$22,722	$48,618	$55,191	310,235	114,035
90	Colorado	$22,676	$41,145	$52,526	20,874	8,182
91	Matagorda	$22,623	$43,205	$48,508	36,702	13,894
92	Taylor	$22,606	$42,403	$53,500	131,506	50,725
93	Nueces	$22,558	$43,280	$52,736	340,223	124,587
94	Oldham	$22,504	$51,111	$59,444	2,052	691
95	Leon	$22,484	$40,355	$51,730	16,801	6,896
96	Hamilton	$22,429	$40,808	$50,335	8,517	3,442
97	Scurry	$22,424	$42,401	$52,431	16,921	5,838
98	Rusk	$22,392	$46,574	$54,843	53,330	18,476
99	Shackelford	$22,346	$46,629	$56,058	3,378	1,367
100	Montague	$22,328	$42,482	$55,373	19,719	7,989
101	Terry	$22,306	$39,498	$48,279	12,651	4,200
102	Callahan	$22,300	$44,596	$49,850	13,544	5,447
103	Bowie	$22,293	$42,550	$53,819	92,565	34,669
104	Tom Green	$22,292	$41,398	$53,584	110,224	42,331
105	Jefferson	$22,095	$42,293	$52,625	252,273	93,441
106	Harrison	$22,019	$44,425	$54,598	65,631	24,523
107	Jeff Davis	$22,007	$43,750	$49,635	2,342	1,034
108	Upshur	$21,946	$44,403	$54,592	39,309	14,925
109	Collingsworth	$21,726	$39,712	$50,679	3,057	1,179
110	Wood	$21,682	$41,277	$50,923	41,964	17,118
111	Hunt	$21,646	$43,101	$52,975	86,129	32,076
112	Waller	$21,621	$47,324	$52,899	43,205	14,040
113	Sherman	$21,587	$50,069	$59,148	3,034	1,081
114	Henderson	$21,580	$39,779	$49,108	78,532	31,020
115	Palo Pinto	$21,551	$41,095	$48,655	28,111	10,871
116	Live Oak	$21,540	$43,719	$52,083	11,531	4,257
117	Milam	$21,509	$39,035	$50,797	24,757	9,408
118	San Jacinto	$21,453	$46,285	$52,267	26,384	10,096
119	Burleson	$21,379	$43,185	$57,002	17,187	6,822
120	McMullen	$21,358	$41,453	$52,857	707	310
121	Jack	$21,349	$46,801	$60,365	9,044	3,136
122	Schleicher	$21,299	$55,186	$59,141	3,461	1,182
123	Bosque	$21,269	$45,288	$50,568	18,212	7,254
124	Hopkins	$21,163	$41,642	$53,041	35,161	13,308
125	Ochiltree	$21,143	$49,309	$60,409	10,223	3,617
126	Robertson	$21,113	$38,393	$45,265	16,622	6,541
127	Hansford	$21,095	$52,239	$56,875	5,613	2,006
128	Hutchinson	$21,075	$42,213	$50,255	22,150	8,812
129	Wharton	$21,049	$41,148	$50,077	41,280	15,132
130	Brazos	$21,018	$37,898	$57,383	194,851	71,739
131	Van Zandt	$20,989	$43,074	$51,373	52,579	20,047
132	Erath	$20,903	$39,200	$50,718	37,890	14,569
133	Rains	$20,855	$42,491	$49,643	10,914	4,377
134	Delta	$20,837	$37,908	$50,847	5,231	2,088
135	San Patricio	$20,766	$45,189	$52,856	64,804	22,637
136	Throckmorton	$20,677	$36,339	$43,478	1,641	721
137	McLennan	$20,652	$40,672	$51,191	234,906	86,892
138	Sterling	$20,640	$41,548	$50,690	1,143	440
139	Medina	$20,604	$49,138	$56,860	46,006	15,530
140	Lamar	$20,588	$38,015	$49,256	49,793	19,829
141	Brown	$20,586	$38,832	$47,976	38,106	14,778
142	Gray	$20,567	$40,442	$49,479	22,535	8,443
143	Hill	$20,554	$39,293	$50,716	35,089	13,238
144	Navarro	$20,539	$41,654	$49,120	47,735	17,380
145	Fisher	$20,516	$41,458	$51,895	3,974	1,668
146	Mills	$20,438	$31,895	$45,848	4,936	1,975
147	Knox	$20,375	$32,055	$47,292	3,719	1,506
148	Morris	$20,292	$38,843	$49,549	12,934	5,226
149	Hockley	$20,255	$46,430	$53,461	22,935	8,242
150	Fannin	$20,221	$44,551	$55,083	33,915	12,149
151	Crane	$20,185	$50,425	$57,500	4,375	1,471
152	Cass	$20,137	$36,360	$44,360	30,464	12,429
153	Donley	$20,137	$46,130	$59,306	3,677	1,517
154	Hall	$20,126	$29,219	$36,452	3,353	1,372
155	Marion	$20,125	$29,943	$40,634	10,546	4,595
156	McCulloch	$20,116	$34,459	$45,901	8,283	3,338
157	Angelina	$20,104	$39,148	$47,536	86,771	31,090
158	Shelby	$20,103	$32,425	$40,172	25,448	9,648
159	Runnels	$20,056	$37,823	$42,307	10,501	4,165
160	Ward	$20,055	$41,117	$46,613	10,658	3,995
161	DeWitt	$20,020	$40,668	$50,742	20,097	7,407
162	Nolan	$19,973	$37,102	$48,316	15,216	5,999
163	Yoakum	$19,937	$49,146	$51,241	7,879	2,643
164	Wilbarger	$19,916	$40,105	$45,365	13,535	5,289
165	Trinity	$19,828	$36,814	$44,600	14,585	6,142
166	Motley	$19,754	$34,081	$41,688	1,210	542
167	Lynn	$19,752	$43,672	$48,271	5,915	2,246
168	San Saba	$19,721	$36,308	$41,362	6,131	2,257
169	Martin	$19,695	$38,111	$45,842	4,799	1,649
170	Stephens	$19,573	$35,691	$46,142	9,630	3,665
171	Tyler	$19,450	$35,346	$41,112	21,766	8,007
172	Winkler	$19,309	$41,828	$48,393	7,110	2,578
173	Jasper	$19,182	$38,062	$44,593	35,710	13,770
174	Dallam	$18,940	$47,073	$51,135	6,703	2,448
175	Coryell	$18,936	$47,374	$51,999	75,388	22,545
176	Terrell	$18,871	$35,403	$40,893	984	430
177	Houston	$18,813	$31,929	$43,742	23,732	8,656
178	Liberty	$18,807	$45,929	$52,951	75,643	25,073
179	Potter	$18,725	$36,766	$43,331	121,073	42,933
180	Gonzales	$18,716	$37,094	$45,361	19,807	7,120
181	Camp	$18,710	$36,029	$42,023	12,401	4,678
182	Dickens	$18,642	$33,813	$47,500	2,444	930
183	Refugio	$18,638	$42,949	$52,527	7,383	2,841
184	Kleberg	$18,580	$36,571	$46,772	32,061	11,097
185	Atascosa	$18,461	$42,927	$48,485	44,911	15,246
186	Limestone	$18,420	$42,140	$51,631	23,384	8,499
187	Coke	$18,384	$38,702	$52,667	3,320	1,466
188	Foard	$18,368	$30,417	$40,089	1,336	573
189	Bailey	$18,275	$42,375	$50,684	7,165	2,468
190	Moore	$18,239	$44,216	$50,372	21,904	7,197
191	Nacogdoches	$18,180	$33,189	$44,771	64,524	23,861
192	Sabine	$18,155	$33,589	$38,681	10,834	4,738
193	Caldwell	$18,106	$41,594	$50,553	38,066	12,301
194	Red River	$18,105	$37,047	$43,945	12,860	5,469
195	Floyd	$18,093	$35,240	$42,782	6,446	2,402
196	Comanche	$18,086	$35,218	$45,391	13,974	5,580
197	Eastland	$17,973	$32,452	$42,492	18,583	7,465
198	Crosby	$17,940	$36,301	$41,922	6,059	2,237
199	Uvalde	$17,842	$35,087	$39,327	26,405	9,025
200	Howard	$17,832	$39,574	$53,289	35,012	11,333
201	Concho	$17,731	$49,063	$54,083	4,087	1,041
202	Newton	$17,721	$37,452	$47,023	14,445	5,476
203	Briscoe	$17,652	$34,196	$41,932	1,637	692
204	Lamb	$17,553	$35,458	$39,977	13,977	5,081
205	Titus	$17,520	$39,423	$43,872	32,334	10,813
206	Anderson	$17,465	$40,378	$52,235	58,458	17,218
207	Hardeman	$17,401	$36,295	$37,969	4,139	1,722
208	Cottle	$17,385	$33,859	$38,906	1,505	677
209	Grimes	$17,365	$39,429	$50,514	26,604	8,902
210	Cherokee	$17,230	$36,966	$45,432	50,845	17,894
211	San Augustine	$17,184	$25,974	$38,461	8,865	3,625
212	Jim Hogg	$17,163	$40,000	$43,409	5,300	1,902
213	Jim Wells	$16,976	$37,020	$42,515	40,838	13,961
214	Polk	$16,961	$33,325	$38,360	45,413	16,503
215	Parmer	$16,926	$39,753	$43,836	10,269	3,413
216	El Paso	$16,768	$36,333	$40,329	800,647	256,557
217	Pecos	$16,717	$38,125	$46,917	15,507	4,894
218	Deaf Smith	$16,687	$41,127	$48,780	19,372	6,365
219	Kenedy	$16,655	$48,333	$56,339	416	147
220	Val Verde	$16,615	$36,993	$39,912	48,879	15,654
221	Swisher	$16,513	$37,907	$50,399	7,854	2,762
222	Coleman	$16,494	$26,951	$33,718	8,895	3,857
223	Childress	$16,338	$42,004	$49,635	7,041	2,326
224	Hale	$16,322	$36,509	$44,128	36,273	11,846
225	Garza	$16,185	$35,750	$51,642	6,461	1,671
226	Castro	$16,073	$35,087	$38,390	8,062	2,744
227	Culberson	$16,060	$35,500	$41,250	2,398	908
228	Cochran	$16,018	$37,446	$42,601	3,127	1,113
229	Karnes	$15,949	$39,611	$47,917	14,824	4,463
230	Jones	$15,880	$39,568	$50,888	20,202	6,034
231	Presidio	$15,635	$29,513	$33,276	7,818	2,906
232	Dawson	$15,288	$33,623	$47,561	13,833	4,385
233	Duval	$15,134	$30,493	$37,429	11,782	4,090
234	Real	$15,074	$29,186	$34,167	3,309	1,374
235	Frio	$15,036	$35,940	$42,111	17,217	4,854
236	Falls	$14,979	$31,083	$42,877	17,866	6,302
237	Brooks	$14,728	$19,959	$25,710	7,223	2,642
238	Madison	$14,245	$37,207	$46,943	13,664	4,187
239	Kinney	$14,207	$24,388	$30,833	3,598	1,350
240	Bee	$14,188	$40,278	$46,061	31,861	9,042
241	Webb	$14,163	$36,684	$38,521	250,304	67,106
242	Dimmit	$14,045	$25,882	$30,595	9,996	3,421
243	Walker	$13,920	$34,259	$47,219	67,861	20,969
244	Zapata	$13,915	$24,496	$26,406	14,018	4,297
245	Cameron	$13,695	$31,264	$33,770	406,220	119,631
246	La Salle	$13,542	$30,144	$35,352	6,886	1,931
247	Hidalgo	$13,480	$31,879	$34,106	774,769	216,471
248	Mitchell	$13,358	$37,260	$46,131	9,403	2,809
249	Reeves	$13,112	$32,593	$36,728	13,783	3,839
250	Maverick	$12,444	$28,813	$32,199	54,258	15,563
251	Starr	$11,659	$24,441	$28,143	60,968	17,001
252	Hudspeth	$11,485	$22,647	$28,125	3,476	1,174
253	Willacy	$10,800	$22,881	$25,399	22,134	5,764
254	Zavala	$10,180	$21,707	$24,768	11,677	3,573

== See also ==
- Highest-income counties in the United States
- Lowest-income counties in the United States
