= List of killings by law enforcement officers in the United States, June 2015 =

This is a list of people reported killed by non-military law enforcement officers in the United States in June 2015, whether in the line of duty or not, and regardless of reason or method. The listing documents the occurrence of a death, making no implications regarding wrongdoing or justification on the part of the person killed or officer involved. Killings are arranged by date of the incident that caused death. Different death dates, if known, are noted in the description. The table below lists 77 people.

== June 2015 ==
Date	Name (Age) of Deceased	State (City)	Description
2015-06-30	Lickteig, Clay (52)	North Carolina (Franklin)	Clay Lickteig threatened and fought with Franklin Police officers who were serving him with a felony arrest warrant at this home. During the confrontation officers tased Lickteig and when he shot at the officers they returned fire, killing him. The District Attorney ruled that the officers were justified in killing Lickteig.
2015-06-29	LaPort, Richard (51)	New York (Northville)	After Laport called 911 reporting that he wanted to kill himself, officers from the Saratoga County Sheriff's office and New York State Police responded. During a standoff LaPort fired his shotgun several times. When he pointed his shotgun at the officers they shot and killed him. The Saratoga County District Attorney cleared the officers.
2015-06-28	Bellew, Alan Lee (29)	Oregon (Portland)	Portland Police officers were questioning three people next to their car in a supermarket shopping lot. Police say had been called to the store by a report of a fight. During the questioning, Bellew pulled a starter's gun from the car and pointed it at the officers. They shot and killed him.
2015-06-28	McIntire, William Dale (60)	Florida (Tampa)	McIntire was drunk and lying in the road about midnight when he was run over by Tampa Police Officer Jeremy Dabush. A relative of McIntire's says police told him that Dabush did not realize he had hit anyone and continued driving. The Florida State Attorney's office investigate the incident and decided not to charge Dabush with a crime.
2015-06-27	Crittenden, Joshua (35)	Oklahoma (Tahlequah)	When Tahlequah Police officers arrived at a fight between two men, both ran. One, unarmed, was arrested on outstanding warrants. Crittenden hid in an attic and when he came out he shot at the officers. Officer Randy Tanner shot Crittenden who died a short time later at a hospital.
2015-06-26	Cisneros, Joe Angel	Texas (San Antonio)	Cisneros was pulled over for a traffic violation near John Jay High School where officers were conducting surveillance. When Cisneros ran from the scene an undercover officer pursued him on foot. Police say when Cisneros attempted to climb over a fence a gun fell from his waistband and that when he reached for the gun the officer shot and killed him.
2015-06-26	Matt, Richard (49)	New York (Malone)	Matt, a convicted killer, had escaped from the Clinton Correctional Facility in Dannemora, New York, on June 6, 2015. Convicted killer David Sweat escaped with him at the same time. For several weeks, Matt and Sweat led authorities on a manhunt that gained national attention. Matt was eventually discovered about 40 miles from Dannemora, and was shot and killed by a tactical team from U.S. Customs and Border Protection.
2015-06-25	Vanderburgh, Gilbert(61)	California (Madera County)	An auto-theft task force from the Fresno County Sheriff Department and the California Highway Patrol followed a man driving a stolen vehicle into the remote foothills of Madera County near Hildreth about 4 AM on June 25, 2015. The two occupants realized they were being followed and when they arrived home they ran into the house. The officers surrounded the house and called for them to come out. One man stood at a window, shouted at the officers, and pointed a rifle toward them. A sheriff's deputy fired two shots from his rifle, killing Gilbert Vanderburgh. A second man fled but was being sought by officers.
2015-06-25	McCain, Spencer (41)	Maryland (Owings Mills)	Three Baltimore County Police officers responding to a domestic disturbance call shot and killed Spencer McCain. One of the children at the home had called her grandmother, who called 911. Police arrived, heard screams from inside, and forced their way in. When police encountered McCain they shot and killed him. No weapon was found.
2015-06-24	Harrell, Damien Alexander (26)	Virginia (Yorktown)	York-Poquoson Sheriff deputies investigating a single-car accident were questioning Harrell but he would not give them his real name. Eventually he pulled a gun on them. The deputies shot and killed him. Officials later discovered that he was wanted on several charges.
2016-06-23	Waddell, Randall Tabor (49)	Texas (Weatherford)	Weatherford police and an ambulance responded to a report of a "suspicious" man tripping and falling in a traffic median. The suspect pulled a knife on the paramedics (who had arrived first) and walked into a nearby business. A police officer found him in the store and there was a confrontation. The officer shot Waddell who died at a hospital. Waddell's family later told the media that he was deaf and mentally ill.
2015-06-23	Culbertson, Taylor (32)	Nebraska (Omaha)	When a convenience store clerk told Douglas County Sheriff's Deputy Chad Miller that customer Culbertson appeared to be drunk, the deputy went to check Culbertson in his vehicle outside the store. As the deputy approached Culbertson got out of the vehicle pointing an automatic pistol at Miller. Miller fired two or three shots, wounding Culbertson. Culbertson died in a hospital on August 9.
2015-06-23	Wilson, Jonathan P. (22)	Kansas (Hutchinson)	A call to 911 reported that Wilson had confessed to a murder and was armed with a knife. Hutchinson Police officers responded and found Wilson with three small children in the residence. Wilson was agitated, threatening the officers and breaking windows while police got the children out of the house. Officers fired their rifles, killing Wilson.
2016-06-23	Dyer, Joshua (34)	Indiana (Indianapolis)	Officers from the Indianapolis Metropolitan Police Department approached a car that was parked in an unauthorized area. The car sped off and there was a chase of several blocks until the car crashed. When the driver backed up officers fired into the car, killing Joshua Dyer, the passenger.
2015-06-22	Reyes, Eduardo (35)	California (Citrus Heights)	Eduardo Reyes was shot and killed by Citrus Heights Police officers responding to a report of a domestic dispute. Police were told that Reyes was beating his wife and was armed with a handgun. When police arrived Reyes shot at them from a second-story landing at the apartment. Four police officers shot and killed Reyes.
2015-06-22	Wicks, Tyler (30)	Georgia (Augusta)	Richmnond County Sheriff's Deputies responded to a call about a man with a gun. The suspect was inside a home, armed with a rifle, and threatening to shoot law enforcement officers. The deputies several times ordered him to put down the weapon but he did not comply. Tyler Wicks was shot by one of the deputies. He was taken to a hospital where he died.
2015-06-22	Barrett, James Monroe (60)	North Carolina (Ronda)	When he exchanged gunfire with law enforcement officers investigating a domestic dispute Barrett was shot and killed. Barrett, who had wounded two civilians before the officers arrived, also wounded a Wilkes County Sherriff's Sergeant.
2015-06-22	Harris, Tyrone Dale, Jr. (20)	Pennsylvania (Pittsburgh)	Officers from Pittsburgh Police, Alleghany County Sheriff, and the Port Authority responded to reports of a man firing an AR-15 type rifle on city streets and carjacking a vehicle. Tyrone Harris, who had had problems with drug use, was killed in a shootout with Pittsburgh Police and transit officers.
2015-06-21	Simental, Adrian (24)	California (Azusa)	Azusa Police responded to a call of a man acting bizarrely who had injured himself and broken into a neighbor's home. An officer found Simental, injured and bleeding, lying on the back patio. Police report he said, "Shoot me." While the officer was holding him at gunpoint, Simental suddenly stood up. The officer shot and killed him. The medical examiner found an elevated level of methamphetamine in Simental's body. The District Attorney found insufficient evidence that the officer acted unlawfully.
2015-06-21	Hernandez, Allen (23)	Idaho (Homedale)	Hernandez was involved in a traffic accident and he went to a nearby home, letting himself in. After receiving permission to call 911 Hernandez got into a fight with the residents. When deputies from the Owyhee County Sheriff's Office arrived Hernandez struggled with them. While police held him down Hernandez stopped breathing and was taken to a hospital where he died two days later.
2015-06-21	Marshall, Charles David (49)	Texas (Houston)	Harris County Sheriff's Deputies responding to a woman's call about he husband who was drunk and hurting himself arrived at the apartment to find Marshall a cordless power drill. Marshall asked the officer if he was going to kill him. When Marshall refused to put the drill down Sergeant Ben Russell shot and killed him.
2015-06-20	Cockerham, Alfontish (23)	Illinois (Chicago)	Cockerham was shot by Chicago Police Officer Anthony Babicz who was responding to a report of a man with a gun. Babicz chased Cockerham when he ran from a group of four men as the officer approached. A police official says that Cockerham pointed a gun at Officer Babicz. Cockerham died June 25. Some witnesses and Cockerham's family dispute the police account of the shooting. Laquida Cockerham, his widow, filed a lawsuit against the City of Chicago and Officer Anthony Babicz.
2015-06-19	Atencio, Louis (50)	Colorado (Greeley)	Greeley Police officers responding to a report of a "bloody woman asking for help" encountered Atencio in the street, armed with a handgun. Officers say that when Atencio pointed the weapon at them, they shot him.
2015-06-19	Hummons, Trepierre (21)	Ohio (Cincinnati)	Hummons called 911 to report "a black man...getting belligerent with a gun." When the first Cincinnati Police Officer, Sonny Kim, arrived, Hummons engaged him in a firefight, shooting and mortally wounding Kim. Hummons shot at Spc. Thomas Sandman, the second officer to arrive, but Sandman was able to shoot Hummons. Both Hummons and Kim died at Cincinnati Medical Center. The Cincinnati Police Chief said it was "suicide by cop." Hummons had been charged with a sex crime earlier that day.
2015-06-19	Laboy, Santos	Massachusetts (Boston)	Santos Laboy was fatally shot by state troopers on Storrow Drive after Laboy brandished a knife at police officers. Police spotted Laboy who had outstanding warrants. Laboy then fled when police approached.
2015-06-18	Tcherniak, Oleg (58)	New York (New York)	In the Brighton Beach neighborhood, a man tried to wrestle a woman, who he had a dispute with earlier at a store, at the Ocean Parkway subway platform. A 24-year-old NYPD officer, with two years of experience, arrived on the scene and was slashed and injured in the neck by the suspect after be pulled out an 11-inch hunting knife. The officer then fired two shots in the suspect's torso, killing him. The woman suffered minor injuries and the officer suffered non-life threatening injuries with stitches to the wounds.
2015-06-17	Lanphier, Kenneth (48)	New Mexico (Hobbs)	Four officers from the Hobbs Police Department responded to a call about a suicidal man. Lanphier was armed with a gun and shot at the police. During the exchange of gunfire a fifty-three year old woman, believed to be Lanphier's roommate was struck by gunfire and later died. Police shot and killed Lanphier.
2015-06-17	Chappell, Wendy Michelle (40)	Alabama (Clanton)	Local and State Alabama law enforcement officer used spike strips to stop Chapelle's vehicle after her husband reported that she had threatened to shoot him. Once Wendy Chappell was stopped there was a brief standoff, then she pointed her weapon at officers who shot and killed her. The Alabama State Bureau of Investigation was investigating the incident.
2015-06-16	DeLeon, Chris (28)	California (Visalia)	Visalia Police were investigating an empty building which had been used by transients. They heard a gunshot and saw DeLeon running from the building with a weapon in his hand. When he failed to put down the weapon as ordered, police shot and killed him.
2015-06-16	Charboneau, Joe (31)	North Dakota (Fort Totten)	Tribal Police and a Bureau of Indian Affairs (BIA) Police Officer on the Spirit Lake Indian Reservation were searching a home to serve a warrant. Joe Charboneau was also in the home, covered by a blanket. Police say that when the officers saw that he was holding a pistol they ordered him to drop it. When he did not drop the weapon BIA Police Officer Terry Morgan shot and killed him. Federal prosecutors found that the shooting was legally justified.
2015-06-15	Jackson, Kris (22)	California (South Lake Tahoe)	A single bullet fired by a South Lake Tahoe police officer in the early morning hours of June 15 killed Kris Jackson, 22, of Sacramento. Jackson was trying to flee out of a window at the Tahoe Hacienda Inn when fired upon. No weapon was found.
2015-06-15	Higgenbotham, Kevin (47)	New Jersey (Trenton)	Trenton Police responding to a call about a verbal dispute used pepper spray and their batons on Kevin Higgenbotham. He remained in a coma until he died 13 March 2016 at a Trenton hospital.
2015-06-15	Seidle, Tamara (51)	New Jersey (Asbury Park)	Neptune, New Jersey Police Sergeant Philip Seidle shot and killed his estranged wife Tamara Seidle. Philip Seidle (51) pled guilty aggravated to manslaughter and child endangerment in return for a prison term of less than life.
2015-06-14	Garcia, Kenneth (28)	California (Stockton)	Stockton police officers saw Garcia inside a truck hitting a woman. They tried to approach him but he drove away and a high-speed chase ensued. Once police had stopped Garcia and got out to walk toward his vehicle, he drove toward the officers. They responded with gunfire, hitting him several times. Garcia was taken to a hospital where he died.
2015-06-14	Terryn, Zane (15)	Florida (Cocoa)	Zane Terryn and his sixteen-year-old girlfriend were in her pickup at a rest stop off Interstate 95 when a Florida Highway Patrol officer noticed their headlights weren't working. The officer had approached the driver's side of the truck where the girl sat to talk to her about the light when Terryn pulled a handgun from under the seat and fired several times, wounding the officer. The officer shot back, killing Terryn. Authorities say that the two had formed a suicide pact.
2015-06-13	Boulware, James (35)	Texas (Hutchins)	Boulware opened fire on the Dallas Police Department headquarters and placed explosives around the building. He escaped in his armored van, but was stopped by police in a parking lot in Hutchins. After a standoff, Boulware was shot by a police sniper.
2015-06-13	Hodge, Anthony W. (46)	Indiana (Fort Wayne)	When Anthony Hodge, armed with a handgun, was causing a disturbance, neighbors called police. Fort Wayne Police officers arrived at Hodge's home and he met them at the door armed with a handgun. After he refused several times to put down the weapon, the a police officer shot and killed him. Hodge had previously been charged with resisting police and with intimidation with the use of a deadly weapon. The Allen County Prosecutor cleared Officer Nicholas Lichtsinn, ruling the shooting as self-defense.
2015-06-13	Payne, James Jr (51)	Ohio (Clayton)	Clayton Police Officer Mark Gau driving a patrol car, struck Payne who was on his motorcycle. After a review by the Montgomery County Processor Officer Gau was charged with vehicular manslaughter.
2015-06-13	Manyoun, Deng (35)	Kentucky (Louisville)	Louisville Police Officer Nathan Blanford stopped his car and approached Deng Manyoun, a pedestrian, because Manyoun matched the description of an assault suspect. A video shows that Manyoun, apparently agitated, walked off camera and returned with a flagpole which he used to strike the officer. Blanford retreated as he was struck several times, then shot and killed Manyoun. The Commonwealth of Kentucky Attorney General's office reported it will not pursue any criminal charges against Blanford in the case.
2015-06-13	Blakley, Candace L. (24)	South Carolina (North Augusta)	Aiken County Sheriff's Deputy Matthew Blakley was arrested for shooting and killing his wife, Candace, at their home. Deputy Blakley was charged with involuntary manslaughter.
2015-06-13	Williams, Alan Craig (47)	South Carolina (Greenville)	Williams was riding his moped on Poinsett Highway when he was struck from behind and killed by a patrol vehicle driven by a Greenville County Sheriff Deputy. Williams' family has filed a lawsuit.
2015-06-12	Haendiges, Shelly Lynn (17)	Indiana (Kokomo)	Kokomo Police officer Roy Smith responded to a report of an armed robbery at a convenience store and encountered Haendiges pointing a gun at a store clerk. When she pointed the gun at the officer he shot and killed her. The gun turned out to be a CO2 powered pellet gun. The County Prosecutor ruled that Officer Smith acted reasonably and in self defense. The family reported that their daughter suffered from mental illness and was a psychiatric outcare patient.
2015-06-11	Flores, Mark Anthony, Jr. (28)	Texas (San Antonio)	After he was shot by his son, Mark Flores went to his neighbors who called police. He was still outside his house when four Bexar County Sheriff Deputies arrived and went inside. Authorities say that when the deputies encountered the son he shot at them, striking one deputy in the arm. Two of the deputies then shot and killed him. Both parents believe their son was schizophrenic.
2015-06-11	Phillips, Raymond K. (86)	Tennessee (Columbia)	Police were called about a man who had left home with his car and weapons threatening suicide. Police pulled him over and say he exited his car pointing guns at officers, who fatally shot him.
2015-06-11	Severe, Fritz (46)	Florida (Miami)	Fritz Severe, a homeless black man, was shot five times and killed by Miami Police officer Antonio Torres. Police say that Severe was threatening the officer with a metal pipe.
2015-06-11	Ziegler, Charles Allen (40)	Florida (Pompano Beach)	Receiving a tip about the location of bank robbery suspect Ziegler, Broward County Sheriff Deputies went to the home and followed him to a parking lot. When they attempted to arrest Ziegler, he grabbed a handgun from the floor of his car. Four deputies shot and killed him.
2015-06-11	Peralta-lantigua, Raymond (19)	New York (Bronx)	Peralta-lantigua was "going crazy" damaging things around his mother's apartment. She locked herself in her bedroom and dialed 9-1-1, reporting that he had a knife. He threw a rock at the first police car to respond and rushed a second officer with the knife, before being fatally shot by police.
2015-06-10	Hampton, Isiah (19)	New York (Bronx)	Officers responding to a domestic violence call found a 19-year-old woman shot in the arm. They say the armed suspect pointed a gun at officers, who fired back, fatally striking him in the chest.
2015-06-09	Hartley, Gregory Scott (45)	Texas (Tomball)	Hartley, wanted on a felony warrant and armed with a pistol grip shotgun was shot and killed by officers from the Tomball Police Department and the Montgomery County Sheriff's Department when he got out of his vehicle after a high-speed pursuit and pointed the shotgun at them. The pursuit had begun after police had received a report of a driver pointing a shotgun at other drivers.
2015-06-09	Bolinger, Ryan Keith (28)	Iowa (Des Moines)	Bolinger pulled up beside a patrol car that was pulled over for an unrelated traffic stop. He was close enough that he blocked the cruiser's driver side door. Bolinger got out of his own car and danced around before getting back in and driving away. Officer Vanessa Miller was not amused and pursued him, along with another cruiser. When Bolinger was forced to stop his car, he got out and started walking "with a purpose" toward Miller's cruiser. Miller fatally shot him through her own rolled-up driver's side window. Bolinger was unarmed and it's not clear what "purpose" is alleged.
2015-06-09	Howard, Randy (65)	Tennessee (Lynchburg)	Bail enforcement officer Jackie Shell, who is also a former police officer, attempted to take country singer Howard into custody for outstanding warrants. Howard opened fire on Shell, wounding him. Shell returned fire, killing Howard.
2015-06-09	Hicks, QuanDavier (22)	Ohio (Cincinnati)	Officers went to the man's home on a complaint. He came to the front door and officers engaged in a brief struggle with him. Police said he reached for a rifle, at which point they fatally shot him.
2015-06-09	Linhart, Jeremy J. (30)	Ohio (Findlay)	Linhart was a passenger during a traffic stop in which he and the driver were ordered to get out of the car, and both complied. Linhart attempted to get back into the car and was shot in a scuffle with the officer. Police say they found a gun in the car.
2015-06-08	Garcia, Rene (30)	California (Anaheim)	Garcia, whose family reports he has had mental health issues, stopped his truck near Anaheim motorcycle officer Steve Anderson, who was conducting a traffic stop. Garcia had a butcher knife in hand when he ran toward the officer, swearing at him. Officer Yesenia Escobar was nearby on a separate task when she saw Garcia running toward Anderson. Garcia did not obey Anderson's orders to stop, but ran past him, toward Escobar. Both Anderson and Escobar fired multiple shots, killing Garcia.
2015-06-08	Warolf, Richard (69)	Arizona (Sun City)	Maricopa County Sheriff's deputies responded to a 911 call from a woman who said her husband, who was armed, had been drinking and was threatening suicide. Once they had arrived at the residence the deputies negotiated for three hours during which the man did come outside the home occasionally. The deputies distracted him with a percussive device and when he was distracted they rushed at him. He then pointed his gun at deputies who shot and killed him.
2015-06-08	Anthony, Ross Allen (25)	Texas (Dallas)	Anthony was "exhibiting erratic behavior" including running through traffic, band striking vehicles with his hands. When Dallas Police officers tried to remove him from a vehicle he resisted and one of the officers tased him. After being handcuffed Anthony showed signs of "medical distress." Emergency workers took him to a hospital where he died.
2015-06-08	Johnson, James (54)	Indiana (Beech Grove)	Beech Grove Police officers went to the scene of a reportedly suicidal person and found Johnson, armed with a gun. Johnson, sitting on a porch, waved the gun saying "shoot me." Not complying with orders to drop the gun, Johnson walked toward the officers. When he pointed the weapon at them they shot and killed him. Neighbors said that Johnson had a history of mental illness.
2015-06-08	McDaniel, Matthew Wayne (35)	Florida (Melbourne)	Six Melbourne Police officers followed McDaniel, a robbery suspect, to a Burger King parking lot. They blocked in his car and when he got out of the car police say he waved a gun. Police shot and killed him.
2015-06-08	Ocasio, Mario (51)	New York (Bronx)	New York City Police responded to a call from Ocasio's girlfriend that he was high on drugs and acting erratically. Police say when they arrived he was brandishing scissors. Officers tased him and placed him in handcuffs. He went into cardiac arrest and was pronounced dead at a Bronx hospital.
2015-06-07	Marshall, Gene (53)	Washington (Woodland)	Marshall's wife called 911 to report that Marshall was armed and suicidal. Officer Terry Casey arrived and when Marshall approached Casey with a handgun, Casey shot Marshall dead.
2015-06-06	Fernandez, Alejandro Campos (45)	California (Watsonville)	Officers had set up surveillance of Fernandez, hoping to apprehend him away from the home as they expected he would have firearms with him. Fernandez ran away and ignored officers' orders to stop. After running along a trail, he kneeled and shot at an officer, who was struck in the upper torso, blocked by a bulletproof vest. A second officer joined in fatally shooting Fernandez. The hit officer was treated at a hospital and released.
2015-06-06	Smillie, James (53)	Florida (North Port)	Sgt. Mike Laden shot Smillie when Smillie allegedly reached for an unidentified weapon during a negotiation stand-off. The two had previously been talking on a cell phone connection after response to a domestic dispute. Smillie had previously complied with police orders to put down a rifle.
2015-06-06	Hogg, Demouria (30)	California (Oakland)	Officers spotted a man sleeping in a stolen car. He woke up in response to bullhorns and bean bag rounds and a metal pipe smashing the passenger side glass, but would not get out. There was a loaded gun on the passenger seat, though it's not clear if he used it at all. He was also shocked with a taser and fatally shot with a gun.
2015-06-06	Ramirez, Damien James (27)	Colorado (Strasburg)	While an Arapahoe County Sheriff's deputy was investigating an accident on Interstate 70, a state trooper noticed a walking man carrying a gun. The man hijacked a vehicle and fled. About fourteen miles away the man rolled the hijacked SUV. As he got out of the vehicle, still armed several law enforcement officers arrived. There was an exchange of gunfire and the suspect was killed by a Sheriff's deputy. Damien James Ramirez was wanted on two outstanding warrants. The District Attorney investigated and found the officers' actions justified.
2015-06-06	Nevels, Joe Don (42)	Texas (Midland)	When a man was walking in and out of a liquor store, acting suspiciously, a store employee called police. Midland Police officers responded and encountered the man, carrying a box cutter, outside the store. Police say he was shot and killed when he charged at the officers, threatening them with the box cutter.
2015-06-05	Cathers, Christie L. (45)	West Virginia (Morgantown)	Deputies responded to a call about a person with a knife. Cathers allegedly tried to run over a deputy and fled the scene. Deputies pursued and Cathers struck a deputy's cruiser. A deputy then shot Cathers dead.
2015-06-05	Gomez, Jesus Quezada (50)	California (Santa Maria)	Santa Maria police responded to a call from Gomez that he had stabbed his wife, he was armed and he intended to shoot anyone nearby. Officers responded with an armored vehicle and when Gomez came out of the house armed with a pistol and a rifle or shotgun they tried to negotiate. They attempted to subdue him with a less than lethal round but that missed. When Gomez pointed the rifle in the direction of the officers two of them fired their rifles. He was mortally wounded and died at a local hospital. His wife was found dead in the house. The Santa Barbara County District Attorney found the shooting justified.
2015-06-04	Ellerbe, Andrew (33)	Pennsylvania (Philadelphia)	An off-duty detective was waiting for food at a pizzeria when Ellerbe and an accomplice attempted to rob him of $20, putting a gun to his head and forcing him to the ground. When they turned around to the owner and employee at a counter, the officer identified himself and pulled out a gun. The suspect fired two blanks at the officer, who then fatally shot Ellerbe. The accomplice fled.
2015-06-03	Garza, Lorenzo Jr. (46)	California (Delano)	Officers responded to reports of criminal threats and a drive-by shooting. Officers began to pursue a specifically identified suspect, who took off in a vehicle, firing at officers during the pursuit. Officers fired back, killing Garza. No officers were injured; 11 fired their weapons.
2015-06-03	Baca, Rudy (36)	New Mexico (Los Lunas)	After a call from Rudy Baca's mother, Valencia County Sheriff's deputies went to make a welfare check on Baca, who had been drinking. When deputies arrived the convince Baca to come outside but there was a confrontation and a deputy shot and mortally wounded Baca who died June 4 at a hospital.
2015-06-03	Hernandez, Edelmiro (33)	Texas (Houston)	A Houston Police officer on patrol near an apartment complex saw a vehicle matching the description of one associated with recent burglaries of the complex. The driver of the large SUV noticed the officer and drove away. There was a pursuit which ended when the vehicle crashed and was disabled. Two officers ordered the driver out of the SUV but he did not comply. After a twenty-minute standoff they sent in a police dog and when the suspect tried to hurt the dog with his knife, the officers shot and killed him.
2015-06-03	Martinez, Miguel (18)	Texas (Forreston)	Martinez and his brother Daniel Dankert (23) were pulled over by Italy, Texas Police for a traffic violation, handcuffed, and placed in the back seat of the police SUV. Martinez climbed into the front seat and drove off in the police vehicle. During the hour-long pursuit a police officer negotiated with Martinez over the vehicle's police radio. When Martinez finally stopped the vehicle a gunshot was heard from inside the vehicle then Martinez got out holding a gun. The police shot and killed him. Daniel Dankert died in the vehicle but it is unclear if his death was suicide or homicide.
2015-06-03	Byrd, Sherman (24)	Pennsylvania (Chester)	A woman reported that she was robbed of her cellphone and cash at gunpoint. Deputies heard a radio alert and spotted an armed man matching the description on a bicycle. Officers pursued and a patrol car hit the suspect, killing him.
2015-06-03	Neal, Ronald (56)	New Jersey (Byram Township)	Byram police received a call at 3:38 PM saying that a man had barricaded himself in his home and that he was armed. SWAT teams dispatched to the location. Neal, who lived in the home with his wife, was killed by a Byron police officer.
2015-06-02	Rahim, Usaama (26)	Massachusetts (Boston)	Rahim was under 24-hour surveillance by the FBI for death threats against police. At 7 am, according to authorities, officers encountered Rahim in a CVS parking lot in the Roslindale neighborhood and attempted to question him over the alleged threats. Police allege that Rahim pulled out a military-style knife and brandished it at the officers, the officers demanded Rahim drop the knife, and then discharged their firearms. Surveillance video is not sufficient to confirm or deny this. Rahim died later that day in a hospital.
2015-06-01	Ladd, Joseph M. (23)	New York (Greece)	Police were looking for a missing and possibly suicidal person, and found him in a mall parking lot. Officer Eric Hughes identified himself to the man and an altercation began. At some point, Hughes felt threatened and fatally shot the man.
2015-06-01	Dajani, Kamal (26)	Texas (Azle)	Dajani, a stabbing suspect, was shot at least once by a Tarrant County sheriff's deputies when he was reportedly stabbing a woman and refused to drop the knife inside his family's home.

== See also ==
- Death in custody § United States
- Henry A. Wallace Police Crime Public Database
- List of cases of police brutality
- List of countries with annual rates and counts for killings by law enforcement officers
- List of law enforcement officers killed in the line of duty in the United States
- List of law enforcement officers convicted for an on-duty killing in the United States
- List of shootings by US immigration agents
- List of police reforms related to the George Floyd protests
- List of unarmed African Americans killed by law enforcement officers in the United States
- Lists of killings by law enforcement officers
- Police brutality in the United States
- Police misconduct § United States
- Police riot § United States
- Police use of deadly force in the United States
