= Henry Clay Daulton =

American rancher and public official

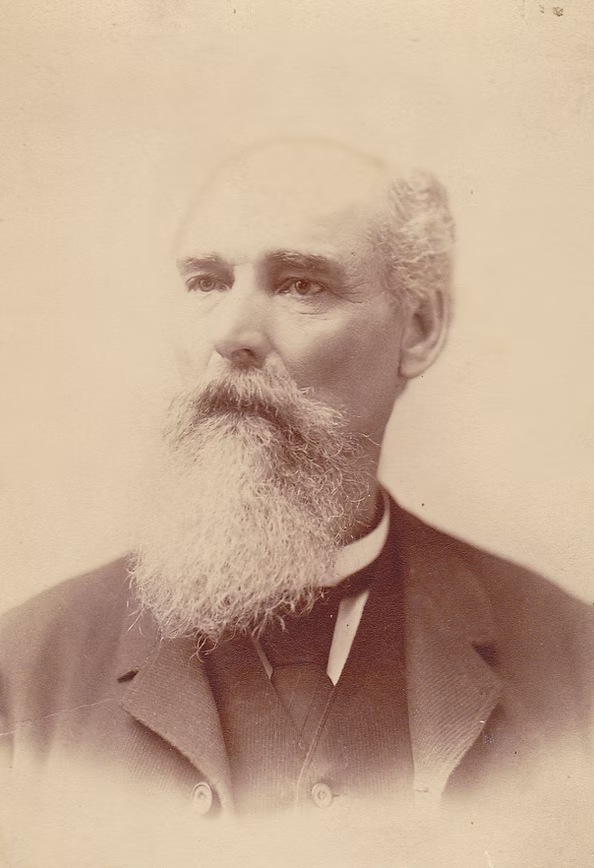
Daulton in 1893

Henry Clay Daulton (7 April 1827 – 28 October 1893) was an American rancher and public official who helped to create Madera County, California.

== Life ==
Daulton was born in Maysville, Kentucky 7 April 1827, eighth among ten children to James and Naomi Daulton. His father was a veteran of the War of 1812 and his grandfather a veteran of the American Revolution. When he was an infant, his family moved to the frontier town of Hannibal, Missouri to escape economic trouble, where they lived in a log cabin. Starting young, he worked as a farmhand. A series of family deaths, including his parents, sent him and his brothers looking for work outside Hannibal. He left in 1850 to join the California Gold Rush with his brother Wakeman by wagon train, arriving in August in El Dorado County. He prospected for two years until, seeing merchants making more money than miners, he returned east via Panama to purchase sheep and cattle.

Daulton traveled back overland with Thomas Hildreth's party, of which he was the second-in-command, arriving in Los Angeles in November 1853. On this journey he found some gold in the Rocky Mountains. The party was also attacked by Indians, but they fended them off. He settled his flock into the first sheep and cattle ranch in what would become Fresno County, in an area twelve miles north of what is now Madera. In 1865, he established another homestead and called it Shepherd's Home. He acquired, having purchased government land, a total of approximately 18,000 acres. Since the No Fence Law of 1874 required ranchers to build fences, he hired coolies who had worked on the railroad to build fencing on his ranch. He also allowed Southern Pacific Railroad to build a branch through his land. In 1889, he sold his ranch and livestock and tried to move to Oakland, but the buyer of his land, David S. Terry, could not actually pay, so Daulton retook the ranch after a court battle with the estate of recently-killed Terry and restocked the livestock. It was passed through his family after his death.

Daulton married Thomas Hildreth's sister, Mary Jane Hildreth, at the San Gabriel Mission, and had ten children. Daulton attended a Methodist congregation. He was a member of the Blue Lodge, the Order of the Eastern Star, the Odd Fellows and the Rebekahs.

=== Politics ===
He was elected justice of the peace of Los Angeles County in 1854. In 1860 he was elected supervisor of Fresno County and held that office until 1875, and again from 1878 for another term. In 1865 he was made Associate Justice of the Court of Sessions and held the office until 1875. In 1875 he also served as president of the Bank of Fresno. He ran as a candidate for the American Party for California State Senate, but the party was weak and he did not win office.

When the idea for the formation of Madera County was proposed, he became its leading advocate, chairing the election commission for the vote on the issue. Opposition came from ranchers in the hills afraid of flatlanders near Madera controlling the county's politics, as well as people in what would remain of Fresno County. In defense of the proposal, he was quoted,

This county is too big at the present day—large enough almost to make two states. We now have two daily papers in Madera and we simply ask you to let us go in peace. I hope when I die I will die within the borders of old Fresno County. We want a divorce from you and we don't want you to pay any alimony.

In May 1893, residents voted in favor of forming the county. Daulton was made chairman of the Board of Supervisors of the new Madera County, a post which he held until his death.

== Death ==
On 28 October 1893, while returning home from Madera, his leg was caught in his buggy and he was dragged on the road for six miles. His leg was found broken in sixty places and the top of his head was torn off.

At his funeral, more than a hundred buggies lined up, the total cortege being more than a mile long. The fraternal organizations of which he was a member participated in his funeral.

He is a member of the Hall of Great Westerners, inducted in 1958.
