= Ben Ash =

Ben Ash may refer to:

- Ben Ash, musician professionally known as Two Inch Punch
- Ben C. Ash (1851–1946), American pioneer
