= Okanogan =

Okanogan (US) or Okanagan (Canada) may refer to:

== People and regions ==
- Okanagan Country, a divided region in British Columbia and Washington
- Okanagan people, a Native American (US) or First Nations (Canada) people, known as the Syilx in their own language
- Okanagan language

== Canada ==
- Okanagan (also Okanagan Valley), a region of British Columbia
- Okanagan Basin, watershed in British Columbia and Washington
  - Okanagan Lake, British Columbia, a lake forming the core of the region in British Columbia
  - Okanagan River (same as Okanogan River), river in British Columbia and Washington
- Okanagan Valley (wine region), the wine region around Okanagan Lake
- Okanagan Mountain Provincial Park, British Columbia (Okanagan Mountain is also a suburban area of Kelowna, British Columbia)
- Okanagan Trail, 1858 trail to the Fraser Canyon Gold Rush from Oregon
- Okanagan Highland, upland plateau area in British Columbia and Washington State
- Okanagan Range, a subrange of the Cascade Range spanning the border between British Columbia and Washington State
- Okanagan (electoral districts), current and historical federal and provincial electoral districts
- Regional District of Okanagan-Similkameen, a regional district of British Columbia
- Regional District of Central Okanagan, a regional district of British Columbia
- Regional District of North Okanagan, a regional district of British Columbia

== United States ==
- Okanogan, Washington, a city in Okanogan County, Washington
- Okanogan River (same as Okanagan River), in British Columbia and Washington; a tributary of the Columbia River
- Okanogan County, Washington, a county in north-central Washington
- Okanogan Complex fire, a group of wildfires in Okanogan county during August–September 2015
- Okanogan–Wenatchee National Forest, Washington state
- Fort Okanogan, a Pacific Fur Company outpost in Washington, established 1811 (North West Company from 1813, Hudson's Bay Company from 1821)

== Other ==
- Hiram F. "Okanogan" Smith (1829–1893), American settler in the Pacific Northwest
- HMCS Okanagan, a submarine that served in the Royal Canadian Navy
