= Jeffers (disambiguation) =

Jeffers is a surname.

Jeffers may also refer to:

- Jeffers, Minnesota, a small city in the United States
- Jeffers, Montana, a census-designated place in the United States
- Jeffers Petroglyphs in Minnesota
- USS Jeffers (DD-621)
- Audrey Jeffers Highway in Trinidad and Tobago
- Jeffers High School in Painesdale, Michigan, United States
