= Myron D. Jeffers =

Cowboy, stockman and homesteader in Southwest Montana in late 1800s

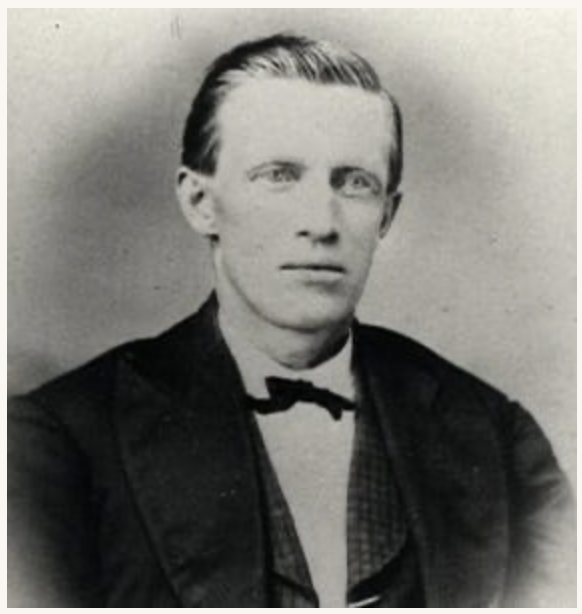
Montana cattleman Myron D. Jeffers as a young man, ca. 1869-71.

Myron Deodat ("M.D.") Jeffers (September 16, 1833 - May 27, 1900) was an American cattleman and rancher, known for his three drives of cattle from Texas to southwest Montana, and for his contributions to the livestock industry in southwest Montana in the late 1800s. He was inducted into the Hall of Great Westerners in 1963. He established the community of Jeffers, Montana.

== Early life ==
Myron D. Jeffers was born September 16, 1833, near Hadley, Saratoga County, New York. He was the eldest of nine children.

== Career ==
Jeffers was inducted in 1963 into what was then called the “Cowboy Hall of Fame” (now renamed the “Hall of Great Westerners” of the “National Cowboy & Western Heritage Museum”) in recognition of two accomplishments:

- his three drives of cattle from Texas to southwest Montana in the years 1869, 1870, and 1871, which were the first such drives known to have been completed in a single year, and
- his involvement in — and contributions to — the livestock industry in southwest Montana in the late 1800s.

He kept a succinct diary of his 1871 cattle drive.

== Personal life ==
Myron Jeffers married Florence E. Switzer in 1878 and had five sons.

== Death and legacy ==
He died from a brain tumor on May 27, 1900, in New York City and was buried in the Madison Valley Cemetery in Ennis, Montana.

The community of Jeffers, in Madison County, southwest Montana is named after him.
