= Warren Lale Blizzard =

American educator and stockman

- Born: 8 April 1888; McPherson, Kansas
- Died: 3 July 1954 (aged 66)
- Education: Kansas State University

Warren Lale Blizzard (8 April 1888 – 3 July 1954) was an American educator, stockman, and livestock judge who promoted the livestock industry in Oklahoma by promoting better sires.

== Early life ==
Blizzard was born to teamster John W. Blizzard and Zaidee L. Blizzard in McPherson, Kansas on 8 April 1888. He had 5 siblings. His family grew some wheat. Blizzard was a football player at McPherson High School and a middling student. He began at Kansas State University in 1907, graduating with a B.S. in animal husbandry in 1910.

== Career ==
He worked for a time as an assistant in animal husbandry at Kansas State University, a fieldman for Capper Publications, and at Iowa State College, until in 1915 he joined the Oklahoma A&M Animal Husbandry Department in 1915 as a professor. From 1919 to 1943 he was department head of animal husbandry and from 1939 to 1950 he was dean of the agriculture school, succeeding Carl P. Blackwell, who died in 1937. Blizzard promoted the idea that carefully choosing sires would produce livestock that was cheaper to raise and sold at a higher price. He promoted this idea at 4-H and Future Farmers of America livestock shows.

He was noted for his ability to choose such sires, and served as a judge at numerous livestock shows, including the Eastern States Exposition, Great Western Livestock Show, Ak-Sar-Ben Stock Show, National Western Stock Show, Territorial Fair of Hawaii and the state fairs of Oklahoma, Ohio, South Dakota, Kansas, as well as for anniversary shows for the Aberdeen Angus, Hereford cattle, and Shorthorn breed associations. He is credited with a significant increase in the productivity of Oklahoma's livestock industry, which became the eighth highest earning state for livestock in the 1930s. He expanded the herds of Oklahoma A&M, adding several breeds of cattle and forming the sheep and swine herds.

== Personal life ==
He married Alta Marie Hanlin in 1915 and was a Presbyterian. He was a Shriner, a Scottish Rite Mason, and a Rotarian. His portrait was added to the Saddle & Sirloin Portrait Collection in 1939 and he inducted to the Hall of Great Westerners in 1958. He died after an illness on 3 July 1954.
