= Otto Barby =

American rancher

Otto Carl Barby (1865 – 1954) was an American rancher and homesteader active in the Oklahoma Panhandle remembered for advocating for the cattle industry so that the prairie grasses would be preserved to prevent dust storms.

== Early work and personal life ==
Barby was born in St. Louis, Missouri in 1865 and grew up around Dodge City, Kansas. At 15 he worked on cattle drives in the Oklahoma Panhandle and the historic Kiowa and Comanche territories in the 1890s. He homesteaded in what would become Beaver County in the Oklahoma Territory in 1884, 11 years before its admission as a state. He lived in a dugout with his wife, operating a ranch.

He was a member of American Legion. His first wife, Mary Beede, died in 1912. He was survived by Helen Hughes after he died at home in 1954.

== Ranching ==
Most Oklahoma settlers of this time were farming cash crops and destroying prairie grasses to do so, leaving a layer of exposed dirt susceptible to further wind erosion and dust storms. As his neighbor's farms failed, he bought them out to grow his ranch operations. The blizzard of 1912 destroyed $10,000 worth of his cattle. During the drought in the 1930s, he sold cows that could have gone for $90 cows for $18. He built one of Oklahoma's largest ranches at 80,000 acres. After his death, his family continued his ranching operations, eventually accumulating 165,000 acres.

He was appointed deputy director of the Oklahoma State Council of Defense assisting in home front efforts in Harper, Ellis, Woodward, Cimarron, Texas, and Beaver counties.

He was inducted into the Hall of Great Westerners in 1958.
