= Hall of Great Westerners =

Hall of Fame for Cowboys

Coordinates: 35°32′08″N 97°28′59″W

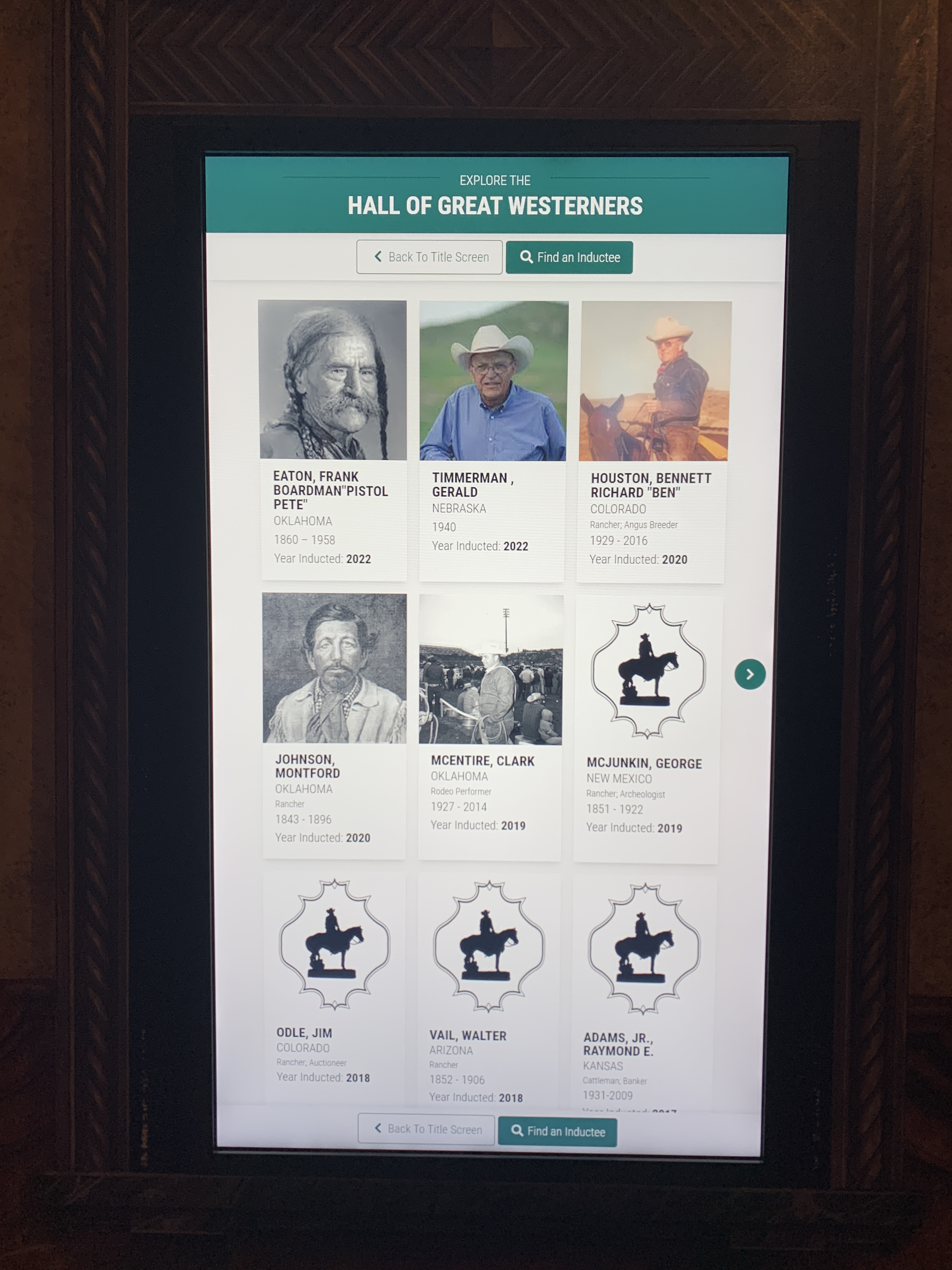
- Established: 1955
- Location: Oklahoma City, Oklahoma, US
- Type: Hall of fame
- Website: OfficialSite

The Hall of Great Westerners was established by the National Cowboy & Western Heritage Museum in 1958. Located in Oklahoma City, Oklahoma, U.S., the Hall was created to celebrate the contributions of more than 200 men and women of the American West. Inductees include explorers, Native American leaders, writers, poets, politicians, statesmen and others.

== List of members ==
The following are Hall of Great Westerners inductees, followed by their birth and death dates, the year they were inducted, areas of influence, and occupations.

| Name | Lifespan | Inducted | Area(s) of influence | Notes |
|---|---|---|---|---|
| Jasper D. Ackerman | 1896–1988 | 1978 | Colorado | Cattleman; Rancher; Banker; Philanthropist |
| Horace Greeley Adams, Sr. | 1862–1933 | 1997 | Kansas | Businessman; Farmer; Cattleman |
| Raymond E. Adams, Jr. | 1931–2009 | 2017 | Kansas | Cattleman, Banker |
| Ramon Ahumada | 1868–1926 | 1958 | Arizona | Rancher |
| Pedro Altube | 1826–1904 | 1960 | Nevada | Father of Basques in America; Rancher |
| George Washington Arrington | 1844–1923 | 2003 | Texas | Texas Ranger; Ranch Manager |
| Ben C. Ash | 1851–1946 | 1959 | South Dakota | Frontiersman; Peace Officer |
| Stephen Fuller Austin | 1793–1836 | 1958 | Texas | Colonizer; Secretary of the Republic of Texas; Rancher |
| Gene Autry | 1907–1998 | 1980 | Texas/Oklahoma | Entertainer |
| William Hugh Baber | 1893–1968 | 1971 | California | Livestock and Farming |
| Charles Monroe Bair | 1857–1943 | 1975 | Montana | Livestock |
| Malcolm Baldridge | 1922–1987 | 1984 | Nebraska | U.S. Secretary of Commerce |
| Otto Carl Barby | 1865–1954 | 1958 | Oklahoma | Homesteader; Conservationist |
| Squire Omar Barker | 1894–1985 | 1978 | New Mexico | Poet; Author |
| Will Croft Barnes | 1858–1936 | 1961 | Arizona | Cowman; Politician; Writer: Medal of Honor Recipient |
| Edward Fitzgerald Beale | 1822–1893 | 1958 | At Large (California) | Surveyor; Indian Agent; Ranch |
| Henry Bellmon | 1921–2009 | 2005 | Oklahoma | Governor; Senator |
| William W. Bent | 1809–1869 | 1960 | Colorado | Frontiersman; Indian Trader |
| Thomas Matthew Berry | 1879–1951 | 1962 | South Dakota | Cattleman; Political Leader |
| Fred Hathaway Bixby | 1875–1952 | 1958 | California | Rancher; Philanthropist; Livestock Official |
| Warren Lale Blizzard | 1888–1954 | 1958 | At Large (Oklahoma) | Animal husbandry |
| Charles Boettcher | 1852–1948 | 1963 | Colorado | Businessman; Banker; Rancher |
| Frank Seymour Boice | 1894–1956 | 1958 | At Large (Arizona) | Rancher; Cattle Industry Leader |
| John Edward Borein | 1872–1945 | 1971 | At Large (California) | Western Artist |
| Lewis Rice Bradley | 1806–1879 | 1959 | Nevada | Cattleman; Governor |
| John P. Bratt | 1842–1918 | 1958 | Nebraska | Rancher; Politician; Land Developer |
| Jim Bridger | 1804–1881 | 1976 | At Large | Trapper; Frontiersman; Scout |
| Dolph Briscoe, Jr. | 1923–2010 | 2004 | Texas | Rancher; Philanthropist; Governor |
| Lucas Charles Brite | 1860–1941 | 1997 | Texas | Livestock Breeder |
| Lieutenant General Charles W. Brown | 1932–2007 | 2014 | Nebraska | Rancher; Military |
| Ernest J. Browning | 1899–1984 | 1991 | Arizona | Quarter Horse |
| J.M. Buckley | 1878–1962 | 1964 | North Dakota | Cowboy; Horseman; Ranch Forman |
| Samuel Burk Burnett | 1849–1922 | 1969 | Texas | Cattleman; Rancher |
| Thomas Loyd Burnett | 1871–1938 | 1978 | Texas | Cattleman |
| Holm Olaf Bursum | 1867–1953 | 1965 | New Mexico | Rancher; Civic Leader |
| Wina Rae Calhoon | 1894–1986 | 2004 | Oklahoma | Pioneer; School Teacher |
| Joseph Maull Carey | 1845–1924 | 1959 | Wyoming | Territorial and State Official, U.S. Senator; Rancher |
| Henry Hallowell Carizonaier | 1885–1963 | 1965 | Nevada | Civic Leader; Rancher; Businessman |
| Floyd Eugene Carroll | 1893–1969 | 1998 | Wyoming | Veterinarian; Stunt rider |
| Christopher "Kit" Houston Carson | 1809–1868 | 1959 | At Large (Colorado) | Expedition Guide; Frontiersman |
| Dan Dillon Casement | 1868–1953 | 1958 | Kansas | Cattleman; Live Stock Association Organizer |
| Willa Sibert Cather | 1873–1947 | 1974 | Nebraska | Novelist; Writer |
| Ralph Chain | 1927 | 2011 | Oklahoma | Cattleman; Agro-Tourism Pioneer |
| James Allen Chapman | 1881–1966 | 1968 | Oklahoma | Oil Pioneer; Philanthropist |
| Jesse Chisholm | 1805/1806–1868 | 1974 | At Large (Oklahoma) | Scout; Trader; Interpreter |
| John Simpson Chisum | 1824–1884 | 1958 | New Mexico | Cattleman; Trail Driver |
| Jean Pierre Chouteau | 1758–1849 | 1975 | At Large (Oklahoma) | Fur Trader; Indian Agent; Frontiersman |
| William Clark | 1770–1838 | 1965 | At Large (Virginia) | Military Officer; Co-leader of Lewis and Clark Expedition |
| Badger Clark | 1883–1957 | 1989 | South Dakota | Cowboy Poet |
| Joshua Reuben Clark, Jr. | 1871–1961 | 1962 | Utah | Farmer; Cattleman; Politician |
| Al Clarkson | 1866–1957 | 1961 | South Dakota | Horse Breeder; Cattleman |
| John Clay | 1851–1934 | 1961 | At Large | Cattleman; Businessman |
| William "Buffalo Bill" Frederick Cody | 1846–1917 | 1958 | At Large (Nebraska) | Pony Express Rider; Scout; Showman |
| Charles Franklin Coffee | 1847–1935 | 1966 | Nebraska | Rancher; Banker; Cattleman |
| Charles Francis Colcord | 1859–1934 | 1959 | Oklahoma | Rancher; City Builder; Civic Leader |
| Charles E. Collins | 1869–1944 | 1960 | Colorado | Cowboy; Cattleman |
| William Connolly | 1861–1946 | 1963 | North Dakota | Rancher |
| James Henry Cook | 1857–1942 | 1960 | Nebraska | Trail Driver; Scout; Rancher |
| James Taylor Craig | 1862–1930 | 1963 | South Dakota | Cattleman |
| Edward Creighton | 1820–1874 | 1958 | Nebraska | Telegraph Builder |
| Matt Crowley | 1875–1955 | 1960 | North Dakota | Cattleman; Conservationist; Public Official |
| Victor Culberson | 1863–1930 | 1958 | New Mexico | Cattleman |
| Alex Currie | 1859–1937 | 1959 | North Dakota | Stockman; Horse and Cattle Breeder |
| Charles Franklin Curtiss | 1863–1947 | 1959 | At Large (Iowa) | Dean of agriculture; Livestock Breeder |
| James Charles Dahlman | 1856–1930 | 1964 | Nebraska | Mayor; Cattleman; Sheriff |
| Harry Darby | 1895–1987 | 1978 | Kansas | Industrialist; Senator; Rancher |
| Henry Clay Daulton | 1829–1893 | 1958 | California | Rancher; Miner; Public Official |
| J. Leslie Davis | 1919–2001 | 2000 | New Mexico | Rancher |
| Linda Mitchell Davis | 1930 | 2000 | New Mexico | Rancher |
| Arthur Armstrong Denny | 1822–1899 | 1962 | Washington | Founder of Seattle; Merchant; Public official |
| James Frank Dobie | 1888–1964 | 1965 | Texas | Author; Texas Folklorist |
| Grenville Mellen Dodge | 1831–1916 | 1963 | At Large | Soldier; Engineer; Railroad Builder; Author |
| Don Manuel Dominguez | 1803–1882 | 2005 | California | Rancher; Businessman; Politician |
| Lewis W. Douglas | 1894–1974 | 2002 | Arizona | Politician; Public Servant |
| Fred H. Dressler | 1898–1997 | 1982 | Nevada | Cattleman |
| Frederick F. Drummond | 1931 | 2006 | Oklahoma | Cattleman; Banker |
| Kenneth Eade | 1906–2000 | 2013 | California | Rancher; Stockman |
| Wes C. Eade | 1874–1960 | 1961 | California | Cattleman |
| Frank Boardman "Pistol Pete" Eaton | 1860-1958 | 2022 | Oklahoma | Scout; Cowboy |
| Howard Eaton | 1851–1922 | 1983 | Wyoming | Dude Rancher |
| Newton Edmunds | 1819–1908 | 1964 | South Dakota | Territorial Governor |
| Dwight David Eisenhower | 1890–1969 | 1973 | At Large | Military General; U.S. President |
| John Evans | 1814–1897 | 1963 | Colorado | Physician; Businessman; Public official |
| W.D. Farr | 1910–2007 | 2007 | Colorado | Rancher; Banking; Water Development |
| Thomas "Broken Hand" Fitzpatrick | 1799–1854 | 2004 | Missouri | Fur Trader; Mountain Man; Indian Agent |
| William Jordan Flake | 1839–1932 | 1959 | Arizona | Colonizer; Cattleman |
| Calvin W. Floyd | 1872–1955 | 1958 | Kansas | Cattleman; Banker |
| James William Follis | 1865–1950 | 1967 | North Dakota | Cattleman |
| Robert Simpson Follis | 1842–1914 | 1958 | Montana | Cattleman |
| Don Juan Forster | 1814–1882 | 1996 | California | California Ranchero |
| Dr. O.M. Franklin | 1886–1973 | 2011 | Texas | Cattleman; Research Veterinarian |
| John Charles Fremont | 1813–1890 | 2000 | California | Explorer |
| Peter French | 1849–1897 | 1966 | Oregon | Cattleman |
| Robert A. Funk Sr. | 1940 | 2023 | Oklahoma | Businessman |
| John Warne Gates | 1855–1911 | 1972 | At Large | Promoter; Speculator; Industrialist |
| Edward King Gaylord | 1873–1974 | 1974 | Oklahoma | Publisher; Philanthropist |
| Amadeo Peter Giannini | 1870–1949 | 1963 | California | Banker |
| William Thomas Gilcrease | 1890–1962 | 1971 | Oklahoma | Oilman; Banker; Art Collector |
| Barry Morris Goldwater | 1909–1998 | 1991 | Arizona | Senator; Presidential Candidate |
| John W. Goodall | 1857–1931 | 1958 | North Dakota | Cattleman; Sheriff |
| Frank Robert Gooding | 1859–1929 | 1958 | Idaho | Stockman; Public Official |
| John Goodman | 1920 | 2014 | Arizona | Horse Breeder and Trainer |
| Charles Goodnight | 1836–1929 | 1955 | At Large (Texas) | Cowman; Plainsman |
| Temple Grandin, Ph.D. | 1947 | 2012 | Colorado | Animal scientist, autism activist, author |
| George Grant | 1822–1878 | 1961 | Kansas | Colonizer; Cattleman |
| Pearl Zane Grey | 1872–1939 | 1977 | At Large | Author |
| Enrique Guerra | 1929–2016 | 2016 | Texas | Longhorn breeder |
| John Hailey | 1835–1921 | 1958 | Idaho | Stockman; Public official; Plainsman |
| John Dickinson Hale | 1847–1929 | 1966 | South Dakota | Cattleman; Political leader |
| James Evetts Haley | 1901–1995 | 1990 | Texas | Author |
| Jacob Hamblin | 1819–1886 | 1958 | Utah | Mormon Missionary; Colonizer |
| Clifford P. Hansen | 1912–2009 | 1995 | Wyoming | Banker; Rancher; Politician |
| Jesse C. Harper | 1883–1961 | 1962 | Kansas | Cattleman |
| Howard C. Haythorn | 1929 | 2008 | Nebraska | Cattleman; Quarter Horse Breeding |
| George Hearst | 1820–1891 | 1996 | California | Philanthropist |
| Phoebe Hearst | 1927–2012 | 1996 | California | Philanthropist |
| James Jerome Hill | 1838–1916 | 1958 | At Large (Minnesota) | Railroad Builder |
| Montford T. Johnson | 1843-1896 | 2020 | Oklahoma | Rancher |
| James Fielding Hinkle | 1862–1951 | 1964 | New Mexico | Cattleman |
| James Kerrick Hitch | 1855–1921 | 1962 | Oklahoma | Rancher |
| Henry Charles Hitch, Sr. | 1884–1967 | 1972 | Oklahoma | Cattleman |
| Harold T. Holden | 1940 | 2017 | Oklahoma | Artist |
| George Ward Holdrege | 1847–1926 | 1965 | Nebraska | Railroad Builder; Cattleman |
| D.C. "Rusty" Holler | 1920–1999 | 1997 | Wyoming | Rancher |
| Cyrus Kurtz Holliday | 1826–1900 | 1960 | At Large (Kansas) | Railroad Builder; Town Founder |
| William Welles Hollister | 1818–1886 | 1959 | California | Stockman; Civic Developer |
| John M. Holt | 1848–1913 | 1960 | Montana | Cattleman |
| Henry Clay Hooker | 1828–1907 | 1960 | Arizona | Cattleman |
| Matthew "Bones" Hooks | 1867-1951 | 2021 | Texas | Horsebreaker |
| Bennett Richard "Ben" Houston | 1929-2016 | 2020 | Colorado | Breeder |
| Samuel Houston | 1793–1863 | 1960 | At Large (Texas) | Soldier; Statesman |
| Laton Alton Huffman | 1854–1931 | 1976 | Montana | Photographer |
| John Hughes | 1933–2013 | 2015 | Oklahoma | Cattleman |
| Collis Potter Huntington | 1821–1900 | 1968 | California | Railroad Magnate; Capitalist |
| Samuel Calhoun Hyatt | 1891–1978 | 1978 | Wyoming | Rancher |
| Bose Ikard | 1847–1929 | 1999 | Texas | African American Cowboy; Trail Driver |
| John Wesley Iliff | 1831–1878 | 1960 | Colorado | Cattleman |
| William C. Irvine | 1852–1924 | 1965 | Wyoming | Stockman; Civic Leader; State Developer |
| Anthony Woodward Ivins | 1852–1931 | 1958 | Utah | Cattleman; Church Official; Civic Leader |
| Will James | 1892–1942 | 1992 | Nevada | Writer; Artist |
| Myron D. Jeffers | 1833–1900 | 1963 | Montana | Cattleman |
| Ben Johnson, Sr. | 1896–1952 | 1961 | Oklahoma | Cattleman; Ranchman; Champion Steer roper |
| Charles Jesse "Buffalo" Jones | 1844–1919 | 1959 | Kansas | Plainsman; Buffalo Hunter; Conservationist |
| Tom Jones | 1868–1949 | 1961 | South Dakota | Cattleman; Rancher; Roundup Boss |
| L.L. Jones | 1879–1954 | 1964 | Kansas | Cattleman; Veterinarian |
| Nez Perce Chief Joseph | 1840–1904 | 1973 | At Large (Oregon) | Tribal Leader |
| John S. Justin, Jr. | 1917–2001 | 1999 | Texas | Bootmaker |
| Morell Case Keith | 1823–1899 | 1962 | Nebraska | Cattleman |
| John Benjamin Kendrick | 1857–1933 | 1958 | Wyoming | Governor and U.S. Senator |
| Mifflin Kenedy | 1818–1895 | 1960 | Texas | Cattleman; Rancher; Railroad builder |
| Frank Keogh | 1877–1955 | 1965 | North Dakota | Cattleman |
| Emil C. Kielhorn | 1876–1946 | 1963 | Kansas | Farming; Livestock |
| Richard King | 1824–1885 | 1959 | At Large (Texas) | Founder of King Ranch; Steamboat Captain |
| Adkin Wallace Kingsbury | 1842–1924 | 1971 | Montana | Stockman; Rancher |
| Moses Pierce Kinkaid | 1854–1922 | 1963 | Nebraska | Lawyer; Congressman |
| Eusebio Francisco Kino | 1644–1711 | 1963 | Arizona | Missionary; Explorer; Cattleman; Author; Priest |
| William Kittredge | 1876–1958 | 1966 | Oregon | Rancher |
| Robert Justus Kleberg, Jr. | 1896–1974 | 1975 | Texas | Livestock Breeding; Ranch Management |
| Jesse Knight | 1845–1921 | 1964 | Utah | Stockman; Entrepreneur |
| Carsten Conrad Kohrs | 1835–1920 | 1958 | Montana | Cattleman |
| John Lacey | 1938 | 2013 | California | Rancher; Stockman |
| George Lane | 1856–1925 | 2016 | Alberta | |
| Edward Cunningham Lasater | 1860–1930 | 1961 | Texas | Pioneer Farmer and Rancher |
| Tom Lea | 1907–2001 | 1995 | Texas | Author; Illustrator; Artist |
| George Edward Lemmon | 1857–1946 | 1958 | South Dakota | Cattleman |
| Meriwether Lewis | 1774–1809 | 1965 | At Large | Explorer; Governor |
| Gordon William "Pawnee Bill" Lillie | 1860–1942 | 2010 | Illinois | Performer; Educator; Buffalo Hunter |
| Abraham Lincoln | 1809–1865 | 1972 | At Large | Frontiersman; President |
| Frank Bird Linderman | 1869–1938 | 2007 | Montana | Historian; Writer; Ethnologist |
| Hewlett Mortimer Lott | 1827–1920 | 1965 | Montana | Miner; Civic Developer |
| Oliver Loving | 1812–1867 | 1958 | Texas | Cattleman |
| Solomon Luna | 1858–1912 | 1963 | New Mexico | Stockman; Sheepman |
| John Thomas Lytle | 1844–1907 | 1966 | Texas | Rancher |
| John Mabee | 1879–1961 | 1996 | Texas, Oklahoma | Petroleum Industry |
| Murdo MacKenzie | 1850–1939 | 1981 | Colorado | Cattle Industry |
| Daniel Manning | 1845–1914 | 1961 | North Dakota | Cattleman; Rancher; Farmer; Miner |
| Anne W. Marion | 1938 | 1981 | Texas | Rancher; Philanthropist |
| Sallie Reynolds Matthews | 1861–1938 | 1981 | Texas | Author; Pioneer |
| Watkins "Watt" Reynolds Mattews | 1899–1997 | 1990 | Texas | Cattleman |
| Lucien Bonaparte Maxwell | 1818–1875 | 1959 | New Mexico | Cattleman; Banker |
| Jake McClure | 1902–1940 | 1955 | At Large (Texas) | Rancher; Rodeo Performer |
| Joseph Geiting McCoy | 1837–1915 | 1967 | Kansas | Cattleman; Author |
| William M. "Billy" McGinty | 1871–1961 | 2000 | Oklahoma | Rough Rider; Wild West Show Performer |
| Charles Herbert McLeod | 1859–1946 | 1964 | Montana | Merchant |
| Otto Mears | 1840–1931 | 1964 | Colorado | Pathfinder; Tollroad and Railroad Builder |
| Clark McEntire | 1927–2014 | 2019 | Oklahoma | Rodeo Performer |
| George McJunkin | 1851–1922 | 2019 | New Mexico | Rancher, Archeologist |
| Nathan Cook Meeker | 1814/1817–1879 | 1970 | Colorado | Newspaperman; Colonizer |
| Walter F. Merrick | 1911–2006 | 2003 | Oklahoma | Horseman |
| Henry Miller | 1827–1916 | 1958 | At Large (California) | Developer; Rancher |
| George Lee Miller | 1881–1929 | 1983 | Oklahoma | 101 Ranch |
| Joseph Carson Miller | 1868–1927 | 1983 | Oklahoma | Wild West Show; Ranching |
| Zachary Taylor Miller | 1878–1952 | 1983 | Oklahoma | Wild West Show; Ranching |
| Thomas Edward Mitchell | 1863–1934 | 1962 | New Mexico | Pioneer Cattleman |
| Albert Knell Mitchell | 1896–1980 | 1977 | New Mexico | Rancher; Cattleman |
| William Henry Moffatt | 1875–1963 | 1964 | Nevada | Stockman |
| Earl Harrison Monahan | 1899–1991 | 1990 | Nebraska | Rancher |
| John "Tex" Marcellus Moore | 1865–1950 | 1964 | Texas | Cowboy; Artist |
| Bob Moorhouse | 1947 | 2010 | Texas | Rancher; Horse Breeder; Photographer |
| Esther Hobart Slack Morris | 1814–1902 | 1973 | Wyoming | Women's Suffrage |
| Burton C. "Cap" Mossman | 1867–1956 | 1960 | New Mexico | Stockman |
| John Muir | 1838–1914 | 2006 | California | Conservationist; Writer |
| John Walker Myers | 1825–1901 | 1960 | Wyoming | Pioneer Trader; Cattleman |
| Sam Noble | 1925–1992 | 1996 | Oklahoma | Oilman; Philanthropist |
| Robert C. Norris | 1929 | 2014 | Colorado | Rancher; Horse Breeder |
| Frank Joshua North | 1840–1885 | 1958 | Nebraska | Military Leader; Cattleman |
| Sandra Day O'Connor | 1930-2023 | 2001 | Arizona | Judge; Businesswoman |
| Charles M. O'Donel | 1860–1933 | 1966 | New Mexico | Ranch Manager |
| Jim Odle | 1938 | 2018 | Colorado | Rancher; Auctioneer |
| Charles Bruce Orvis | 1858–1955 | 1962 | California | Veterinarian; Stockman |
| Richard Roy Owens | 1881–1953 | 1960 | California | Cattleman |
| William Jackson Palmer | 1836–1909 | 1962 | At Large | Railroad Builder |
| John Palmer Parker | 1790–1868 | 2008 | Hawaii | Rancher; Conservationist; Industrialist |
| Peter Pauly | 1871–1953 | 1968 | Montana | Cattleman; Banker |
| William A. Paxton | 1837–1907 | 1961 | Nebraska | Cattleman; Railroad Construction |
| Chester Paxton | 1909–2000 | 1998 | Nebraska | Rancher |
| Dave D. Payne | 1871–1969 | 1971 | Texas | Cattleman |
| Spencer Penrose | 1865–1939 | 2001 | Colorado | Businessman; Philanthropist |
| Henry Ross Perot | 1930–2019 | 1985 | Texas | Businessman |
| Nicholas Petry | 1918–1999 | 2002 | Colorado | Cattleman; Philanthropist |
| James "Scotty" Philip | 1858–1911 | 1958 | South Dakota | Cattleman; Buffalo Preservationist |
| Frederic Augustus Phillips | 1869–1964 | 1967 | Oregon | Rancher; Cattleman; Farm Credit Leader |
| William Davis Poole | 1829–1911 | 1960 | Kansas | Cattleman |
| Henry Miller Porter | 1840–1937 | 1966 | Colorado | Telegraph Builder; Cattleman; Banker |
| Mel O. Potter | | 2021 | | |
| John Wesley Powell | 1834–1902 | 1984 | At Large | Geologist; Ethnologist |
| John Wesley Prowers | 1838–1884 | 1963 | Colorado | Freighter; Merchant; Cattleman |
| William MacLeod Raine | 1871–1954 | 1959 | At Large (Colorado) | Writer; Novelist |
| James Kenneth Ralston | 1896–1989 | 1978 | Montana | Cowboy; Pioneer; Artist |
| Ronald Wilson Reagan | 1911–2004 | 1989 | California | Actor; Governor; U.S. President |
| Bass Reeves | 1838–1910 | 1992 | Oklahoma | Peace Officer |
| Frederic Sackrider Remington | 1861–1909 | 1960 | At Large | Artist; Sculptor; Illustrator |
| George Thomas Reynolds | 1844–1925 | 1974 | Texas | Cowman; Banker; Rancher |
| Eugene Manlove Rhodes | 1869–1934 | 1958 | At Large (New Mexico) | Author and Writer |
| Wilse L. Richards | 1862–1953 | 1958 | North Dakota | Stockman |
| Bartlett Richards | 1862–1911 | 1970 | Nebraska | Cattleman; Rancher |
| Lynn Riggs | 1899–1954 | 1965 | Oklahoma | Playwright; Author |
| Will Rogers | 1879–1935 | 1955 | At Large | Cowboy; Humorist; Philosopher; Actor |
| Theodore Roosevelt | 1858–1919 | 1955 | At Large (North Dakota) | U.S. President; Cattleman; Conservationist |
| Cotton Rosser | 1928 | 2015 | California | Rodeo Producer |
| Frank Miles Rothrock | 1870–1957 | 1959 | Washington | Stockman |
| George C. Ruffner | 1862–1933 | 1958 | Arizona | Pioneer Lawman |
| Joseph Russ | 1825–1886 | 1965 | California | Stockman; Merchant |
| Charles Marion Russell | 1864–1926 | 1955 | At Large (Montana) | Artist |
| Hubbard Searles Russell | 1885–1963 | 1970 | California | Cattleman |
| Sacagawea | 1786–1884 | 1959 | At Large | Interpreter and Guide for Lewis and Clark Expedition |
| Mari Sandoz | 1896–1966 | 1998 | Nebraska | Author |
| Joseph Benjamin Saunders | 1901–1989 | 1979 | Texas | Oil Company Executive; Philanthropist |
| Charles A. Schreiner | 1838–1927 | 1964 | Texas | Cattleman |
| John Albert Scorup | 1872–1959 | 1960 | Utah | Cattleman; Church Leader |
| Sequoyah | 1770?–1843 | 1964 | Oklahoma | Cherokee Linguist |
| Henry Sieben | 1847–1937 | 1961 | Montana | Cattleman |
| J.R. Simplot | 1909–2008 | 1996 | Idaho | Industrial Magnate |
| Milward L. Simpson | 1898–1993 | 1985 | Wyoming | Governor; U.S. Senator |
| John Horton Slaughter | 1841–1922 | 1964 | Arizona | Cattleman; Trail-driver; Sheriff |
| Pierre-Jean de Smet | 1801–1873 | 1968 | At Large (Nebraska) | Jesuit Missionary |
| Hiram Francis Smith | 1829–1893 | 1960 | Washington | Cattleman; Developer |
| Jedediah Strong Smith | 1799–1831 | 1964 | At Large | Explorer; Trader |
| Benjamin Elam Snipes | 1835–1906 | 1958 | Washington | Cattleman; Pioneer |
| John Sparks | 1843–1908 | 1958 | Nevada | Rancher; Politician; Governor |
| Willis M. Spear | 1862–1936 | 1970 | Wyoming | Cattleman |
| Andrew Jackson Splawn | 1845–1917 | 1958 | Washington | Cattleman; Civic Leader |
| Charles Springer | 1858–1933 | 1961 | New Mexico | Cattleman; Political Leader |
| Red Steagall | 1937 | 2003 | Texas | Cowboy Poet; Radio Host |
| Isaac Ingalls Stevens | 1818–1862 | 1962 | Washington | Military Leader; Territorial Governor |
| William Morris Stewart | 1827–1909 | 1964 | Nevada | Lawyer; Nevada Politician |
| Victor Hugo Stickney | 1855–1921 | 1966 | North Dakota | Physician |
| Nelson Story, Sr. | 1838–1926 | 1959 | Montana | Cattleman; Merchant |
| Winfield Scott Stratton | 1848–1902 | 1967 | Colorado | Miner; Community Builder |
| Levi Strauss | 1829–1902 | 1994 | California | Businessman |
| Granville Stuart | 1834–1918 | 1966 | Montana | Pioneer; Frontiersman |
| John Survant | 1864–1951 | 1962 | Montana | Cattleman; Merchant |
| Alexander Hamilton Swan | 1831–1905 | 1960 | At Large | Cattleman; Founder Omaha Union Stockyards Company |
| Svante Magnus Swenson | 1816–1896 | 1972 | Texas | Cattleman; Rancher |
| Anne Burnett Tandy | 1900–1980 | 1994 | Texas | Rancher; Philanthropist |
| Jay Littleton Taylor | 1902–1982 | 1982 | Texas | Cattle; Oil; Banking |
| William Wiseham Terrett | 1847–1922 | 1967 | Montana | Rancher; Cattleman |
| Mahlon Daniel Thatcher | 1839–1916 | 1963 | Colorado | Banker |
| William Matthew Tilghman | 1854–1924 | 1960 | Oklahoma | Lawman; Marshall |
| Gerald Timmerman | 1940 | 2022 | Nebraska | Rancher; Businessman |
| Charles Harland Tompkins | 1873–1957 | 1958 | Oklahoma | Cattleman; Rodeo Champion; Civic Leader |
| Frederick Jackson Turner | 1861–1932 | 2009 | Wisconsin | Educator; Historian |
| Walter Vail | 1852-1906 | 2018 | Arizona | Rancher; Businessman; Politician |
| Andrew Voigt | 1867–1939 | 1962 | North Dakota | Cattleman; Rancher |
| Daniel Waggoner | 1828–1902 | 1959 | Texas | Pioneer Cattleman; Developer |
| Benjamin Franklin Wallace | 1860–1946 | 1963 | Arizona | Cattleman |
| Daniel "80 John" Webster | 1860-1939 | 2023 | Texas | Rancher |
| Francis Emroy Warren | 1844–1929 | 1958 | Wyoming | Stockman; Governor; U.S. Senator |
| Conrad Kohrs Warren | 1907–1993 | 1989 | Montana | Rancher; Agriculturalist |
| Chief Washakie | 1798/1804–1900 | 1979 | Wyoming | Tribal Leader; Artist |
| Walter Prescott Webb | 1888–1963 | 2012 | Texas | Historian; Author |
| Daniel Clay Wheeler | 1840–1915 | 1958 | Nevada | Rancher; Civic Worker; Humanitarian |
| Elias W. Whitcomb | 1838–1915 | 1971 | Wyoming | Cattleman |
| Olaf Wieghorst | 1899–1988 | 1992 | Arizona | Artist |
| Owen Wister | 1860–1938 | 1976 | At Large | Novelist; Author |
| Samuel Austin Worcester | 1798–1859 | 1963 | Oklahoma | Missionary |
| York | c. 1770 – c. 1832 | 2001 | Kentucky | African American Explorer – Lewis and Clark Expedition |
| Brigham Young | 1801–1877 | 1958 | At Large (Utah) | Colonizer; Church Leader – 1847 Mormon Pioneer Expedition |
| Buster Welch | 1928–2022 | 2024 | Texas | Horse trainer |
| Jack LeForce | | 2024 | Oklahoma | Agriculture |
| Louise O’Conner | | 2025 | Texas | Rancher, Author |
| Baxter Black | 1945–2022 | 2025 | Colorado | Poetry |
| Luster Bayless | 1937–2022 | 2026 | Mississippi | Costume design |
| Arthur Nicholas | born 1946 | 2026 | Wyoming | Museum curation |

== See also ==
- Category:People of the American Old West
- Hall of Great Western Performers
- Rodeo Hall of Fame
