= Ramon Ahumada =

Mexican-American rancher

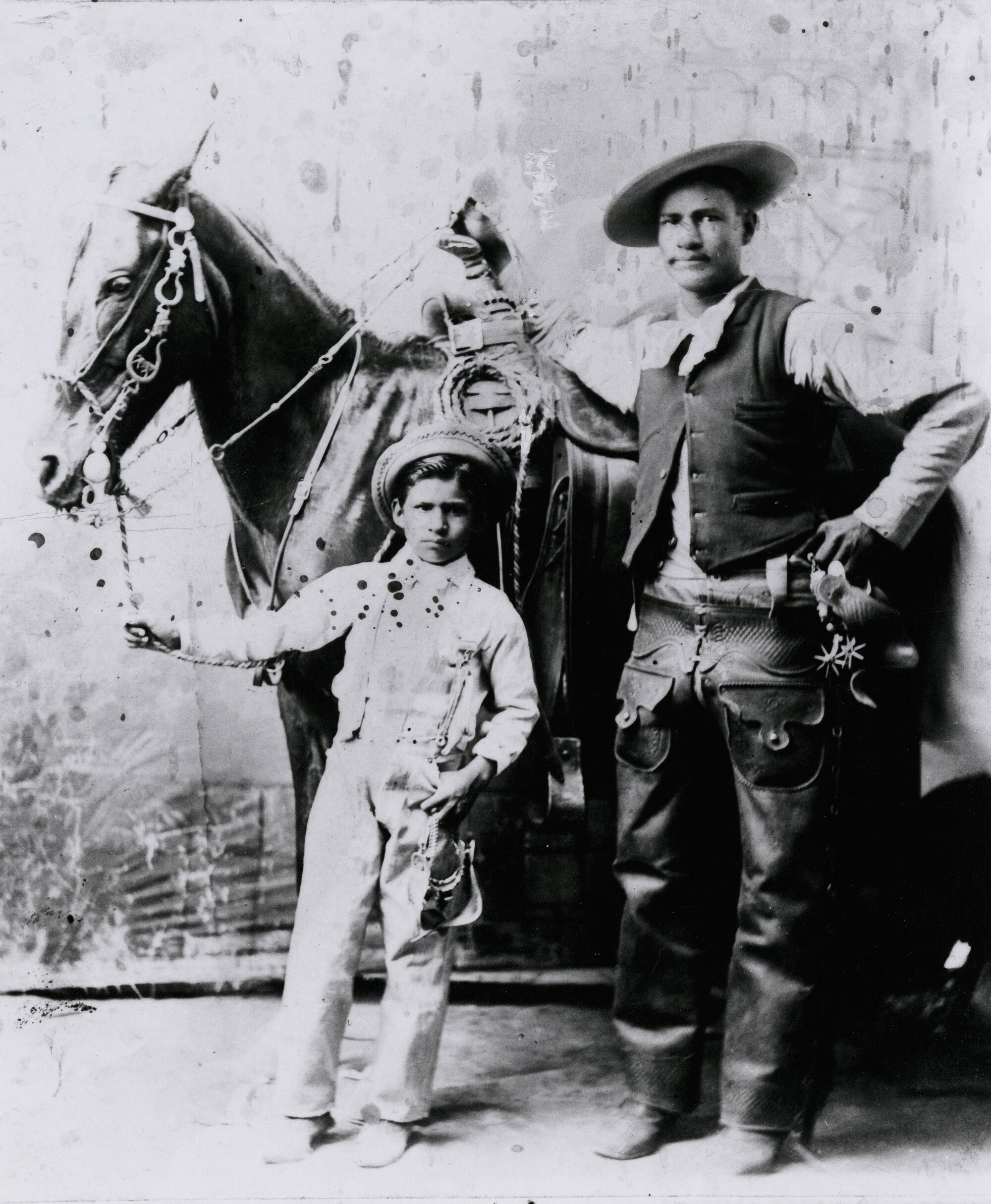
Luis Romero (left) and Ramon Ahumada (right)

Ramon Ahumada (Note: He is generally called Ramón in Spanish language sources and Ramon in English language ones.) (31 August 1868 – 14 January 1926) was a Mexican-American vaquero active in the Arivaca valley in Arizona. Ahumada was noted for his skill in organizing roundups of 5,000 cattle with teams of 70 to 80 men, as well as his generosity and character. Ahumada was inducted into the Hall of Great Westerners in 1958.

== Early life ==
According to writer and photographer Dane Coolidge, Ramon Ahumada was said to have been of Yaqui ancestry. Ahumada was born in the town of Batuc, near Altar, Sonora, on 31 August 1868. Batuc was one of three Sonoran pueblos destroyed by flooding after the construction of a dam.

== Life as a cowboy ==
At the age of 10 he moved to the Arizona Territory and began to train with his uncle on being a cowboy. After some time of working on his own, Ahumada gained the reputation of a good leader for roundups on the unfenced range and was frequently placed in charge of community roundups, during which time he used his encyclopedic knowledge of cattle brandings. In 1922, Ramon Ahumada was working as a cattle agent working on behalf of the Mexican government.

Ahumada was noted for his generosity, and for being a good host, according to Dane Coolidge. He had a large house and managed horses as well as cattle on his Arivaca-based ranch. He kept 200 mares and rode for himself a horse called Moro, who was descended from Steel Dust. He was married to Virginia Zepeda of the Moraga family and had no children.

On 9 January 1926, Ahumada was reported sick of typhoid fever and he died on 14 January 1926, though his death may have been related to a fall from a horse weeks prior.

Luis Romero, a cowboy who worked for Ahumada, noted his difficult working conditions and injuries while working for Ahumada, whom he called a "legend."
