= Montford Johnson =

American cattleman

Montford T. Johnson (November 1843 – February 17, 1896) (Chickasaw) was born and raised in Indian Territory (now the state of Oklahoma). Johnson is known for becoming a successful entrepreneur after the Civil War. He developed a large ranching operation that spanned a large area of central Indian Territory along the Chisholm Trail, including parts of what would eventually develop as Oklahoma City.

== Family background ==
Montford Johnson's father, Charles "Boggy" Johnson, was an English Shakespearean actor. Charles Johnson came to the United States with his brother when he was 19 years old and toured in the South with a theater production.

Charles Johnson married Chickasaw citizen Rebekah Courtney. Courtney was half Chickasaw (her mother's line) and half Scottish. Because the Chickasaw had a matrilineal kinship system, the mother's line determined her children's social status. After marriage, Rebekah was still considered Chickasaw. She and Charles migrated from the Southeast with most of the Chickasaw to Indian Territory during the early 19th century period of Indian Removal.

Charles received his nickname, "Boggy," while on the Removal trail. After crossing the Mississippi River, the Chickasaw became mired in the marshes and swamps of Arkansas. Charles, using a technique learned while growing up in England, organized men into groups to cut down saplings and lay them along the route, thereby allowing the livestock and wagons to pass through the quagmires. By assisting them with getting through this boggy country, the Chickasaw gave Charles Johnson the name "Boggy".

Once in Indian Territory, the Chickasaw created new villages. Boggy and Rebekah built their home north of Tishomingo. Present-day Connerville, Oklahoma was later developed near there.

== Early life ==
Montford was born in November 1843, about two years after his older sister, Adelaide. A few months after he was born, his mother became ill with pneumonia and died. Boggy, distraught by his wife's passing, decided to take the children and return east. The Chickasaw had matrilineal traditions and were also used to taking in motherless children and raise them as their own. Boggy's Chickasaw in-laws insisted on raising the Johnson children. Boggy left Adelaide and Montford, leaving them in the care of their grandmother, Sallie Tarntubby.

Montford grew up with his grandmother's family, learning Chickasaw traditions and how to care for livestock. Montford and Adelaide both attended school, Adelaide at Bloomfield Academy and Montford at Chickasaw Manual Labor Academy. There, Montford learned farming techniques intended to produce successful crops.

Montford and Adelaide lived under their grandmother Sallie's care until her death in 1858. At the end of that school year, they moved to the home of their next nearest relative, Sallie's half-brother, U.S. Army Captain Townsend Hothliche. He was stationed at Fort Arbuckle (near present-day Davis, Oklahoma), and had a house nearby on the South Bank of the Washita River.

On a trip to Fort Arbuckle, Adelaide befriended the Campbell family, who were living at the fort. The Campbells had moved there when the father, a U.S. Army Sergeant, was transferred to Fort Arbuckle. Adelaide fell in love with and married Micheal Campbell, one of Sergeant Campbell's sons.

== Civil War years ==
The outbreak of the Civil War forced major changes in Indian Territory and affected Montford and his family. Despite being forced out of the Southeast by whites encroaching on their lands, the Chickasaw and some of the other nations in Indian Territory allied with the Confederates.

The Union Army evacuated Indian Territory to Kansas, allowing Confederate troops from Texas to occupy many of the federal forts in Indian Territory.The Chickasaw nation sided with the Confederates, who had promised an Indian state if they won the war. The Chickasaw raised their own troops to maintain order and defense in the Territory.

Michael Campbell joined the Confederate cause and Chickasaw battalion as a Major; he was away from home during much of the war, although sometimes garrisoned at Fort Arbuckle.

Montford oversaw the duties of the homestead and worked as a partner with Michael. During this time period, Montford met and fell in love with Mary Campbell, Adelaide's sister-in-law. In the fall of 1862, they were married. A year later, their first child Edward Bryant Johnson (E.B.) was born.

In 1864, Michael Campbell was stationed at Fort Arbuckle and regularly made the trip home in the evening to spend the night. The trip required several crossings of the Washita River, which was a dangerous endeavor. One evening, on the way home, Michael was swept away in the current and drowned, leaving Adelaide as a young widow. She was pregnant with their second child and they already had a small son.

At 22 years old, Montford became the head of the homestead, including his sister's young family. In July 1865, the Chickasaw were officially the last Confederate tribe to surrender, marking the end of the United States' war. The Chickasaw Nation was devastated physically and financially. Schools had been converted to barracks or hospitals and would not be returned to teaching until the 1870s. Confederate debts incurred by ranchers and merchants during the war were worthless, leaving the Chickasaw largely impoverished.

== Ranching ==
Montford set to work to get the young ranch business in order. First, he purchased branding rights from his relatives. Second, he made an agreement with the men of neighboring farms to round up maverick cattle that had been set loose in the mountains during the war to escape the armies. Both armies were living off the land and taking livestock and produce from locals to feed their soldiers.

Wanting to build his herd, Montford offered to pay other farmers for each of the branded cattle he captured in the mountains. He would take as his own any unbranded cattle he collected.

While rounding up cattle, Montford noticed the wild cattle were attracted to salt. Using salt licks, he devised pen-traps that allowed cattle to enter but did not allow them to escape. This greatly increased the number of cattle Montford was able to corral with relatively little effort.

Around this time, Montford hosted his friend Jesse Chisholm on a buffalo hunt on the western range of Chickasaw territory, south of present-day Norman, Oklahoma. At that time, the area was largely undeveloped, and Montford thought it would be perfect to range cattle there. Jesse Chisholm suggested that Montford negotiate agreements with the tribes indigenous to the area. With Chisholm's help, Montford was able to make a deal with the tribes; they allowed him to use the land as long as he did not hire white men as ranch hands.

Montford began his first ranch in the spring of 1868, taking a team of men to [Walnut Creek], the same location of the buffalo hunt. Montford placed ranch hand Jack Brown in charge of the Walnut Creek Ranch. As payment for his services, Brown was to receive every fourth calf born on the ranch, making him possibly the first sharecropper of Oklahoma.

By fall 1869, Montford moved his family to a new homestead at the site of Camp Arbuckle. Montford began farming a 50-acre plot in 1870. He used the practice of burning fields to rid the land of old growth, as well as to prevent diseases and ticks. Montford used the burn technique his entire life.

== Establishing additional ranches ==
Around 1870, cattlemen from Texas stopped using the Shawnee Trail and began driving their herds to Kansas on the Western Shawnee Trail, which would become known as the Chisholm Trail.

In 1870, Montford's sister, the widowed Adelaide, married her second husband, Jim Bond, a trader and stockman. Montford settled his business with her (which was started while he oversaw her homestead during the war), giving her 15 cows and calves and several steers, worth approximately $1,100 at that time.

Montford was pressed by distant relative Chub Moore to take in several orphans. He agreed, taking in seven children, two of whom were almost adults. To lessen the burden of adopting so many children, Adelaide agreed to take two of them, and Granny Vicey Harmon (a family friend and Chickasaw) agreed to take three of the children. Montford and Mary took in the last two and Chub Moore.

Granny Vicey Harmon had lived with her Cherokee husband, Sampson Harmon, about 10 miles west of the Camp Arbuckle ranch until his death. After that she asked Montford to assist her in taking over Jesse Chisholm's trade post at Council Grove (in present-day Oklahoma City). Montford declined to help her with the trading post, but eventually convinced her to take charge of a new ranch at Council Grove, making her and her family the first permanent residents of the Oklahoma City metro area. In the spring of 1874, Charley Campbell, a brother of Adelaide's late husband, became a partner of Montford. He took over running the Walnut Creek Ranch.

== Boggy Johnson returns ==
In the summer of 1877, Montford received a letter from his estranged father, Boggy Johnson. They arranged to meet at a hotel in Denison, Texas. The men spent two days catching up and telling their respective stories. Montford found it odd that Boggy had not been able to contact them up to that point. The visit did offer an important opportunity for Montford. There were a number of Native Americans captured in the Red River War that had been taken from Fort Sill to Fort Marion in St. Augustine, Florida. The conditions of the 300-year-old fort were poor. Boggy claimed to have many friends in Washington D.C., and Montford thought a trip to St. Augustine might prompt Boggy to ask those friends to help improve conditions for the prisoners. Boggy contacted Montford the following summer, and they planned to meet in Jacksonville, Florida. Montford was accompanied by Charley Campbell and his son, E.B. They rode to Atoka, Oklahoma, and boarded the train. For E.B., it was his first train ride, and he was anxious on the first leg of the journey, convinced that they would crash. When they arrived in Jacksonville, E.B. met his grandfather for the first time. The following morning, they went by boat to St. Augustine and to the fort. There, they found the condition of the Native Americans to be poor. Montford received permission from Capt. Pratt to host a barbecue for the prisoners, and sent E.B. to find a cow for the feast. After finding a cow, E.B. had a butcher prepare and bring the beef to the fort. The prisoners were especially grateful to E.B. for bringing the beef. There was nothing more Montford could do in Florida, but after the trip, Boggy went back to Washington D.C. to work with his contacts.

== Ranching continues ==
Montford returned to his ranches and his son, E.B., returned to school in Tishomingo. Montford's Camp Arbuckle homestead was in the vicinity of the growing town of Johnsonville, and Montford became uncomfortable with the more crowded conditions of the area (all lands in Chickasaw territory were held in common, so there were no defined properties). In 1878, Montford worked out a trade with his friend, Caddo Bill Williams, exchanging eight geldings and an old stallion for Williams' ranch east of Snake Creek, near Old Silver City (just north of present-day Tuttle, Oklahoma). After Montford moved his family to Silver City in the fall of 1878, Adelaide and her husband, Jim Bond, moved nearby. They built their own home a couple miles west of the Chisholm Trail on the southern bank of the South Canadian River. Their homestead location was a suitable place for crossing the river, and cattle drivers often stopped at their home for the night. A major problem for Montford during the 1870s and 1880s was the threat posed by Texas cattle being driven north to the Kansas railroads. The Texas Longhorns brought ticks that carried [Texas cattle fever] to Montford's herds. While the Longhorns were immune, Montford's cattle were not, and he had difficulty keeping his herds separated from the Texas herds. In August, 1880, Montford's wife, Mary, became ill with a fever. The doctor at Ft. Reno, 25 miles away, was summoned. He reported that she was suffering from [ergotism]. Mary died on Aug. 27 and was buried in the family burial grounds at Silver City. Upon hearing of her death, Boggy Johnson asked to have E.B. join him in [New York City] to go to school. Montford agreed, and E.B. soon left to join his grandfather. Montford visited E.B. several times in New York City, and on a visit in late 1882, informed his son of his intent to marry his cousin-in-law, [Addie Campbell]. Addie was much younger than Montford, and E.B. objected to the marriage. Montford was unmoved, and E.B. eventually relented. By the 1880s, Montford was grazing his cattle on land between [Pottawatomie] country to the east, the [North Canadian River] to the north, the [Wichita Reservation] to the west and the Washita River to the south. Conflict quickly arose when settlers known as "[Boomers]" made attempts to enter the [Unassigned Lands] prior to the [Indian Appropriations Act of 1889]. They often burned ranch lands in an attempt to remove food for cattle. The ranchers, in turn, built fireguards using [controlled burns]. These fireguards were typically made perpendicular to creeks to reduce the effort required to make effective barriers. The barriers were made by plowing two parallel lines, then burning the grass between the lines, which created a barrier roughly 50 yards wide. Creating the fireguards was dangerous, as the fires could quickly turn against the ranchers if the wind shifted toward them.

== Business affairs taken over by Edward Bryant ==
E.B. returned from New York in February 1885 and immediately set to work getting Montford's businesses in order. Montford was a generous man, having allowed numerous lines of credit through his store in Silver City. Montford had also invested $25,000 in the New York City liquor business Boggy Johnson was involved in, which never produced a profit. Montford offered E.B. a 50 percent share of the Silver City store, and he set out to collect some of the overdue bills, which amounted to approximately $15,000. E.B. collected cash and livestock as payments for the various debts owed to the Silver City store E.B.'s actions made Montford's business partners uneasy, and they decided to end their partnerships. E.B. assisted closing out business with their partners, which included Jim Bond, Montford's brother-in-law. Montford and E.B. continued ranching despite continued encroachment by Boomers. New ranches were being established along Montford's periphery, creating sometimes dangerous situations. Occasionally, they would find cattle that had their brand covered up by a new brand, an obvious sign that cattle had been stolen. On one occasion, Montford and E.B. were fired upon after one of their men, [Adam Ward], was shot in a dispute over a steer. There were numerous similar incidents in which ranchers were killed in arguments over cattle ownership.

== Land rush of 1889 ==
In the spring of 1889, the Indian Appropriations Act of 1889 stated that 1.8 million acres of the Unassigned Lands were to be opened up to settlement for claimants, in what became known as the Land Rush of 1889. Some of Montford's holdings were in this region, but this occasion had been foreseen. In preparation for the land rush, the Army ordered all cattlemen to remove their livestock from Oklahoma Territory. E.B. gathered some men and began herding his cattle back into the Chickasaw Nation. During this cattle drive, the herd and several of E.B.'s men were captured by a group of soldiers and were to be taken to Fort Reno. E.B. caught up to the herd and forced the soldiers to retreat. After a while, a large group of cavalry placed the entire group under arrest. E.B. and his men were taken to the fort, where he discussed the issue with fort authorities. They decided the soldiers had acted on contradictory orders. E.B. was able to gather the herd and they departed, making it to Chickasaw Nation lands the morning of April 22, just hours before the rush was to begin

== Late life ==
With the land run, as well as the new barbed wire fencing-in of the prairie, Montford and the family had defined areas of land they controlled. Despite these major changes, they continued the business as usual. The dramatic increase in population also meant towns were growing. Montford, along with friends and family, soon became founders of several banks in Chickasha and Minco, Oklahoma Montford remained primarily interested in ranching and continued to seek new lands to graze his livestock. He established a lease agreement with the Kiowa, Comanche and Wichita tribes. The lease proved to be a difficult agreement. Inconsistent positions of the federal government concerning leasing of Indian lands as well as cattle rustling made the lease a failed venture. After two years of trying to succeed on the lands amid legal battles and significant livestock losses, Montford consolidated his herd back to his ranches that were clearly inside the Chickasaw Nation. Montford attempted to recover his losses from the federal government, but never received compensation In November 1893, the Dawes Commission was formally established, with the intent of allotting the Chickasaw Nation lands into holdings owned by individual Chickasaws. Montford considered the commission to be a treachery, especially after their apparent stonewalling over his losses in the leased district. Most distressing was that the commission's proposals forbade Chickasaws from purchasing more land than was allotted, though white settlers were not restricted from purchasing as much land as they pleased. Despite much protest from the Chickasaw and Choctaw Nations, the Commission persisted.

== Legacy ==
In April 2020, Montford was inducted into the Hall of Great Westerners of the National Cowboy & Western Heritage Museum.

== Death ==
Montford suffered from poor health for many years, including malaria. He made several trips to Eureka Springs, Arkansas, and took various medicines to try to alleviate some of his ailments. In the winter of 1895–1896, Montford suffered from numerous ailments at once, and after being bed-ridden for several months, died on Monday, February 17, 1896.

The following day, every business in Minco closed to show their respects. The headline of the February 21 issue of the Minco newspaper read "A Good Citizen Gone." Montford was 52 years old.

He was buried in the Silver City cemetery with his first wife, Mary. E.B. took over his father's affairs and looked after his numerous younger siblings, most of whom were still children. Addie, Montford's widow, died in 1905. E.B. arranged for her to be buried next to Montford.
