= Jake McClure =

American rodeo performer

Roy Leonard "Jake" McClure (1900 or 1903 – July 19, 1940) was an American rodeo cowboy and rancher known for his tightly looped lassos thrown quickly, with which he became known as the best calf roper in the world during his time competing in rodeos in the 1930s. McClure won the 1930 Rodeo Cowboys Association (RCA) calf-roping world championship title.

== Biography ==
Jake McClure was born in 1900 or 1903 in Amarillo, Texas and moved to Lovington, New Mexico when he was young. By the age of two, he used a clothesline like a lasso, and by five, roped animals and people with it. He left home as a teenager and worked in commercial ranching. He competed in his first rodeo in Roswell, New Mexico in 1925. After competing more at the Calgary Stampede, he won the overall championship at Pendleton Round-Up.

In 1931, McClure got first prize in calf roping a rodeo at the Madison Square Garden rodeo. He became the all-around champion in a Phoenix rodeo in 1937, won in Houston in 1939, and won again at Madison Square Garden that same year. McClure twice won first place in calf roping for RCA. In 1935, he averaged 20.3 seconds, and in 1936 he averaged 16.2 seconds.

Jake McClure was well known for his taciturn personality. McClure once went before a crowd to give a speech after winning a competition and some money, shuffled around without saying anything, and finally said "I guess you know I didn't win this money making speeches."

McClure married Dallas socialite Katheryn Matthews in 1933. In 1940, McClure did not compete in any rodeos because of injuries. His appendix had ruptured in 1939 and he narrowly survived. Not long before McClure's death, both his favorite horses Legs and Silver died, the former dropping dead while grazing and the latter being struck by a car. In July, McClure, while roping cattle at his 20,000 acre Lovington ranch, was thrown off his horse by a steer and landed head first. He was unconscious for a week in Lovington Hospital before succumbing to his injuries.

== Legacy ==
McClure was one of the first five inductees of the National Cowboy & Western Heritage Museum's Hall of Great Westerners. Fellow inductee and friend Will Rogers, who once hosted Cheyenne Frontier Days when McClure was competing, was also part of the inaugural set. He is also part of the PRCA's ProRodeo Hall of Fame and was inducted in 2002.

Lea County Fair and Rodeo is held annually in the Jake McClure Arena.
