= Laton Alton Huffman =

American photographer

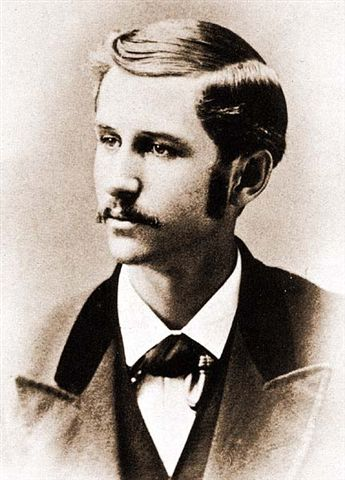
Huffman ca. 1880.

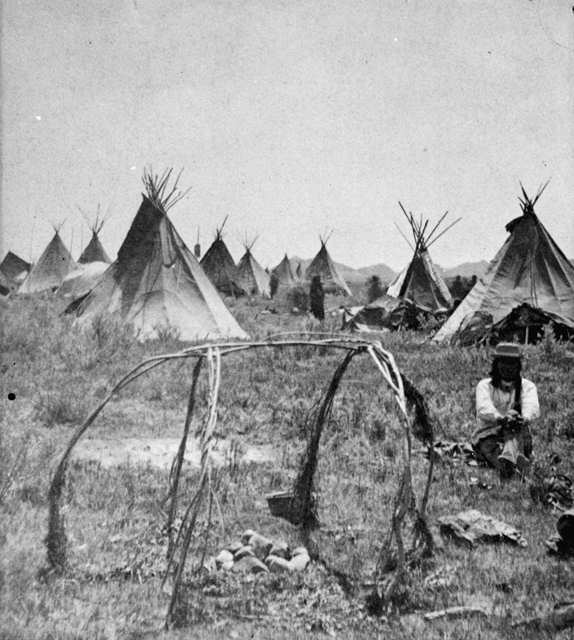
Sweat lodge, Sioux Village by Huffman, taken between 1896 and 1905. This photograph is one half of a stereograph.

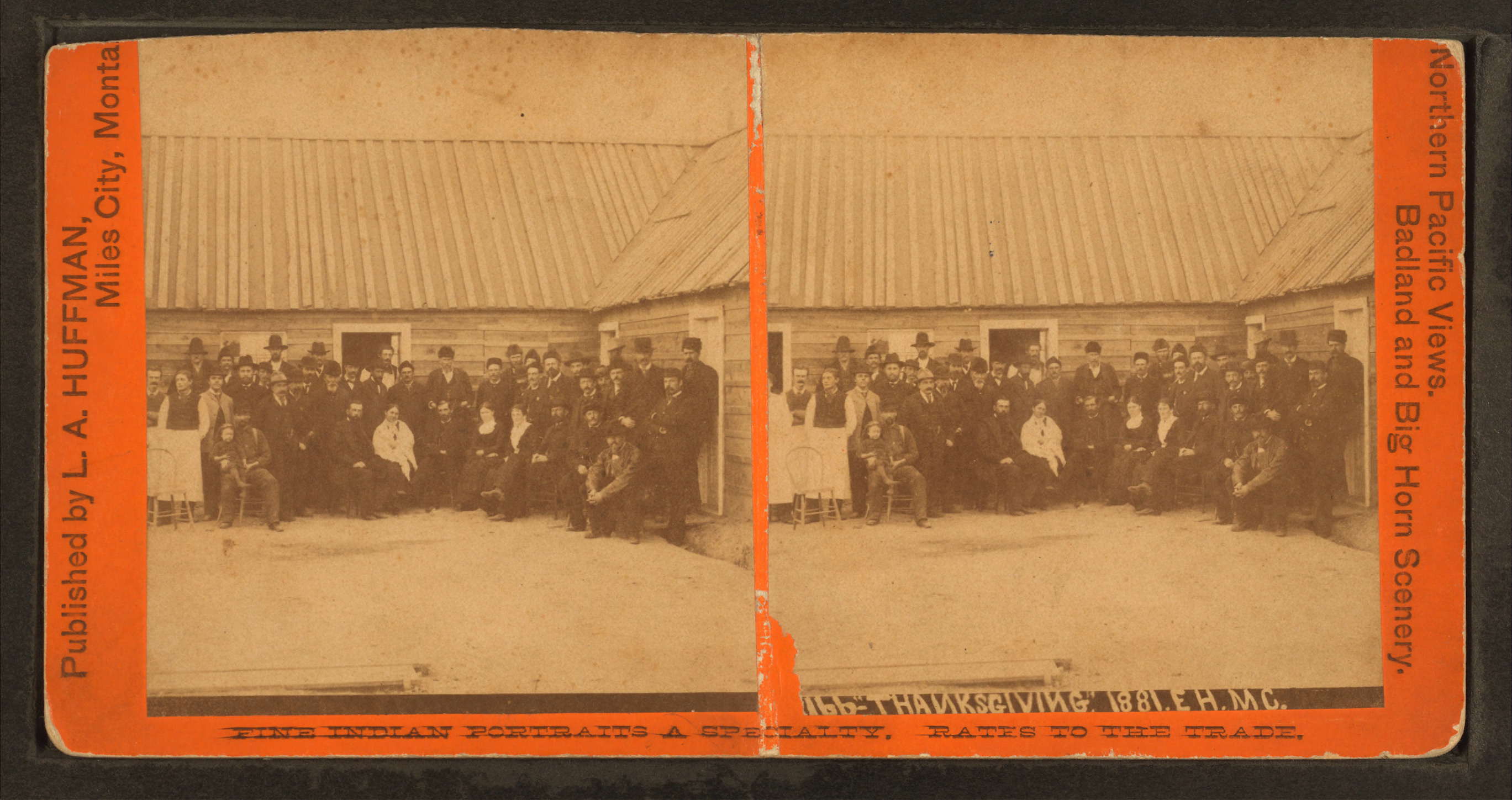
Thanksgiving 1881 E.H.M.C. stereograph by Huffman, taken between 1870 and 1920

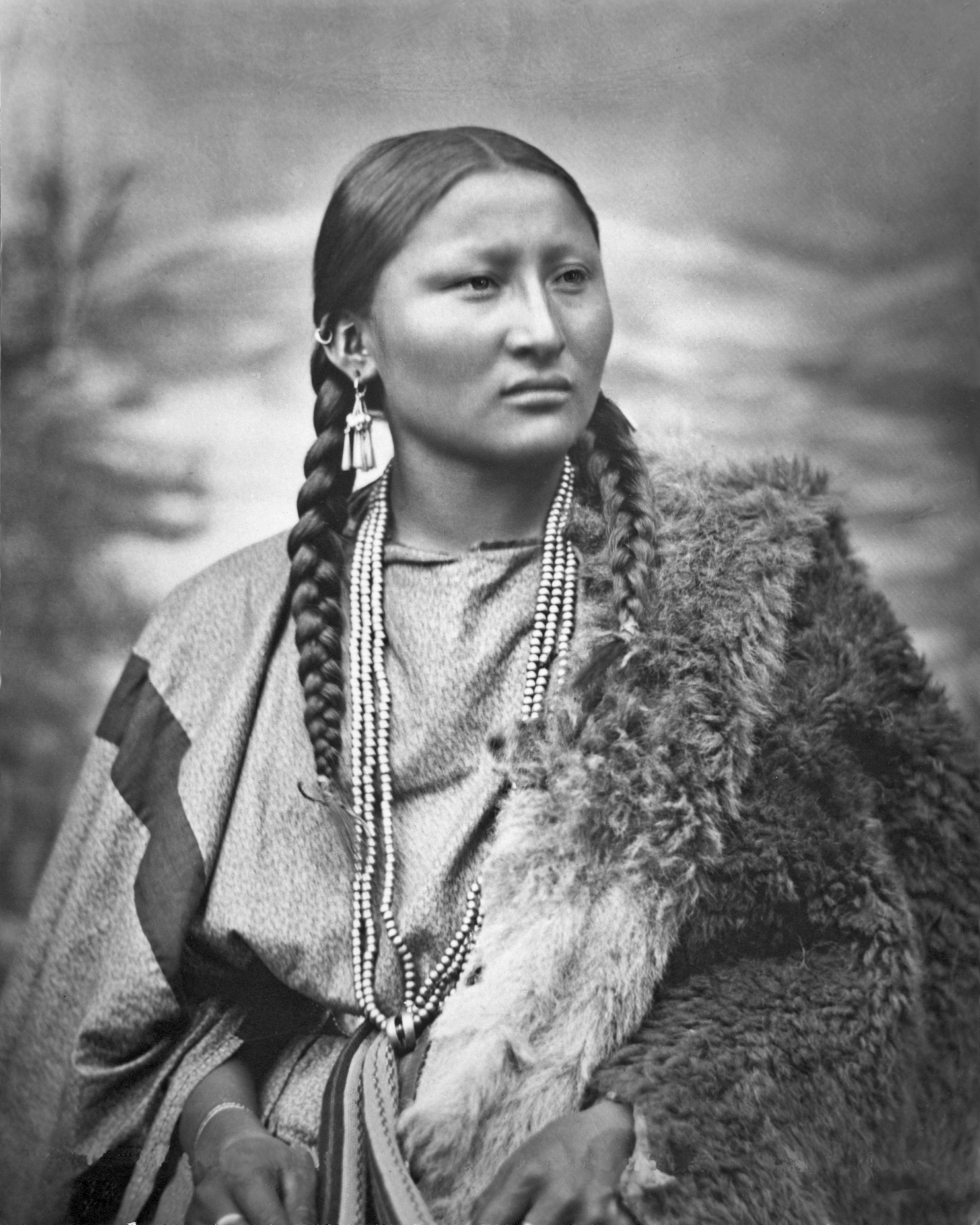
The war chief Pretty Nose, 1879, collotype (restored)

Laton Alton Huffman (October 31, 1854 – December 28, 1931) was an American photographer of Frontier and Native American life. He spent most of his life photographing the area around his Montana home. His action shots were considered revolutionary for the time. He captured the first known photograph of a bucking horse with a cowboy in midair.

Huffman was born in Winneshiek County, Iowa. He initially learned photography from his father. In 1878 he worked briefly with Frank Jay Haynes where he expanded his photography knowledge and learned about the business. By December 1879 he became post photographer at Fort Keogh in the Montana Territory.

He started to sell prints of his glass plate negatives and opened several successive studios in nearby Miles City. He earned a reputation as a respected regional photographer during this time. His work was nationally featured in magazines and used in postcards and collotypes.

Huffman maintained his photography business until his death in 1931.

In 1976, Huffman was inducted into the Hall of Great Westerners of the National Cowboy & Western Heritage Museum.

== Publications with contributions by Huffman ==
- The Frontier Years: L.A. Huffman, Photographer of the Plains. New York: Henry Holt, 1955. OCLC 961787
- Before Barbed Wire.
- L.A. Huffman: Photographer of the American West. By Larry Len Peterson and with photographs by Huffman.
  - Missoula, MT: Mountain Press, 2005.
  - Missoula, MT: Mountain Press, 2013. ISBN 978-0878425143. Revised third edition.
- The Collotypes of L.A. Huffman: Montana Frontier Photographer. Helena, MT: Riverbend, 2014. ISBN 978-1-60639-072-6. By Gene and Bev Allen and with photographs by Huffman.

== Collections ==
Huffman's work is held in the following public collections:

- Montana Historical Society, Helena, Montana
- J. Paul Getty Museum, Los Angeles, California.
- San Francisco Museum of Modern Art, San Francisco, California: 1 print (as of November 2018)
- Art Institute of Chicago, Chicago, Illinois: 22 prints (acquired 1975)
