= Ben C. Ash =

American law enforcement officer and pioneer

Benjamin Cowden Ash (19 December 1851 – 16 April 1946) was an American law enforcement officer and pioneer in the Dakota Territory. He created the Bismarck-Deadwood trail, used widely by travelers during the Black Hills gold rush. As a Deputy U.S. Marshal, he developed a reputation for never using handcuffs or a drawn weapon during arrests, doing the former only once.

== Early life ==
Ash was born on 19 December 1851 on a farm in White County, Indiana. His family moved to Sioux City, Iowa in 1859 and then Yankton, South Dakota in 1859, where they were among the first settlers. His father, Henry C. Ash, operated the town's hotel. At the age of 12, he was printer's devil to what is now the Press & Dakotan newspaper. While still young, he traded and broke horses. He worked around the local Indians, learning their language and ways. He was made a Deputy Marshal under Laban H. Litchfield at the age of 17.

== Career ==
In 1872, the railroad contractors Burleigh & Keith put him in charge of a group of men who erected buildings at what would become Bismarck. Ash managed the commissary until the railroad was built. In 1873, he accompanied George Armstrong Custer on his Yellowstone Expedition, becoming leader of the supply train. Afterwards, at Custer's request, Ash went undercover in Bismarck to catch a thief who stole supplies from Custer's camp and resold them. Ash acted as a livery stableman and successfully caught the perpetrators.

After Custer found gold during his Black Hills Expedition, Bismarck businessmen secretly, and illegally, sent two men to the area to verify the rumor and create a trail. With those men having not returned, the businessmen convened again looking again for someone to venture into the Black Hills. Ash and another man, S.C. Dodge, volunteered. Having set out towards the Black Hills, camping one night by the frozen over Missouri River, they two were unexpectedly greeted by three men riding across the river. The two expected them to be forces under Custer, but they were really adventurers who joined the journey. On Christmas Day 1875, the party saw Bear Butte and Harney Peak from 100 miles away. Upon ascending the mountains, they found miners already present at Spring Creek at modern day Hill City and the remnants of the still-inhabited Gordon Stockade. They met California Joe Milner and he showed them the site that would become Rapid City, which Ash and Dodge agreed to return to for ranching. The party returned on 20 January. Ash wrote positively about the landscape to his parents, who moved to the area. Ash was forced to abandon his attempt to ranch at the spot with Dodge after he was apparently killed by Indians.

He played a minor role in the prosecution of Jack McCall, subpoenaing witnesses of the poker game anteceding his murder of Wild Bill Hickok.

=== Later endeavors ===
Ash settled down in the city of Pierre. He was twice elected sheriff of Hughes County as a Democrat, despite the area's local Republican dominance. Afterwards, he worked as an Indian agent for the Lower Brule during the administration of Grover Cleveland. Ash helped establish a bank in Faith, South Dakota.

While still an agent, he moved near Ada, Perkins County and kept 1,000 horses. In 1905 he had around 5,000 steers. After a trip to Mexico, in 1910, with the help of Porfirio Díaz, Ash began to enact a plan to breed cattle in Mexico and raise them in South Dakota, but he abandoned this immediately when the Mexican Revolution ousted Díaz. After Woodrow Wilson lowered the wool tariff, he bought sheep from his neighbors as their price cratered, then sold them when prices picked back up around World War I. After the death of a son, he and his wife retired to Miami. Ash returned to South Dakota some time after the 1930 death of his wife.

== Personal life and death ==
Ash married Sarah Brisbine, a teacher and daughter of a Yankton judge, in 1876. He had three children. At some point, a bill was introduced in the South Dakota Legislature to give Ash a pension of 50 dollars a month, but he did not receive it as of 1935. He died on 15 April 1946 at the State Veterans Home in Hot Springs.

A granite monument off U.S. Route 212, erected July 1949, marks the spot where he saw the Black Hills for the first time. It was erected based on a comment he had made in 1945 about his intention to erect such a monument. He was inducted into the Hall of Great Westerners in 1959 and the South Dakota Hall of Fame in 1986.
