= Hiram F. Smith =

American politician

Member of the Washington Territorial Legislature
- In office 1865–1866

Member of the Washington House of Representatives from the 16th district
- In office 1891–1893

Personal details
- Born: c. 1829
- Died: September 9, 1893 (aged 63–64) Olympia, Washington

Hiram F. "Okanogan" Smith (c. 1829 – September 9, 1893) was one of the first American settlers in the Pacific Northwest. Smith was born in Maine and learned the printer's trade, working on papers in Detroit and with Horace Greeley in New York. He came to California during the 1849 Gold Rush, and remained there until the Terry-Broderick duel, an affair he lamented deeply as an intimate of both parties. He then went to The Dalles in Oregon, where he operated a pack train, and prospected gold in the Fraser River valley of British Columbia. Unsuccessful in that venture, he located a claim on the east bank of Osoyoos Lake, near today's Oroville, Washington, in 1859, where he opened a trading post.

The post became an oasis in a wilderness for traders and travelling miners, and earned Smith a reputation for hospitality. He introduced vegetable farming and fruit orcharding to the region, and is remembered is a pioneer of Washington's apple industry. His fair dealings with the Indians won him their respect, and he was often consulted as an arbiter. According to Tonasket, a chief of the Okanogans, Smith was a better friend to the Indians than the government:

The government was always promising what it would do and never doing it, and the [government] agent was always telling the Indians what they must do, and did not know how to do it himself; and that if Smith promised them a thing, they got it; and if he told them how to do something, he showed them how to do it; also that Smith never lied to them, and the government did.

He married a woman named Mary, the daughter of a Similkameen chief. In 1865, he began a series of terms in the territorial, and later the state legislatures.

He may have averted a massacre in 1891 when the frenzied citizenry at the camps of Ruby and Conconully feared an imminent Indian attack. Before the people could arm themselves, Smith counseled, "The Okanogan Indians are peaceful. They have taken little stock in the Messiah craze, nor is it likely that they will join with the Canadian Indians."

He died in Olympia, Washington at the age of 62 of a cold and dysentery.

In 1960, he was inducted into the Hall of Great Westerners of the National Cowboy & Western Heritage Museum.
