= Hildreth, California =

Unincorporated community in California, United States

Hildreth
- Unincorporated community
- Location in California Hildreth (the United States)
- Coordinates: 37°06′32″N 119°37′59″W
- Country: United States
- State: California
- County: Madera
- Elevation: 1,250 ft (380 m)

Hildreth is an unincorporated community in Madera County, California, United States. It is located 3.5 miles (5.6 km) east-southeast of O'Neals, at an elevation of 1247 feet (380 m).

In the late 1870s, Tom Hildreth opened a store at the site, thereby beginning the town named for him. A post office operated at Hildreth from 1886 to 1896. At its peak in the 1880s, Hildreth had a hotel, three general stores, a mine, a barbershop, and other businesses catering to miners and travelers on the stage road from Millerton. The town "officially died" in 1896 when the post office closed. Gold mining in the Hildreth district briefly revived in the late 1920s, but the town was never repopulated. By 2010, only the schoolhouse and cemetery remained.
