= Jeffers, Montana =

- Census-designated place
- Location within Montana Location within the United States
- Coordinates: 45°20′53″N 111°42′13″W
- Country: United States
- State: Montana
- County: Madison

Area
  - Total: 0.32 sq mi (0.82 km^{2})
  - Land: 0.32 sq mi (0.82 km^{2})
  - Water: 0 sq mi (0.00 km^{2})
- Elevation: 4,931 ft (1,503 m)

Population (2020)
  - Total: 25
  - Density: 78.8/sq mi (30.42/km^{2})
- Time zone: UTC-7 (Mountain (MST))
  - Summer (DST): UTC-6 (MDT)
- ZIP Code: 59729 (Ennis)
- Area code: 406
- FIPS code: 30-39325
- GNIS feature ID: 2806643

Jeffers is an unincorporated community and census-designated place (CDP) in Madison County, Montana, United States. It is in the eastern part of the county, on the east side of the valley of the Madison River. By road it is 2 miles (3 km) east of Ennis, which sits on the west side of the river.

Jeffers was first listed as a CDP prior to the 2020 census, when it had a population of 25.

== Demographics ==
Historical population
Census	Pop.	Note	%±
2020	25		—
U.S. Decennial Census

== Education ==
It is in Ennis K-12 Schools school district.
