= Ought To Go =

Quarter Horse racehorse and broodmare

- Breed: Quarter Horse
- Discipline: Racing
- Sire: Go Man Go
- Grandsire: Top Deck (TB)
- Dam: Do Good Bam
- Maternal grandsire: War Bam (TB)
- Sex: Mare
- Foaled: 1967
- Country: United States
- Color: Sorrel
- Breeder: Frank Vessels Jr.

Record
- 29 starts; 7-5-7; AAA speed rating

Earnings
- $11,852.00

Awards
- AQHA Superior Race Horse; AQHA Race Register of Merit

Honors
- American Quarter Horse Hall of Fame

While successful at the Quarter Horse racetrack, Ought To Go (born 1967) was far more successful in the breeding shed, producing twelve foals. Ten of those foals started and won races.

== Life ==
Ought To Go was a 1967 sorrel filly, sired by Go Man Go and out of Do Good Bam. Do Good Bam was a half sister of Chicado V, having the same dam, Do Good, but different sires. Do Good Bam's sire was a Thoroughbred stallion named War Bam, while Chicado V was sired by Chicaro Bill.

== Racing career ==
Ought To Go raced for three years, starting 29 times. From those starts, she won seven times, came in second five times, and was third seven times. She earned $11,852.00 and 58 American Quarter Horse Association (or AQHA) racing points. Her racing points earned her an AQHA Superior Race Horse award along with her Race Register of Merit. The highest speed rating she attained was AAA.

== Breeding record ==
Ought To Go produced twelve foals. Ten of her foals started and all of her starters won races, with the total earned by her offspring totally $492,019.00. Further descendants include Fishers Dash, Check Her Twice, Chick Him Out, First Femme, Old Habits, Class with Cash, Society Road, Solvency, See Me Gone, Miss Eye Opener, Somekindadash, and Daring Difference.

== Honors ==
Ought To Go was inducted into the AQHA Hall of Fame in 2003.

== Pedigree ==
Equipoise (TB)
Equestrian (TB)
Frilette (TB)
Top Deck (TB)
Chicaro (TB)
River Boat (TB)
Last Boat (TB)
Go Man Go
Wise Counsellor (TB)
Very Wise (TB)
Omona (TB)
Lightfoot Sis
The Dun Horse
Clear Track
Ella
Ought To Go
Man o'War (TB)
War Glory (TB)
Annette K (TB)
War Bam (TB)
North Star (TB)
Bamboula (TB)
Bit O Love (TB)
Do Good Bam
Eck Davis (TB)
St. Louis
Old Flossie
Do Good
Duggan
Flossie
Old Floridene
