= Miss Jim 45 =

Quarter Horse mare and show horse

- Breed: Quarter Horse
- Discipline: Halter
- Sire: Jim Harlan
- Grandsire: Harlan
- Dam: Miss Paulo 45
- Maternal grandsire: Paulos Dandy
- Sex: Mare
- Foaled: 1966
- Died: 1978 (aged 11–12)
- Country: United States
- Color: red dun
- Breeder: James Nance
- Owner: George Tyler, Frank Merrill

Other awards
- 1970 AQHA High Point Halter Horse

Honors
- American Quarter Horse Hall of Fame
- Last updated on: January 12, 2008.

Miss Jim 45 was a red dun Quarter Horse mare who won the 1970 American Quarter Horse Association, or AQHA, High Point Halter Horse Award.

She was a 1966 foal, and her sire was Jim Harlan and her dam was a Waggoner Ranch mare named Miss Paulo 45. Her sire traced back to King P-234 as well as Peter McCue, Traveler and Oklahoma Star P-6. Her dam traced to many of the same sires, including King P-234, Traveler, Peter McCue and Yellow Jacket.

== Show career ==
She earned 436 AQHA open halter points that year, in 153 shows, placing first 139 times, second 12 times and one third and one fifth place. She was Grand Champion Mare all but 16 of those shows. Frank Merrill, who showed her to the title that year, said when he bought her, he was told by Matlock Rose that "Son, anyone could lead this horse into the ring and do just as well as me." Besides her High Point award she also earned a Superior Halter Horse award with the AQHA.

== Death and honors ==
She died in 1978 and in 2000 she was inducted into the AQHA American Quarter Horse Hall of Fame.

== Pedigree ==
King P-234
Hank H
Queen H
Harlan
Beetch's Yellow Jacket
Dixie Beach
Mayflower
Jim Harlan
Little Fort
Cuter McCue
mare by Midnight
Nancy Squaw
Little King
Kings Squaw
Oklahoma Squaw
Miss Jim 45
Bolo
Paulo
Paulita
Paulos Dandy
Billy Waggoner
Duck Wing
Polly
Miss Paulo 45
King P-234
L H Chock
Miss Alice
Chock Lady 45
Blackburn
Lady Black 45
Waggoner mare
