= Al Dunning =

American horse trainer

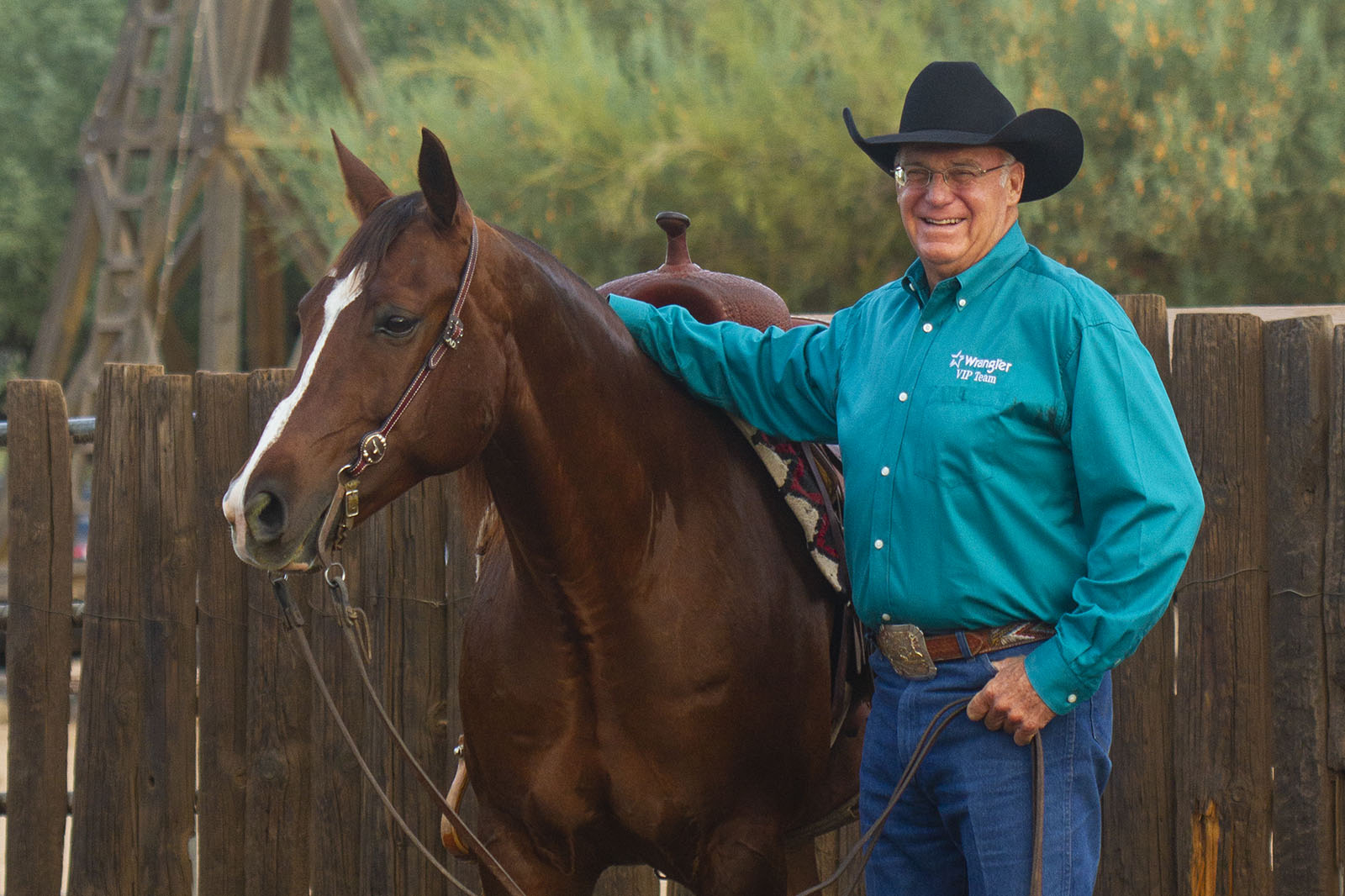
- Born: March 5, 1950 (age 76); Chicago, United States
- Education: Phoenix College; Arizona State University
- Occupations: horse trainer, cowboy, author
- Website: aldunning.com

Al Dunning (born March 5, 1950) is an American horse trainer specializing in western performance horses. He has trained multiple world champions in reining, cutting, working cow horse, halter, and all-around. His most famous horse was Expensive Hobby. He was inducted into the Arizona Quarter Horse Association Hall of Fame in 2016.

== Early life ==
Al Dunning grew up outside of Chicago, Illinois, then in 1958 moved with his family to Arizona and took lessons at Siminoff Stables where he learned horsemanship and roping.

From 1962 to 1968 Dunning showed at both American Quarter Horse Association and American Horse Show Association shows in reining, working cow horse, horsemanship, trail, western pleasure, hunt seat equitation, jumping, calf roping, and horse showmanship.

Dunning won his first major reining class at age 19 on Stormy Pink, a 1963 palomino mare by Sugar Bars.

Dunning graduated from Phoenix College and attended Arizona State University.

== Career ==
In 1970, Dunning started his own professional training business, focusing on halter, reining and youth all-around. Dunning's most famous horse was Expensive Hobby, a 1971 gelding.

During his career, "the horse won 29 of 32 hackamore classes and finished first in more than 100 reining or cow horse events. One of those finishes was an AQHA World Championship in working cow horse in 1976. He added AQHA World titles in senior reining and senior working cow horse in 1979. He also won the NRHA Open Championship at the 1980 All American Quarter Horse Congress and earned an AQHA Superior in cutting.”

In the early 1980s, Dunning worked with Hall of Fame trainer Don Dodge to learn about cutting horses. He has since shown multiple horses to AQHA and NCHA World Championships.

Dunning has mentored many assistant trainers who have gone on to be professional horsemen including Brad Barkemeyer, Patrick Flaherty, Chris Johnsrud, Casey Hinton, Pete Kyle, John Pipkin, Brett Stone, Mike Wood, Jade Keller and Cody Lamont.

Dunning and his clients have earned 48 World and Reserve World Championships in AQHA, NCHA, NRCHA, and NRHA. He serves on multiple committees for the AQHA and NCHA and holds an NRCHA judge's card. He has conducted clinics around the globe, including the Equine Affair, Midwest Horse Fair, the All American Quarter Horse Congress, EQUITANA Germany, and EQUITANA Australia.

Dunning lives in Scottsdale, Arizona, and operates a training facility called Almosta Ranch with his wife Becky Dunning.

== Awards ==
- 1996 Professional Horseman of the Year (American Quarter Horse Association)
- 2003 Trainer of the Year (National Cutting Horse Association, Zane Schulte Award)
- 2016 Arizona Quarter Horse Association Hall of Fame
- 2017 Western Horseman Award (Western Horseman Magazine)
- EquiStat Elite Million Dollar Rider

== Publications ==
- Dunning, Al; Close, Pat (1983). A Western Horseman Book: Reining. The Western Horseman, Inc. ISBN 978-0-911647-02-0.
- Dunning, Al; LeRoy, Tammy (2008). The Ultimate Level of Horsemanship: Training Through Inspiration. Lyons Press. ISBN 978-1-59921-334-7.
- Dunning, Al (2001). Reining: the Guide for Training & Showing Winning Reining Horses. Western Horseman Inc. ISBN 978-0-911647-39-6.
- Dunning, Al (2012). The Art of Hackamore Training: A Time-Honored Step in the Bridle-Horse Tradition. Western Horseman Magazine. ISBN 978-0-7627-8056-3.
- Dunning, Al (2015). Down the Fence: Training and Showing the Reined Cow Horse. Western Horseman Magazine. ISBN 978-1-4930-0174-3.
