= Chicks Beduino =

Quarter Horse racehorse and sire

- Breed: Quarter Horse
- Discipline: Racing
- Sire: imported Beduino (TB)
- Grandsire: imported Romany Royal (TB)
- Dam: A Classy Chick
- Maternal grandsire: Chicks Deck
- Sex: Stallion
- Foaled: 1984
- Country: United States
- Color: Gray
- Breeder: Joe Muniz and John Bobenrieth
- Owner: Muniz and Bobenrieth

Record
- 14 starts: 7-2-1; SI-104

Earnings
- $412,099.00

Major wins
- Bay Meadows Futurity (G1)

Honors
- American Quarter Horse Hall of Fame

Chicks Beduino (1984–2003) as of the end of 2006 was second on the all-time list of leading Quarter Horse sires by races won by his offspring, and third on the all-time list of racing money earned by his offspring. He has sired one World Champion Quarter Running Horse – Whosleavingwho, as well as other champion horses including Separatist, Chicks First Policy, Corona Chick, This Snow is Royal, Artesias Special Chic, The Prize, Country Chics Man and Evening Snow. He died in 2003 from kidney failure.

Chicks Beduino was inducted into the AQHA Hall of Fame in 2007.

== Pedigree ==
*Nasrullah (TB)
=Grey Sovereign (TB)
=Kong (TB)
*Romany Royal (TB)
=Vilmorin (TB)
=Romany Belle (TB)
=Romany Chi (TB)
*Beduino (TB)
Revoked (TB)
Rejected (TB)
By Line (TB)
Jo-Ann-Cat (TB)
Depth Charge (TB)
Quick Eye (TB)
Eye To Eye (TB)
Chicks Beduino
Three Bars (TB)
Three Chicks
Chicado V
Chicks Deck
Top Deck (TB)
Decketta
Lady Thomas Wilson
A Classy Chick
Corporal (TB)
Mayhego (TB)
Cathy (TB)
Mayshego (TB)
Greek Song (TB)
Aegean Goddess (TB)
Faithful More (TB)
