= Quo Vadis (horse) =

Quarter Horse show horse and broodmare

- Breed: Quarter Horse
- Discipline: Showing
- Sire: Little Lloyd
- Grandsire: Babe Grande
- Dam: Miss Circle H III
- Maternal grandsire: Brown Caesar
- Sex: Mare
- Foaled: 1952
- Country: United States
- Color: Black
- Breeder: Ross Roberts
- Owner: Marianne Randals

Other awards
- AQHA Performance Register of Merit; AQHA Champion

Honors
- American Quarter Horse Hall of Fame

Quo Vadis (born 1952) was an outstanding Quarter Horse show mare as well as being an outstanding broodmare in the early days of the American Quarter Horse Association (or AQHA).

== Life ==
Quo Vadis was foaled 1952 and bred by Ross Roberts of San Jon, New Mexico. She was a black mare, owned at the time of registration by Marianne Randals of Snyder, Texas. Both her sire and her dam's sire were products of the King Ranch linebreeding program, so Quo Vadis was descended from Old Sorrel twice. She also traced five times to Peter McCue as well as once to Traveler.

== Show career ==
In Quo Vadis' show career, she earned an AQHA Championship as well as a Performance Register of Merit. She earned a total of forty open halter points with the AQHA, and twenty-nine open performance points. She earned points in cutting, working cow horse, reining, and western riding. She also earned $208.40 in National Cutting Horse Association (or NCHA) cutting competition.

== Broodmare record ==
After Quo Vadis' show career, she retired to become a broodmare. She had twelve foals in total. Eleven of them earned AQHA points in halter. Four of them became AQHA Champions – Mr. Perfection, Poco Becky, Bonita Dondi, and Kaliman. Three foals earned a Superior Halter Horse award – Madonna Dell, Mr. Perfection, and Kaliman. She also foaled Majestic Dell, a stallion who earned forty-nine halter points, just one shy of his Superior Halter Horse.

== Honors ==
Quo Vadis was inducted into the AQHA Hall of Fame in 2002.

== Pedigree ==
Hickory Bill
Old Sorrel
Dr. Rose mare
Babe Grande
Hickory Bill
Roan Hickory Bill Mare
Mamie Jay
Little Lloyd
Little Joe
Pancho Villa
Jeanette
Estufa
unknown
Canales mare
unknown
Quo Vadis
Old Sorrel
Babe Grande
Roan Hickory Bill Mare
Brown Caesar
Little Hickory
Conley Roan Mare
mare by Garcia Roan
Miss Circle H III
Yellow Wolf
Kenney Stud
unknown
Bess
Windy City (TB)
June Bug mare
unknown
