= Grey Badger II =

Quarter Horse racehorse and sire

- Breed: Quarter Horse
- Discipline: Racing
- Sire: Midnight Jr
- Grandsire: Midnight
- Dam: Grey Annie
- Maternal grandsire: Billy The Tough
- Sex: Stallion
- Foaled: 1941
- Country: United States
- Color: Gray
- Breeder: Walter F. Merrick

Record
- 6 starts: 2-0-0

Awards
- AA speed rating

Honors
- American Quarter Horse Hall of Fame

Grey Badger II (1941–c. 1972) was a noted Quarter Horse match racer and sire in the early days of the American Quarter Horse Association or AQHA.

== Life ==
Grey Badger II foaled on May 5, 1941. He was registered with number 2006 in the AQHA. His stud book listing gives his color as gray, and his breeder as Walter F. Merrick of Texola, Oklahoma. His sire was Midnight Jr #210, and his dam was listed as Grey Annie #3502 by Billy the Tough, second dam as Casey Jones mare by Casey Jones. He was owned by Chick Crisp of Sayre, Oklahoma at the time he was registered. His sire was a son of Midnight and traced to Peter McCue three times. His dam traced to Peter McCue two more times, making Grey Badger II inbred to Peter McCue, with five crosses.

== Racing career ==
Grey Badger II was a noted match racer during the 1940s. His official racing record with the AQHA has him starting six times in three years, with two wins and no seconds or thirds. He achieved an AA speed rating.

== Breeding record ==
Among his famous offspring were Grey Badger III and Badger's Grey. His granddaughter Triangle Tookie is a leading producer of AQHA Champions, including Two Eyed Jack.

== Death and honors ==
Grey Badger II died on the Triangle Ranch in Texas, probably around 1972.

Grey Badger II was inducted into the AQHA Hall of Fame in 2007.

== Pedigree ==
Peter McCue
Badger
Mazie Marie
Midnight
Ace by Peter McCue
Nellie Trammell
mare by Pid Hart
Midnight Jr
A D Reed
Billy The Tough
Betsy
Salty
Joy
Peachie
Perfect Doll
Grey Badger II
Peter McCue
A D Reed
Good Enough
Billy The Tough
Kid Weller
Betsy
Trammell mare
Grey Annie
Peter McCue
Casey Jones
Sweetwater Lady
mare by Casey Jones
unknown
