= Barbara L =

Quarter Horse race mare

- Barbara L
- Breed: Quarter Horse
- Discipline: Racing
- Sire: Patriotic (TB) (Note: (TB) is an abbreviation for Thoroughbred, a shorthand method of indicating that the horse was not a Quarter Horse.)
- Grandsire: American Flag (TB)
- Dam: Big Bess
- Maternal grandsire: Sonora Harmon
- Sex: Mare
- Foaled: 1947
- Country: United States
- Color: Bay
- Breeder: James Hunt
- Owner: Mr. Lumpkin; A. B. Green

Record
- 81–21–23–9, AAA speed rating Stakes record: 6–4–3

Earnings
- $32,836.00 (equivalent to $394,600 in 2025)

Awards
- AQHA Race Register of Merit; AQHA Superior Race Horse

Honors
- American Quarter Horse Hall of Fame; AQHA Dam of Distinction
- Last updated on: September 11, 2009.

Barbara L (1947–1977) was an American Quarter Horse that raced during the early 1950s and often defeated some of the best racehorses of the time. She earned $32,836 (equivalent to $390,000 in 2025) on the race track in 81 starts and 21 wins, including six wins in stakes races. She set two track records during her racing career. After retiring from racing in 1955, she went on to become a broodmare and had 14 foals, including 11 who earned their Race Register of Merit with the American Quarter Horse Association (AQHA). Her offspring earned more than $200,000 in race money. She died in 1977 and was inducted into the AQHA's American Quarter Horse Hall of Fame in 2007.

== Early life ==
Barbara L was foaled in 1947, a bay daughter of a Thoroughbred stallion named Patriotic and a Quarter Horse broodmare named Big Bess. She was registered with the AQHA as number 146,954. Her sire, or father, was a grandson of Man o' War, while her dam, or mother, descended from the Quarter Horse Peter McCue. Barbara L was registered as bred by James Hunt of Sonora, Texas, and her owner at the time of registration was A. B. Green, of Purcell, Oklahoma.

As a yearling, Barbara L was sold at auction for $140 (equivalent to $1,900 in 2025) to a Mr. Lumpkin, who sold horse trailers for a living. She spent the next period of her life demonstrating trailers across Texas before someone suggested that Lumpkin race her. Lumpkin changed her name from "Anthem" to "Barbara L" in honor of his daughter Barbara, who was the filly's first trainer.

== Racing career ==
Barbara L's first race was in 1949 at Del Rio, Texas, where she came in fourth and only rated a B speed index (a measure of how fast a horse ran in a race). She did not win a race until her third start that year, completing a 440 yards (400 m) course in 23.4 seconds. In the following years, she raced at Centennial Race Track in Colorado; at Raton in New Mexico; at Albuquerque, New Mexico; at Phoenix, Arizona; at Los Alamitos Race Track in California; and at Bay Meadows Race Track. She raced for Lumpkin until 1952, when she was sold to A. B. Green. (Note: The American Quarter Horse Hall of Fame says that she was sold in 1951, for $3,500 (equivalent to $43,400 in 2025). The AQHA does not list Lumpkin as an owner at all, just listing Hunt as the breeder and Green as the owner, and giving 1947 as the date of Green's ownership. AQHA computer records for the early years of the organization do not always contain all information available, as the information was computerized in the late 1960s.) Green raced her until May 1955, when her last start was recorded with the AQHA.

Barbara L raced for seven years, starting 81 times. She ended her career on the track with 21 victories, 23 seconds, and nine third-place finishes. During her racing career, she beat a number of the top racehorses of her time: Stella Moore, Blob Jr, Bart BS, Johnny Dial, and Monita. She won six stakes races, placed second in four, and came in third in three. Her earnings on the racetrack were $32,836 (equivalent to $390,000 in 2025). The stakes wins were the Speedwell Handicap, the Del Rio Feature, the Bart BS Stakes, the Miss Princess Invitational Handicap, Maddon's Bright Eyes Handicap, and the Pima County Fair Premier Stakes. She set two track records—one at Centennial for 400 yards (370 m) with 20.2 seconds, the other at Los Alamitos for 400 yards (370 m) with 20.5 seconds—and equaled the 350-yard (320 m) track record at Los Alamitos with an 18.5 second run. The AQHA awarded her a Race Register of Merit and a Superior Race Horse award.

== Broodmare career ==
As a broodmare, Barbara L produced eleven foals who earned their Race Register of Merit with the AQHA. Four of her foals earned speed ratings of AAAT, which would translate to speed indexes of 100 or better in current usage. She had 14 foals; collectively, they started 230 times on the racetrack, winning 52 races and earning $262,042 (equivalent to $2,677,100 in 2025) in races. Two of her foals won Superior Race Horse Awards: Cuter Yet, and Mr Walt. Her leading money earner was Barbara 3, who earned more than $100,000.

Barbara L's first foal was Mr. Bruce, a chestnut stallion foaled in 1956 and sired by the Thoroughbred stallion Three Bars. He started 25 races, of which he won six, earning $8,283 (equivalent to $91,500 in 2025) on the track. He earned an AAA speed index and placed second once and third once in stakes races. Barbara L's next foal was Miss Olene, a bay mare sired by Leo and foaled in 1957. She started 33 races and won 11 times, including one stakes race. She earned an AAAT speed index and finished third in the 1959 All American Futurity while earning $31,022 (equivalent to $334,200 in 2025) in total racing earnings. Polly Jane, a bay mare sired by Go Man Go, was Barbara L's 1958 foal. Polly Jane started 21 times, winning four races, achieving an AAA speed index, and earning $3,961 (equivalent to $42,700 in 2025). In 1959, Barbara L's foal was Mr. Walt, a bay stallion by Vandy. Mr. Walt started 55 times and had a AAAT speed index. He won nine races, including one stakes race, earning him $9,417 (equivalent to $93,400 in 2025). In 1960, Barbara L produced Barbara 2, a sorrel mare by Leo. Barbara 2 raced 11 times, winning 2 races with $2,847 (equivalent to $30,300 in 2025) in earnings and a AAAT speed index.

Barbara L's next two foals, Go Doctor and Barbara 1, did not race, but the foal born in 1963, Barbara L's Boy, started 12 times and won twice. He was sired by Depth Bars and won $1,312 (equivalent to $12,700 in 2025) and earned a AAA speed index. In 1964, Barbara L had Barbara 3, a sorrel mare sired by the Thoroughbred Top Deck. Barbara 3 started 19 races and won seven times, including one stakes race. Her best speed index was AAAT and she earned $100,692 (equivalent to $972,300 in 2025). Barbara L's next foal, in 1965, was Top Decker, a brown stallion also by Top Deck. He started five times and earned a AAA speed index and $98 (equivalent to $860 in 2025). Barbara L did not have a foal in 1966, but in 1967 she had a bay mare named Cuter Yet by Jet Deck. Cuter Yet started 27 races and won 5 times, including 2 stakes races. Cuter Yet's race earnings were $98,806 (equivalent to $819,100 in 2025), and her highest speed index was 98. In 1968, Barbara L had Barbara Meyers, a bay mare by Kid Meyers. Barbara Meyers started six times and earned an 89 speed index and $1,082 (equivalent to $8,600 in 2025). Barbara L's 1969 foal, Peggy Rollins, did not race, but her last foal, Barbara El, a bay mare also by Kid Meyers, started 16 times and won 3 races. Barbara El won $4,522 (equivalent to $32,800 in 2025) and an 80 speed index.

== Death and legacy ==
Barbara L died in 1977. A stakes race was named in her honor and run at Ruidoso Downs, New Mexico in 1956. In 2006, she earned a Dam of Distinction award from the AQHA; she was inducted into the AQHA Hall of Fame in 2007.

== Pedigree ==
Fair Play (TB)
Man o' War (TB)
Mahubah (TB)
American Flag (TB)
Roi Herode (TB)
Lady Comfey (TB)
Snoot (TB)
Patriotic (TB)
Ben Brush (TB)
Sweep (TB)
Pink Domino (TB)
Moonlight (TB)
Eyebrow (TB)
Sasenta (TB)
Miss Mae Day (TB)
Barbara L
Harmon Baker
Sealskin
Bessie A
Sonora Harmon
unknown
Monte Carter quarter mare
unknown
Big Bess
Hondo
Sam King
mare by Sykes' Rondo
mare by Sam King
unknown
