= Ronas Ryon =

Quarter Horse racehorse and sire

- Breed: Quarter Horse
- Discipline: Racing
- Sire: Windy Ryon
- Grandsire: Go Man Go
- Dam: Rona Bar
- Maternal grandsire: Three Bargains
- Sex: Stallion
- Foaled: 1984
- Country: United States
- Breeder: James Floyd Plummer

Record
- 23-18-4-0, SI-105

Earnings
- over $1,700,000.00

Major wins
- All American Futurity, All American Derby, Graham Farms Derby

Honors
- American Quarter Horse Hall of Fame
- Last updated on: January 12, 2008.

Winner of the All American Futurity and the All American Derby, Ronas Ryon (born 1984) only finished off the board in a Quarter Horse race once in twenty-three starts, winning eighteen of his starts, and placing second in four.

== Life ==
Ronas Ryon was a 1984 son of Windy Ryon, out of a daughter of Three Bargains. Three Bargains was a son of Three Bars (TB). Ronas Ryon second dam was a descendant of Wimpy P-1. He died in May 2000.

== Racing career ==
Ronas Ryon started twenty-three times on the Quarter tracks, winning eighteen times, coming in second four times. He only finished off the board once. He won the 1986 All American Futurity. He also won the All American Derby and over $1,700,000.00 in racing earnings.

== Breeding record ==
After retiring, Ronas Ryon went on to sire over a thousand foals, including an All American Derby winner in I Hear A Symphony.

== Honors ==
Ronas Ryon was inducted into the American Quarter Horse Association's (or AQHA) Hall of Fame in 2004.

== Pedigree ==
Equestrian (TB)
Top Deck
River Boat (TB)
Go Man Go
Very Wise (TB)
Lightfoot Sis
Clear Track
Windy Ryon
Depth Charge (TB)
Dividend
Diamond Chick
Silent Light
Beau Max (TB)
Lantana Belle (TB)
Lantana Queen (TB)
Ronas Ryon
Percentage (TB)
Three Bars (TB)
Myrtle Dee (TB)
Three Bargains
Joe Moore
Little Marina Adams
Marina
Rona Bar
Wimpy P-1
Sanddrift
La Tachita
Sand Juana
Chester Brown
Bama Paprika
Petes Spice
