= Shue Fly =

Quarter Horse race horse and broodmare

- Breed: Quarter Horse
- Discipline: Racing
- Sire: Cowboy P-12
- Grandsire: Yellow Jacket
- Dam: Lady Luck
- Maternal grandsire: Booger Red
- Sex: Mare
- Foaled: 1937
- Country: United States
- Color: Chestnut
- Breeder: Lloyd Miller
- Owner: Hepler Brothers

Record
- 11 starts: 10-1-0; AAA speed rating

Awards
- 1941 & 1942 & 1943 World Champion Quarter Running Horse

Honors
- American Quarter Horse Hall of Fame

Shue Fly (1937–1963) was a Quarter Horse mare who was one of the dominant racehorses on the racetrack during the 1940s.

== Life ==
Shue Fly was registered with the American Quarter Horse Association (or AQHA) as number 717. She was a chestnut mare, foaled in 1937 and bred by Lloyd Miller of Chamita, New Mexico. She was owned by the Hepler Brothers of Carlsbad, New Mexico at the time she was registered. Her sire was Cowboy P-12, and she was out of Lady Luck by Booger Red by Rancocas, a Thoroughbred. The second dam was an unnamed Thoroughbred mare. Through her sire, she descended from Yellow Jacket and Peter McCue twice. Her dam was a descendant of Iroquois, the first American bred Thoroughbred to win a major race in England. Some early reports had her dam as a mare named Nancy M who was by Jack McCue (a son of Peter McCue) and out of Fanny by Jack McCue. However, the Hepler brothers, who raced and then used Shue Fly as a broodmare, investigated her background and came to the conclusion that she was out of Lady Luck.

== Racing career ==
During Shue Fly's racing career she was named the World Champion Quarter Running Horse for 1941–1942, for 1942–1943, and for 1943–1944. The official AQHA records show her starting six times, with two wins and a top speed rating of AAA. However, the 1946 Yearbook of the American Quarter Racing Association (or AQRA) states that she had won ten of eleven starts. Her very first race was when she was three, and had just been broke to ride, when she went up against Question Mark in a half mile race. She finished second, but it was a good finish for a green-broke mare. Next, in December 1941, she was matched against Clabber at the distance of a quarter mile, and won, setting a track record in the process. In the 1942 Championship race, she went to her knees coming out of the starting gate, but managed to get up and finish first by a nose, beating Clabber, Nobodies Friend and Joe Tom.

== Broodmare record ==
As a broodmare, Shue Fly produced three foals that earned a Race Register of Merit, including Royal Charge.

== Death and honors ==
She died in 1963.

Shue Fly was inducted into the AQHA Hall of Fame in 2005.

== Pedigree ==
Lock's Rondo
Little Rondo
Minnie Franks
Yellow Jacket
Lock's Rondo
Barbee Dun
Mary Lee
Cowboy P-12
John Wilkens
Stalks
Cora
Roan Lady
John Wilkens
Bonnie Wilkens
Jarene
Shue Fly
Iroquois (TB)
Rancocas (TB)
Ontario (TB)
Booger Red
Blue Dick
Heely
Mittie Stephens
Lady Luck
unknown
Thoroughbred mare
unknown
