= Garrett's Miss Pawhuska =

20th-century Quarter Horse racehorse mare

- – Garrett's Miss Pawhuska at 15 years old –
- Breed: Quarter Horse
- Discipline: Racing
- Sire: Leo
- Grandsire: Joe Reed II
- Dam: Jenny Dee
- Maternal grandsire: Jimmie Allred
- Sex: mare
- Foaled: 1946
- Country: United States
- Color: sorrel
- Breeder: Bill Rowe
- Owner: Dee Garrett

Record
- 6-6-0-0

Earnings
- $250.00 (:equivalent to $3,400 in 2025)

Awards
- AQHA Racing Register of Merit

Honors
- American Quarter Horse Hall of Fame
- Last updated on: May 18, 2009.

Garrett's Miss Pawhuska (1946–1975) was a Quarter Horse broodmare who produced eight foals, three of which would become world champion race horses. When she was a yearling, she was sold by her owner, although he had not really planned on selling her. He felt he had to because one of his employees had told a customer the filly was for sale.

Garrett's Miss Pawhuska's official race record lists her with six wins in six starts, but it is incomplete and is missing some earnings as well as some races. After racing for two years, she retired to become a broodmare and died in 1975 at age 29. Her son Vandy's Flash was the first gelding to be named a World Champion Quarter Running Horse. She was inducted into the American Quarter Horse Association Hall of Fame.

== Early life ==
Garrett's Miss Pawhuska was a 1946 sorrel mare sired by Leo and out of Jenny Dee, a daughter of Jimmie Allred. Her dam (mother) was out of a mare named Big Bay, who was of unknown breeding. Jimmie Allred was sired by Dan whose father was Old Joe Bailey. Jimmie Allred's dam was Alice McGill who was sired by Little Hickory Bill, a son of Hickory Bill who was sired by Peter McCue Garrett's Miss Pawhuska was bred by Bill Rowe of Carlsbad, New Mexico, but by the time she was a yearling she was owned by Earl Jackson, of Pawhuska, Oklahoma. It isn't clear if Jackson bought Garrett's Miss Pawhuska as a foal or if he bought Garrett's Miss Pawhuska's dam while she was still carrying Garrett's Miss Pawhuska.

When Garrett's Miss Pawhuska was a yearling, Dee Garrett visited Jackson's ranch and one of Jackson's ranch hands told him the filly was for sale for $200 (equivalent to $2,900 in 2025). Although Jackson had not planned to sell the filly, he felt obligated to complete the sale because his employee had put a price on her.

== Race career ==
Although Garrett's widow later described Garrett's Miss Pawhuska as "scrawny—she looked like a jackrabbit then", Garrett trained her for the track and she raced as a two-year-old and three-year-old. Her first race was the Oklahoma Futurity in 1948, where she won her qualifying heat and won the finals by a nose. The finals' start was delayed, but even after the delay, Garrett's Miss Pawhuska won, beating Savannah G, Lapped, and Red River Pride. Her time for the 220 yards (200 m) race was 12.7 seconds.

Although Garrett's Miss Pawhuska's official record with the American Quarter Horse Association (or AQHA) is six starts and six wins, the early records are not all entered into the AQHA's computers and the official charts published in the 1940s show she lost a match race to Gin High. However, the published race chart for the race noted that she was leading the race until she ran over a stake 50 yards (46 m) before the end of the race, which caused her to lose the race. She earned a Race ROM and $250 (equivalent to $3,400 in 2025) in her official records. The official earnings only reflect one race, a match race in 1949, but they don't list the other purses she earned, including the $1,000 (equivalent to $13,400 in 2025) purse for the 1948 Oklahoma Futurity. She also is claimed to have won a match race worth $2,500 (equivalent to $33,800 in 2025), although this was an unofficial race.

Garrett's Miss Pawhuska's jockey at the time, C. W. Cascio said of her when he raced her at Del Rio, Texas, "I thought she was going to have to go all out just to keep up with those big two-year-olds—what with her little enough to run under their bellies." Her last race was at Enid, Oklahoma, and it was a match race against Bob K K, which she won.

== Breeding career ==
Garrett's Miss Pawhuska's owner, Dee Garrett, bred her to his champion stallion Vandy, and produced three world champions: Vandy's Flash, Vanetta Dee, and Vannevar. Vansarita Too set a new track record and Vandy's Betty and Miss Vanity earned AAA speed ratings. Her first foal was Vandy's Betty, who went on to earn an AAA rating on the race track and became the dam of Mr. Van Deck. Her next foal was Vanetta Dee, who racked up 94 starts with 31 wins, 20 seconds and 16 thirds in six years of racing. Her total earnings were $83,325 (equivalent to $920,300 in 2025). Vannevar was the next foal, and was AQHA Champion Racing Gelding in 1956 and 1957. Garrett's Miss Pawhuska's 1954 foal was Vandy's Flash, who was the first gelding named World Champion Quarter Running Horse, in 1960. Garrett's Miss Pawhuska's 1955 foal was Vansarita, who was never raced. A number of miscarriages followed, but in 1958 Garrett's Miss Pawhuska produced Miss Vanity, another AAA-rated racehorse. Garrett's Miss Pawhuska slipped, or lost, her next two foals, but produced Vansarita Too in 1961, who also earned an AAA on the race track. Garrett's Miss Pawhuska's last foal by Vandy was Vandy's Flash, a stallion, who was never raced but sired 107 foals. Garrett's Miss Pawhuska's last foal was not by Vandy, but was by a son of Three Bars named The Ole Man, but the gelding was never raced.

== Death and legacy ==
Garrett's Miss Pawhuska died at the age of 29 in 1975. She was buried on the Garretts' ranch outside Pawhuska. Garrett's grandson said of her that "She was very gentle, the kind of mare you could do anything with." He also said of her "I guess you could say she was a family pet. I used to ride her out to the pastures to round up other mares, things like that." She was on the leading dams of Race ROM earners from 1959 through 1969.

Garrett's Miss Pawhuska was inducted into the AQHA's AQHA Hall of Fame in 2006. Garrett's Miss Pawhuska also has a stakes race named in her honor at Remington Park Track in Oklahoma City.

== Pedigree ==
Joe Blair (TB)
Joe Reed
Della Moore
Joe Reed II
Fleeting Time (TB)
Nellene
Little Red Nell
Leo
Joe Blair (TB)
Joe Reed
Della Moore
Little Fanny
Ashwell (TB)
Fanny Ashwell
Fannie Richardson
Garrett's Miss Pawhuska
Old Joe Bailey
Dan
June Bug
Jimmie Allred
Little Hickory Bill
Alice McGill
mare by Mac
Jenny Dee
unknown
unknown
unknown
Big Bay
unknown
unknown
unknown
