= Chicado V =

Quarter Horse champion race mare

- Chicado V as a three-year-old
- Breed: Quarter Horse
- Discipline: Racing
- Sire: Chicaro Bill
- Grandsire: Chicaro (TB)
- Dam: Do Good
- Maternal grandsire: St. Louis
- Sex: Mare
- Foaled: 1950
- Country: United States
- Color: Brown
- Breeder: Frank Vessels

Record
- 6-3-1-1; AAAT speed rating

Earnings
- $5,215.00 (equivalent to $62,800 in 2025)

Awards
- Co-Champion Quarter Running 2-Yr-Old Filly (1952)

Honors
- American Quarter Horse Hall of Fame
- Last updated on: May 19, 2009.

Chicado V (1950 – February 1972) was a Champion Quarter Horse racehorse foaled (born) in 1950, and considered one of the outstanding broodmares of her breed. She was bred by Frank Vessels of Los Alamitos, California, and trained by Earl Holmes.

Chicado V started only six times because knee problems cut short her racing career. However, she won her first two starts while breaking or equaling track records, and was given the title of co-Champion Quarter Running Two-Year-Old Filly by the American Quarter Horse Association (AQHA) in 1952. The next year she ran her last four races, winning once and setting one more speed record. After her last race, in December 1953, she was retired from the track to become a broodmare, and had nine foals. Two of her offspring were named Champion Quarter Running Horses, and all her foals had a total of seven stakes race wins. One of her daughters, Table Tennis, went on to become a noted broodmare herself, as did Table Tennis' daughter Rapid Volley and granddaughter Perks. However, three of Chicado V's sons—Triple Chick, Three Chicks, and The Ole Man—were her best-known offspring; all three became leading sires and are the main cause of her fame. She was inducted into the AQHA's American Quarter Horse Hall of Fame in 2006.

== Early life ==
Chicado V (Note: The "V" stood for Vessels, the last name of her breeder.) was bred by Frank Vessels of Los Alamitos, California and foaled in 1950. She was a member of the Quarter Horse breed, and the AQHA registered her in their stud book as number 29,689. She was a daughter of Chicaro Bill out of the broodmare Do Good, herself a member of the AQHA Hall of Fame. Chicado V was a full sister to Senor Bill, an outstanding racehorse and breeding stallion, as well as a half-sister to Clabber II and Do Win, two other outstanding racehorses. (Note: A full sibling, in horse terminology, is a horse with the same sire and dam. A half-sibling is a horse with the same dam, or mother. Because stallions can sire large numbers of offspring, the half-sibling terminology is reserved for horses with the same dam. Two horses with the same sire, but different dams are usually referred to as "by the same sire") Chicaro Bill's dam, or mother, was a mare named Verna Grace, who was known as Fair Chance when she raced. Through Chicaro Bill, Chicado V was a descendant of the AQHA Hall of Fame member Traveler as well as the Thoroughbred Hall of Fame member Peter Pan. On her dam's side, she traced to Louisiana Quarter Horse bloodlines as well as to the AQHA Hall of Famer Peter McCue.

When mature, Chicado V stood 15.0 hands (60 inches, 152 cm) tall. She was a brown mare, with a connected star, stripe, and snip on her face as her only markings, or identifying marks. Earl Holmes, a longtime trainer who started his racing career as a groom for Vessels, had the care of Chicado V after she was born, and said of her that she "was gentle, real gentle—in everything. She was born broke[n]." When she stood in a starting gate for a race, Holmes said she looked like a rabbit, because "she had big ears and that's all you could see, she was so little". She also had a body defect, or conformation fault, in that she had calf-knees. (Note: Calf-kneed horses have front legs that over flex, and when looked at from the sides, the front legs are concave, with the legs not straight up and down, but with the knees slightly curved towards the horse's rear end. Calf-knees are a problem in that the joint is less sturdy than normal knees and can lead to an increased probability of damage to the ligaments and tendons of the leg. The horse also has a jarring gait, and less pulling power with the front legs. The chances of damage are greater when running on hard ground, when landing from jumping, or when stopping quickly after galloping.)

== Racing career ==
Chicado V was sent out for race training as a two-year-old, at first to her owner's trainer, Farrell Jones, who liked neither her calf-knees nor her habit of running poorly in training. She consistently hung behind the other horses in group training runs, and Jones sent her back to Vessels, who then sent her to trainer Eddie Moreno. Moreno finished her training and sent her to the track for her first race, a 350-yard (320 m) contest that she won while setting a new track record for a two-year-old of 18.1 seconds. Her performance persuaded Jones to relent, and he took her back to his training barn. Her knees would not allow her to be raced often, and she only started once more as a two-year-old, a 220-yard (200 m) race at Bay Meadows Racetrack that she won while equaling the track record of 17.2 seconds for the distance.

After an 11-month break, Chicado V returned to the track as a three-year-old, but her legs continued to create problems. She started four times during her three-year-old year, winning once, with one second and one third place. In her win at Pomona, the site of her first win, she lowered the track record for the 350-yard (320 m) distance from 18.1 to 17.9 seconds. Her knees continued to be a problem, and although she never broke down or became unable to run, she retired in December 1953.

As a racehorse, Chicado V ran up a record of three wins, one second, and one third, in six starts over two years. She earned a Race Register of Merit in 1952 from the AQHA, the lowest level racing award given by the AQHA, as well as the highest possible speed rating of AAAT, a measure of how fast she was able to run. She was a stakes race winner, or winner of a race run by the higher quality horses, and was given the title of co-Champion Quarter Running Two-Year-Old Filly by the AQHA in 1952. (Note: AQHA has a set of year-end titles that are awarded for racing, one for each gender and age combination, which are titled "Champion Quarter Running Horse" then the age and gender. Horses awarded those titles in a year are then eligible for consideration as "World Champion Quarter Running Horse" for that year. Champion Quarter Running Horse titles should not be confused with AQHA Champion titles, which are automatically gained by a horse when it meets certain showing requirements. Nor should "Champion Quarter Running Horse" be confused with the title of "World Champion" in a certain showing event, as that is awarded at the World Show held yearly by the AQHA.) Her race earnings were $5,215 (equivalent to $62,800 in 2025), although the official race record from the AQHA does not list any stakes wins. Many of the early racing records did not make it into the AQHA's computers, so the lack of stakes wins on the record does not mean that other records recording them are incorrect.

== Broodmare career ==
As a broodmare, Chicado V gave birth to nine foals, or babies, between 1955 and 1968, seven stallions and two mares. Seven earned their Race Register of Merit with the AQHA. Four of her foals—Triple Chick, Three Chicks, The Ole Man, and Chicado Chick—were sired by Three Bars (TB), (Note: (TB) is an abbreviation for Thoroughbred, indicating that the horse was not a Quarter Horse.) a member of the AQHA Hall of Fame. Her other five foals were sired by five different stallions, respectively, War Bam, Spotted Bull, Anchor Watch, Double Bid, and fellow Hall of Famer Go Man Go. In a 1959 interview, Vessels felt that Chicado V was the best broodmare he owned. Vessels further stated that he "wouldn't part with her" and that he "would be crazy to sell her".

Chicado V's first foal was Triple Chick, who was fathered by Three Bars, a 1955 brown stallion. Triple Chick was unraced, (Note: He foundered and was unable to race.) but he remains number 48 on the AQHA's All Time Leading Broodmares Sire List By Winners, a listing of maternal grandsires of race horses arranged by the number of wins their grandget, or grandchildren, have won as of the end of 2007. Her next foal was War Chic, a 1956 sorrel stallion, who was rated AAAT on the racetrack. He was also a stakes winner, and won 12 out of 21 starts with earnings of $35,453 (equivalent to $382,000 in 2025). War Chic was named Champion Two-Year Old Colt in 1958. Chicado V's next foal was a mare, named Table Tennis, who won two stakes races, as well as eight other races, out of 35 starts, with an AAAT rating and $35,197 (equivalent to $379,200 in 2025). She was named Champion Three Year Old Filly in 1960. Chicado V's fourth foal was Three Chicks, a 1959 brown stallion, and a full sibling to Triple Chick. Three Chicks won two stakes races, along with one other race in ten starts. He was rated AAAT on the track as well as earning an AQHA Champion award in the show ring after his racing career was over. His total race earnings were $22,625 (equivalent to $237,900 in 2025). Three Chicks remains number 42 on the AQHA's All Time Leading Broodmare Sires By Winners.

In 1960, Chicado V foaled Chicado Chick, a bay stallion, another full sibling to Three Chicks and Triple Chick. Chicado Chick started 11 times on the track, winning twice for $1,752 (equivalent to $17,900 in 2025) in race earnings along with an AAA speed rating, the second highest speed rating possible at the time. He also earned a Performance Register of Merit and an AQHA Championship from the AQHA as a show horse after his racing career was over. The 1961 foal was Anchor Chic, a bay stallion. Anchor Chic started 16 times, with three wins for total earnings of $2,126 (equivalent to $21,700 in 2025) and an AAAT speed rating. Chicado V had no foal in 1962, but in 1963, she foaled The Ole Man, a sorrel stallion and another full sibling to Triple Chick, Three Chicks, and Chicado Chick. The Ole Man won two stakes races as well as 6 other races in 33 starts. He earned an AAAT speed rating and $20,657 (equivalent to $205,000 in 2025) total race winnings. The Ole Man remains number 55 on the All Time Leading Broodmare Sires By Winners. Chicado V's penultimate foal was Successor, a bay stallion who started seven times, but never won a race; he was rated AA on the track. Chicado V's last foal, Alisal, was a 1968 bay mare who never raced.

Chicado V's foals won seven stakes races for total prize money of $118,107 (equivalent to $1,093,500 in 2025), and two earned AQHA Championships. Table Tennis went on to become an outstanding broodmare herself, foaling Rapid Volley by Three Bars (TB), among others. Rapid Volley produced Perks by Easy Jet. Perks was another outstanding broodmare who continued the maternal family success, but it was as a dam of stallions that Chicado V is best known; three of her sons—Triple Chick, Three Chicks, and The Ole Man—became leading race sires. Triple Chick not only sired race horses but show horses as well, including Boston Mac and Triple's Image. Three Chicks sired the All American Futurity winner Three Oh's and the racehorse stallion Azure Three. The Ole Man sired 1,876 foals, including 15 stakes winners and 10 AQHA Champions.

== Death and legacy ==
Chicado V died in February 1972, while in foal to Alamitos Bar. A stakes race at Los Alamitos Race Course was named in her honor, starting in 1960. In 2006, she was inducted into the AQHA Hall of Fame.

== Pedigree ==
=Spearmint (TB) (Note: An equals sign in front of a horse indicates the horse lived its entire life outside the United States.)
*Chicle (TB) (Note: An asterisk before a horse's name means that it was imported into the United States from another country.)
Lady Hamburg II (TB)
Chicaro (TB) (Note: (TB) is an abbreviation for Thoroughbred, indicating that the horse was not a Quarter Horse.)
Peter Pan (TB)
Wendy (TB)
Remembrance (TB)
Chicaro Bill
Traveler
Little Joe
Jenny
Verna Grace
Horace H (TB)
Johnny Wilkens
Wilkins quarter mare
Chicado V
*Kilkerrun (TB)
Eck Davis (TB)
Miss Ross (TB)
St Louis
Dewey (TB)
Old Flossie
mare by Old DJ
Do Good
Baby
Duggan
Old Flossie by Dewey (TB)
Flossie
Harmon Baker
Old Floridene
Little Dutch
