= FL Lady Bug =

Quarter Horse broodmare

- Breed: Quarter Horse
- Sire: Sergeant
- Grandsire: Billy McCue
- Dam: Yeager's Lady JA
- Maternal grandsire: Will Stead
- Sex: Mare
- Foaled: 1945
- Country: United States
- Color: Sorrel
- Breeder: W. A. Yeager
- Owner: Marvin and Lela Barnes

Honors
- American Quarter Horse Hall of Fame

FL Lady Bug (1945–1974) was a Quarter Horse mare who was never raced or was shown in a horse show, yet was made famous for her speedy offspring.

== Life ==
FL Lady Bug was registered as number 9733 in the American Quarter Horse Association's (or AQHA) stud book. A sorrel mare, she was foaled in 1945 and bred by W. A. Yeager of Woodward, Oklahoma. Her owners at the time she was registered were Bill and Alive Likins of Davis, Oklahoma. Her sire, Sergeant, was bred to a daughter of his full brother, Will Stead, to produce Lady Bug. Thus, FL Lady Bug was inbred to both Billy McCue and Silver. Her second dam was an unnamed quarter mare from the J A Ranch in Texas.

== Breeding record ==
FL Lady Bug had fourteen foals, eleven of whom started races. Ten of those starters were winners, with one Champion Quarter Running Two Year Old Filly – Top Ladybug, three stakes winners, and ten Race Register of Merit winners. All ten of her Register of Merit qualifiers were sired by different stallions.

== Death and honors ==
She died on March 1, 1974.

FL Lady Bug was inducted into the AQHA Hall of Fame in 1999.

== Pedigree ==
Peter McCue
Jack McCue
Marguerite
Billy McCue
Chickasha Bob
Sorrel Alice
Maud
Sergeant
Pid Hart
Chickasha Bob
Mary Keith
Silver
Old Billy
Maud
Old Alice
FL Lady Bug
Jack McCue
Billy McCue
Sorrel Alice
Will Stead
Chickasha Bob
Silver
Maud
Yeager's Lady JA
unknown
JA Ranch quarter mare
unknown
