= Skipper W =

Quarter Horse stallion

- Breed: American Quarter Horse
- Sire: Nick Shoemaker
- Grandsire: Nick
- Dam: Hired Girl
- Maternal grandsire: Cowboy P-12
- Sex: Stallion
- Foaled: 1945
- Country: United States
- Color: Sorrel
- Breeder: H. J. Wiescamp
- Owner: H. J. Wiescamp

Honors
- AQHA Hall of Fame

Skipper W (1945–1963) was an American Quarter Horse and a famous breeding stallion. Despite not being shown in many horse shows, he went on to become the senior stallion of his breeder's reproductive program. Although he sired only 132 offspring, the products of his breeder's program are often known as "Skipper W" horses. He was inducted into the American Quarter Horse Hall of Fame in 2011.

== Early life ==
Skipper W was a 1945 sorrel stallion bred by H. J. Wiescamp of Alamosa, Colorado. Sired by Nick Shoemaker, whose father was Nick sired by Shiek P-11, Skipper W was out of Hired Girl, a daughter of Cowboy P-12. His second dam, or maternal grandmother, was Leche, who was also fathered by Nick by Shiek P-11. The colt was named Skipper W because, as Wiescamp related:

I had another good stud colt born around the same time as Skipper. He was a palomino sired by Gold Mount and out of Slipalong Wiescamp. That was also the year that the good movie, Showboat, came out and I named the little yellow colt after that picture. Anyway, I had Hired Girl up in a corral and, after she foaled, I told a fellow who was working for me to disinfect the naval on the colt [Skipper W]. After the man did that, the colt got up and turned around and kicked him 'cause it smarted. I said to that fellow, "Look at that, he already knows he's the boss! I've got a showboat, and every boat needs a skipper, so that's what I'm going to name him – Skipper." I added the W for Wiescamp.

Wiescamp had attempted to sell Hired Girl while she was pregnant with Skipper W, but at $150 (equivalent to $2,700 in 2025), did not get any buyers. While the colt was a weanling, Wiescamp priced him at $500 (equivalent to $8,900 in 2025), and the one potential purchaser decided it was too high a price for a colt the buyer planned to make into a gelding. When Skipper W was a yearling, another possible buyer, who was wanting a potential breeding stallion, looked at the colt, but when they found out that Wiescamp wanted $1500 (equivalent to $24,800 in 2025) for the horse decided against purchasing. Instead, Skipper W spent his entire life with Wiescamp.

Wiescamp had Skipper W trained as a riding horse when he was a two-year-old, and the ranch hand who did the training said after a couple of days of working him in a small corral, he "just got on him. And the first time I got on him, I just turned this colt around, clucked to him, and just kind of spanked him with the rein a little bit. And the colt took to it and just walked off. That's the way he was. The colt never hopped up, he never done nothing." The same ranch hand later used Skipper W as a roping horse, and said that the horse really liked to do ranch work. At the age of three years, Skipper W was about 15 hands high (60 inches (150 centimeters) and weighed about 1,250 pounds (570 kilograms).

Wiescamp showed Skipper W as a halter horse three times when the stallion was four years old. Skipper W was named grand champion stallion at the three shows he attended: the 1948 National Western Stock Show in Denver, the 1948 Colorado State Fair, and the 1948 New Mexico State Fair. Wiescamp later remarked that "I'm glad now that we didn't show him more, because he would have been before the public so much that he probably would have been sold." However, Skipper W's American Quarter Horse Association, or AQHA, show record does not show any record of these wins, which is not unusual for horses shown in the 1940s, as the record keeping was not always the best during the early years of the AQHA.

== Breeding career ==
In early 1948, Nick Shoemaker, Wiescamp's senior stallion and Skipper W's sire, died in a freak accident while in his paddock, slipping on some ice and breaking his neck against a fence. This meant that Skipper W's show career was cut short so that he could replace his sire as the main breeding stallion. During his entire career, Skipper W was never bred to any mare that was not owned by Wiescamp. Wiescamp wanted to make sure that the mares that he bred his stallions to were the best possible matches for the particular stallion. From the time of Nick Shoemaker's death until Skipper W's own death, the horse remained Wiescamp's senior stallion.

During his breeding career, he sired 18 foal crops, with a total of 132 horses registered with the AQHA. Among his offspring were Skip's Dilly, the 1964 AQHA High Point Western Pleasure Mare; Skipette, the 1964 AQHA High Point Calf Roping Mare; and Skip Sir Bar, the 1968 AQHA High Point Steer Roping Horse. As well, he sired 13 AQHA Champions, 7 Superior Halter Horses, and 18 Performance Register of Merit earners. He sired four horses that earned a Race Register of Merit with the AQHA.

Skipper W died in 1963, probably of a heart attack. Wiescamp kept 7 of his sons as breeding stallions and 57 of his daughters as broodmares in Wiescamp's linebreeding program.

Although he did not sire a great number of horses, the linebreeding program that Wiescamp followed led to the products of that program often being called "Skipper W horses". The horse was inducted into the AQHA Hall of Fame in 2011.

== Pedigree ==
Peter McCue
Shiek P-11
Pet by Old Fred
Nick
Bob H by Old Fred
Sylvia
Nick Shoemaker
Little Chief (TB)
Lani Chief (TB)
Skipalong Wiescamp
Jiggs by Fred Litz by Old Fred
Slippers
Skipper W
Yellow Jacket
Cowboy P-12
Roan Lady
Hired Girl
Shiek P-11
Nick
Sylvia
Leche
Yellow Jacket or Yellow Wolf
Gold Digger
unknown
