= Billy Clegg =

Quarter horse stallion and sire

- Breed: Quarter Horse
- Sire: Paul Ell
- Grandsire: Hickory Bill
- Dam: Bivarita
- Maternal grandsire: Billy Sunday
- Sex: Stallion
- Foaled: 1932
- Country: United States
- Color: Bay
- Breeder: Bernard Adams
- Owner: Guy M. Troutman

Honors
- American Quarter Horse Hall of Fame

A Quarter Horse stallion, Billy Clegg (foaled 1932) was a sire during the early years of the American Quarter Horse Association (AQHA).

== Life ==
Billy Clegg was registered as number 427 with the AQHA. His stud book entry gives his information as a bay stallion foaled in 1932, bred by Bernard Adams of Alfred, Texas and his owner at registration as Guy M. Troutman of Tucumcari, New Mexico. His sire was Paul El by Hickory Bill by Peter McCue and his dam was Bivarita by Billy Sunday.

During his breeding career, Billy Clegg sired two AQHA Race Register of Merit earners – Billy Big Enuf and Dust Storm. Nine of his daughters went on to produce Register of Merit earners. He sired on AQHA Champion, Billie B Fisher, and several Superior Performance horses, including Chickasha Mike. Twenty-nine of his daughters produced point earning show horses or racers. Billy Clegg died in 1958.

Billy Clegg was inducted into the AQHA Hall of Fame in 1998.

== Pedigree ==
Dan Tucker
Peter McCue
Nora M (TB)
Hickory Bill
The Hero (TB)
Lucretia M
Bird
Paul Ell
McCoy Billy
Sykes' Rondo
Grasshopper
Baby Ruth
Anthony
May Mangum
Belle Nellie
Billy Clegg
Prince Plenty (TB)
Horace H (TB)
Hindoo Queen (TB)
Billy Sunday
Peter McCue
Carrie Nation
Little Easter (TB)
Bivarita
Sam Bass
Rattler
Desha Martin
mare by Rattler
unknown
