= Maddon's Bright Eyes =

Quarter Horse mare and racehorse

- Breed: Quarter Horse
- Discipline: Racing
- Sire: Gold Mount
- Grandsire: Brush Mount
- Dam: Plaudette
- Maternal grandsire: King Plaudit (TB)
- Sex: Mare
- Foaled: 1946
- Country: United States
- Color: Bay
- Breeder: Charles Shoemaker

Record
- 25 starts: 18-5-0 speed rating AAA

Earnings
- $16,577.00

Awards
- 1949 World Champion Quarter Running Horse; 1951 World Co-Champion Quarter Running Horse

Honors
- American Quarter Horse Hall of Fame

Maddon's Bright Eyes (1946–1958) was a Quarter Horse mare who was a racehorse on the Quarter tracks during around 1950.

== Life ==
Maddon's Bright Eyes was foaled on May 12, 1946, in Albuquerque, New Mexico. On both her sire's side and her dam's side, she traced to King Plaudit (TB) and Peter McCue.

== Racing career ==
Maddon's Bright Eyes raced from 1948 to 1952 before suffering a career-ending injury in her last race, which she finished on three legs in second place. Her record over those five years was twenty-five starts, eighteen wins, and five seconds. She finished off the board only twice. Her earnings were $16,576 with a top speed rating of AAA. She was retired after injuring herself in the August 29, 1952, Championship Dash at Centennial Park. She broke so fast from the gate that she ripped a tendon off her stifle joint, and although she came in second, she was hobbling after the race. She retired holding three mare world records: at 300, 250 and 220 yards.

One of Maddon's Bright Eyes' peculiarities was that she liked raw eggs, and she was fed a dozen a day when she was training at the track. She was also known to chase hens off their eggs in order to eat them.

== Death and honors ==
After producing four foals, Maddon's Bright Eyes became paralyzed in her hindquarters and was humanely put down on June 29, 1958. Two of her foals earned their Race Register of Merit – Bright Bar and Me Bright.

Maddon's Bright Eyes was inducted into the AQHA Hall of Fame in 1997.

She was a half-sister to Bright Eyes Brother, who is a member of the Appaloosa Hall of Fame.

== Pedigree ==
Whisk Broom II (TB)
Chimney Sweep (TB)
Polly Flinders (TB)
Brush Mount
Jiggs
Hula Dancer
mare by Waggoner's Rainy Day P-13
Gold Mount
King Plaudit (TB)
Plaudit
Colorado Queen
Miss Helen
Old Joe by Harmon Baker
Headlight
CS mare by Young Cold Deck
Maddon's Bright Eyes
Himyar (TB)
Plaudit (TB)
*Cindarella (TB)
King Plaudit (TB)
*Knight of the Thistle (TB)
Wild Thistle (TB)
Galliard (TB)
Plaudette
Dan Tucker
Peter McCue
Nora M (TB)
Roberds mare by Peter McCue
Old Fred
Roberds mare by Old Fred
unknown
