= Driftwood (horse) =

Quarter Horse stallion and sire

- Breed: Quarter Horse
- Discipline: Rodeo
- Sire: Miller Boy
- Grandsire: Hobart Horse
- Dam: mare by Barlow
- Maternal grandsire: Barlow
- Sex: Stallion
- Foaled: 1932
- Country: United States
- Color: Bay
- Breeder: Mr. Childress
- Owner: Catherine A & Channing Peake

Honors
- American Quarter Horse Hall of Fame

Driftwood (1932–1960) was originally known as Speedy while he was a rodeo horse. Driftwood was known for siring rodeo and ranch horses.

== Life ==
Driftwood was registered as number 2833 with the American Quarter Horse Association (or AQHA). His stud book entry lists him as a bay horse (meaning stallion in this situation) foaled in 1932, and bred by Mr. Childress of Silverton, Texas. His owners at the time of registration were Catherine A and Chaning Peake of Lompoc, California. His breeding was mostly unknown, with only two lines traceable past the grandparents. Both of those lines traced to Lock's Rondo, however. His second dam was a Thoroughbred mare from Kentucky, although her exact breeding was unknown. His paternal grandsire, the Hobart Horse, is of unknown breeding.

== Rodeo career ==
Driftwood made a name for himself in the late 1930s as a rodeo horse, when he was known as '"Speedy". He was owned by a man named Asbury Schell, who calf roped, team tied, steer roped and bulldogged off the stallion he called Speedy, as well as occasionally stock saddle races. In 1941, the Peake's tried to buy Speedy, but since Schell earned his living as a rodeo cowboy, they were only able to talk Schell into letting them breed seven mares to the stallion that spring. The next year, with World War II rationing curtailing rodeos, Schell finally sold Speedy to the Peakes for $1500. There was some confusion about the stallion's pedigree, and it took three years before the Peakes were able to track down the previous owners before Schell and find out enough of the horse's breeding to register the stallion with the AQHA, and by that time the name "Speedy" had already been registered, so the horse was registered as Driftwood instead.

== Breeding record ==
Driftwood sired two horses that earned their AQHA Race Register of Merit, as well as nine daughters that produced Race Register of Merits. He sired nineteen foals that earned a Performance Register of Merit from the AQHA, and one foal earned a year end High Point Award. Many of his offspring competed on the professional rodeo circuit, where Driftwood made a name for himself by siring more top rodeo horses than any other sire of his time. Among the outstanding rodeo horses he sired were Driftwood Ike and Firewood. Others included Poker Chip Peake and Henny Penny Peake, who won the 1953 and 1954 Pacific Coast Hackamore Championship. He died in 1960.

== Death and honors ==
Driftwood died in 1960 and in 2006 he was inducted into the AQHA Hall of Fame. In 2007 Western Horseman magazine chose Driftwood as number five on their list of top ten ranch horse bloodlines.

== Pedigree ==
Unknown
Unknown
Unknown
Hobart Horse
Unknown
Unknown
Unknown
Miller Boy
Traveler 1885 Chestnut
Texas Chief 1905 Chestnut
Yellow Boy
Wylie
JA Mare
JA Mare
Whalebone 1868 Chestnut
Driftwood
Mittie Stephens 1869 Chestnut
Lock's Rondo 1880 Chestnut
Unknown
Barlow 1
Unknown
Kentucky TB Mare
Unknown
The Comer Mare
Unknown
Unknown
Unknown
TB Mare
Unknown
Unknown
