= Country Classic =

Quarter Horse show horse

- Breed: Quarter Horse
- Discipline: Showing
- Sire: Rey Jay
- Grandsire: Rey Del Rancho
- Dam: Christy Carol
- Maternal grandsire: Leo Bob
- Sex: Gelding
- Foaled: 1969
- Country: United States
- Color: Chestnut
- Breeder: Marion Flynt
- Owner: Linda Marie Mills, Stacey Allyn Strain, Randall Clark Strain

Other awards
- 1977 AQHA High Point Youth Working Cowhorse

Honors
- American Quarter Horse Hall of Fame
- Last updated on: January 11, 2008.

Country Classic was a Quarter Horse gelding that competed and won in halter, showmanship, cutting, working cowhorse, barrel racing, stake race, hunt seat equitation, pole bending, hunter under saddle, trail, western pleasure, horsemanship, roping – both heading and heeling, and western riding. He won 98 all-around titles, a reserve world championship in stake race, six open and youth AQHA Superiors awards, and placed 15 times in the AQAH Youth World Show Top Ten. He died in April 1986.

Country Classic was inducted into the AQHA Hall of Fame in 2001.
