= Cherry Lake (horse) =

20th-century American Thoroughbred racehorse and broodmare

- Sire: Lake Erie
- Grandsire: War Admiral
- Dam: Cherao
- Damsire: Nechao
- Sex: Mare
- Foaled: 1966
- Country: United States
- Colour: Chestnut

Honours
- American Quarter Horse Hall of Fame
- Last updated on June 30, 2007

A registered Thoroughbred, Cherry Lake raced mostly on the Quarter Horse racetracks and made her mark on the Quarter Horse breed as a broodmare. She was posthumously inducted into the American Quarter Horse Hall of Fame.

== Background ==
Cherry Lake was a registered Thoroughbred mare, the daughter of Lake Erie and out of a daughter of Nechao named Cherao. Her sire was a son of the U. S. Triple Crown winner War Admiral while her dam was a granddaughter of Nearco and a great-granddaughter of Hyperion. She was a 1966 foal.

== Racing career ==
In her racing career she started both Quarter Horse and Thoroughbred races. On the quarter tracks, her record was twenty-one starts, ten wins, four seconds and two thirds in three years. She earned a Speed Index rating of 97 and was a stakes race winner. Her total quarter track earnings was $16,651.00. As a three-year-old she started nine times on the Thoroughbred tracks, with three wins and a third-place finish and earnings of $6109.00. As a four-year-old she raced twice on the Thoroughbred tracks, with one win for $935.00.

== Breeding record and honors ==
Among her foals were Cash Rate, Flow of Cash, Six Popper and Counting The Cash. Six Popper won the All American Derby in 1986 and Cash Rate was the 1985 World Champion Quarter Running Horse. Cherry Lake died July 1, 1993.

She was inducted into the American Quarter Horse Association's (or AQHA) AQHA Hall of Fame in 1998.

== Pedigree ==
Fair Play
Man o' War
Mahubah
War Admiral
Sweep
Brushup
Annette K
Lake Erie
Sansovino
Jacopo
Black Ray
Sweet Tryst
Sir Gallahad III
Gentle Tryst
Cinq a Sept
Cherry Lake
Pharos
Nearco
Nogara
Nechao
Hyperion
Cassiope
Campanula
Cherao
Jack High
With Regards
Loose Foot
With Blessings
Nedayr
Endowah
Good Taste
