= Shoofly =

Shoofly and similar may refer to:

- Shoofly pie
- "Shoo Fly, Don't Bother Me", a traditional children's song.
- "Shoo-Fly Pie and Apple Pan Dowdy", a song first performed by June Christy.
- "Shoofly", a 2007 song by Moka Only from the album Vermilion
- Shoofly Comer aka Niviatsinaq, Aivilingmiut (Canadian Inuit) wife of American whaling captain George Comer
- Shue Fly, a Quarter Horse racehorse during the 1940s
- Shoofly, a common name for the plant species Biancaea decapetala
- Shoo Fly (sternwheeler), a steamboat which operated on the Willamette and Columbia Rivers from 1871 to 1878.
- Shoo Fly Complex, a geological rock formation in the Sierra Nevada in California, USA
- Shoo-fly plant, Nicandra physalodes, a species of flowering plant in subfamily Solanoideae of the nightshade family
- Shoofly, a temporary short routing around a small construction site or other obstruction
  - Rail shoofly: See Glossary of North American railway terms § S
  - Road shoofly: See Bypass (road) § Shoofly
- shoofly, a type of children's rocking chair invented by Jesse Armour Crandall
