= Jackie Bee =

Quarter Horse stallion and sire

- Breed: American Quarter Horse
- Sire: Jimmy Mac Bee
- Grandsire: Sonny Day Bee
- Dam: Jackie Diane
- Maternal grandsire: Jack R
- Sex: Stallion
- Foaled: 1962
- Country: United States
- Color: Gray
- Breeder: Glen Davis
- Owner: Duane Walker

Honors
- American Quarter Horse Hall of Fame

Jackie Bee (1962–1990) was an American Quarter Horse stallion who was inducted into the American Quarter Horse Association's (or AQHA) Hall of Fame in 2008.

== Life ==
Jackie Bee was foaled in 1962 and was a gray stallion bred by Glen Davis. He sired 1009 foals in his breeding career, including seven AQHA Champions. He died in October 1990.

== Pedigree ==
Waggoner's Rainy Day P-13
Stormy Day Moore
Papoose Bess
Sonny Day Bee
Bert Benear
Leone C
Wa-Gos-She
Jimmy Mac Bee
Little Tom B
Hackberry Red
Susie Joe
Miss Hackberry
Matador Ranch horse
Miss Amber
Matador Ranch mare
Jackie Bee
Captain White Socks
Jimmy King
Manosa
Jack R
Brownie Red
Adell
Ray
Jackie Diane
Midnight
Waggoner
mare by Yellow Wolf
My Jackie Waggoner
Charley McCue
Jackie McCue D
Jacky D (TB)
