= Clabber (horse) =

American Quarter Horse racehorse

- Breed: Quarter Horse
- Discipline: Racing; Rodeo
- Sire: My Texas Dandy
- Grandsire: imported Porte Drapeau (TB)
- Dam: Blondie S
- Maternal grandsire: Lone Star
- Sex: Stallion
- Foaled: 1936
- Country: United States
- Color: Sorrel
- Breeder: Frank Smith
- Owner: A. A. Nichols, Frank Vessels

Awards
- 1941 World Champion Quarter Running Horse

Honors
- American Quarter Horse Hall of Fame

Clabber (1936–1947) was a Quarter Horse stallion known as the Iron Horse for his ability to run and win match races after a day of ranch work.

== Life ==
Clabber was registered as number 507 with the American Quarter Horse Association (or AQHA). Foaled in 1936, he was sorrel in color. His registration listing gives his sire as My Texas Dandy #4900 by *Porte Drapeau (TB). His first dam was Blondie S by Lone Star by Gold Enamel (TB). The second dam, or maternal granddam, was given as Emory Goldman by Capt. Joe. He was recorded as having been bred by Frank Smith of Big Foot, Texas. A. A. Nichols of Gilbert, Arizona registered him with the AQHA. He traced twice to Traveler on his dam's side. Sometimes his dam is given as a daughter of Uncle Jimmie Gray (TB) named Golden Girl or Golden Wheel, but the AQHA considers his dam to be Blondie S. Nichols said that as a yearling, the colt had such big feet that his friends teased him and said that the horse's feet looked like clapboards, thus the horse's name. Certainly, Clabber was no pretty horse, and had a number of conformation faults.

== Racing career ==
Clabber's racing record is listed as "not available" in the Quarter Racing Digest but it does list that he was awarded a Race Register of Merit and was named World Champion Quarter Running Horse for 1940–1941. In 1944, Clabber beat Painted Joe but in the Stallion Championship race only managed a dead heat with Bartender. Besides his racing career, he also was a ranch horse, and the ranch hands also competed on him in rodeo events, winning events at the local rodeos in team roping and calf roping. It was through Clabber's ability to be a ranch horse all week, run races on the weekend and maybe compete in a rodeo that he earned his nickname of "The Iron Horse."

== Breeding record ==
Frank Vessels Jr of Los Alamitos, California bought Clabber from Nichols in October 1944 for $5000. Vessels only got two foal crops before Clabber died. Vessels said of him "Although most of his offspring had many of his conformational defects, they also had much of his ability, desire to run, and general intelligence."

Among Clabber's foremost offspring were Chester C, Buster, Jeep, Flicka, Wagon N, Peggy N, and Tonta Gal. His leading money earner on the track was Clabbertown G, a 1946 sorrel stallion who earned $16,130.00. Twenty-six of his offspring earned Race Register of Merits. He died of a head injury on January 1, 1947, in California.

Clabber was inducted into the AQHA Hall of Fame in 1997.

== Pedigree ==
Pedigree of Clabber (USA), Sorrel stallion, 1936
Sire My Texas Dandy 1928	Porte Drapeau (TB); 1915	Sunstar (TB)	Sundridge (TB)
Sire My Texas Dandy 1928	Porte Drapeau (TB); 1915	Sunstar (TB)	Doris (TB)
Sire My Texas Dandy 1928	Porte Drapeau (TB); 1915	Bright Cherry (TB)	Ayshire (TB)
Sire My Texas Dandy 1928	Porte Drapeau (TB); 1915	Bright Cherry (TB)	Cerisette (TB)
Sire My Texas Dandy 1928	Sadie M 1924	Little Dick	Sleepy Dick
Sire My Texas Dandy 1928	Sadie M 1924	Little Dick	Flora
Sire My Texas Dandy 1928	Sadie M 1924	Nellie	Panmure (TB)
Sire My Texas Dandy 1928	Sadie M 1924	Nellie	unknown
Dam Blondie S	Lone Star; 1911	Gold Enamel (TB)	Maddison (TB)
Dam Blondie S	Lone Star; 1911	Gold Enamel (TB)	Enamel (TB)
Dam Blondie S	Lone Star; 1911	unknown	unknown
Dam Blondie S	Lone Star; 1911	unknown	unknown
Dam Blondie S	Emory Goldman	Captain Joe	Traveler
Dam Blondie S	Emory Goldman	Captain Joe	Mamie Crowder
Dam Blondie S	Emory Goldman	Possum (King) mare	Possum (King)
Dam Blondie S	Emory Goldman	Possum (King) mare	unknown
