= King (horse) =

Quarter Horse stallion and sire

King P-234
- Breed: Quarter Horse
- Sire: Zantanon
- Grandsire: Traveler
- Dam: Jabalina
- Maternal grandsire: Strait Horse
- Sex: Stallion
- Foaled: 1932
- Country: United States
- Color: Bay
- Breeder: M. Benavides Volpe
- Owner: Charles Alexander; Byrne James; Win DuBose; Jess Hankins

Honors
- American Quarter Horse Hall of Fame

King (1932–1958), often known as King P-234, was an outstanding early Quarter Horse stallion who influenced the breed throughout the early years of the American Quarter Horse Association (or AQHA).

== Life ==
King was born June 25, 1932, the offspring of Zantanon and Jabalina. Originally named Buttons by his breeder, he was renamed King when he was registered with the AQHA as number 234. He was a bay stallion, bred by Manuel Benavides Volpe of Laredo, Texas, and owned at the time of registration by Jess L. Hankins of Rocksprings, Texas. The AQHA gave his sire as Zantanon by Little Joe by Traveler and his dam as Jabalina by Strait Horse by Yellow Jacket by Little Rondo (Bunton Horse). His second dam was a mare by Traveler, making him linebred to Traveler.

== Career ==
Volpe sold Buttons/King to Charles Alexander of Laredo as a weanling for $150. Later, Byrne James of Encinal, Texas, bought King from Alexander for $325. It was James' wife that changed the horse's name from Buttons to King. James broke King and used him for roping and other ranch work, but when James joined the New York Giants organization to play baseball, King was sold to Win DuBose of Uvalde, Texas, for $550. However, eventually DuBose sold King to Jess Hankins of Rocksprings, Texas, on July 5, 1937, for the sum of $800.

== Breeding record ==
King was the sire of many famous Quarter Horses including Brown King H, Martha King, Royal King, King's Pistol, Gay Widow, Black Gold King, Power Command, Poco Bueno, Continental King, and LH Quarter Moon. Two of his sons were inducted into the AQHA Hall of Fame, those being Poco Bueno and Royal King. His daughter Taboo was the dam of Joe Cody, another member of the AQHA Hall of Fame.

== Death and honors ==
King died on March 24, 1958, of heart failure.

King was inducted into the AQHA Hall of Fame in 1989.

== Pedigree ==
unknown
Traveler
unknown
Little Joe
Sykes' Rondo
Jenny
May Mangum
Zantanon
Big Jim by Sykes' Rondo
Billy
unknown
Jeanette
Sykes' Rondo
mare by Sykes' Rondo
unknown
King P-234
Little Rondo by Lock's Rondo
Yellow Jacket
Barbee Dun by Lock's Rondo
Strait Horse
unknown
Gardner quarter mare
unknown
Jabalina
unknown
Traveler
unknown
mare by Traveler
unknown

== See also ==
- List of historical horses
