= Beduino =

Thoroughbred stallion and racehorse

- Sire: Romany Royal
- Grandsire: Grey Sovereign
- Dam: Jo-Ann-Cat
- Damsire: Rejected
- Sex: Stallion
- Foaled: 1968
- Country: Mexico
- Colour: Gray
- Breeder: Justo F Fernandez
- Record: 13-6-2
- Earnings: $13,630

Major wins
- Second in the 1971 Clasico Windsor Stakes (in Mexico)

Honours
- American Quarter Horse Hall of Fame
- Last updated on March 3, 2008

Beduino (1968–1991) was a registered Thoroughbred stallion, who was a famous sire of Quarter Horses.

== Life ==
Bred by Justo F Fernandez in Mexico, Beduino foaled in 1968 and was a gray son of Romany Royal. His dam was a daughter of Rejected named Jo-Ann-Cat. His second dam was a daughter of Depth Charge (TB). Beduino raced for three years on the racetracks in Mexico, from 1970 to 1972. He placed second in the 1971 Clasico Windsor Stakes.

Beduino died in May 1991, having been euthanized due to old age. He was inducted into the American Quarter Horse Association's (or AQHA) American Quarter Horse Hall of Fame in 2008.

== Pedigree ==
Nearco
Nasrullah
Mumtaz Begum
Grey Sovereign
Baytown
Kong
Clang
Romany Royal
Gold Bridge
Vilmorin
Queen of the Meadows
Romany Belle
Charger
Romany Chi
Romany Lass
Beduino
Blue Larkspur
Revoked
Gala Belle
Rejected
Blenheim
By Line
Sable Scarf
Jo-Ann-Cat
Bold Venture
Depth Charge
Quickly
Quick Eye
*Teddy
Eye To Eye
Appeal
