= Cherry Lake (disambiguation) =

Cherry Lake is an artificial lake in the Stanislaus National Forest of Tuolumne County, California, United States.

Cherry Lake may also refer to:

- Cherry Lake (horse) (foaled 1966), an American Thoroughbred
- Cherry Lake (Victoria), wetlands converted to a lake in Altona, Melbourne, Australia
- Cherry Lake (South Dakota), a lake in the U.S.
- Cherry Lake, Florida, a place in the U.S.
