= Evening Snow =

American Quarter Horse racehorse

Evening Snow was an American Quarter Horse bred by Ginger Hyland and was purchased in foal with his mother Florentine by AQHA Hall of Fame Inductee Princess Abigail Kawananakoa. Foaled in 1993, he was sired by Chicks Beduino and was out of the Champion mare Florentine. In 1995, he won the first Los Alamitos Million Futurity. In 1996, he became the first horse of any breed to run 1/4 mile (0.40 km) from a standing start and a closed gate in under 21 seconds, finishing with 20.94 and setting a new world record. This earned him a speed index of 128.
