= Expensive Hobby =

Quarter Horse showhorse

- Breed: Quarter Horse
- Discipline: Showing
- Sire: Hobby Horse
- Grandsire: Tinky Poo
- Dam: Jan's Helen
- Maternal grandsire: Stormy's Sugar
- Sex: Gelding
- Foaled: 1971
- Country: United States
- Color: Buckskin
- Owner: Mehl Lawson, Georganna Stewart

Other awards
- 1976 AQHA World Champion Senior Working Cowhorse; 1979 AQHA World Champion Senior Reining Horse; 1979 AQHA World Champion Senior Working Cowhorse; AQHA Superior Cutting Horse

Honors
- American Quarter Horse Hall of Fame

Expensive Hobby (1971–2003) was an outstanding Quarter Horse reining horse, working cowhorse, and cutting horse.

Expensive Hobby was a 1971 buckskin gelding, sired by Hobby Horse, and out of a daughter of Stormy's Sugar named Jan's Helen.

Expensive Hobby was shown in reining 120 times, and won the class 110 of those times. He won the American Quarter Horse Association, or AQHA, World Show Champion title in working cowhorse and reining in 1979. He was retired in 1983, but came out of retirement briefly, but was eventually retired again, before dying at age 32 in 2003.

Expensive Hobby was inducted into the American Quarter Horse Association's (or AQHA) AQHA Hall of Fame in 2007.
