= Do Good =

Quarter Horse broodmare

- Breed: Quarter Horse
- Discipline: Racing
- Sire: St Louis
- Grandsire: Eck Davis (TB)
- Dam: Flossie
- Maternal grandsire: Duggan
- Sex: Mare
- Foaled: 1938
- Country: United States
- Color: Brown
- Breeder: Jim Harkey
- Owner: Frank Vessels Sr.

Record
- unraced

Earnings
- unraced

Honors
- American Quarter Horse Hall of Fame

Do Good (1938–1960) was a Quarter Horse mare who was noted for being an outstanding broodmare of race horses. She was inducted into the American Quarter Horse Association's (or AQHA) Hall of Fame in 2008.

== Life ==
Do Good was bred by Jim Harkey of Carlsbad, New Mexico and was foaled in 1938. She was bought by Frank Vessels Sr. in 1945, and was never raced or shown. She produced 13 foals in her lifetime.

== Pedigree ==
*Kilkerrun (TB)
Eck Davis (TB)
Miss Ross (TB)
St Louis
Dewey (TB)
Old Flossie
mare by Old DJ
Do Good
Baby
Duggan
Dewey (TB)
Old Flossie
Flossie
Peter McCue
Harmon Baker
Old Floridene
Little Dutch
