= American Quarter Horse Hall of Fame =

Hall of Fame for Quarter Horses and people connected to the Quarter Horse

Coordinates: 35.194327°N 101.807771°W

The American Quarter Horse Hall of Fame and Museum was created by the American Quarter Horse Association (AQHA), based in Amarillo, Texas. Ground breaking construction of the Hall of Fame Museum began in 1989. The distinction is earned by people and horses who have contributed to the growth of the American Quarter Horse and "have been outstanding over a period of years in a variety of categories". In 1982, Bob Denhardt and Ernest Browning were the first individuals to receive the honor of being inducted into the AQHA Hall of Fame. In 1989, Wimpy P-1, King P-234, Leo and Three Bars were the first horses inducted into the AQHA Hall of Fame.

== Museum ==
The American Quarter Horse Hall of Fame & Museum features photographs of honorees and paintings of American Quarter Horses famous in the bloodlines of current champions. Many of the paintings are by the western artist Orren Mixer. There are interactive exhibits about horse anatomy, horse riding and disciplines of the American Quarter Horse. Other displays include artifacts, riding and cowboy attire, tack, photos and ribbons and memorabilia about inductees.

== Hall of Fame nominations ==
To be considered by the Hall of Fame, anyone may nominate either people or horses to be considered. Nominations from the membership are due by November 1. They are then screened and sent to the Hall of Fame committee which meets in the following March. Nominations stay active for three years, then must sit out for three years before being considered again. People being considered may be alive or deceased, but horses must be deceased.

== Horses ==
List of horses currently inducted in the American Quarter Horse Association's Hall of Fame:

Name of horse	Year inducted	Year foaled	Year died	Color	Sex	Sire	Dam	Broodmare sire	Breeder	Discipline
A Good Machine	2020	1993	2011	Bay	Stallion	Zippos Mr Good Bar	War Kelpie	War Machine	Dawn Schroeter	Western Pleasure, Breeding stallion
Azure Te (TB)	2015	1962	1983	Bay	Stallion	Nashville TB	Blue One TB	Count Fleet TB	Azure Te Syndication	Breeding stallion
Barbara L	2007	1947	1977	Bay	Mare	Patriotic (TB)	Big Bess	Sonora Harmon	James T. Hunt	Racing
Blondy's Dude	2001	1957	1980	Sorrel	Stallion	Small Town Dude	Blondy Queen	Blondy Plaudit	Homer S. Foutz	Halter
Baby Doll Combs (Baby Doll)	2004	1947	1960	Bay	Mare	Oklahoma Star Jr	Miss Boctick	Bert	H. M. Boctick	Rodeo steer westling
Beduino (TB)	2008	1968	1991	Gray	Stallion	Romany Royal (TB)	Jo-Ann-Cat (TB)	Rejected (TB)	Justo Fernandez Avila	Racing
Bert	2007	1934	1956	Brown	Stallion	Tommy Clegg	Lady Coolidge	Beech's Yellow Jacket	Bert Benear	Breeding stallion
Big Step	2022	1956		Sorrel	Stallion					Breeding stallion
Billy Clegg	1998	1932	1958	Bay	Stallion	Paul Ell	Bivarita	Billy Sunday	Bernard Adams	Breeding stallion
Black Easter Bunny	2002	1949		Black	Mare	Hysition (TB)	Flicka	Chicaro Bill	Walter J. Culbertson	Racing
Casey's Ladylove	2017	1961	1985	Buckskin	Mare	Casey's Poco	Lady Diane	MC Rusty	James and Frances Loiseau	Broodmare
Charger Bar	2001	1968	1997	Bay	Mare	Tiny Charger	La Ree Bar	Rocket Bar (TB)	Wayne Carlton	Racing
Cherry Lake (TB)	1998	1966	1993	Chestnut	Mare	Lake Erie (TB)	Cherao (TB)	Nechao (TB)	Minnie Rhea Wood & B.F. Phillips	Racing
Chicado V	2006	1950	1972	Brown	Mare	Chicaro Bill	Do Good	St. Louis	Frank Vessels	Racing
Chicks Beduino	2007	1984	2003	Gray	Stallion	Beduino (TB)	A Classy Chick	Chick's Deck	Joe Muniz; John Bobenrieth	Racing
Clabber	1997	1936	1947	Sorrel	Stallion	My Texas Dandy	Blondie S	Lone Star	Frank Smith	Racing
Colonel Freckles	2004	1973	1986	Sorrel	Stallion	Jewel's Leo Bars	Christy Jay	Rey Jay	Marrion Flynt	Cutting
Corona Cartel	2022	1994		Bay	Stallion					Racing
Corona Chick	2015		2013	Dark-brown	Mare	Chicks Beduino	Sizzling Lil	Sizzle Te	Robert D. "Strawberry Bob" Etchandy	Racing/broodmare
Country Classic	2001	1969	1986	Sorrel	Gelding	Rey Jay	Christy Carol	Leo Bob	Marion Flynt	Showing
Coy's Bonanza	2015	1959	1976	Sorrel	Stallion	Jaguar	Sparky Joann	Little Joe the Wrangler	Bill Moomey	Sire
Cutter Bill	2003	1955	1982	Palomino	Stallion	Buddy Dexter	Billie Silvertone	Silvertone	R. L. Underwood	Cutting
Dashingly	2014	1979	2006	Sorrel	Mare	Dash For Cash	Dee Mount	Killoqua (TB)	Muriel Hyland	Racing/broodmare
Dash For Cash	1997	1973	1996	Sorrel	Stallion	Rocket Wrangler	Find A Buyer (TB)	To Market (TB)	B. F. Phillips Jr.	Racing
Dashing Phoebe	2017	1983	2013	Sorrel	Mare	Dash for Cash	Phoebes Moon Bug	Lady Bugs Moon	Kirk Goodfellow	Broodmare
Depth Charge (TB)	1991	1941	1965	Brown	Stallion	Bold Venture (TB)	Quickly (TB)	Haste (TB)	John D. Hertz	Racing sire
Diamonds Sparkle	2007	1974	2002	Palomino	Mare	Mr Diamond Dude	Pollyana Rose	Clabber Question	Jerald Freeman	Showing
Do Good	2008	1938		Brown	Mare	St Louis	Flossie	Duggan	Jim Harkey	Broodmare
Doc Bar	1993	1956	1992	Chestnut	Stallion	Lightning Bar	Dandy Doll	Texas Dandy	Tom Finley	Breeding stallion
Doc O'Lena	1997	1967	1993	Bay	Stallion	Doc Bar	Poco Lena	Poco Bueno	Dr. & Mrs. Stephen F. Jensen	Halter; Cutting sire
Driftwood	2006	1932	1960	Bay	Stallion	Miller Boy	unnamed mare	Barlow	Mr. Childress	Breeding stallion
Dual Rey	2020	1994	2018	Sorrel	Stallion	Peppy San Badger	Nurse Rey	Wyoming Doc	Linda Holmes	Cutting, Breeding sire
Easter King	2022	1951		Sorrel	Stallion					Breeding stallion
Easy Date	2002	1972	1993	Bay	Mare	Easy Jet	Spot Cash (TB)	Roman Sandal (TB)	Walter Merrick	Racing
Easy Jet	1993	1967	1992	Sorrel	Stallion	Jet Deck	Lena's Bar (TB)	Three Bars (TB)	Walter Merrick	Racing
Esters Little Klu	2020	1968		Gray Thoroughbred	Mare	Big Klu	Little Ester	Eternal Reward	Dan L. Williams	Broodmare
Expensive Hobby	2007	1971	2003	Buckskin	Gelding	Hobby Horse	Jan's Helen	Stormy's Sugar	Floyd Finnerty	Showing
Fillinic	2013	1957	1983	Chestnut	Mare	Arizona Junie	Alouette	Master Boss (TB)	Grey Ward	Reining/Broodmare
Freckles Playboy	2013	1973	2003	Sorrel	Stallion	Jewels Leo Bars	Gay Jay	Rey Jay	Marion Flynt	Cutting/Breeding stallion
First Down Dash	2011	1984	2010	Sorrel	Stallion	Dash For Cash	First Prize Rose	Gallant Jet	Weetona Stanley	Breeding Stallion
FL Lady Bug	1999	1945	1974	Sorrel	Mare	Sergeant	Yeager's Lady JA	Will Stead	W. A. Yeager	Broodmare
Garrett's Miss Pawhuska	2006	1946	1975	Sorrel	Mare	Leo	Jenny Dee	Jimmie Allred	Bill Rowe	Racing
Go Man Go	1990	1953	1983	Roan	Stallion	Top Deck (TB)	Lightfoot Sis	Very Wise (TB)	J. B. Ferguson	Racing
Goetta	2007	1961	1978	Bay	Mare	Go Man Go	Etta Leo	Leo	E. L. Gosselin	Racing
Grey Badger II	2007	1941	c. 1972	Gray	Stallion	Midnight Jr	Grey Annie	Billy The Tough	Walter Merrick	Racing
Harlan	2019	1951	1973	Buckskin	Stallion	Hank H	Dixie Beach	Beetch's Yellowjacket	Paul and Jack Smith	Breeding stallion
Hollywood Dun It	2012	1983	2005	Dun	Stallion	Hollywood Jac 86	Blossom Berry	Dun Berry	Cliff and Gwendy Steif	Breeding stallion
Impressive	2022	1969		Sorrel	Stallion					Halter/Breeding stallion
Indigo Illusion	2012	1981	2007	Brown	Mare	Beduino (TB)	Copy Carpi	Duplicate Copy	William Carter and Allen Baitzor	Broodmare
Jackie Bee	2008	1962	1990	Gray	Stallion	Jimmy Mac Bee	Jackie Diane	Jack R	Glen Davis	Breeding stallion
Jet Deck	1991	1960	1971	Bay	Stallion	Moon Deck	Miss Night Bar	Barred	William and James Carter	Racing
Joe Cody	1995	1952	1989	Sorrel	Stallion	Bill Cody	Taboo	King P-234	Tom W. Cochrane	Reining
Joe Hancock P-455	1992	c1926	1943	Brown	Stallion	John Wilkens	Mundell Mare	Percheron stud	John Jackson Hancock	Racing
Joe Reed P-3	1992	1921	1947	Chestnut	Stallion	Joe Blair (TB)	Della Moore	Old DJ	Henry Lindsey	Racing
Joe Reed II	1994	1936	1964	Chestnut	Stallion	Joe Reed P-3	Nellene	Fleeting Time (TB)	J. W. House	Racing
Kaweah Bar	1998	1966	1976	Palomino	Gelding	Alamitos Bar	Angie Miss	Go Man Go	Hadan Livestock Company	Racing
King P-234	1989	1932	1958	Bay	Stallion	Zantanon	Jabalina	Strait Horse	M. Benevides Volpe	Breeding stallion
Lady Bug's Moon	2013	1966	1995	Sorrel	Stallion	Top Moon	FL Lady Bug	Sergeant		Racing/Breeding stallion
Lena's Bar (TB)	2003	1954	1967	Chestnut	Mare	Three Bars (TB)	Lena Valenti (TB)	Gray Dream (TB)	Walter Merrick	Racing/broodmare
Leo San	2014	1949	1968	Sorrel	Stallion	Leo	San Sue Darks	San Siemon	H.H. Darks	Breeding stallion
Leo P-1335	1989	1940	1967	Sorrel	Stallion	Joe Reed II	Little Fanny	Joe Reed P-3	J. W. House	Racing
Lightning Bar	2008	1951	1960	Sorrel	Stallion	Three Bars (TB)	Della P	Doc Horn (TB)	Art Pollard	Showing
Lynx Melody	2008	1975	2004	Sorrel	Mare	Doc's Lynx	Trona	Leon Bars	James A. Wesley	Cutting
Maddon's Bright Eyes	1997	1946	1958	Bay	Mare	Gold Mount	Plaudette	King Plaudit (TB)	J. W. Shoemaker	Racing
Majestic Scotch	2017	1994	2013	Sorrel	Gelding	One Scotch Delight	Two Eyed Natches	Two Eyed Punk	Sharnai Thompson	Showing
Make It Do (Peanuts)	2009	1964	1995	sorrel	Gelding	Breeze Bar	Camelot Broom	Camelot's Little Cuero	Judd L. Morse	Rodeo
Maroon (TB)	2018	1949	1977		Mare	Echuca Ladd	Mattie Fern	Sunfire	Mary Pearson	Racing/Reining
Miss Jim 45	2000	1966	1978	Red Dun	Mare	Jim Harlan	Miss Paulo 45	Paulos Dandy	James Nance	Showing
Miss Meyers	2009	1949	1963	sorrel	Mare	Leo	Star's Lou	Oklahoma Star	O.C. Meyers	Racing
Miss Olene	2013	1957		Bay	Mare	Leo	Barbara L	Patriotic (TB)		Racing/Broodmare
Miss T Stuart	2014	1961	1991	Dun	Mare	Breezy Buck	Pretty Sally	Big Shot Dun	Robert T. Stuart	Broodmare/Producer
Moon Deck	1996	1950	1974	Brown	Stallion	Top Deck (TB)	Moonlight Night	Peace Pipe (TB)	J. B. Ferguson	Racing
Mr Bar None	2014	1955	1982	Sorrel	Stallion	Three Bars (TB)	Murl L	Moco Burnett	Oscar and Zelma Jeffers	Racing/Stallion
Mr Conclusion	2014	1982	1998	Sorrel	Stallion	Conclusive	Miss Amber Charge	Otoe Charge	James Evans and Mark Toteff	Showing/Breeding stallion
Mr Eye Opener	2020	1990	2018	Gray	Stallion	Dash for Cash	Bedawee	Beduino	Joe Kirk	Racing/Breeding Stallion
Mr Gun Smoke	2016	1961	1983	Sorrel	Stallion	Rondo Leo	Kansas Cindy	Kansas Star	Rapps Quarter Horses	Sire
Mr Jess Perry	2019	1992	2017	Sorrel	Stallion	Streakin La Jolla	Scoopie Fein	Sinn Fein	Jesse Perry	Racing/Breeding stallion
Mr San Peppy	2011	1968	1998	Sorrel	Stallion	Leo San	Peppy Belle	Pep Up	King Ranch	Cutting
Oklahoma Star P-6	1992	1915	1943	Bay	Stallion	Dennis Reed (TB)	Cutthroat	Gulliver	Tommy Moore	Stallion
Old Sorrel	1990	1915	1945	Chestnut	Stallion	Hickory Bill	Dr. Rose TB Mare	unknown	George Clegg	Breeding stallion
Otoe	2018	1960	1971	Sorrel	Stallion	Sugar Bars	Juleo	Leo	Bud Warren	Racing/Halter/Sire
Ought To Go	2003	1967		Sorrel	Mare	Go Man Go	Do Good Bam	War Bam (TB)	Frank Vessels, Jr.	Racing
Parker's Trouble	2016	1949	1975	Chestnut	Stallion	Ed Echols	Little Nellie Bars	Three Bars TB	Blain and Aneliza Lewis	Sire
Pecho Dexter	2005	1963	1984	Sorrel	Gelding	Poco Pecho	Miss Hogan	Joe Dexter	John King	Halter & Showing
Peppy San	1999	1959	1989	Sorrel	Stallion	Leo San	Peppy Belle	Pep Up	Gordon Howell	Cutting
Peppy San Badger	2008	1974	2005	Sorrel	Stallion	Mr San Peppy	Sugar Badger	Grey Badger III	Joe Kirk Fulton	Cutting
Peter McCue	1991	1895	1923	Bay	Stallion	Dan Tucker	Nora M (TB)	Voltigeur (TB)	Sam Watkins	Breeding stallion
Plaudit	2015	1930	1958	Palomino	Stallion	King Plaudit TB	Colorado Queen	Old Nick	Leon Harms	Sire
Poco Bueno P-3044	1990	1944	1969	Brown	Stallion	King P-234	Miss Taylor	Old Poco Bueno	Jess Hankins	Cutting
Poco Lena	1991	1949	1968	Bay	Mare	Poco Bueno	Sheilwin	Pretty Boy	E. Paul Waggoner	Cutting
Poco Pine	2010	1954	1974	Bay	Stallion	Poco Bueno	Pretty Rosalie	Pretty Boy	E. Paul Waggoner	Showing, Breeding stallion
Poco Tivio	2013	1947	1976	Brown	Stallion	Poco Bueno	Sheilwin	Pretty Boy	E. Paul Waggoner	Cutting/Breeding stallion
Quo Vadis	2002	1952	1979	Black	Mare	Little Lloyd	Miss Circle H III	Brown Caesar	Ross Roberts	Showing
Royal Santana	2000	1977	1995	Sorrel	Gelding	Peppy San	Royal Smart	Royal King	C.N. Woodward	Cutting
Refrigerator	2000	1988	1999	Bay	Gelding	Rare Jet	Native Parr	Heisanative	Sonny Vaughn	Racing
Rocket Bar (TB)	1992	1951	1970	Chestnut	Stallion	Three Bars (TB)	Golden Rocket (TB)	Cartago (TB)	Charles H. Reed	Racing
Rocket Wrangler	2010	1968	1992	Sorrel	Stallion	Rocket Bar (TB)	Go Galla Go	Go Man Go	Thayer Hobson	Racing, Breeding stallion
Ronas Ryon	2004	1984	2000		Stallion	Windy Ryon	Rona Bar	Three Bargains	James Floyd Plummer	Racing
Royal King	1997	1943	1974	Sorrel	Stallion	King P-234	Rocket Laning	Dolph	Felton Smathers	Cutting
Rugged Lark	2006	1981	2004	Bay	Stallion	Really Rugged (TB)	Alisa Lark	Leolark	Teresa Striegel	Showing
Runaway Winner	2018	1985	2015	Gray	Stallion	Bediuno (TB)	Miss Fast	Fast Jet	Chris Cox	Racing/Sire
Scotch Bar Time	2009	1974	2004	Chestnut	Stallion	Sonny Dee Bar	Chubby Time	Spot Time	Doug Hobbs	Breeding stallion
Shue Fly	2005	1937	1963	Chestnut	Mare	Cowboy P-12	Lady Luck	Booger Red	Lloyd Miller	Racing
Skipper W	2011	1945	1963	Sorrel	Stallion	Nick Shoemaker	Hired Girl	Cowboy P-12	Hank Wiescamp	Breeding Stallion
Smart Chic Olena	2018	1985	2012	Sorrel	Stallion	Smart Little Lena	Gay Sugar Chic	Gay Bar King	B.F. Phillips	Cutting/Reining
Smart Little Lena	2015	1979	2010	Sorrel	Stallion	Doc O Lena	Smart Peppy	Peppy San	Syndication	Cutting
Sonny Dee Bar	2003	1965	1994	Sorrel	Stallion	Win Or Lose	Chigger's Baby	Chigger	E. V. Roberts	Halter
Special Effort	2008	1979	2006	Sorrel	Stallion	Raise Your Glass (TB)	Go Effortlessly	Double Devil	Allen and Jeanette Moehrig	Racing
Strawfly Special	2017	1987	2004	Brown	Stallion	Special Effort	Fly In The Pie	Pie In The Sky	Double Bar S Ranch	Sire
Streakin La Jolla	2012	1985	2009	Sorrel	Stallion	Streakin Six	Bottoms Up	Raise Your Glass (TB)	B.F. Phillips Jr. and Delbert Smith	Breeding Stallion
Streakin Six	2011	1977	2005	Sorrel	Stallion	Easy Six	Miss Assured	Little Request (TB)	Tom L. Burnett	Breeding Stallion
Sugar Bars	1994	1951	1972	Sorrel	Stallion	Three Bars (TB)	Frontera Sugar	Rey	George Wood	Breeding stallion
Sun Frost	2022	1979		Palomino	Stallion					Breeding stallion
Texas Dandy	1995	1942	1970	Sorrel	Stallion	My Texas Dandy	Streak	Lone Star	R. C. Tatum	Racing
The Invester	2004	1969	2002	Sorrel	Stallion	Zippo Pat Bars	Hank's Peppy Lou	Dinky Reed	Eldon England	Halter
The Ole Man	2018	1963	1995	Sorrel	Stallion	Three Bars (TB)	Chicado V	Chicaro Bill	Frank Vessels Sr.	Racing/Sire
Three Bars (TB)	1989	1940	1968	Chestnut	Stallion	Percentage (TB)	Myrtle Dee (TB)	Luke McLuke (TB)	James Parrish	Racing
Triple's Image	2020	1969	1999	Sorrel	Stallion	Triple Chick	Phffft	Leo	Walter Clark	Showing/Breeding Stallion
Tiger Leo	2019	1958	1988	Sorrel	Stallion	Leo	Connie	Reno Lion	Bud Warren	Racing/Show/Breeding
Top Deck (TB)	1990	1945	1965	Brown	Stallion	Equestrian (TB)	River Boat (TB)	Chicaro (TB)	King Ranch	Breeding stallion
Top Moon	1999	1960	1984	Black	Stallion	Moon Deck	Rica Bar	Barred	James V. A. Carter	Racing
Topsail Whiz	2022	1987		Chestnut	Stallion					Reining
Town Policy	1998	1975	1984	Bay	Gelding	Reb's Policy	Camptown Girl	Breeze Bar	Ivan Ashment	Racing
Traveler	1994	c1885	1912	Roan	Stallion	unknown	unknown	unknown	unknown	Racing
Trippy Dip	2019	1976	1999	Thoroughbred Maresto	Mare	Scout Leader	Dancing Straw	Dancing Dervish	S.F. Henderson	Racing/Broodmare
Two Eyed Jack	1996	1961	1991	Sorrel	Stallion	Two D Two	Triangle Tookie	Grey Badger III	Herman H. Mass	Showing
Van Decka	2016	1967	1988	Bay	Gelding	Decka Center	Vanessa Dee	Vandy	Tara Green	Showing
Vandy's Flash	2016	1954	1984	Sorrel	Gelding	Vandy	Garrett's Miss Pawhuska	Leo	Parke McAvoy	Racing
Vital Signs Are Good	2019	2000	2017	Roan	Mare	Zippos Mr Good Bar	Vitalism	An Awesome Mister	Kristin T. Rinkenberger	Show/Broodmare
Wimpy P-1	1989	1937	1959	Sorrel	Stallion	Solis	Panda	Old Sorrel	King Ranch	Breeding stallion
Woven Web (TB)	2016	1943	1966	Chestnut	Mare	Bold Venture TB	Bruja TB	Livery TB	King Ranch	Racing
Zan Parr Bar	2010	1974	1987	Chestnut	Stallion	Par Three	Terry's Pal	Poco Astro	Bobbie Tatum	Showing, Breeding stallion, Rodeo
Zan Parr Jack	2020	1979	2014	Sorrel	Stallion	Zan Parr Bar	Miss Goldie Jack	Two Eyed Jack	Jerald A. Riemann	Working cow horse/Breeding Stallion
Zantanon	2016	1917	1941	Chestnut	Stallion	Little Joe	Jeanette	Billy	Manuel Benavides Volpe	Sire
Zippo Pat Bars	2002	1964	1988	Sorrel	Stallion	Three Bars (TB)	Leo Pat	Leo	Paul Curtner	Showing
Zippo Pine Bar	2000	1969	1998	Sorrel	Stallion	Zippo Pat Bars	Dollie Pine	Poco Pine	Lloyd Geweke	Showing
Zippos Mr Good Bar	2019	1984	2016	Roan	Stallion	Zippo Pine Bar	Tamara Wess	Blondy's Dude	Norman Reynolds	Showing/Breeding stallion
Zips Chocolate Chip	2017	1985	2015	Bay	Stallion	Zippo Pine Bar	Fancy Blue Chip	Custus Jaguar	Ann Myers	Sire

== People ==
This list is incomplete.

Name	Discipline	Year inducted
Robert W. Moore	Racing	2003
Zack T. Wood	Cutting	2003
Evertt Salley	Showing	2003
Bill Hedge	Racing / Showing	2003
Richard Bingham	Showing	2003
Allred Brothers	Racing	2005
Ginger Hyland	Breeding	2005
Mike Perkins	Judging / Showing	2005
Charley Smith	Jockey	2005
Bert Wood	Breeder / Racing	2004
E. F. "Bud" Alderson	Showing	2004
Don Burt	Judging	2004
Rob Brown	Rancher	2004
Buster Welch	Trainer	2004
Mildred Janowitz	Breeder	2004
Jack Brooks	Racing	2004
Sparks Rust Jr.	Judging	2001
Matlock Rose	Trainer	2001
C. T. Fuller	Breeder	2001
Blane Schvaneveldt	Racing	2001
D. Wayne Lukas	Racing	2007
Anne Marion	Rancher	2007
J. D. Blondin	Showing	2007
Bill Collins	Training	2007
J. Marvin Willhite	Breeder	2007
Clarence Scharbauer, Jr.	Breeder	1992
Tom Finley	Breeder	1992
Richard M. Kleberg Jr.	Rancher	1995
Hugh Peltz	Rancher	1995
Bill Reed	Rancher	1995
Mrs. Fisher E. Simmons	Racing	1995
William R. "Bill" Thompson	Rancher	1995
Albert C. Becker	Showing	1995
Jack Anderson	Past president	1996
Marten Clark	Past president	1996
Hugh Huntley	Racing	1996
Robert Norris	Breeder	1996
David Perkins	Past president	1996
Edward "Geech" Partin	Breeder	1996
Howard Pitzer	Breeder	1996
Lee Berwick	Racing	1994
Quinby Demmitt	Breeder	1994
Robert Kieckhefer	Past president	1994
Jay Pumphrey	Past president	1994
William Verdugo	Past president	1994
Wayne Vickers	Breeder	1994
Hank Wiescamp	Breeder	1994
Ken Fratis	Breeder	1993
Robert E. Hooper	Past president	1993
Walter Merrick	Breeder	1993
Orren Mixer	Painter	1993
S. M. Moore	Breeder	1993
Roy Parks	Breeder	1993
Ike Hamilton	Auctioneer	1999
Loyd Jenkins	Breeder	1999
Suzanne Jones	Judging	1999
Jack Kyle	Breeder	1999
Leo Winters	Past president	1999
Jess Hankins	Breeder	1989
B. F. Phillips Jr	Breeder	1989
Bud Warren	Breeder	1989
Merle Wood	Breeder/Judge	1998
Robert "Bobby" Adair	Jockey	1998
George Tyler	Judging	1998
Gerald O'Connor	Past president	1998
Louis Pearce Jr	Breeder	1998
Jimmie Randals	Breeder	1998
Ott Adams	Breeder	1986
William Anson	Breeder	1986
Ivan Ashment	Racing	1987
James "Jim" Barton	Past president	2002
Dr. Marvin G. Beeman	Judging	2000
Hugh Bennett	Breeder	1990
Dick Bingham	Past president	2003
Samuel Coke Blake	Breeder	1986
M. O. "Bud" Breeding	Breeder	2002
R. A. "Rob" Brown, Jr.	Breeder	2004
R. A. Brown, Sr.	Breeder	1988
J. Ernest Browning	Founding member	1982
Orville Burtis	Inspector	1988
Danny Cardoza	Jockey	2002
Dan Casement	Breeder	1986
Spencer Childers	Racing	2002
George Clegg	Breeder	1986
Buster Cole	Breeder	2002
Si Dawson	Breeder	1987
Robert Denhardt	Historian	1986
Don Dodge	Trainer	1997
C. W. "Bill" Englund	Past president	2002
A. H. "Bud" Ferber	Breeder	1994
J. B. Ferguson	Founding member	1990
Lester Goodson	Breeder	1991
J. Goodwin Hall	Founding member	1985
Carol Harris	Breeder	1997
Melville Haskell	Breeder	1984
Waldo Haythorn	Breeder	2002
Elmer Hepler	Breeder	1991
Ed Honnen	Breeder	1990
Harold "Huddy" Hudspeth	Judge/Trainer	2000
J. F. Hutchins	Founding member	1985
Mildred Janowitz	Breeder	2004
Rick Johns	Past president	1997
Robert J. Kleberg III	Breeder	1986
Stephen "Tio" Kleberg	Breeder	1997
C. O. McKerley	Youth Programs	2000
Helen Michaelis	Breeder/Historian	1985
James "Jim" Minnick	Breeder	1984
Albert Mitchell	Breeder	1984
Marshall Peavy	Breeder	1987
Harriet Peckham	Racing	2006
J. L. "Dusty" Rhoades	Breeder	1991
Coke Roberds	Breeder	1986
Gus Scroggins	Founder/Judge	1987
J. Warren Shoemaker	Breeder	1987
Kenneth T. Smith	Past president	2006
Mrs. Anne Burnett Tandy	Breeder	1990
Brad Tate	Past president	2000
Joe Turner	Racing	2006
R. L. Underwood.	Breeder	1985
Frank Vessels	Breeder/Racing	1989
E. Paul Waggoner	Breeder	1991
William B. Warren	Past president	1985
Howard Weiss	Past president	1997
Dale Wilkinson	Training	2000
Jerry Windham	Racing	2006
B. F. Yeates	Judging	2006
Duane Walker	Breeder	2008
Charley Araujo	Breeder	2008
Jim Shoemake	Past president	2008
Bubba Cascio	Racing	2008
R. C. "Punch" Jones	Breeder	2008
Clarence E. "Casey" Darnell	Breeder	2009
Charles Graham	Breeder	2009
Randall D. Hubbard	Racing	2009
Jerry Nicodemus	Jockey	2009
R.H. Steve Stevens Jr.	Past president	2009
Stretch Bradley	Showing/Training	2010
Carol Rose	Breeder	2010
Frank "Scoop" Vessels III	Breeder	2010
Douglas & Nancy Dear	Breeders	2011
Frank Howell	Showing	2011
Joe Kirk Fulton	Breeder	2011
Bob Loomis	Trainer	2012
Gordon Hannagan	Auctioneer	2012
Walter Fletcher	Past President	2012
Bill Brewer	Past President	2013
Kenny Hart	Jockey	2013
Frank Merrill	Past President	2013
Guy Ray Rutland	Breeder	2013
Greg Whalen	Breeder	2013
Leroy Webb	Trainer	2014
Ken Mumy	Past President	2014
A.B. Green	Breeder	2014
Donald "Curly" Smith	Racing	2014
Keith Babb	Auctioneer	2015
Tom Bradbury	Racing	2015
James E. Helzer	Breeder	2015
Ted Wells Jr	Breeder	2015
Johannes Orgeldinger	Past President	2016
Paul Curtner	Breeder	2016
Ben Hudson	Racing	2016
Sunny Jim Orr	Trainer	2016
Marvin Barnes	Trainer	2017
Peter J Cofrancesco III	Past President	2017
Dick Monahan	Breeder	2017
Sandra Vaughn	Judge/Breeder	2017
Gene Graves	AQHA President	2018
Abigail Kawananakoa	Breeder/Owner	2018
Dr. Tom Lenz	Veterinarian	2018
Georga & Raymond Sutton	Breeders	2018
Robert Sutherland	Breeder	2018
Billy Allen	Multiple roles	2019
Johne Dobbs	Multiple roles	2019
J.M. Frost III	Multiple roles	2019
Hans Hansma	Multiple roles	2019
Jim Jennings	Multiple roles	2019
Bob Avila		2020
C. Dwayne "Sleepy" Gilbreath	Trainer	2020
George Phillips		2020
Johnny Trotter	Past President	2020

== See also ==
- List of museums in the Texas Panhandle
- List of racehorses

== Other sources ==
- "Forever Famous" Quarter Horse Journal March 2001 p. 40-49
- "Hall of Fame Horses" Quarter Horse Journal May 1990 p. 48-49
- "Hall of Fame" Quarter Horse Journal March 2004 p. 42-53
- "Hall of Fame" Quarter Horse Journal March 2007 p. 42-55
- "Hall of Fame" Quarter Horse Journal March 2008 p. 43-55
- "MMIII" Quarter Horse Journal March 2003 p. 41-51
- "Seven Hall of Fame Inductees Honored at AQHA Convention Banquet" Quarter Horse Journal May 1989 p. 54-57
- Chamberlain, Richard; Campbell, Jim Bret "Hall of Fame" Quarter Horse Journal March 2005 p. 42-49
- Christensen, Kati "What Legends are Made of" Quarter Horse Journal March 1999 p. 40-47
- Glover, Diana "Hall of Fame Inductions Enter Second Decade" Quarter Horse Journal May 1993 p. 92-98
- Glover, Diana "Highest Honors" Quarter Horse Journal March 1994 p. 72-79
- Huffman, Christi L. "They Earned a Place" Quarter Horse Journal March 1998 p. 68-75
- Jennings, Jim "1992 Hall of Fame inductees" Quarter Horse Journal May 1992 p. 66-69, 147
- Rusk, Rebecca "It Happened in 1989" Quarter Horse Journal January 1990 p. 68-69
- Wohlfarth, Jenny "'97 Brings Eleven" Quarter Horse Journal March 1997 p. 64-67
- Wohlfarth, Jenny "Heroes for the Hall" Quarter Horse Journal March 1996 p. 56-62
- Wohlfarth, Jenny "Keeping Tradition" Quarter Horse Journal March 1995 p. 68-73
