= Breeder =

Profession

A breeder is a person who selectively breeds carefully selected mates, normally of the same breed, to sexually reproduce offspring with specific, consistently replicable qualities and characteristics. This might be as a farmer, agriculturalist, or hobbyist, and can be practiced on a large or small scale, for food, fun, or profit.

== About ==
A breeder can breed purebred pets such as cats or dogs, livestock such as cattle or horses, and may show their animals professionally in assorted forms of competitions. In these specific instances, the breeder strives to meet standards in each animal set out by organizations. A breeder may also assist with breeding animals in the zoo. In other cases, a breeder can be referred to an animal scientist who has the capabilities of developing more efficient ways to produce the meat and other animal products humans eat.

Earnings as a breeder vary widely because of the various types of work involved in the job title. Even in breeding small domestic animals, the earnings differ. It mostly depends on the type of animal being bred and whether or not the breeder has a reputation of breeding champions. The US Bureau of Labor Statistics reports that large animal breeders that work as veterinarians earned a median annual income of $61,029 in 2006. The other individuals employed in the field of animal science earned $47,800.

== Required education ==
To breed small and domestic animals, no formal training or credentials are required, though it is recommended they familiarize themselves with the desired and standard characteristics of the breed they work with. For those who are seeking to breed more exotic animals, such as those in a zoo, a bachelor's degree in veterinary science is needed. It is also recommended that an individual also goes onto graduate school and specializes in zoology. To breed agricultural animals, a 4-year degree in agricultural science is needed for most entry-level positions.

== See also ==
- Animal breeding
- Animal husbandry
- Animal fancy
- Breeding in the wild
- Plant breeding
- Dog Breeding
