= Equitana =

Equitana is a trade fair organization for equestrian sports. This bi-annual trade fair first opened in 1972 in Essen, Germany, and holds events in Germany, the United States, and Australia.

== Australia ==
Equitana expos have been held biennially in Melbourne since 1999, attracting more than 50,000 visitors per event. In 2004, the event won a Victorian Tourism Award in the Major Event or Festival category.

The event has also been held in Brisbane in 2002 and since 2011 has been held biennially at the Sydney Showgrounds, alternating each year with the Melbourne Showgrounds. Definitive Events have been running Equitana Australia since 1999. In 2014, Equitana returned to the biannual format. In 2016, Equitana will be held at Melbourne Showgrounds from 17 to 20 November. 2018 saw it being held at Sydney. The COVID-19 pandemic caused the 2020 Equitana to go on hiatus until July 2021, when it returns to Melbourne.

In 2026, Equitana Melbourne posted on their website that the 2027 show was cancelled and that no further events would be held.

== Germany ==
The 2009 fair was held on 14–21 March at Essen fairground. More than 850 exhibitors from 30 countries registered for the trade fair, which was visited by 213,000 visitors from Germany and around the world. Equitana is one of Germany's most visited trade fairs.

On 31 March 2010, it was announced that Equitana had entered into a ten-year contract to ensure that Essen which will remain the “horse world’s trade fair capital“ for another five events until the year 2019. The 2011, Equitana took place on 12–20 March 2011. In 2010, Equitana will host a festival of equestrian sports, and in 2013 the Equestrian Sports World Fair will return to Germany.

== United States ==
There is also an Equitana USA, a similar trade fair that was once held in Louisville, Kentucky. As of October 2021 it will be held at the Kentucky Horse Park in Lexington. Over 200 domestic and international exhibitors are scheduled for the 2021 event. There are COVID-19 limitations, however.
