= Depth Charge (horse) =

20th-century American Thoroughbred racehorse

- Sire: Bold Venture
- Grandsire: imported St. Germans
- Dam: Quickly
- Damsire: Haste
- Sex: Stallion
- Foaled: 1941
- Country: United States
- Colour: brown
- Breeder: John D. Hertz
- Record: 16 starts: 5-3-2
- Earnings: $5,943.00

Major wins
- 3rd Myles Standish Stakes

Honours
- AQHA Hall of Fame

Depth Charge (1941–1965) was a Thoroughbred son of Bold Venture who went on to become an outstanding sire of American Quarter Horse racehorses. He was posthumously inducted into the AQHA Hall of Fame

== Background ==
Depth Charge was a registered Thoroughbred son of Bold Venture. His dam was a mare named Quickly, a descendant of The Tetrarch and the imported to the United States stallion Rock Sand. Depth Charge was bred by John D. Hertz. Quickly was also the dam of Count Fleet, a U. S. Triple Crown winner. Depth Charge was a year younger than his famous half brother.

== Racing career ==
Depth Charge raced on the Thoroughbred tracks, piling up a record of five wins, three seconds and two thirds from sixteen starts. His total earnings were $5,943.00, including a third place finish in the Myles Standish Stakes.

== Stud career ==
During his breeding career, Depth Charge sired 174 Thoroughbred foals, with 149 starters and 121 winners. He also sired 220 Quarter Horse foals, with 80 of them earning their AQHA Race Register of Merits. Among his offspring were the Quarter Horse racehorses Johnny Dial, Super Charge, Tiny Charger, Dividend, and Miss Queenie. He also sired Thoroughbred stakes winners including Dark Charger, Free Stride, Queen Margie and Baloma. His highest race earning Quarter Horse foal was Three Deep, who earned $35,258.00.

== Death and honors ==
Depth Charge died in 1965, at Shamrock, Texas. He was inducted into the AQHA Hall of Fame in 1991.

== Pedigree ==
=John O'Gaunt
=Swynford
=Canterbury Pilgrim
*St. Germans
=Torpoint
=Hamoaze
=Maid of the Mist
Bold Venture
Commando
Ultimus
Running Stream
Possible
Royal Flush
Lida Flush
Lida H
Depth Charge
=Maintenon
*Maintenant
=Martha Gorman
Haste
Meddler
Miss Malaprop
Correction
Quickly
=The Tetrarch
*Stefan the Great
=Perfect Peach
Stephanie
*Rock Sand
Malachite
Miss Hanover
