= Traveler (horse) =

Quarter Horse sire

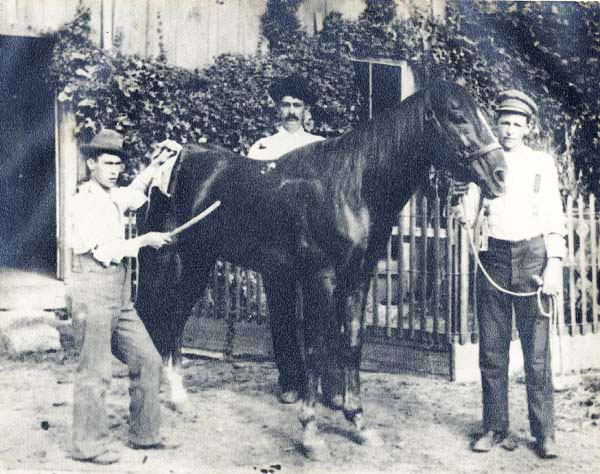
- Traveler
- Breed: Unknown, but a foundation sire for the Quarter Horse
- Discipline: Racing
- Sire: unknown
- Grandsire: unknown
- Dam: unknown
- Maternal grandsire: unknown
- Sex: Stallion
- Foaled: about 1880
- Country: United States
- Color: Sorrel
- Breeder: unknown

Honors
- American Quarter Horse Hall of Fame

Traveler (died 1912), was a foundation sire of the American Quarter Horse breed, but mystery surrounds him as his breeding is completely unknown. It is reported that Traveler was born around 1880 in upstate New York, and was shipped in a boxcar to Texas in the early 1880s to pull Fresno scrapers for the Union Pacific Railroad.

In Texas, Traveler eventually ended up as a match racehorse and stallion around the age of 8–10. Some sources said he had to be broken to ride prior. Some stories have him part of a contractor's work string doing grading work on a railroad being constructed in Eastland County, Texas. Whether or not this story is true, the first recorded owner of Traveler was a man named Brown Seay.

Traveler was a light sorrel horse, with light amounts of roaning on his flanks. His markings were a snip, and a streak on the face. Standing around 15 hands (60 inches; 152 cm), he was leggy but well muscled, although George Clegg said the horse was the shortest backed horse he had ever seen. He was also owned by the Shely brothers, who bred most of his most famous offspring. While owned by Seay, Traveler was match raced extensively in Texas.

Traveler died in 1912, and sources estimate his age at 32. With two broodmares, Fanny Pace and Jenny, he sired the early Quarter Horses Judge Thomas, Judge Welch, and Buster Brown, who was also known as Jack Tolliver, out of Fanny Pace; and Little Joe, King (or "Possum"), and Black Bess out of Jenny; and El Rey, Booger Red, Old Crawford, Texas Chief, John Gardner, and Chulo Mundo, and others by additional mares. However, according to the American Quarter Horse Association, a "large number" of Traveler's male offspring were gelded, and he was better-known as a broodmare sire. Other descendants included Joe Reed II, Hard Twist, Silver King, Tonto Bars Hank, and Tonto Bars Gill.

Traveler was inducted into the AQHA Hall of Fame in 1994.
