= Peter McCue =

Quarter Horse and/or Thoroughbred racehorse and sire

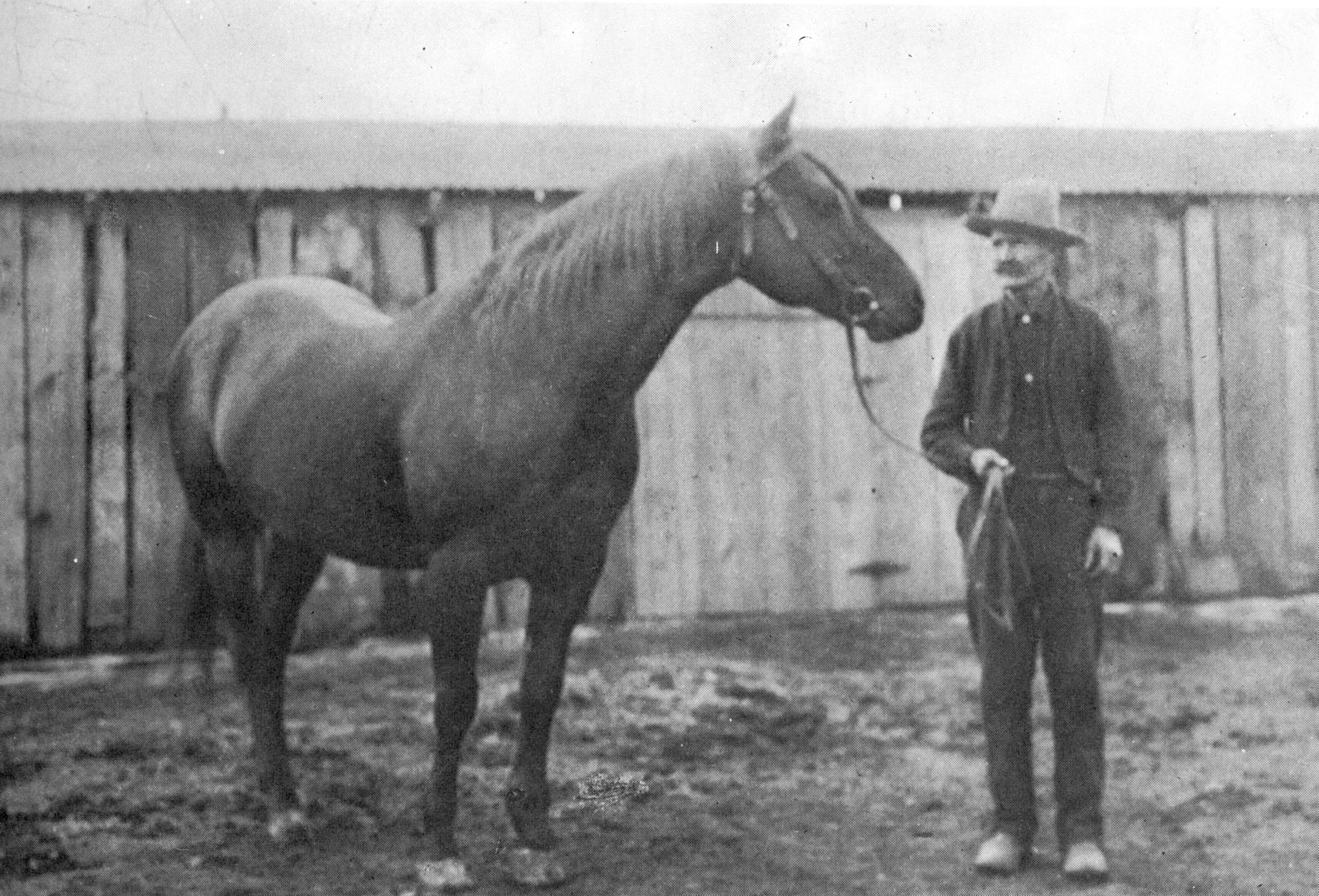
- Peter McCue (left) with Tom Caudill
- Breed: registered with The Jockey Club as a Thoroughbred, but sired by a Quarter Horse
- Sire: Dan Tucker
- Grandsire: Barney Owens
- Dam: Nora M (TB)
- Maternal grandsire: Voltigeur (TB)
- Sex: Stallion
- Foaled: 1895
- Country: United States
- Color: Bay
- Breeder: Samuel Watkins
- Owner: Milo Burlingame; Coke Roberds; John Wilkens

Record
- 41 starts: 9-5-7

Earnings
- $2655.00

Honors
- American Quarter Horse Hall of Fame

Peter McCue (1895–1923) was a racehorse and sire influential in the American Quarter Horse Association (or AQHA), although he died before the AQHA was formed.

== Life ==
Peter McCue (foaled 1895) was registered in the American Stud Book as a Thoroughbred, sired by Duke of the Highlands, but his breeder and his breeder's family always maintained that he was actually sired by a Quarter Horse stallion named Dan Tucker. His dam was a Thoroughbred mare named Nora M, who was a double-bred descendant of the imported stallion Glencoe. One story has it that, the horse was named after a neighbor of the Watkins' family, Peter McCue.

== Racing Career and breeding record ==
Peter McCue raced for a number of years, then was retired to stud, standing in Illinois, Texas, Oklahoma, and Colorado before his death in 1923. Among his offspring were Hickory Bill, A D Reed, Shiek P-11, Chief P-5, Harmon Baker, John Wilkens and Jack McCue.

== Honors ==
Peter McCue was inducted into the AQHA Hall of Fame in 1991.

== Pedigree ==
Old Billy
Cold Deck
Dollie Coker (Maudy)
Barney Owens
unknown
Dollie Overton
unknown
Dan Tucker
Steel Dust
Jack Traveler
Queen
Lady Bug (Butt Cut)
Harry Bluff
June Bug
Munch Meg
Peter McCue
Glencoe (TB)
Vandal (TB)
Sister to Lucy Lea (TB)
Voltigeur (TB)
Highlander (TB) by Glencoe (TB)
Duet (TB)
Delta (TB)
Nora M (TB)
Glencoe (TB)
Star Davis (TB)
Margaret Wood (TB)
Kitty Clyde (TB)
*Margrave (TB)
Margravine (TB)
Gabriella (TB)
