= Speed index =

System for rating the speed of Quarter Horse racehorses

Speed index (sometimes speed rating) is a system of rating the performance of Quarter Horse racehorses. The American Quarter Horse Association (or the AQHA) has used two systems over the history of Quarter Horse racing to evaluate racing performances. The original system used a letter grade, starting at D, then C, B, A and the highest AA. Later AAA was tacked on the top, and later still AAAT (for TOP AAA) was made the top speed. Eventually, this system became too cumbersome, and a new system was introduced: the Speed Index system, which used a number system, with 100 being roughly equivalent to the old AAAT. This change occurred in 1969.

The actual calculation of the speed index starts with taking the three fastest winning times at a particular distance for the past three years at a given track. These times are averaged together, which is then the 100 speed index for that distance at that track. If the average doesn't meet the minimum standard time given by the AQHA for that distance, then the minimum standard time is used instead of the specific track average. To calculate a specific speed index for a specific horse in a specific race, the time the horse finished in is compared to the averaged speed for the distance the race was, and points are added or subtracted based on whether the time was faster or slower than the average. The number of points subtracted or added varies according to the distance of the race, and is based on a chart put out by the AQHA.

The AQHA's award Race Register of Merit is awarded to any horse that achieves a Speed Index of 80 or higher during an approved AQHA race.

== See also ==
- Beyer Speed Figure, a similar rating in North American Thoroughbred racing
- Timeform, an English company that publishes a similar rating for Thoroughbreds throughout the world
