= American Quarter Horse Association =

Breed registry and show organization

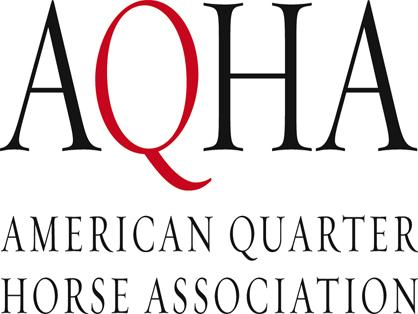
- American Quarter Horse Association logo

- Amarillo (Texas) American Quarter Horse Association
- Abbreviation: AQHA
- Formation: March 14, 1940; 86 years ago
- Legal status: Association
- Headquarters: Amarillo, Texas, United States
- Coordinates: 35.194327°N 101.807792°W
- Region served: Worldwide
- Members: 232,162
- President: Jeff Tebow
- CEO: Karl Stressman
- Website: aqha.com

The American Quarter Horse Association (AQHA), based in Amarillo, Texas, United States, is an international organization dedicated to the preservation, improvement and record-keeping of the American Quarter Horse. The association sanctions many competitive events and maintains the official registry. The organization also houses the American Quarter Horse Hall of Fame and Museum and sponsors educational programs. The organization was founded in 1940 in Fort Worth, Texas, and now has nearly 234,627 members, over 32,000 of whom are international.

== History ==
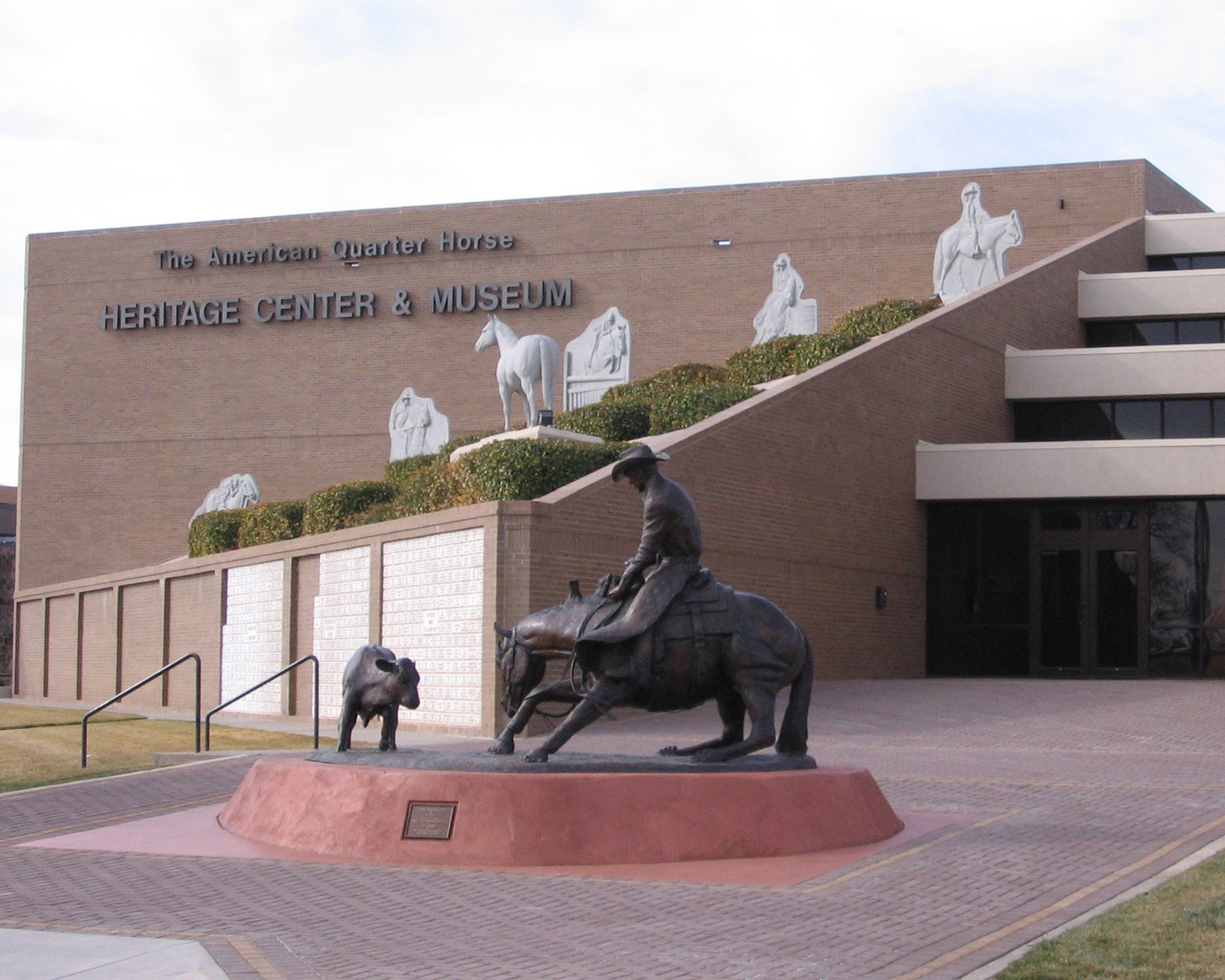
Outside of the American Quarter Horse Association's Hall of Fame & Museum in Amarillo, Texas

The American Quarter Horse Association was born at a meeting on March 15, 1940, in Fort Worth, Texas. The original idea had come from articles published by Robert M. Denhardt during the 1930s about the history and characteristics of the quarter horse. In an article entitled "The Quarter Horse, Then and Now" in a 1939 Western Horseman magazine, Denhardt also suggested that those interested in forming a breed registry meet in Fort Worth to discuss the idea and hopefully act on the idea. About seventy-five people met in Fort Worth to discuss the proposals, with the eventual decision being to form a non-profit stock holding association in Texas to be the registry. Thirty-six people bought stock at the initial meeting. A board of directors and officers were selected.

For the first five years, AQHA was the only registry for American Quarter Horses, however there were controversies over which horses would be registered, as well as how much non-Quarter horse to allow in. Other disputes included the fact that AQHA only allowed stock owners to vote, and some breeders felt that this arrangement kept too much power in too few hands. Another contentious issue was racing, and how the association would support the needs of breeders and owners who raced their Quarter Horses. All three of these issues were woven together, for the racing interests were also desirous of more Thoroughbred blood being added to the Quarter Horse, and some racing breeders felt that the AQHA was too restrictive on what outside blood was allowed in.

The racing interests formed the American Quarter Racing Association (AQRA) on February 1, 1945. This group mainly was concerned with the operation of racetracks and their registration efforts were limited to what was needed for identification for racing purposes. They set the standards for racing, and set up a Register of Merit system to help with handicapping racing. They registered horses that were in AQHA's stud books, as well as Thoroughbreds. Even "Paint" horses, which at this time had no registry and would not for another two decades, were registered. Painted Joe, a foundation stallion with the American Paint Horse Association (APHA), was registered with the AQRA and ran against many of the early Quarter Horse racers.

Individuals who believed AQHA was too restrictive in its registration and membership policies formed the National Quarter Horse Breeders Association (NQHBA) in December 1945. Registration criteria in the NQHBA were much less stringent than AQHA, but yet were not exclusively focused on racing like AQRA. For example, Thoroughbred crosses were freely registrable in NQHBA, and they even registered Thoroughbreds.

Within AQHA, there was a recognition that three organizations were sapping the strengths of the Quarter Horse breeders and owners, and within all three organizations there were efforts to merge. In July 1949, AQHA offered to merge with both AQRA and NQHBA. The AQRA voted to merge with AQHA in September 1949, and the NQHBA did likewise in November 1949. AQHA absorbed both organizations and moved their records to AQHA's recently established headquarters off Interstate 40 in Amarillo.

According to an article in the Amarillo Globe Times, the AQHA was based in College Station, Eagle Pass and Fort Worth before moving to Amarillo (home of the secretary Raymond D. Hollingsworth) in 1947, where they rented space at 1405 B W. 10th Avenue. Their first owned building was constructed in 1952 at 2736 W. 10th Avenue where they remained until construction of the Hall of Fame off Interstate 40 in 1989.

== Registration ==
AQHA now registers the offspring of other American Quarter Horses in its numbered stud book. However, AQHA does not maintain a completely closed stud book; there is also an "Appendix" section. An "Appendix" American Quarter Horse is a first generation cross between a registered Thoroughbred and an American Quarter Horse or a cross between a "numbered" American Quarter Horse and an "appendix" American Quarter Horse. Horses in the "appendix" registry can "earn" their way into the main stud book by completing an extensive set of performance requirements in either racing or some form of show competition and receiving what the Association refers to as a Register of Merit (ROM). Currently there are over 2,800,000 Quarter Horse registrations, 430,000 of which are international.

Horses produced by means of artificial insemination or embryo transfer may be registered, but cloned horses cannot be registered. Parentage now is verified by means of DNA testing.

In recent years, registration requirements for AQHA have significantly changed. In the past, horses with too much white or with cremello traits were not eligible for registration. One reason was lack of a full understanding of equine coat color genetics (For example, people did not know that Palomino is an incomplete form of the cremello dilution gene) and the other was a legitimate concern about a condition called lethal white syndrome, which was not fully understood at the time. There was also belief that excess white indicated "impure" breeding with non-Quarter Horses.

Today, modern DNA testing has now made verification of parentage possible, and also permits the detection of certain genetic diseases such as lethal white syndrome. Thus AQHA now allows registration of "high white" body markings typical of the sabino gene and other pinto spotting patterns. Many horses formerly registrable only as American Paint Horses with APHA are now cross-registered with both registries. Because the genetic mechanism that creates palomino is also understood and has been found to have no connection to lethal white, cremello and perlino coat colors are also allowed.

Cross-registration of American Quarter Horses with APHA, the Palomino Horse Breeders of America (PHBA), and the American Buckskin Registry Association (ABRA), is often a benefit to horses who have these distinct colors.

Currently, AQHA is in the process of phasing out registration of horses who carry the dominant genetic disease hyperkalemic periodic paralysis (HYPP) and sponsored research that, in 2007, developed a genetic test for HERDA.

== Competition and awards ==
Currently AQHA recognizes achievement by American Quarter Horses and their owners with a number of awards. Some are annual, some are based on lifetime achievement. AQHA awards points to horses competing in horse show, rodeo and horse racing. AQHA assigns points to animals who win or place in horse shows and on the racetrack. The number of points given depends in part on placing and on how many other horses were in the class or race. Accumulated points result in annual awards to the top competitors and certain lifetime achievement recognitions for both horse and rider.

=== AQHA affiliates ===
As of 2023, AQHA has affiliate associations in 49 US states, 7 Canadian provinces, and 34 other countries.

=== Horse shows and rodeos ===
Today, people show American Quarter Horses in a variety of competitive events, including, but not limited to, halter classes; western style events such as Western Pleasure, Reining, and cutting; English riding events in the hunt seat style, such as Hunter Under Saddle, working hunter, and hunter hack. Driving classes are available at some shows, as are some timed games. There are also equitation and halter showmanship classes for non-pro exhibitors.

The annual AQHA World Show, the largest AQHA-sponsored event, is held in November of each year in Oklahoma City.

In the show ring, the AQHA awards a number of year end awards, including Rookie of the Year (awarded at the state, regional, and national level); Year End Top-Ten awards in for the Open Junior Horse, Open Senior Horse, Youth and Amateur divisions; Year End High Point awards in the same divisions; Year End High point all around and reserve all around in the same divisions, and a few miscellaneous awards to novice and limited riders. As lifetime awards, the AQHA awards Register of Merits in Performance and Halter, AQHA Champion, AQHA Performance Champion, AQHA Versatility Champion, Superior Event Horse, Supreme Championships in the three showing divisions (Youth, Open, Amateur), and a Supreme Performance Champion.

==== Year end awards ====
Requirements can change, these are the current requirements as of January 2010.

Award	Awarded to	Current requirements
Justin Boots State Rookie of the Year	Awarded per state/province in the Amateur and Youth divisions in any events	Highest point earning rookie
Justin Boots Rookie of the Year	Awarded nationally (US & Canada) in Amateur and Youth age divisions in any events	Highest point earning rookie
Year End High Point Horse	Open, Amateur, Youth in each event, also to next nine-highest earners in the event	Highest number of points in the event
Year End All Around High Point Horse	Open Junior Horse, Open Senior Horse, Amateur, Youth, also to reserve and third-place finishers	Highest number of points in halter and two performance events

==== Lifetime awards ====
Requirements can change, these are the current requirements as of January 2010.

Award	Available in which divisions	Current requirements
Register of Merit	Open, Amateur, Youth in both Halter and Performance events	Halter – 10 points in either Halter or Performance Halter; Performance – 10 points in one or more performance events
Versatility Award	Open, Amateur, Youth in Performance events	At least 65 points in 8 events, with at least 10 points in each of 5 different events
AQHA Champion	Open, Amateur, Youth	At least 35 points, with at least 15 in Halter and at least 15 in Performance, along with some other requirements
AQHA Supreme Champion	Open	At least 40 points, with 15 in Halter, 20 in Performance and two AAA or Speed Index ratings of 90 or better, plus some other requirements
AQHA Supreme Champion	Amateur, Youth	At least 50 points, with 15 in Halter and 20 in Performance along with some other requirements.
Superior All-Around	Open, Amateur, Youth	50 total All-Around awards at shows
Superior Event Horse	Open, Amateur, Youth	50 Points earned in one event, such as Halter, Roping, etc.
Performance Champion	Open, Amateur, Youth	Earn 3 individual Superior Event awards
Supreme Performance Champion	Open, Amateur, Youth	Earn 6 individual Superior Event awards, not including Halter

AQHA also recognizes horses that compete outside of AQHA sanctioned shows. Some awards go to horses that compete in the Professional Rodeo Cowboys Association (PRCA) timed rodeo events, others go to horses competing in the United States Team Penning Association, National Cutting Horse Association, or the National High School Rodeo or National Intercollegiate Rodeo Association.

=== Racing ===
On the racetrack, AQHA offers year-end champion awards in age and sex divisions, plus broodmare, distance horse, Canadian champion, owner, breeder, trainer, and jockey. Thus there is a champion two-year-old colt, filly and gelding plus champion two-year-old from the preceding. The three-year-old and aged categories work the same way, with the World Champion being chosen from the winners of the age and sex divisions. In addition to the year end awards, there are three lifetime awards - Race Register of Merit, Superior Race Horse and Supreme Race Horse. A Register of Merit is awarded when a horse attains a speed index of 80 or above. A Superior Race Horse is achieved when the horse earns 200 racing points. A Supreme Race Horse award requires the horse to satisfy the following three criteria: (1) win over $500,000 in earnings, (2) win two Grade 1 stakes races and (3) win a total of ten races.

In 1993, AQHA launched Quarter Horse racing's first series of races with a championship-ending day, called The Bank of America Racing Challenge. It is a series of 60 races run throughout North and South America with the winners of each race earning a starting berth into a season-ending Championship Day. The Bank of America Racing Challenge currently offers nearly $6 million in purse and bonus awards.

=== Pleasure riding ===
AQHA also offers a Horseback Riding Program, which rewards AQHA members for pleasure riding of American Quarter Horses. Riders log their hours spent riding, and receive recognition awards and prizes. From January to December 31. The horse must be registered with the AQHA and his number and registration name will be needed to peripatetic.

== See also ==
- American Quarter Horse
- American Quarter Horse Hall of Fame

== Sources ==
- Denhardt, Robert Moorman (1976). "Organization of the American Quarter Horse Association". Foundation Sires of the American Quarter Horse. University of Oklahoma Press. ISBN 0-8061-1337-5.
- Goodhue, Jim (1993). "A History of Early AQHA Registration". Legends: Outstanding Quarter Horse Stallions and Mares. Western Horseman. pp. 4–10. ISBN 0-911647-26-0. OL 1141633M.
- Haynes, Glynn W. (1976). The American Paint Horse. University of Oklahoma Press. ISBN 0-8061-2144-0. OL 7939507M.
- Oelke, Hardy (1992). The Paint Horse: An American Treasure. Germany: Kierdorf. ISBN 3-89118-075-6.
- Price, Steven D. (1999). The American Quarter Horse" An Introduction to Selection, Care, and Enjoyment. New York, N.Y: Lyons Press. ISBN 978-1-55821-643-3. OL 359140M.
