= Doc Quixote =

American Quarter Horse stallion

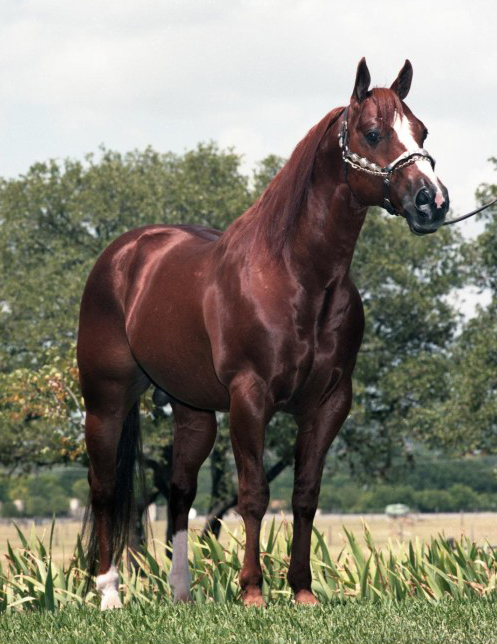
- Discipline: Cutting
- Sire: Doc Bar
- Grandsire: Lightning Bar
- Dam: Magnolia Gal
- Maternal grandsire: Bulls Eye
- Sex: Stallion
- Foaled: 1970
- Died: 2002 (aged 31–32)
- Country: United States
- Color: Chestnut
- Breeder: Yvonne LeMaitre, Woodland, CA
- Owner: Heins Investment, MT

Other awards
- 1973 NCHA Futurity Champion

Honors
- NCHA Horse Hall of Fame

Doc Quixote (1970–2002) was the 1973 NCHA Non Pro Futurity Champion ridden by Paul Crumpler of Wichita Falls, Texas. He was a chestnut stallion, stood 15 hands high, and was registered American Quarter Horse #0698787. He was the first cutting horse stallion to ever be syndicated, reportedly with shares valued at $100,000 (US). As a sire, Doc Quixote's offspring have earned more than $10 million including four that were inducted into the NCHA Horse Hall of Fame: Poco Quixote Rio ($1,108,773), Docs Okie Quixote ($637,707) NCHA Triple Crown Champion, Cash Quixote Rio ($604,742), and Jazzote ($586,212).

== Pedigree ==
Percentage
Three Bars (TB)
Myrtle Dee
Lightning Bar
Doc Horn
Della P
Mare By Old DJ
Doc Bar
My Texas Dandy
Texas Dandy
Streak
Dandy Doll
Bartender II
Bar Maid F
Nelly Bly
Doc Quixote
Joe Reed
Joe Reed II
Nellene
Bulls Eye
Bayard
Nevermiss
Quail 1
Magnolia Gal
Zandy
Sport
Lowrys Mabel
Sporty Gal
Clint Rutherford Horse
Shellys Cricket
Unknown mare
