= Smart Little Lena =

Quarter Horse show horse and sire

- Breed: American Quarter Horse
- Discipline: Cutting
- Sire: Doc O'Lena
- Grandsire: Doc Bar
- Dam: Smart Peppy
- Maternal grandsire: Peppy San
- Sex: Stallion
- Foaled: June 29, 1979
- Died: August 30, 2010 (aged 31); Manion Ranch; Aubrey, Texas
- Country: United States of America
- Color: Chestnut
- Breeder: Hanes Chatham

Earnings
- US$743,275

Major wins
- NCHA Futurity, NCHA Super Stakes and NCHA Derby

Honours
- American Quarter Horse Hall of Fame; National Cutting Horse Association Hall of Fame

Smart Little Lena (June 29, 1979–August 30, 2010) was an AQHA registered Quarter Horse, an NCHA Triple Crown Champion cutting horse, and sire of champion cutting horses. He was inducted into both the AQHA Hall of Fame and NCHA Horse Hall of Fame. He was sired by NCHA Futurity Champion Doc O'Lena and out of the mare Smart Peppy by Peppy San, who was the first NCHA World Champion to sire an NCHA World Champion.

Smart Little Lena was a dark sorrel stallion with a blazed face and white socks on both hind feet. He was a small horse, standing only 13.3 hands (55 inches, 140 cm). Hanes Chatham bred and raised Smart Little Lena, broke him and started him on cattle as a two-year-old. The late Bill Freeman of Rosston, Texas trained and showed Smart Little Lena throughout his career.

Chatham created the Smart Little Lena syndicate in 1982, co-managed the syndicate with Freeman, and sold the initial shares for $5,000.00 each. Smart Little Lena was the first cutting horse stallion to be syndicated prior to ever being shown.

== Career ==
In 1982 Smart Little Lena won the National Cutting Horse Association (NCHA) Futurity. He later won first in both the NCHA Super Stakes and Derby as well. These three events compose what is now known as the NCHA Triple Crown. Lena won the Triple Crown in 1982 and 1983. Smart Little Lena has lifetime earnings of US$743,275 in just eight shows. He was No. 4 all-time per Equi-Stat records. As of 2010, he still held the record for most money earned as a 3- and 4-year-old cutter at $643,275. Lastly, as of 2010, he was still the second-leading sire in the NCHA. He was also a National Reined Cow Horse Association (NRCHA) $1 Million Sire in 2011. As of June 30, 2019, his produce earnings as a sire were $1,214,960.01.

Due to his earnings of over $39 million, Smart Little Lena is in second place for all-time cutting horse sires. With a total of $57 million of foal earnings, he is first place as the leading maternal grandsire. The stallion sired 17 world champions, 11 reserve world champions, and 110 register of merit world champions.

He was inducted into the American Quarter Horse Hall of Fame (AQHA) in 2015. He was also inducted into the NCHA Horse Hall of Fame.

== Smart Little Lena Syndicate ==
Hanes Chatham syndicated Smart Little Lena in 1982 prior to the horse being shown. Chatham co-managed the syndicate with his trainer Bill Freeman. The initial shares were sold for $5,000.00 each, but with each leg of the NCHA Triple Crown that was won by Smart Little Lena, the value of the shares increased exponentially; some of which sold for as much as $75,000. As a breeding stallion, Smart Little Lena spent his life at Manion Ranch in Pilot Point, TX under the supervision of Quarter Horse trainer and breeder Tommy Manion.

In 2004, Bill Freeman's former wife, Karen, filed a lawsuit in the 181st District Court in Amarillo, TX against Bill Freeman, the Smart Little Lena Syndicate and its co-managers, and Jill Freeman, who was Bill's wife at the time. The lawsuit was over property Karen was awarded but had not yet received from the divorce settlement. Judge John Board, who presided over the case, was made aware of the conflicts within the syndicate, and ordered a mutually agreed upon third co-manager to work with co-managers Hanes Chatham and Bill Freeman. Mike Kelley, a former NCHA Executive Director, was selected. The presiding judge also ordered a meeting of the syndicate shareholders to be held as part of the settlement dispute.

In 2006, 51 shareholders owning a total of 80 shares comprised the syndicate. At the time, the largest shareholder with 10 shares was L. Leedy of Duncan Investments in Oklahoma. Freeman had 7 shares, Manion had 5, St. Nick’s Pines had 3, Freeman's former wife Karen had 3, Irene Ayres had 2½ and the remainder of the shareholders owned 2 or less. On September 22, 2006 a shareholder's meeting was held and resulted in the following resolutions:

- Bill Freeman was removed as syndicate co-manager;
- Freeman's wife Jill was removed as syndicate secretary;
- The Freemans’ lost signature rights on all stallion business and syndicate accounts;
- the syndicate was to be represented by legal counsel;
- Bill and Jill Freeman were to immediately reimburse all misappropriated and/or misused syndicate funds;
- action would be taken to restore the devaluation of shareholders’ investments in the syndicate, and those responsible for the devaluation would be held accountable.

Bill Freeman died on July 29, 2008. A different settlement was reached during a meeting of shareholders and an agreement was signed on Thursday, October 16, 2008 as part of the overall settlement for the ongoing litigation. On October 20, 2008, the case in Amarillo's 181st District Court was dismissed with prejudice against future lawsuits or claims of wrongful death. The syndicate members were awarded $447,500.00 ($310,000 going to attorney's fees). The balance of $137,500 was paid to Manion in exchange for him dropping the libel and slander claims against the Freeman parties.

== Offspring ==
Smart Little Lena's descendants have competed in every discipline in AQHA competition, and have earned 9,744 points and 22 world championships. In National Reining Horse Association competition, his get have earned $1.8 million. In the National Reined Cow Horse Association they have earned $2.56 million. In the NCHA they have won over $50 million.

His offspring have earned $1,033,534,.03 in NRCHA competition. Lil Miss Smarty Chex was inducted into the NRCHA Hall of Fame in 2012. Two Smart Little Lena's sons, Smart Chic Olena and Very Smart Remedy are also NRCHA $1 Million Sires.

=== Genetic preservation ===
From 2004 - 2007, semen was collected from Smart Little Lena, and then frozen in an effort to preserve his genetics. The frozen semen is maintained at a facility in Aubrey, TX. Veterinarian Whitt Byers provided a 2008 report that contained an inventory of Smart Little Lena's frozen semen, and consisted of 163 conventional doses and 3,473 ICSI (Intracytoplasmic Sperm Injection) doses. The ICSI doses are single ½ ml. straws, and require special preparation of the mare which involves follicle aspiration and ovary dissection. The mare is flushed of oocytes (eggs) which are then in vitro-matured, and fertilized by direct injection of sperm into the oocyte. The typical cost of an ICSI procedure in 2018 was approximately $8,000 per mare.

== Death ==
When Smart Little Lena was 31 years old, he was euthanized in 2010, after he apparently suffered a stroke. Smart Little Lena was home on Manion Ranch in Aubrey, Texas, on Monday, August 30, 2010, when this occurred. The horse had been suffering balance problems for a few days prior to this incident, according to the breeding manager. The syndicate who owned the stallion indicated that he would be cremated and then his remains placed into a box in a trophy case at the ranch. However, he still sires foals through artificial insemination.

== Sire line tree ==
- Smart Little Lena
  - Smart Chic Olena
    - A Chic In Time
    - Smart Spook
      - Custom Spook
      - Red Stripe Spook
      - Shine N Spook
        - The Spook Dun Time
      - Spooks N Jewels
    - Chics Magic Potion
    - Olena Oak
      - Dual Oak E
    - Collen All Chics
    - Travelin Jonez
  - Very Smart Remedy
    - Smart Luck
    - Very Shiney
    - Smart Medicine Man
    - Very Black Magic

== Pedigree ==
Pedigree of Smart Little Lena
Sire Doc O'Lena	Doc Bar	Lightning Bar	Three Bars
Sire Doc O'Lena	Doc Bar	Lightning Bar	Della P
Sire Doc O'Lena	Doc Bar	Dandy Doll	Texas Dandy
Sire Doc O'Lena	Doc Bar	Dandy Doll	Bar Maid F
Sire Doc O'Lena	Poco Lena	Poco Bueno	King^{†}
Sire Doc O'Lena	Poco Lena	Poco Bueno	Miss Taylor
Sire Doc O'Lena	Poco Lena	Sheilwin	Pretty Boy
Sire Doc O'Lena	Poco Lena	Sheilwin	Mare by Blackburn
Dam Smart Peppy	Peppy San	Leo San	Leo
Dam Smart Peppy	Peppy San	Leo San	San Sue Darks
Dam Smart Peppy	Peppy San	Peppy Belle	Pep Up
Dam Smart Peppy	Peppy San	Peppy Belle	Belle Burnett
Dam Smart Peppy	Royal Smart	Royal King	King^{†}
Dam Smart Peppy	Royal Smart	Royal King	Rocket Laning
Dam Smart Peppy	Royal Smart	Moss Jackie Tobin	Wordlaws Tobin
Dam Smart Peppy	Royal Smart	Moss Jackie Tobin	Miss Jack Pot XI

^{†}Denotes inbreeding
