= Tap O Lena =

Champion cutting horse mare

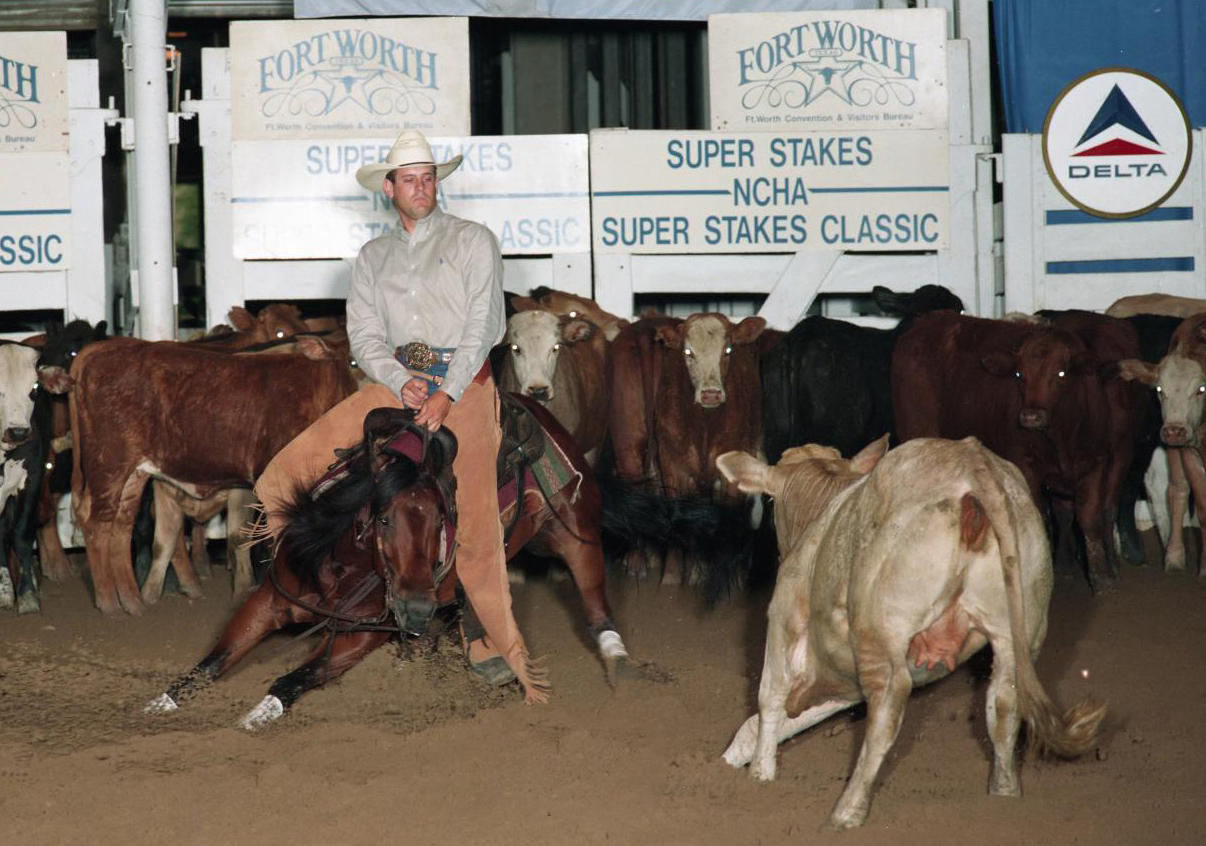
Phil Rapp with Tap O Lena, 1994

Tap O Lena (1990 – 2015) was a bay Quarter Horse mare, a champion cutting horse and a dam and granddam of champion cutting horses. She was bred, trained and shown by NCHA Rider Hall of Fame and NCHA Non-Pro Hall of Fame inductee Phil Rapp of Weatherford, TX who rode her to win 15 major NCHA aged event championships. Rapp's wife Mary Ann also showed the mare, and won 2 more non-pro championships, including the 1997 Non-Pro World Champion. Tap O Lena was inducted into the NCHA Horse Hall of Fame with lifetime earnings of $450,639.33 in cutting horse competition. She was bred to Dual Pep and produced Tapt Twice, earner of $279,457 and sire of cutting horses that have earned over $1.3 million.

Year	Aged Event	Age	Division	Rider
1994	NCHA Super Stakes	4	Open	Phil Rapp
1994	Augusta Futurity	4	Non-Pro	Phil Rapp
1994	NCHA Derby	4	Non-Pro	Phil Rapp
1994	Chisholm Trail Derby	4	Non-Pro	Phil Rapp
1994	Pacific Coast Derby	4	Non-Pro	Phil Rapp
1995	NCHA CLASSIC	5-6	Open	Phil Rapp
1995	NCHA CLASSIC	5-6	Non-Pro	Phil Rapp
1995	Steamboat Springs Derby	5-6	Non-Pro	Phil Rapp
1995	Chisholm Trail Futurity	5-6	Non-Pro	Phil Rapp
1996	NCHA Super Stakes Classic	5-6	Open	Phil Rapp
1996	NCHA Super Stakes Classic	5-6	Non-Pro	Phil Rapp
1996	Bonanza	5-6	Non-Pro	Phil Rapp
1996	Chisholm Trail Futurity	5-6	Non-Pro	Phil Rapp
1996	Memphis Futurity	5-6	Non-Pro	Phil Rapp
1996	El Cid Futurity	5-6	Non-Pro	Phil Rapp
1996	Southern Futurity	5-6	Non-Pro	Mary Ann Rapp
1997	NCHA World Finals	all ages	Non-Pro	Mary Ann Rapp

== Pedigree ==
Three Bars (horse)
Lightning Bar
Della P
Doc Bar
Texas Dandy
Dandy Doll
Bar Maid F
Doc O'Lena
King P-234
Poco Bueno
Miss Taylor
Poco Lena
Pretty Boy
Sheilwin
Mare By Blackburn
Tap O Lena
Lightning Bar
Doc Bar
Dandy Doll
Docs Oak
Poco Tivio
Susies Bay
Susie L
Tapeppyoka Peppy
Leo San
Mr San Peppy
Peppy Belle
Senorita Peppy
El Rey Rojo
Cigarrera
Tacha Martin
