= Docs Okie Quixote =

Quarter Horse stallion

Docs Okie Quixote (1980—1985), AQHA #1613457, was a sorrel Quarter Horse stallion. In 1984, he became the second horse ever to win the NCHA Triple Crown (1983-1984), and 1st to be owned, trained, and ridden by the same person, Joe Heim, a cutting horse trainer from Thackerville, OK, and NCHA Riders Hall of Fame inductee. The other two Triple Crown winners are Smart Little Lena, ridden by Bill Freeman (1982-1983); and Chiquita Pistol, ridden by Tag Rice (2002-2003). Docs Okie Quixote is an NCHA Horse Hall of Fame inductee.

== Pedigree ==
Three Bars (TB)
Lightning Bar
Della P
Doc Bar
Texas Dandy
Dandy Doll
Bar Maid F
Doc Quixote
Joe Reed II
Bulls Eye
Nevermiss
Magnolia Gal
Sport
Sporty Gal
Shellys Cricket
Docs Okie Quixote
Poco Bueno
Poco Tivio
Sheilwin
Johnny Tivio
Candy Kid
Chowchilla Pee Wee
Dora
Jimmette Too
Lightning Bar
Doc Bar
Dandy Doll
Docs Jimmette
Jimmie Reed
Jimmette
Dottie Dee
