= Lynx Melody =

Quarter Horse mare and show horse

- Breed: American Quarter Horse
- Discipline: Cutting
- Sire: Doc's Lynx
- Grandsire: Doc Bar
- Dam: Trona
- Maternal grandsire: Leon Bars
- Sex: Mare
- Foaled: 1975
- Country: United States
- Color: Sorrel

Other awards
- 1978 National Cutting Horse Association (NCHA) Futurity Champion; 1979 Pacific Coast Maturity; 1979 NCHA Derby Champion; 1980 NCHA World Champion Mare $113,681.00 NCHA Lifetime earnings

Honors
- American Quarter Horse Hall of Fame
- Last updated on: March 3, 2008.

Lynx Melody (1975–2004) was an American Quarter Horse mare who was a National Cutting Horse Association (NCHA) World Champion in 1980 as well as winning both the NCHA Derby and Futurity. She was inducted into the American Quarter Horse Association's (AQHA) Hall of Fame in 2008.

== Life ==
Lynx Melody was a sorrel, foaled in 1975. She won the 1978 NCHA Futurity, as well as the 1979 NCHA Derby. In 1980 she was named the NCHA World Champion Mare. Her lifetime NCHA earnings were $113,681.00. She died in September 2004.

== Pedigree ==
Three Bars (TB)
Lightning Bar
Della P
Doc Bar
Texas Dandy
Dandy Doll
Bar Maid F
Doc's Lynx
Poco Bueno
Poco Tivio
Sheilwin
Jameen Tivio
Jimmie Reed
Jameen
Lady Colonel Clyde
Lynx Melody
Percentage (TB)
Three Bars (TB)
Myrtle Dee (TB)
Leon Bars
Joe Hancock Jr
Bubbles II
Underwood mare
Trona
King P-234
Royal King
Rocket Laning
Miss Royal Fleet
Sonny Kimble
Fletter
Princess
