= Eternal Sun =

Quarter Horse stallion

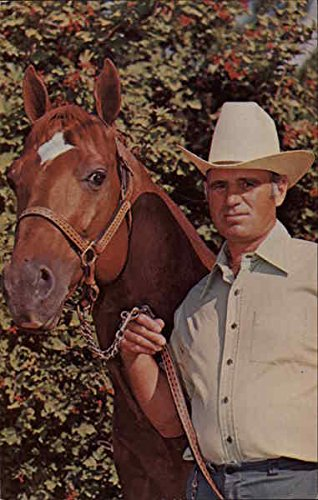
- Eternal Sun with his owner, Harold Howard
- Breed: Quarter Horse
- Discipline: Racing; Halter; Cutting
- Sire: Eternal War
- Grandsire: Silver King
- Dam: Sierra Glitter
- Maternal grandsire: Diamond Villiant
- Sex: Stallion
- Foaled: 1958
- Died: 1985 (aged 26–27)
- Country: United States
- Color: Sorrel
- Breeder: John L. Taylor
- Owner: B.F. Phillips, Jr.; Harold Howard

Record
- 12–2–1–1, AAA speed rating

Earnings
- $1,676.00

Major wins
- Los Alamitos Championship (twice)

Other awards
- AQHA Racing Register of Merit; AQHA Champion

Honors
- Michigan Quarter Horse Association Hall of Fame
- Last updated on: September 9, 2017.

Eternal Sun (1958–1985) was an American Quarter Horse foaled in 1958. He was a Quarter Horse race horse and an American Quarter Horse Association (AQHA) show horse who competed in cutting and halter classes. He earned numerous AQHA awards throughout his career, including an AQHA Championship. He was also a sire of 908 foals, many of whom are themselves AQHA award earners and race horses. He was inducted into the Michigan Quarter Horse Association Hall of Fame in 1989, later followed by his daughter, Eternal Linda. He died at the age of 27 in 1985 on Harold Howard's farm.

== Life ==
Progeny of top Thoroughbred stallions such as Piggin String, Depth Charge, Spotted Bull, and Three Bars began to dominate in Quarter Horse racing in the mid-to-late 1940s, and then moved into AQHA show competitions. A decade after Lightning Bar was one of the first half-breds to make a name for himself, Eternal Sun "raised the bar for all of the two-way race and show hopefuls that followed".

Eternal Sun was a 1958 Sorrel stallion sired by Eternal War and out of Sierra Glitter by Silver King. He was registered as an American Quarter Horse. He had a white star on his forehead and a white sock on both hind legs. John L. Taylor of Chino, California, bred Eternal Sun. Eternal Sun's sire, Eternal War, was a 1944 Bay stallion by Eternal Bull and out of Red Haze. Both Bull Dog and Man O' War were his grandsire. This resulted in Eternal War being closed related to Spotted Bull. Eternal War won two races, placed third in two races, and earned $28,650. He was a notable stud who sired 120 Thoroughbreds, 107 of which collectively won 412 races and $710,747. Eternal War also sired two Quarter Horse foals, but only Eternal Sun performed.

Eternal Sun's dam, Sierra Glitter, was a 1950 Sorrel mare by Silver King P-183 and out of Diamond Villiant. Wilbur D. May bred her, and she was foaled on his Double Diamond Ranch near Reno, Nevada. Sierra Glitter's sire, Silver King P-183, a 1937 Bay stallion by Old Sorrel P-209 and out of Clegg Mare No. 3, was bred by the King Ranch of Kingsville, Texas. As a close relative to four influential south Texas stallions, he was a noted broodmare sire. Her dam, Diamond Villiant, was a 1934 Sorrel mare by Cap and out of a Valiant mare. Roy Valiant of Sonora, Texas, bred her. She was descended from Shiloh and Steel Dust and was the dam of one Register of Merit racehorse. Eternal Sun thus had very different breeding from his top side to his bottom side, but the mixture proved to be very effective.

In the late 1950s Eternal Sun's breeder Taylor was living on the West Coast breeding some very well-known Quarter Horses of both genders. Some examples include Dividend, Poco Pico, Poco Bueno, Spotted Bull, and Lightning Bar. Taylor was primarily a show-horse breeder. However, he was also a visionary. He believed that "race-bred stallions, when crossed on heavier-muscled, halter-type mares, would be capable of producing Quarter Horses that could excel in both venues". In 1957, he bred Sierra Glitter, a halter point earner, to Eternal War, a racehorse. The result was Eternal Sun.

Taylor was killed in an automobile accident in January 1959. In August 1959, all of his horses were liquidated in a sale that established an all-time high average of $5,806 on 51 head, a price that firmly beat the previous high of $2,362. The 3,000 attendees bid so intensely the record for a mare selling at auction was set and broken four times that day on Pretty Buck. Eternal Sun's dam Sierra Glitter set a record price for a Quarter Horse when the final bid for her was $14,200. Parker McAvoy of Rio Vista Farms out of Fresno, California, acquired Sierra Glitter that day.

American Quarter Horse Hall of Fame inductee B.F. Phillips, Jr., of Frisco, Texas, attended the sale and purchased three horses. His purchases totaled $14,700, and Eternal Sun, a yearling at the time, was one of them, for whom he paid $2,100. He also acquired Dividend for $11,000 and Sunday Echols, a daughter of Ed Echols and in foal to Dividend, for $1,600.

== Career ==
=== Racing career ===
Phillips originally operated a cattle ranch, but decided in the late 1940s to liquidate his cattle business. Instead, he started a horse operation. A cutting show interested him so much that he started breeding and showing cow horses. In the early 1960s, he also started a stallion operation. In particular, he stood three stallions of his own, of which Eternal Sun was one. When Phillips returned to his Expectation Stud Farm, his new horses joined the existing stallions including Ed Echols, Steel Bars, Double Bid, and Chuck Wagon W. When Phillips felt Eternal Sun was old enough, the horse was trained for track racing.

Phillips ran Eternal Sun in Quarter Horse horse racing for two years. Quarter Horse racing is different from Thoroughbred racing, in that distances are shorter. One sportswriter equated Quarter Horse racing to Olympic sprinting and Thoroughbred racing to Olympic distance running.

In 1961, Phillips added Eternal Sun to his race string. He ran the stallion moderately as a two- and three-year old, and the horse earned a AAA rating. Eternal Sun's racing record is 12 starts in two years. He won two of his 12 races, placed second in one, and third in another. He earned a total of $1,676 in purse money. In 1960, Eternal Sun raced three times at the Los Alamitos Race Course, not placing in any of those races. In 1961, Eternal Sun raced at the Bay Meadows Racetrack (now defunct) and the Los Alamitos Race Course. At Bay Meadows he placed second in one of the maiden races. At Los Alamitos, he placed third in one of the allowance races, and he placed first two times in two other races. Although his race performance was unspectacular, Eternal Sun's conformation was evidence of his breeder's assurance the horse would have as a show horse and sire.

=== Early show career and breeding ===
On September 2, 1962, Eternal Sun was shown for the first time as a two-year-old at a show in Siloam Springs, Arkansas, where he earned grand champion. He was shown one additional time as a two-year-old on November 16, where he placed first in a class of 10 in Baton Rouge, Louisiana.

In the spring of 1962, Phillips also made a test run with Eternal Sun by breeding him to some of his ranch mares. Sun's first foal crop appeared in 1963. The first crop gave Sun his first two champions. Eternal Ben, sorrel stallion out of Benetta Bar, who became an AQHA Champion. Then there was Matt Sun, who was a dun stallion out of Sun Arrow, also an AHQA Champion, earned a Superior in halter and 74 total halter points.

In 1964, Phillips decided to show him again. In January, he showed Sun at the National Western Stock Show in Denver, Colorado. The 6-year-old stallion was named the reserve grand champion stallion. This came after being placed first in a class of 30 aged stallions. Phillips then hauled him back to Texas. He showed Sun at the Southwestern Exposition and Livestock Show in Fort Worth, Texas. He earned placed third in a class of 46 aged stallions. Also in Fort Worth, he earned grand champion stallion honors at both the San Antonio Stock Show & Rodeo and the Houston Livestock Show & Rodeo.

Phillips showed him six more times that year. The stallion placed first and grand at shows in Denton and Whitesboro, Texas. He also earned a first and reserve in Natchez, Mississippi; Little Rock, Arkansas; and Monroe, Louisiana. In 1964, Eternal Sun topped off his notable sophomore year as a show horse when he earned grand champion stallion honors at the 1964 State Fair of Texas in Dallas, Texas.

=== Sale ===
Phillips' interests changed again and he became interested in race horses. In October 1966, Phillips had a three-day dispersal sale where he sold his breeding stallions. On October 18, the second day of the sale, Harold Howard of Remus, Michigan, bought Eternal Sun for $26,000, along with four mares. Howard was a newcomer in the horse business.

=== Harold Howard and Michigan ===
Harold Howard owned a strawberry farm in Remus, Michigan, and plowed his land with draft horses. Always on the lookout for "an eye-catching horse that could do it all", in 1966 he came across an ad in Quarter Horse Journal for Phillips' sale that included a photo of Eternal Sun. Howard drove to Texas and was the top bidder for the stallion. However, he was short of cash, and wrote an IOU on the corner of Phillips' sale catalog. Eternal Sun was 8 years old at the time. "Horses [in Michigan] were a lot shorter and stockier", Howard's daughter Mari Kay said. "Eternal Sun had an elegant head and neck and an irresistible charisma. I'll never forget his eyes: His foals always had his eyes." In 1967, the American Quarter Horse Association invited the Howards to show Eternal Sun at Stallion Row at the inaugural All American Quarter Horse Congress. Howard and his six children bred the stallion and his offspring, and also showed the horses. Howard channeled his experience from driving plow horses into show driving, and he learned to pleasure drive as well as halter drive. Demand for Eternal Sun's progeny was so high that they sometimes were sold almost as soon as they finished training. Howard's son, Dar, started the colts under saddle, and he spent five years working with one of them, Eternal Pete. Eternal Pete was a 1970 sorrel stallion out of Palleoana. He became an AQHA Champion and earned a Superior in halter. Once Eternal Pete got his AQHA Championship, he and Dar competed in state reining competitions, which they won for two consecutive years. Eternal Sun was a leading sire in six AQHA categories. According to Dar, Howard said that "there weren't many horses that paid their own way. 'Eternal' built his barn and helped buy the farm we have now".

== Progeny ==
AQHA registered Eternal Sun in their stud book as number 0151802. Eternal Sun sired 908 Quarter Horse foals in his lifetime.

=== Summary of progeny accomplishments ===
- 343 performers
- 59 race starters
- One world championship
- 2 high-point awards
- 34 AQHA championships
- 108 performance ROMs
- 3,598 halter points
- 5,612 performance points
- 9,210 points across all divisions

Also, in 1968, Eternal Sun was the fourth leading producer of Halter Champions. After a few years of breeding, the farm had grown to over 200 horses. Eternal Sun was highly sought as a sire and passed on his characteristics to most of the colts born on the farm.

Noted AQHA Hall of Fame breeder and owner Carol Harris of BoBett Farm in Riddick, Florida, recalled seeing Matlock Rose show Eternal Sun once. Harris is most well known for her AQHA Hall of Fame horse, Rugged Lark. Eternal Sun's demeanor and physical traits impressed Harris so much, she brought her champion mare, Judy Dell, to him; the result, a colt named Eternal Dell, "made [Harris] a winner". She relates that "His (Howard's) wonderful stallion was a very big part of my success." She later brought another of her top-notch horses to him, Majestic Dell, (by Eternal Dell and out of AQHA Hall of Fame Quarter Horse Quo Vadis by Little Lloyd), whom Harris regarded almost as highly as Rugged Lark. Eternal Dell was a 1965 sorrel stallion who earned 35 halter points and was a top sire for Harris. Majestic Dell was a 1973 black stallion who earned 49 halter points and was a multiple world and reserve world champion sire.

== Death and legacy ==
Eternal Sun lived on the Howard farm for almost 20 years. Eternal Sun died at the age of 27 in 1985 and was buried on the farm next to a statue of him constructed in his honor. His headstone, erected by Howard, reads, "Here lies the horse that changed my life". Eternal Sun was inducted into the Michigan Quarter Horse Association Hall of Fame in 1989. Harold Howard died on August 8, 2008.

== Pedigree ==
Pedigree of Eternal Sun
Sire Eternal War bay 1944 Thoroughbred	Eternal Bull Thoroughbred	Bull Dog Thoroughbred
Sire Eternal War bay 1944 Thoroughbred	Eternal Bull Thoroughbred	Rose Eternal Thoroughbred
Sire Eternal War bay 1944 Thoroughbred	Red Haze Thoroughbred	Man O War Thoroughbred
Sire Eternal War bay 1944 Thoroughbred	Red Haze Thoroughbred	Golden Haze Thoroughbred
Dam Sierra Glitter sorrel 1950 Quarter Horse	Silver King P-183 bay 1937 Quarter Horse	Old Sorrel P-209 Quarter Horse
Dam Sierra Glitter sorrel 1950 Quarter Horse	Silver King P-183 bay 1937 Quarter Horse	Clegg Mare No 3
Dam Sierra Glitter sorrel 1950 Quarter Horse	Diamond Villiant sorrel 1934 Quarter Horse	Cap 2
Dam Sierra Glitter sorrel 1950 Quarter Horse	Diamond Villiant sorrel 1934 Quarter Horse	Valiant Mare
