= Joe Heim =

Horse trainer and clinician

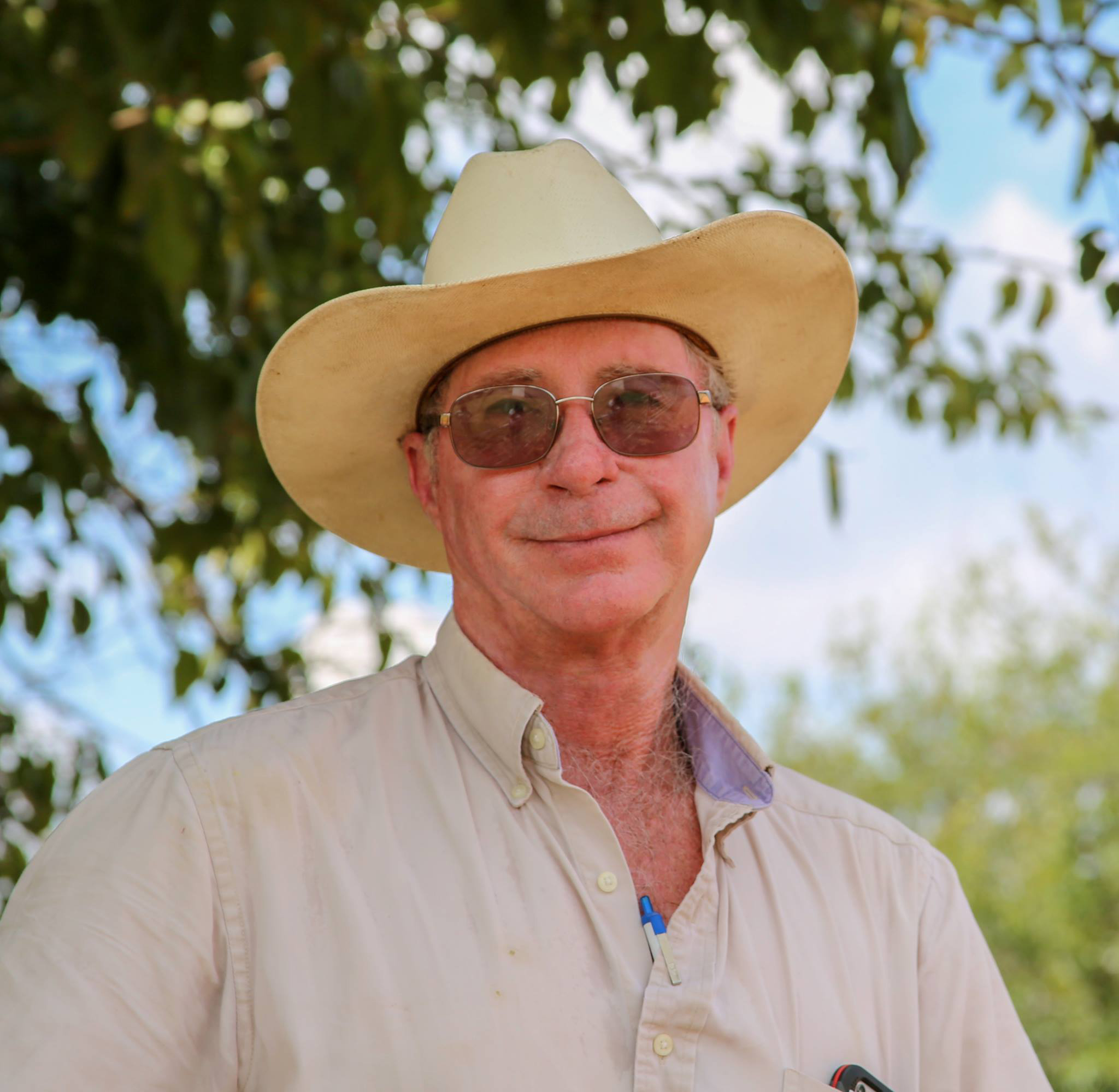
- September 2016
- Occupation: Horse trainer
- Discipline: NCHA cutting AQHA performance horses National Reining Horse Association (NRHA)
- Born: 1949
- Spouse(s): Holly
- Major wins/Championships: 1981 NCHA Futurity Open, and the NCHA Triple Crown including the 1983 NCHA Futurity Open, 1984 NCHA Super Stakes Open, 1984 NCHA Derby Open
- Lifetime achievements: NCHA Rider Hall of Fame

Significant horses
- Colonel Lil, Docs Okie Quixote

Joe Heim (born 1949) is a horse trainer and clinician residing in Thackersville, Oklahoma. He trains primarily Quarter Horses in various disciplines of western riding, including reining and cutting. He was inducted into the NCHA Rider Hall of Fame and is most notable for training and showing Docs Okie Quixote to win the 1983—1984 NCHA Triple Crown which included winning the 1983 NCHA Futurity, 1984 NCHA Derby and 1985 NCHA Super Stakes. Docs Okie Quixote was a 1980 AQHA stallion sired by Doc Quixote and out of the mare Jimmette Too by Johnny Tivio. He sired only one crop of foals before he died in 1985. His Triple Crown earnings totaled US$335,095.00, and his NCHA Lifetime Earnings totaled US$599,109.00.

Heim also won the 1981 NCHA Futurity riding Colonel Lil sired by Colonel Freckles, and in 1991 won the National Reining Horse Association Limited Open riding Okie Paul Quixote.

== Early years ==
Joe was born to Ethel Doyle and Cyril Heim (1920—2012). Cyril was a lifelong Kentuckian who served in the US Army during World War II as an artillery-forward observer, 45th Division, and recipient of a Bronze Star and two Purple Hearts. Heim attributes the foundation of his success to his parents for affording him the opportunity to ride and show horses as a youth.
