= Breed registry =

List of animal species, subspecies or lineage

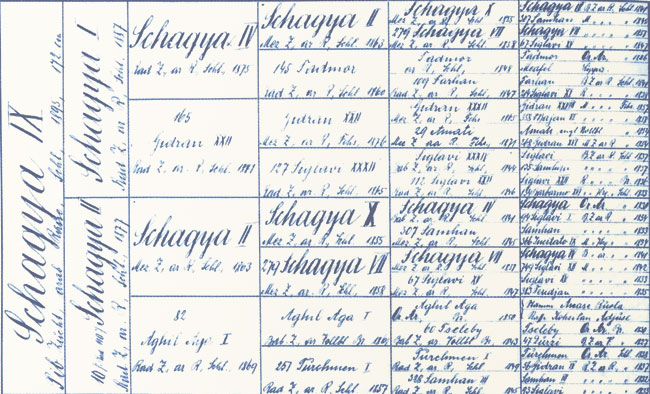
Pedigree chart of Shagya Arabian horse Shagya IX b. 1895

In animal husbandry, a breed registry, also known as a herdbook, studbook or register, is an official list of animals within a specific breed whose parents are known. Animals are usually registered by their breeders while they are young. The terms studbook and register are also used to refer to lists of male animals "standing at stud", that is, those animals actively breeding, as opposed to every known specimen of that breed. Such registries usually issue certificates for each recorded animal, called a pedigree, pedigreed animal documentation, or most commonly, an animal's "papers". Registration papers may consist of a simple certificate or a listing of ancestors in the animal's background, sometimes with a pedigree chart showing the lineage.

== Types of registries ==
There are breed registries and breed clubs for several species of animal, such as dogs, horses, cows and cats. The European Association of Zoos and Aquaria (EAZA) and the US Association of Zoos and Aquariums (AZA) also maintains stud books for captive species on display ranging from aardvarks to zebras.

Kennel clubs always maintain registries, either directly or through affiliated dog breed clubs. Some multi-breed clubs also maintain registries, as do non-affiliated breed clubs, and there are a few registries that are maintained by other private entities such as insurance agencies; an example of this in the United States is the Field Dog Stud Book. Working dog organizations also maintain registries.

There are also entities that refer to themselves as registries, but that are thinly veiled marketing devices for vendors of puppies and adult dogs, as well as a means of collecting registration fees from novice dog owners unfamiliar with reputable registries and breed clubs. Although these entities generally focus on dogs, particularly in relationship to the puppy mill industry, some are marketed as cat registries. At least one group claims to register wild species (held by private individuals rather than by legitimate zoological parks, which use the AZA).

Horse breeding also has such problematic registries, particularly for certain color breeds. While many color breeds are legitimate, some "registries" are primarily a marketing tool for poor quality animals that are not accepted for registration by more mainstream organizations. Other "registries" are marketing attempts to create new horse breeds, usually by breeders using crossbreeding to create a new type, but the animals are not yet breeding true.

Many such questionable registries are incorporated as for-profit commercial businesses, in contrast to the formal not-for-profit status of most reputable breed clubs. They may provide volume discounts for registrations by commercial dog breeders such as puppy mills. An unscrupulous registry for dogs or horses is often spotted by a policy to not require any proof of pedigree at all. In the dog world, such registries may not sponsor competitions and thus cannot award championship points to identify the best individuals registered within a particular breed or species. In the less-organized world of horse shows, where many different sanctioning organizations exist, some groups sponsor their own competitions, though wins at such events seldom carry much prestige in mainstream circles.

Some registers have the word "registry" in their title used in the sense of "list"; these entities are not registers in the usual sense in that they do not maintain breeding records. In the dog world, listed animals are required to be de-sexed. The American Mixed Breed Obedience Registry is an example. Some equestrian organizations create a recording system for tracking the competition records of horses, but, though horses of any sex may be recorded, they also do not maintain breeding or progeny records. The United States Equestrian Federation is one organization that uses such a system.

== Closed stud book ==
A closed stud book is a stud book or breed registry that does not accept any outside blood. The registered animals and all subsequent offspring trace back to the foundation stock. This ensures that the animal is a purebred member of the breed. In horses, an example of a closed stud book is that of the Thoroughbred, with a stud book tracing to 1791. The American Kennel Club is an example of a kennel club with primarily closed books for dogs; it allows new breeds to develop under its Foundation Stock Service (FSS), but such dogs are not eligible for competition in AKC conformation shows, although they do compete at those shows in the FSS category. For the breed to move to the Miscellaneous class and then to fully recognized status, the breed's stud book must be closed.

A closed stud book allows the breed to stay very pure to its type, but limits its ability to be improved. For instance, in performance disciplines, an animal that is successful in competitions is generally worth more than one that is pure. It also limits the gene pool, which may make certain undesirable characteristics become accentuated in the breed, such as a poor conformational fault or a disease.

Some closed stud books, particularly for certain European breeds such as the Finnhorse and the Trakehner, may also have a set of studbook selection criteria where animals must meet either a conformation standard, a performance standard, or both.

== Open stud book ==
In an open stud book, animals may be registered even if their parents or earlier ancestors were not previously registered with that particular entity. Usually an open stud book has strict studbook selection criteria that require an animal to meet a certain standard of conformation, performance or both. This allows breeders to modify breeds by including individuals who conform to the breed standard but are of outside origin. Some horse breeds allow crossbreds who meet specific criteria to be registered. One example is the semi-open stud book of the American Quarter Horse, which still accepts horses of Thoroughbred breeding, particularly via its appendix registry. Among dogs, an example of an open stud book would be the registries maintained by the American Kennel Club as its Foundation Stock Service. In some cases, an open stud book may eventually become closed once the breed type is deemed to be fully set.

In some agricultural breeds, an otherwise closed registry includes a grading up route for the incorporation of cross-bred animals. Often such incorporation is limited to females, with the progeny only being accepted as full pedigree animals after several generations of breeding to full-blood males. Such mechanisms may also allow the incorporation of purebred animals descended from unregistered stock or of uncertain parentage.

More controversial open stud books are those where there are few, if any qualifications for animals other than a single trait, such as a "color breed," particularly when the color is not a true-breeding characteristic. However, some breeds have a standard color or color preference that is one criterion among others used to register animals.

=== Appendix registries ===
Some open or partly open registries may permit animals who have some but not all qualifications for full registration to nonetheless be entered in a preliminary recording system often called an "appendix" registry. The most notable is that of the American Quarter Horse Association, which allows part-Thoroughbred/part-Quarter Horse foals to be recorded and shown, with full registration allowed after the horse achieves a set performance or merit standard akin to that of a merit registry. Other appendix registries are seen in certain color breeds of horses, such as the Appaloosa, American Paint Horse, and American Cream Draft Horse, where foals with the proper pedigree for registration but do not meet the color standard for the breed, yet may still carry the necessary genetics in a minimally-expressed form, may be registered and bred to fully registered animals, with ensuing offspring eligible for registration if they meet the breed standard.

=== Performance or merit ===
Another form of open registry is a registry based on performance or conformation, called in some societies Registry on Merit. In such registries, an eligible animal that meets certain criteria is eligible to be registered on merit, regardless of ancestry. In some cases, even unknown or undocumented ancestry may be permitted.

The Registry on Merit or ROM may be tied to percentage of bloodline, conformation, or classification or may be based solely on performance.

In the horse world, many warmblood breed organizations require a conformation and performance standard for registration, and often allow horses of many different breeds to qualify, though documented pedigrees are usually required. Some breed registries use a form of ROM in which horses at certain shows may be sight classified. For example, at qualifying shows in Australia, winning horses of stock-type breeding receive points for conformation, which are attested to by the judges and recorded in an owner's special book. The points are accumulated to eventually result in a Registry on Merit.

Registry on Merit is prevalent with sheepdog registries, in particular those of the Border Collie, and some other breeds with a heavy emphasis on working ability. In this type of ROM, the dog's conformation and ancestry generally does not matter.

== Papers ==
Breed registries usually issue certificates for each recorded animal, called a pedigree, pedigreed animal documentation, or most commonly, an animal's "papers". Registration papers may consist of a simple certificate or a listing of ancestors in the animal's background, sometimes with a pedigree chart showing the lineage. Usually, there is space for the listing of successive owners, who must sign and date the document if the animal is gifted, leased or sold. Papers transferred upon sale of an animal may be submitted to the registry in order to update the ownership information, and in most cases, the registry will then issue a new set of papers listing the new owner as the proper owner of the horse. Genuine papers are often identifiable as containing the registered name and number of the individual animal and its date of birth, the name of the attesting organization, with the logo if there is one, the name and signature of the registrar or other authorized person, and a corporate stamp or seal.

Documentation usually included on registration certificates or papers includes:

- name of sire or stud (father) and dam (mother)
- names of other ancestors, to the number of generations required by the issuing organization
- identifiable markings
- name, address and registered number of the breeder (often defined as the owner of the female at the time of the animal's conception or birth)
- name and address of the original owner who registered the juvenile
- details of originating litter
- health test results of ancestors

Registration papers are sometimes used as certificates of title.

== Crossbreeding and backbreeding ==
In some registries, breeders may apply for permission to crossbreed other breeds into the line to emphasize certain traits, to keep the breed from extinction or to alleviate problems caused in the breed by inbreeding from a limited set of animals. A related preservation method is backbreeding, used by some equine and canine registries, in which crossbred individuals are mated back to purebreds to eliminate undesirable traits acquired through the crossbreeding.

== Registered names and naming traditions ==
Naming rules vary according to the species and breed being registered. For example, show horses have a registered name, that is, the name under which they are registered as a purebred with the appropriate breed registry, and purebred dogs intended for the sport of conformation showing must be registered with the kennel club in which they will compete; and although there are no specific naming requirements, there are many traditions that may be observed in naming.

Along with a registered name, these animals often also have a simpler "pet name" known as a call name for dogs or a stable name for horses, which is used by their owners or handlers when talking to the animal. For example, the famous Thoroughbred race horse Man o' War was known by his stable name, "Big Red." The name can be anything that the animal's owner prefers. For example, the dog that won the 2008 Westminster show (US) was named K-Run's Park Me In First, with the call name of "Uno".

Dogs in the breed registry of a working dog club (particularly herding dogs) must usually have simple, no-nonsense monikers deemed to be "working dog names" such as "Pal", "Blackie", or "Ginger". The naming rules for independent dog clubs vary but are usually similar to those of kennel clubs.

The registered name often refers directly or indirectly to the breeder of the animal. Traditionally, the breeder's kennel prefix forms the first part of the dog's registered name. For example, all dogs bred at the Gold Mine Kennels would have names that begin with the words "Gold Mine". Horse breeders are usually not required to do this, but often find it to be a good form of commercial promotion to include a stable name or farm initials in the horse's name. For example, Gold Mine Stables may name give all horses names with the prefix "Gold Mine", "GM", or "GMS". The Jockey Club, which registers Thoroughbreds in Great Britain, requires stable names to be registered, but does not require their use in animal names.

Many dog breeders name their puppies sequentially, based on litter identification: Groups of puppies may be organized as Litter A, Litter B, and so on. When this is done, the names of all the puppies in litter A start with the letter "A," then "B" for litter B and so on. Horse breeders, especially in Europe, sometimes use the first letter of the dam's name as the first letter in the name of all of her offspring. Other breeders may use the same first letter to designate all the foals born on the farm in a given year.

Some breeders create a name that incorporates or acknowledges the names of the sire, dam or other forebears. For example, the famous cutting horse Doc O'Lena was by Doc Bar out of Poco Lena, a daughter of Poco Bueno. Some names are a little less direct: 2003 Kentucky Derby winner Funny Cide was by Distorted Humor out of Belle's Good Cide, and the famous race horse Native Dancer was by Polynesian out of Geisha.

Other breeders use themes. For example, a more imaginative breeder at the Gold Mine Kennels might name all the puppies of one litter after green precious stones: Gold Mine Emerald, Gold Mine Jade, and Gold Mine Peridot. Names for a subsequent litter might start with the adjectives describing precious stones: Gold Mine Sparkle, Gold Mine Brilliance, and Gold Mine Chatoyant. Breeders may be as creative or as mundane as they wish.

In order to minimize the unwieldiness that long and fancy names can bring, registries usually limit the total number of characters and sometimes number of separate words that may compose the animal's registered name. They are often prohibited from using only punctuation or odd capitalization to create a unique name; names are often published in all capitals on registration papers. Breeders are generally not allowed to use any name that may be obscene or misleading, such as the word 'champion' in a name, a trademark, or anything that can be mistaken for the name of another kennel or, sometimes, stable. Only after an animal has achieved a legitimate championship will some registries permit the use of the prefix Ch., or other title before or after their registered name. Some registries may use symbols to designate the status of certain individuals. An asterisk * may be used to designate an animal born in another country and imported. A plus + may be used to designate a champion or an animal under special registration status.

== See also ==
- List of cattle herd books
- Cat registry
- Dog breeding
- Horse breeding
- Kennel club
- Selective breeding
- Inbreeding
- Coefficient of relationship
- Pet naming
