= Futurity =

A Futurity is a reference to a future occurrence. It may also refer to:

- Future
- Futurity (horse competition), equestrian competition for younger horses, such as specific horse races, wherein they must be nominated well in advance of the actual competition.
- Futurity, Colorado, a community in the United States
- Dr. Futurity, a novel by Philip K. Dick
- Futurity Stakes (disambiguation), horse races with this title
- MV Futurity, a British ship
- Futurity (website), a nonprofit site that features the latest discoveries by scientists at top research universities
- Futurity (musical), a 2012 album and musical by The Lisps
