= Hereditary equine regional dermal asthenia =

Genetic disease in Quarter Horses, Appaloosas, and Paint Horses

Hereditary equine regional dermal asthenia (HERDA), also known as hyperelastosis cutis (HC), is an inherited autosomal recessive connective tissue disorder. It develops from a homozygous recessive mutation that weakens collagen fibers that allow the skin of the animal to stay connected to the rest of the animal. Affected horses have extremely fragile skin that tears easily and exhibits impaired healing. In horses with HC, the skin separates between the deep and superficial dermis. There is no cure. Most affected individuals receive an injury they cannot heal, and are euthanized. Managed breeding strategy is currently the only option for reducing the incidence of the disease.

The disease is found primarily in the American Quarter Horse, specifically in cutting horse lines. Affected horses have been found to trace to the stallion Poco Bueno, or possibly, farther back to one of his ancestors. Researchers have now named four deceased Quarter Horse stallions that were carriers and produced at least one affected HERDA foal; they are Dry Doc, Doc O'Lena, Great Pine, and Zippo Pine Bar. These stallions all trace to Poco Bueno through his son and daughter Poco Pine and Poco Lena. Other breeds affected are the American Paint Horse, and the Appaloosa and any other breed registry that allows outcrossing to AQHA horses.

HERDA is characterized by abnormal skin along the back that tears or rips easily and heals into disfiguring scars. The skin is loose, and hyper-elastic in affected horses. This collagen based abnormality affects their heart valves too and their mechanical properties are found to be inferior to native horses. Symptoms typically don’t appear until the horse is subjected to pressure or injury on their back, neck or hips, usually around two years of age. However foals can show signs when injured, while other horses mature and only show signs in the joints. The expression of HERDA is variable, and the phenotypic range of expression is still being determined.

After being tested, the results either show "normal", "carrier" or "affected" and can be determined by DNA testing of either a blood or hair sample.

- N/N — Normal: does not have the HERDA gene
- N/HRD- Carrier: carries one copy of the gene
- HRD/HRD- Affected: has two copies of the gene

The expected lifespan of an affected horse is 2–4 years. There is currently no cure for this disease. To prevent it from occurring, the only solution is not to breed horses who both carry the HERDA allele.

== History ==
The disease first was recognized in 1971. Research of affected animals indicated that 95% of the identified HERDA horses have traced back to Poco Bueno on both sides of the pedigree. Some also trace to his full brother, Old Grand Dad. The remaining 5% trace to King, the sire of both horses. This may suggest that Poco Bueno could have inherited the HC mutation from his sire, with the possibility that the condition goes even further back. It is difficult to trace the condition further because no pedigrees to date completely distinguish between the lines of Poco Bueno's sire, King, and his dam, Miss Taylor; even if full records existed, it would be difficult to verify them due to their age.

A disease consistent with HERDA/HC was described in the scientific literature in 1988 documenting two related affected Quarter Horses. Researchers at Mississippi State University described a separation of the upper and lower dermis associated with a loose packing of collagen fibrils in a one-year-old filly with hyperelastosis cutis. In 2004, clinical veterinarians at the University of California, Davis first coined the term hereditary equine regional dermal asthenia (HERDA) after examining 50 horses with stereotypical presentation of the disease. Shortened and thinned collagen fibrils in the deep dermis was the significant characteristic shared among the affected skin of diseased horses.

Throughout the years, closely breeding back, or inbreeding, to the lines of Poco Bueno increased the frequency of homozygousity in the population, thus increasing the number of affected animals. The 2004 Quarter Horse News Stallion Register revealed that of the top 100 cutting horse stallions, 14 are known HERDA carriers. Today, approximately 28% of all horses of cutting horse bloodlines are carriers of HERDA.

Using DNA from the UC Davis clinical collection of HERDA samples, collaborating UC Davis geneticists searched for discreet areas of DNA that were homozygous, or identical by descent, uniquely in affected horses. UC Davis first reported successful preliminary mapping in January 2004. Additional work verified the disease was inherited, rather than caused solely by environmental insult, and strongly indicated an autosomal recessive mode of inheritance. In January 2007, UC Davis presented their findings at the Plant and Animal Genome Conference Equine Workshop indicating the ability to identify horses that carry HERDA. A full accounting of this work, detailing the mapping and identification of a mutation in the gene coding for peptidylprolyl isomerase B, was published on May 11, 2007. Concurrent with publication of these results, the Veterinary Genetics Laboratory at UC Davis began offering a genetic test to identify carriers of the disease allele.

In the spring of 2007, researchers working independently at Cornell University and at the University of California, Davis announced that a DNA test for HERDA had been developed. Over 1,500 horses were tested during the development phase of the test, which was initially available to the general public through both institutions. A United States patent for the HERDA test was issued to UC Davis on October 27, 2009.
