= Doc O'Lena =

Quarter Horse show stallion and sire

- Breed: Quarter Horse
- Discipline: Cutting
- Sire: Doc Bar
- Grandsire: Lightning Bar
- Dam: Poco Lena
- Maternal grandsire: Poco Bueno
- Sex: Stallion
- Foaled: 1967
- Died: 1993
- Country: United States
- Color: Bay
- Breeder: Dr. and Mrs. Stephen F. Jensen
- Owner: Dr. and Mrs. Stephen F. Jensen

Other awards
- 1970 NCHA Futurity Champion

Honors
- American Quarter Horse Hall of Fame

Doc O'Lena (1967–1993) was a Quarter Horse stallion, a champion cutting horse and a sire of champion cutting horses. He was inducted into both the AQHA and NCHA Halls of Fame, as was his dam Poco Lena. He was the 1970 NCHA Futurity Open Champion, followed by his full brother, Dry Doc, who won the title in 1971. As a sire, Doc O'Lena earned recognition as the first futurity champion to sire a futurity champion when Lenaette won the title in 1975. He also sired Smart Little Lena, the first horse to win the NCHA Triple Crown.

== Background ==
Doc O'Lena was foaled in 1967, sired by Doc Bar and out of the mare Poco Lena. He is one of only two horses in the American Quarter Horse Hall of Fame with both parents also inductees; the other is Easy Jet. His color was bay, and his only markings were a small star on his head, and a small white half pastern on his left hind foot. He was bred and owned by Dr. and Mrs. Stephen F. Jensen of Paicines, California at the time of registration.

== Career ==
The Jensens had hoped to sell Doc O'Lena as a yearling to cutting horse trainer, Don Dodge. Dodge had purchased Doc O'Lena's dam in 1953 from E. Paul Waggoner's Three D Stock Farm in Arlinton, TX., and had successfully shown her to win numerous AQHA and NCHA awards and titles. After seeing Doc O'Lena, Dodge concluded that he was too small to be a cutting horse, and passed on the offer. The Jensens decided to keep Doc O'Lena and get him into the hands of a professional trainer. They contacted Shorty Freeman who, in 1968, was hauling for the NCHA World Championship title showing King Skeet for Adrian Berryhill. On his way to the San Francisco Cow Palace, Freeman stopped by the Jensen's to look at Doc O'Lena. Freeman wasn't concerned about the yearling's small size, and agreed to take him for training.

During an interview, Freeman recalled the first time he tried to ride Doc O'Lena as a green broke, long yearling and the colt ran off with him. He said, "I didn't think running off belonged to him, so that didn't really bother me." Referencing Poco Lena he said, "Besides, I knew what the old mare was, so I wanted to ride him." He also said, "I didn't train Doc O'Lena anyway, he trained himself. I knew about 30 days after I got him that he was an exceptional horse... I always had to ride him last in the training program, 'cause if I didn't, I'd be mad at all the other horses in the barn. He was just that good."

In April 1970, Adrian Berryhill partnered with Freeman and they purchased Doc O'Lena from the Jensens for $15,000. In December that same year, Freeman rode Doc O'Lena to win the NCHA Futurity, and "became the first competitors to make a clean sweep of the futurity's preliminary go-rounds, semi-finals and finals", winning $17,357 for his new owners. Doc O'Lena's NCHA lifetime earnings totaled $21,991.93, and he had also earned an NCHA Certificate of Ability.

== Breeding career and honors ==
Doc O’Lena sired 1,310 foals: 321 were AQHA point earners having accumulated 3,978.5 points; 87 earned Registers of Merit in performance events (also 9 amateur, 3 youth); 9 earned Superior performance awards; 4 were world champions; 6 were youth world champions; and 4 were reserve world champions.

Among Doc O'Lena's offspring were Doc Athena, Sugar Olena, Lenas Peppy, Smart Little Lena, and Todaysmyluckyday. His son Montana Doc is a member of the NCHA Hall of Fame. Doc O'Lena was the first NCHA Futurity winner to sire a Futurity winner when Lenaette won the Futurity in 1975. His son Smart Little Lena was the first winner of the NCHA triple crown. And in 1978, Doc O'Lena himself was syndicated for $2.1 million, at that time a record for the cutting horse industry.

Doc O'Lena was inducted into the AQHA Hall of Fame in 1997.

== Sire line tree ==
- Doc O'Lena
  - Lena's Peppy
  - Doc Athena
  - Montana Doc
  - Tanquery Gin
  - Shorty Lena
  - Smart Little Lena
    - Smart Chic Olena
      - A Chic In Time
      - Smart Spook
        - Custom Spook
        - Red Stripe Spook
        - Shine N Spook
        - Spooks N Jewels
      - Chics Magic Potion
      - Olena Oak
        - Dual Oak E
      - Collen All Chics
      - Travelin Jonez
    - Very Smart Remedy
      - Smart Luck
      - Very Shiney
      - Smart Medicine Man
      - Very Black Magic
  - Sugar Olena
  - Travelina
  - CD O'Lena
  - Mr Sun O'Lena
  - Todaysmyluckyday

== Pedigree ==
Percentage (TB)
Three Bars (TB)
Myrtle Dee (TB)
Lightning Bar
Doc Horn (TB)
Della P
mare by Old DJ
Doc Bar
My Texas Dandy
Texas Dandy
Streak
Dandy Doll
Bartender II
Bar Maid F
Nelly Bly
Doc O'Lena
Zantanon
King P-234
Jabalina
Poco Bueno
Old Poco Bueno
Miss Taylor
mare by Hickory Bill
Poco Lena
Dodger
Pretty Boy
Little Maud
Sheilwin
Blackburn
mare by Blackburn
Waggoner Ranch mare
