= Dry Doc =

Quarter Horse show stallion and sire

- Breed: Quarter Horse
- Discipline: Cutting
- Sire: Doc Bar
- Dam: Poco Lena
- Sex: Stallion
- Foaled: 1968
- Country: United States
- Color: Bay
- Breeder: Dr. and Mrs. Stephen F. Jensen

Dry Doc (1968–1997) was an AQHA registered American Quarter Horse stallion by Doc Bar and the second as well as the last foal of the champion cutting mare Poco Lena. Dry Doc was a cutting horse and sire of cutting horses.

== Life ==
Foaled in 1968, Dry Doc was by Doc Bar, and the second and last foal of the champion cutting mare Poco Lena. He was a full brother to Doc O'Lena. Dry Doc was inducted into the NCHA Hall of Fame in 1980, joining ranks with his dam and full brother. Dry Doc was inducted into the Michigan Quarter Horse Association Hall of Fame in 1997. Dry Doc was a bay, bred and owned by Dr. and Mrs. Stephen F. Jensen of Paicines, California at the time of registration.

== Pedigree ==
Percentage (TB)
Three Bars (TB)
Myrtle Dee (TB)
Lightning Bar
Doc Horn (TB)
Della P
mare by Old DJ
Doc Bar
My Texas Dandy
Texas Dandy
Streak
Dandy Doll
Bartender II
Bar Maid F
Nelly Bly
Dry Doc
Zantanon
King P-234
Jabalina
Poco Bueno
Old Poco Bueno
Miss Taylor
mare by Hickory Bill
Poco Lena
Dodger
Pretty Boy
Little Maud
Sheilwin
Blackburn
mare by Blackburn
Waggoner Ranch mare
