= French Flash Hawk =

American quarter horse

- Breed: Quarter Horse
- Discipline: Barrel racing
- Sex: gelding
- Foaled: 1987
- Died: May 4, 2016 (aged 28–29)
- Country: United States
- Color: Sorrel (horse)
- Owner: Kristie Peterson

Honors
- ProRodeo Hall of Fame

French Flash Hawk (1987–May 4, 2016), nicknamed Bozo, won four consecutive barrel racing champion titles with his owner, Kristie Peterson. He was inducted into the ProRodeo Hall of Fame in 2018. He was one of the mostly widely known rodeo animal athletes of his time.

== Early life ==
French Flash Hawk, nicknamed Bozo, was born in 1987. He was a sorrel gelding Quarter Horse with a white blaze down his face. When Bozo was two years old, Peterson bought him for $400 from her neighbor Mike Hatfield. She came home with Bozo on Thanksgiving Day of 1989. Her husband Chuck gelded the stallion prior to letting Peterson start him. According to Peterson, Bozo's nickname originated from a circus from the sire of his dam's name.

At first, Bozo was considered an "outlaw" when ridden in the feedlot. However, a bond between horse and woman formed quickly. She understood his need for independence and that he was more than a rodeo competitor. She believed he was meant to do the things he did. He did not require much human attention, but he did love running the barrels. Any attention he needed was with Peterson.

== Career ==
Peterson started out her barrel racing career with Bozo in aged events, something she had not tried before. In her first two years at futurities and derbies in 1991 and 1992, she earned almost $150,000. In December 1992, Bozo won the Barrel Futurities of America World Championship Derby and Sweepstakes. She did a little bit of competition with the Women's Professional Rodeo Association (WPRA) in 1991, after buying her WPRA card. She earned the first of 11 Mountain States Circuit titles. “He did really well in the futurities but at five, in the derbies, he was just awesome", Peterson remembers. "At first I thought he was a really nice horse, a good placer, but soon I figured out he was a winner."

Peterson first started serious competition with Bozo as a WPRA competitor in 1993. The events were held by the Professional Rodeo Cowboys Association (PRCA) rodeo circuit. She had a major win at the National Western Stock Show in Denver, Colorado, a win at Cheyenne Frontier Days, and a win at the Dodge City Roundup throughout the summer season.

When the time came for her first National Finals Rodeo (NFR) in 1993, she just barely missed winning the world championship barrel riding title. She finished a close second, almost upsetting Charmayne James and her horse Scamper during their 10th championship year at the National Finals Rodeo (NFR). The duo won two rounds. However, a tipped barrel in round nine was the cause of their loss of the title. Nonetheless, fans took to the new barrel racing team, due to the horse's style and Peterson's humility, especially her quickness to credit her horse.

The NFR was held by this time at the Thomas & Mack Center in Las Vegas, Nevada. In 1994, they won the NFR championship, and went on to win three more years, 1996, 1997, and 1998.

From 1996 to 1997, the duo never missed a check. From 1995 to 1997, Bozo placed in 22 consecutive rounds. In 1998, he missed a check in the first round. After that, he went 17 rounds without missing a check. The duo earned more than one half million in their career.

== Awards ==
- 1992, 1994, 1995, 1998 RAM (formerly Dodge) National Circuit Rodeo titles
- 1993, 1995, 1999 Reserve World Barrel Racing Champion
- 1994, 1995, 1996, 1997, 1998 NFR Average titles
- 1994, 1995, 1996, 1997 World Barrel Racing Champion

- 1995, 1996, 1997, 1998 Horse With the Most Heart
- 1995, 1996, 1997, 1998, 1999 PRCA/WPRA AQHA Barrel Racing Horse of the Year
- 2020 Cheyenne Frontier Days Hall of Fame

== Death and legacy ==
In 1993, after Peterson won her third championship at RodeoHouston, she retired Bozo. It was on May 4, 2016, in Peterson's home in Lott, Texas, that Bozo died at the age of 29 years. Peterson valued Bozo as more than just a barrel horse; she considered him part of the family. Bozo is also credited with changing the sport due to the way he ran barrels: many barrel horses of the time were trained to turn barrels off their hind ends, then slide around turns. Bozo, on the other hand, would pull with his front end and power through the turn with his hind end. This gave him success in all kinds of barrel organizations and terrain. Bozo's success had breeders interested in his pedigree. His sire, Sun Frost, had two sons that particularly became well known and desired: Frenchmans Guy and PC Frenchmans Hayday. Frenchmans Guy is the No. 2 leading sire of barrel horses. He produced winners of almost $10 million. Bozo's records, his bloodlines, and his style, are all reasons that he was one of the most recognized barrel horses, perhaps even one of the most recognized rodeo animal performers, of his time.

== Pedigree ==
French Flash Hawk, nicknamed Bozo, is by Sun Frost out of Casey's Charm who is a daughter of Tiny Circus. His granddam was Casey's Ladylove, American Quarter Horse Hall of Fame inductee by the American Quarter Horse Association in 2017.

Lightning Bar
Doc Bar
Dandy Doll
Docs Jack Frost
War Chant
Chantella
Bardella
Sun Frost
Driftwood
Driftwood Ike
Hancock Belle
Prissy Cline
Super Charge
Josephine El
Webbs Demon
French Flash Hawk
Anchor Watch
Tiny Watch
Clabber Tiny
Tiny Circus
Willow Bars
Circus Bars
Honey III
Caseys Charm
Poco Dun
Caseys Poco
Miss Casey
Caseys Ladylove
MC Rusty
Lady Diane
Chigger Barnes
