= Eternal Sunshine =

Eternal Sunshine may refer to:

- Eternal Sunshine (album), by Ariana Grande, 2024
  - "Eternal Sunshine" (song), the title song of the album
- Eternal Sunshine, a 2005 album by Kelly Chen
- "Eternal Sunshine", a song by Jhené Aiko from the 2014 album Souled Out
- Eternal Sunshine of the Spotless Mind, a 2004 film
  - Eternal Sunshine of the Spotless Mind (soundtrack)

== See also ==
- Act 1: Eternal Sunshine (The Pledge), a 2007 mixtape by Jay Electronica
- Eternal Sun, an American quarter horse
- Midnight sun
