= NCHA Horse Hall of Fame =

The NCHA Horse Hall of Fame was established by the National Cutting Horse Association (NCHA) to recognize the accomplishments of outstanding cutting horses based on their lifetime earnings in NCHA approved championship cutting horse competition. Initially, when a horse had won $35,000 in NCHA Open Championship competition, a Gold certificate was issued to the owner of the horse, and a plaque in recognition of that achievement was mounted on a designated wall inside NCHA headquarters. As purses and divisions grew over the years, the following amendments were made to the earnings requirement for a horse to qualify:

- 1980 amended to $50,000
- 1981 amended to $100,000
- 1985 amended to $150,000
- 1989 amended to $200,000
- 1991 amended to $150,000

In addition to their Horse Hall of Fame, the NCHA established the following: NCHA Members Hall of Fame, Non-Pro Hall of Fame, NCHA Rider Hall of Fame, Youth Hall of Fame and Horse of the Year.

== Hall of Fame honorees ==
S=stallion; M=mare; G=gelding

Name of horse	Year foaled	Year died	Sex	Sire	Dam	Owner	City	State
A Little Bossy	2005		G	CD Lights	Pistol Smart	Karen & Gary Fields	Weatherford	TX
Alice Star	1953		M	Saltillo	Little Red Alice	Houston Clinton	Burnett	TX
Annie Glo	1963		M	King Glo	Chickasha Ann	Bridget May	Wichita Falls	TX
Auspicious Cat	2005		S	High Brow Cat	Lenas O Lady	Dos Cats Partners	Gainesville	TX
Autumn Boon	1994		M	Dual Pep	Royal Blue Boon	Karen Freeman	Gainesville	TX
Ball O'Flash	1973		G	Happy Flit Bar	89er's Flasher	Connie Sue Ashcraft	Decatur	TX
Bayou Shorty (DNA)	1991		G	Shorty Lena	Peppy Star Rio	Don & Kathy Boone	West Columbia	TX
Belles n Bullets	2002		G	Smart Lil Ricochet	Santa Belle	Don & Kathy Boone	West Columbia	TX
Bet Yer Blue Boons	1990		M	Freckles Playboy	Royal Blue Boon	Lindy Burch	Weatherford	TX
Bob Acre Doc	1981		S	Son Ofa Doc	Sapps Sandy	Susan Cardwell	Houston	TX
Booger Red	unknown	unknown	unknown	Traveler	unknown	Manual Kulwin	Chicago	IL
Boon San Kitty	Year foaled	Year died	Sex	Sire	Dam	Walton's Rocking W Ranch	Milsap	TX
Cash Quixote Rio	Year foaled	Year died	Sex	Sire	Dam	Kobie Wood & Heiligbrodt Int.	Stephenville & Houston	TX
CD Olena	Year foaled	Year died	Sex	Sire	Dam	Bar H Ranch	Weatherford	TX
Charoaketer Eyes	Year foaled	Year died	Sex	Sire	Dam	Mike & Carol Sanders	Zolfo Springs	FL
Chickasa Dan	Year foaled	Year died	Sex	Sire	Dam	Casey Cantrell	Nara Vista	NM
Chico Gann	Year foaled	Year died	Sex	Sire	Dam	Andy Nored	Bowie	TX
Chiquita Pistol	Year foaled	Year died	Sex	Sire	Dam	Wallace (Tooter) Dorman	Oakwood	TX
Christys Acre	Year foaled	Year died	Sex	Sire	Dam	Robert & Andrea Finger	Houston	TX
Copaspeto	Year foaled	Year died	Sex	Sire	Dam	Don & Kathy Boone	West Columbia	TX
CR Sun Reys	Year foaled	Year died	Sex	Sire	Dam	Center Ranch	Centerville	TX
Delta	Year foaled	Year died	Sex	Sire	Dam	George Price	Fairview	TN
Doc N Willy	Year foaled	Year died	Sex	Sire	Dam	Edward B. Jones	Redding	CA
Doc Per	Year foaled	Year died	Sex	Sire	Dam	Darrell Habben	Aubrey	TX
Doc Wilson	Year foaled	Year died	Sex	Sire	Dam	Dr. Elvin D. Blackwell	Dallas	TX
Doc's Marmoset	Year foaled	Year died	Sex	Sire	Dam	Tom Lyons	Phoenix	AZ
Doc's Oak	Year foaled	Year died	Sex	Sire	Dam	Tom Lyons	Phoenix	AZ
Doc's Play Mate	Year foaled	Year died	Sex	Sire	Dam	Leon Harrel	Helm	CA
Doc's Starlight	Year foaled	Year died	Sex	Sire	Dam	Lee Holsey	Corsicana	TX
Docs Okie Quixote	Year foaled	Year died	Sex	Sire	Dam	Joe Heim	Thackerville	OK
Docs Otoetta	Year foaled	Year died	Sex	Sire	Dam	John H & Nancie Paxton	Millsap	TX
Dolly Brian	Year foaled	Year died	Sex	Sire	Dam	R. L. "Sonny" Chance	Houston	TX
Donas Suen Boon	Year foaled	Year died	Sex	Sire	Dam	Paula Rogers Wood	Stephenville	TX
Don't Look Twice	Year foaled	Year died	Sex	Sire	Dam	Louis & Corliss Baldwin	Fort Worth	TX
Dry Doc	Year foaled	Year died	Sex	Sire	Dam	M.L. Chartier	Fair Haven	MI
Dry N Freckled	Year foaled	Year died	Sex	Sire	Dam	Tom & Nancy Loeffler	San Antonio	TX
Dual Rey Me	Year foaled	Year died	Sex	Sire	Dam	Candace & Jeremy Barwick	Stephenville	TX
Fizzabar	Year foaled	Year died	Sex	Sire	Dam	Don Dodge	Marysville	CA
Gandy's Time	Year foaled	Year died	Sex	Sire	Dam	Jim Lee	Iowa Park	TX
George C Merada	Year foaled	Year died	Sex	Sire	Dam	Furst Ranch	Bartonville	TX
Gun Smokes Wimpy	Year foaled	Year died	Sex	Sire	Dam	Debbie Patterson	Tecumseh	OK
Handle Bar Doc	Year foaled	Year died	Sex	Sire	Dam	Jim Eddings	Athens	TX
Harriott Playgirl	Year foaled	Year died	Sex	Sire	Dam	Lee Garner	Batesville	MS
Heart 109	Year foaled	Year died	Sex	Sire	Dam	Sonny Braman	Shaker Heights	OH
Hicapoo	Year foaled	Year died	Sex	Sire	Dam	Jim Milner	Southlake	TX
High Brow CD	Year foaled	Year died	Sex	Sire	Dam	Grace Ranch Inc.	Jennings	LA
Hollywood Cat	Year foaled	Year died	Sex	Sire	Dam	Louis Dorfman	Dallas	TX
Hollywood Lin	Year foaled	Year died	Sex	Sire	Dam	David & Jan Gage	Wichita Falls	TX
Hoppen	Year foaled	Year died	Sex	Sire	Dam	Del Jay Associates	OH & Wichita Falls	TX
Hydrive Cat	Year foaled	Year died	Sex	Sire	Dam	Shane & Jane Plummer	Fort Worth	TX
Im Countin Checks	Year foaled	Year died	Sex	Sire	Dam	Kyle Manion	Aubrey	TX
Jae Bar Fletch	Year foaled	Year died	Sex	Sire	Dam	Ernest Cannon	Houston	TX
Jazzote	Year foaled	Year died	Sex	Sire	Dam	George W. Glover	Bay City	TX
Jose Uno	Year foaled	Year died	Sex	Sire	Dam	John Bradford	Gadsden	AL
Junie Wood	Year foaled	Year died	Sex	Sire	Dam	Glade Knight	Weatherford	TX
Just Playin Smart	Year foaled	Year died	Sex	Sire	Dam	Ralph Gray	Fort Worth	TX
Kingstream	Year foaled	Year died	Sex	Sire	Dam	David Gage	Wichita Falls	TX
Little Badger Dulce	Year foaled	Year died	Sex	Sire	Dam	Lonnie D & Barbara Allsup	Clovis	NM
Little Pepto Cat	Year foaled	Year died	Sex	Sire	Dam	Jim & Mary jo Milner	Southlake	TX
Little Pepto Gal	Year foaled	Year died	Sex	Sire	Dam	Robert Kingsley	Weatherford	TX
Little Tenina	Year foaled	Year died	Sex	Sire	Dam	Dan J & Sallee Craine	Fort Worth	TX
Little Tom Wing	Year foaled	Year died	Sex	Sire	Dam	Don Strain	White River	SD
Lynx Melody	Year foaled	Year died	Sex	Sire	Dam	Bette Cogdell	Tulia	TX
Marbo McCue	Year foaled	Year died	Sex	Sire	Dam	Jimmie Orrell	Monticello	AR
Marion's Girl	Year foaled	Year died	Sex	Sire	Dam	Marion Flynt	Midland	TX
Merada Clone	Year foaled	Year died	Sex	Sire	Dam	Ed & Kathy Blakely	Benton	LA
Meradas Little Sue	Year foaled	Year died	Sex	Sire	Dam	William & Corinne Heiligbrodt	Houston	TX
Metallic Cat	Year foaled	Year died	Sex	Sire	Dam	Alvin Fluts	Amarillo	TX
Metallic Rebel	Year foaled	Year died	Sex	Sire	Dam	Thomas L. Guinn	Philadelphia	MS
Meteles Cat	Year foaled	Year died	Sex	Sire	Dam	Cody Hedlund	Lipan	TX
Miss Elite	Year foaled	Year died	Sex	Sire	Dam	Gabe McCall	Aurora	CO
Miss Nancy Bailey	Year foaled	Year died	Sex	Sire	Dam	Bob Burton	Arlington	TX
Miss Silver Pistol	Year foaled	Year died	Sex	Sire	Dam	Wes & Anna Shahan	Pleasanton	TX
Mny Peppy Star Rio	Year foaled	Year died	Sex	Sire	Dam	Mike & Nancy Young	Baird	TX
Moms Stylish Player	Year foaled	Year died	Sex	Sire	Dam	Robert Tregemba	Lawrence	KS
Montana Doc	Year foaled	Year died	Sex	Sire	Dam	Gene Suiter	Los Olivas	CA
Mr Holey Sox	Year foaled	Year died	Sex	Sire	Dam	J.T. Fisher	Bridgeport	TX
Mr San Peppy	Year foaled	Year died	Sex	Sire	Dam	Agnew & Welch, Lessee (King Ranch)	Kingsville	TX
MS Peppy Cat	Year foaled	Year died	Sex	Sire	Dam	Lonnie & Barbara Allsup	Clovis	NM
NRR Cat King Cole	Year foaled	Year died	Sex	Sire	Dam	North Ridge Ranch	Pierre	SD
Nu I Wood	Year foaled	Year died	Sex	Sire	Dam	Crystal Creek Ranch	Aledo	TX
Oh Cay Felix	Year foaled	Year died	Sex	Sire	Dam	Pat & Laura Collins	Lincoln	IL
One Time Choice	Year foaled	Year died	Sex	Sire	Dam	J Five Horse Ranch	Weatherford	TX
Our Little Dyno	Year foaled	Year died	Sex	Sire	Dam	Jeff & Margaret McCoy	Weatherford	TX
Patty Conger	Year foaled	Year died	Sex	Sire	Dam	E.H. Moorers	Richmond	VA
Peponita	Year foaled	Year died	Sex	Sire	Dam	Matlock & Carol Rose	Gainesville	TX
Peppy San	Year foaled	Year died	Sex	Sire	Dam	Douglas Lake Cattle Company, Ltd	Douglas Lake	BC, Canada
Peppy San Badger	Year foaled	Year died	Sex	Sire	Dam	King Ranch	Kingsville	TX
Peppymint Twist	Year foaled	Year died	Sex	Sire	Dam	Katsy & John Mecom	Houston	TX
Playboy Olena	Year foaled	Year died	Sex	Sire	Dam	Wayne Long	Decatur	TX
Playboys Madera	Year foaled	Year died	Sex	Sire	Dam	Kay Floyd	Stephenville	TX
Poco Lena	Year foaled	Year died	Sex	Sire	Dam	Skipper Cattle Company	Orange	TX
Poco Mona	Year foaled	Year died	Sex	Sire	Dam	Orange Rice Milling Company	Orange	TX
Poco Quixote Rio	Year foaled	Year died	Sex	Sire	Dam	Delena K Barrett	Meridan	MS
Poco Stampede	Year foaled	Year died	Sex	Sire	Dam	Mrs. G.F. Rhodes	Abilene	TX
Quintan Blue	Year foaled	Year died	Sex	Sire	Dam	Marvine Ranch	Meeker	CO
Quixote Mac	Year foaled	Year died	Sex	Sire	Dam	Dave & Beverly Behnan	Chesterfield	MO
Red White and Boon	Year foaled	Year died	Sex	Sire	Dam	Jim Milner	Southlake	TX
Redneck Yachtclub	Year foaled	Year died	Sex	Sire	Dam	Philip E & Mary Ann Rapp	Weatherford	TX
Rey Down Sally	Year foaled	Year died	Sex	Sire	Dam	Tom Bailey	Carbondale	CO
Rey Lynx	Year foaled	Year died	Sex	Sire	Dam	Paige Alexander-Loera	Krum	TX
Reys Desire	Year foaled	Year died	Sex	Sire	Dam	H.B. Barlett	Pike Road	AL
Reyzin	Year foaled	Year died	Sex	Sire	Dam	Gale Force Quarter Horses	Conway	SC
Reyzin The Cash	Year foaled	Year died	Sex	Sire	Dam	Iron Rosse Ranch	Carbondale	CO
Rosies Lena	Year foaled	Year died	Sex	Sire	Dam	Donald Mullins	New Ulm	TX
Royal Chess	Year foaled	Year died	Sex	Sire	Dam	Clyde Bauer	Victoria	TX
Royal Hank	Year foaled	Year died	Sex	Sire	Dam	Larry Shearin	Creve Ceour	MO
San Tule Uno	Year foaled	Year died	Sex	Sire	Dam	Mike & Libby Bowman	Simpsonville	KY
Sandhill Charlie	Year foaled	Year died	Sex	Sire	Dam	Slim Trent	Fallon	NV
Senor George	Year foaled	Year died	Sex	Sire	Dam	Senor George Enterprises	Mt. Clemons	MI
Shakin Flo	Year foaled	Year died	Sex	Sire	Dam	Sandra W Bonelli	Petaluma	CA
Shania Cee	Year foaled	Year died	Sex	Sire	Dam	Bette Cogdell	Tulia	TX
Short Doc	Year foaled	Year died	Sex	Sire	Dam	Judy Venezia	Scotch Plains	NJ
Sister CD	Year foaled	Year died	Sex	Sire	Dam	Skip Queen	Lipan	TX
Skeeter	1941	Year died	G	TB Horse	Appendix QH Mare (1937)	Phillip Williams	Tokio	TX
SL Jaybird	Year foaled	Year died	Sex	Sire	Dam	R.L. & Mica Chartier	Weatherford	TX
Slats Dawson (Dawson's Slats)	Year foaled	Year died	Sex	Sire	Dam	George J. Pardi	Uvalde	TX
Smart Lil Scoot	Year foaled	Year died	Sex	Sire	Dam	S & S Farms	Shreveport	LA
Smart Little Lena	Year foaled	Year died	Sex	Sire	Dam	Smart Little Lena Syndicate	Aubrey	TX
Smart Peppy Lena (P)	Year foaled	Year died	Sex	Sire	Dam	Don & Kathy Boone	West Columbia	TX
Smooth As A Cat	Year foaled	Year died	Sex	Sire	Dam	Kyle Manion	Aubrey	TX
Smooth Asa Zee	Year foaled	Year died	Sex	Sire	Dam	Mary Jo Milner	Southlake	TX
Snappy Dun	Year foaled	Year died	Sex	Sire	Dam	Edgar R. Brown	Fort Pierce	FL
Snipper W	Year foaled	Year died	Sex	Sire	Dam	Primo Stables	Victoria	TX
Sonitalena	Year foaled	Year died	Sex	Sire	Dam	Willy & Jane Richardson	Brownwood	TX
Special Nu Baby	Year foaled	Year died	Sex	Sire	Dam	Guy & Shannon Barker	Madill	OK
Spots Hot	Year foaled	Year died	Sex	Sire	Dam	Wesley & Kristen N Gaylean	Claremore	OK
Stardust Desire	Year foaled	Year died	Sex	Sire	Dam	Douglas Lake Cattle Co, Ltd	Douglas Lake	BC, Canada
Stylish Martini	Year foaled	Year died	Sex	Sire	Dam	Dottie Hill	Glen Rose	TX
Sugar Vaquero	Year foaled	Year died	Sex	Sire	Dam	Sandie Currie & Glendon Johnson's (Brazos Bend Ranch)	Houston	TX
Swen Miss 16	Year foaled	Year died	Sex	Sire	Dam	L.M. White	Chiefland	FL
Tap O Lena	1990	2015	M	Doc OLena	Tapeppyoka Peppy	Philip E & Mary Rapp	Weatherford	TX
Tenino San	Year foaled	Year died	Sex	Sire	Dam	Bob & Patsy Brooks	Whitesboro	TX
Third Cutting	Year foaled	Year died	Sex	Sire	Dam	Carl & Shawnea Smith	Jacksboro	TX
Vegas Boy	Year foaled	Year died	Sex	Sire	Dam	Walt Gardner	Las Vegas	NV
Wood I Never	Year foaled	Year died	Sex	Sire	Dam	Wrigley Ranches LLC	Weatherford	TX
Woody Be Lucky	Year foaled	Year died	Sex	Sire	Dam	Dan & Karen Hansen	Nampa	ID
