= Carol Harris =

American Quarter Horse trainer (1923–2021)

Carol Harris (March 26, 1923 – August 7, 2021) was an American Quarter Horse Hall of Fame horsewoman. Harris made her way into a self-proclaimed "good ol' boy" industry. She was one of the first women American Quarter Horse Association's (AQHA) judges. She judged at the AQHA World Championship Show, the first woman to do so.

== Life ==
Carol Harris was born on March 26, 1923, in New Jersey. She spent her childhood in West Orange, New Jersey. Around 1930, Harris was focusing her time on horses, dogs, cats, and other animals she was interested in. But it was the horses and dogs that she chose to breed, train, and show. Harris had horses as a child, and her first was a Standardbred. The standardbred was a pacer that she turned into a trotter. Harris also showed Hackney ponies, Arabians, Saddlebreds, and Tennessee Walkers.

Harris graduated from Westover School in 1941. Her father rewarded her with a trip to California and Arizona. She saw an American Quarter Horse for the first time on a stopover to a rodeo in Phoenix, Arizona. She noted that "I immediately recognized the Quarter Horse as being really exceptional – elegant, yet powerful." In 1945, Harris married, which resulted in three children.

== Career ==
As her friends kept working with hunters and jumpers, she started buying quarter horses. She grew to having about 30 quarter horses and discovering cutting. She became the president of the East Coast Cutting Horse Association.

In the 1950s she started showing Quarter Horses. Harris moved her farm to Reddick, Florida, in 1963, and started Bo-Bett Farm. She soon turned that 400-acre facility into what has been labeled a "Quarter Horse Camelot."

In the late 1960s, Harris's mare, Judy Dell, kickstarted her business. She was a granddaughter of American Quarter Horse Hall of Fame member Poco Bueno. Judy Dell's first foal, Eternal Dell, by Eternal Sun, became the farm's first stallion. Eternal Dell sired the stallion Majestic Dell who sired nine AQHA champions.

In 1982, she bought a colt named Rugged Lark. "Reining, dressage, driving, hunter, pleasure horse, Breyer model, sire, bronze statue, Silver Spur winner, AQHA Superhorse, philanthropist. That was Rugged Lark." He was inducted into the American Quarter Horse Hall of Fame in 2006.

== Death ==
Harris died on August 7, 2021. She was 98 years old. Harris was at home when she died from complications of cancer.

She made her mark upon the equestrian world in many ways, including breeding, judging, and holding the president position at several equine associations.
