= NCHA =

NCHA may refer to:

- National Cultural Heritage Administration, an administrative agency subordinate to the Ministry of Culture and Tourism of the People's Republic of China.
- Northern Collegiate Hockey Association
- National Cutting Horse Association
