= Pine Johnson =

Quarter Horse trainer

James Lewis "Pine" Johnson (October 14, 1915 – February 26, 1990), was an American Quarter Horse trainer best known for training cutting horses Poco Bueno, Poco Lena and Jesse James.

== Background ==
Pine Johnson was born to Una Culbert and William Welborn Johnson near the city, of Seymour, Texas.

In 1945, Johnson started working for E. Paul Waggoner at his 3D Stock Farm in Arlington, Texas.
