= Kaweah Bar =

Quarter Horse racehorse

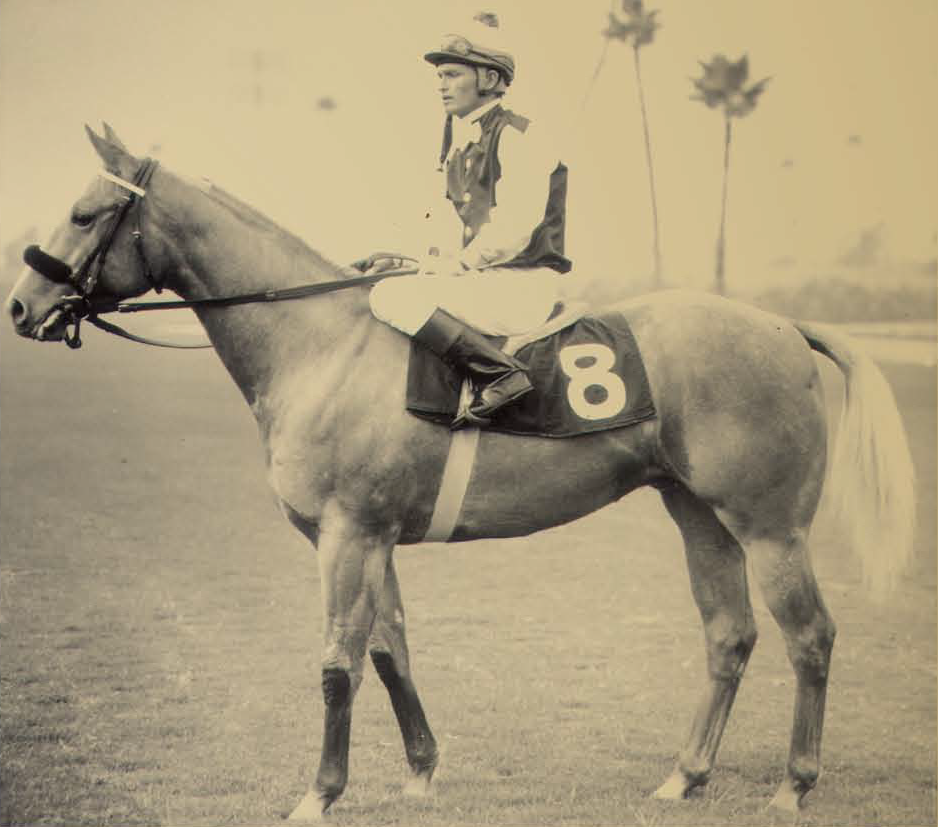
- Breed: Quarter Horse
- Discipline: Racing
- Sire: Alamitos Bar
- Grandsire: Three Bars (TB)
- Dam: Angie Miss
- Maternal grandsire: Go Man Go
- Sex: Gelding
- Foaled: 1966
- Country: United States
- Color: Palomino
- Breeder: Hadan Livestock Company
- Owner: George Chittick

Record
- 101 starts: 36-17-12; SI-102

Earnings
- $374,577.00

Awards
- 1968 & 1970 World Champion Quarter Running Horse; 1969 & 1971 & 1972 Champion Quarter Running Gelding

Honors
- American Quarter Horse Hall of Fame

Known as the Palomino Express, Kaweah Bar (1966 - 1976) racked up impressive stats on the Quarter Horse racetracks.

== Life ==
Kaweah Bar was the son of Alamitos Bar and out of Angie Miss. Alamitos Bar was a son of Three Bars (TB). Kaweah Bar's dam was a daughter of Go Man Go.

== Racing career ==
From 101 starts in eight years, Kaweah Bar won thirty-six races, coming in second seventeen times and third twelve times. He earned an American Quarter Horse Association (or AQHA) Race Register of Merit with his highest Speed Index of 102. He earned 273 racing points from the AQHA, entitling him to the title of Superior Race Horse. He was named the World Champion Quarter Running Horse in both 1968 and 1970, with Champion Quarter Running Gelding titles in 1969, 1971 and 1972. In total, he earned $374,577.00 on the racetrack.

== Post racing career and death ==
His owner retired him from the track and he was sold as a chariot horse. In late 1976, he died in a trailer accident. Los Alamitos Race Course in Los Alamitos, California, holds the Kaweah Bar Handicap annually to honor the horse.

== Honors ==
Kaweah Bar was inducted into the AQHA Hall of Fame in 1998.
