= List of cattle herd books =

This is a list of cattle herd books (breed registries) recognised as authoritative for their breed.

== List ==
Breed	Book	Publisher
Aberdeen-Angus	Aberdeen Angus Herd Book	Aberdeen Angus Cattle Society
Aberdeen-Angus	New Zealand Aberdeen-Angus Herd Book	New Zealand Aberdeen-Angus Cattle Breeders' Association
Aberdeen-Angus	Irish Angus Herd Book	Irish Angus Cattle Society Ltd.
Africander	Africander Cattle Herd Book	The Africander Cattle Breeders' Society
Alderney	Herd Book of the Bailiwick of Alderney	Royal Alderney Agricultural Society
Ayrshire	Ayrshire Herd Book	Ayrshire Cattle Herd Book Society of Great Britain and Ireland
Belted Galloway	Belted Galloway Herd Book	Belted Galloway Cattle Society
Galloway	Galloway Herd Book	Galloway Cattle Society of Great Britain and Ireland
Devon	Davy's Devon Herd Book	Devon Cattle Breeders' Society
Dexter	Dexter Herd Book	Dexter Cattle Society
Guernsey	English Guernsey Herd Book	English Guernsey Cattle Society
Guernsey	Herd Book of the Bailiwick of Guernsey (Guernsey Branch)	Royal Guernsey Agricultural Society
Hereford	Herd Book of Hereford Cattle	Hereford Herd Book Society
Highland	Highland Herd Book	Highland Cattle Society of Scotland
Holstein-Friesian	Friesch Rundvee-Stamboek
Holstein-Friesian	Nederlandsch Rundvee-Stamboek
Holstein-Friesian	Holstein UK Herd Book	Holstein UK
Jersey	Jersey Herd Book	Royal Jersey Agricultural and Horticultural Society
Jersey	Jersey Herd Book of the United Kingdom	Jersey Cattle Society of the United Kingdom
Kerry	British Kerry Cattle Herd Book	British Kerry Cattle Society
Kerry	Kerry Cattle Herd Book	Royal Dublin Society
Lincoln Red	Lincoln Red Herd Book	Lincoln Red Cattle Society
Miniature Jersey	Purebred Mini Jersey Herd Book	Purebred Mini Jersey Society
Red Danish	Stambog over Koer af Rod Dansk Malkerace	De Samvirkende Danske Landboforeninger
Red Poll	Red Poll Herd Book	Red Poll Cattle Society of Great Britain and Ireland
Shorthorn	Coates's Herd Book	Shorthorn Society of Great Britain and Ireland
South Devon	Herd Book of South Devon Cattle	South Devon Herd Book Society
Simmental	Irish Simmental Cattle Society	Irish Simmental Cattle Society Ltd
Sussex	Sussex Herd Book	Sussex Herd Book Society
Welsh	Welsh Black Cattle Herd Book	Welsh Black Cattle Society
