= Michigan Quarter Horse Association Hall of Fame =

Hall of Fame for Quarter Horses and people connected to the Quarter Horse

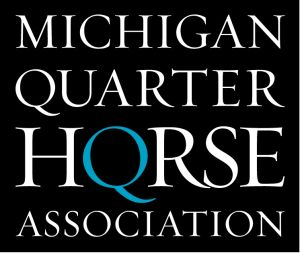
- Established: late 1980s
- Location: 11630 14 Mile Road NE #300; Rockford, Michigan 49341
- Coordinates: 43°7′20″N 85°33′32″W
- Type: Hall of fame
- Website: MQHA.com

The Michigan Quarter Horse Association Hall of Fame was founded in the late 1980s to honor individuals and horses from the US state of Michigan. The intent of this hall of fame is to recognize those who have made significant contributions to the Association and have impacted the Quarter Horse breed.

== Inductees ==
| Year | Inductee | Ref |
|---|---|---|
| 2021 | Kim and Shelley Donovan | |
| 2020 | Rick and Julie Leek | |
| 2019 | William Bayne | |
| 2018 | Colleen, Gary & Bobby Miller | |
| 2017 | Theodore Lincoln | |
| 2016 | George & Sandy McCrumb | |
| 2015 | Hedy Levin | |

== Horses ==
| Year | Horse | Owner | Ref |
|---|---|---|---|
| 2021 | Sonny Sassy Brat and Coolsie | | |
| 2020 | Cierra Zacharia | | |
| 2019 | Quincys Lil Feature | Barbara Stremler | |
| 2018 | Mae Major Mito | | |
| 2017 | Tailored to Taste | | |
| 2016 | Mr Tabano Bay | | |
| 2015 | Paleface Doll | | |
| 2014 | Don't Gamble | | |
| 2013 | Wilee Stuff | | |
| 2012 | He's Just To Sharp | | |
| 2011 | Mito Cierra | | |
| 2010 | Zippo Jack Bar | | |
| 2009 | Scotch Margarita | | |
| 2008 | Petite Lord | | |
| 2007 | Silent Skip | | |
| 2006 | To Sleepy Too | | |
| 2005 | Custus Jaguar | | |
| 2004 | Dont Skip Charlie | | |
| 2003 | Pannars Pride | | |
| 2002 | Moolah Blue | | |
| 2001 | Eternal Linda | | |
| 2000 | Mr. Conclusion | | |
| 1999 | Dell Tommy | | |
| 1998 | Bidda Flash | | |
| 1997 | Dry Doc | | |
| 1996 | Saved the Day | | |
| 1995 | April Five | | |
| 1994 | Fancy Joe Boy | | |
| 1994 | Dodgers Playboy | | |
| 1993 | Pine Pretty | | |
| 1993 | Heavy Red | | |
| 1992 | The Redeemer | | |
| 1992 | 2021 | | |
| 1991 | Chuck Wagon W | | |
| 1990 | Whimpy III | | |
| 1990 | After Dark | | |
| 1989 | Evans Flag | | |
| 1989 | Eternal Sun | | |
| 1988 | The Whipple Horses | | |
| 1988 | Iron Hand | | |
| 1988 | Bay Fiddle | | |
