= NCHA Derby =

Aged event in cutting horse competition

The NCHA Derby is the final jewel in the National Cutting Horse Association's Triple Crown; the first being the NCHA World Championship Futurity followed by the NCHA Super Stakes. The NCHA Derby is open to 4-year-old horses of all breeds, and offers two divisions: the Open and Non-Professional. The Derby is held as one of the main events during the NCHA Summer Spectacular at Will Rogers Memorial Coliseum in Fort Worth, Texas.
