= Rugged Lark =

Quarter Horse show horse and sire

- Breed: Quarter Horse
- Discipline: Western Pleasure; Hunter Under Saddle; Trail; Pleasure driving Reining
- Sire: Really Rugged (TB)
- Grandsire: Rough'n Tumble (TB)
- Dam: Alisa Lark
- Maternal grandsire: Leolark
- Sex: Stallion
- Foaled: May 1, 1981
- Died: October 26, 2004
- Country: United States
- Color: Bay
- Breeder: Teresa Striegel
- Owner: Carol A. Harris

Other awards
- AQHA Performance Register of Merit; AQHA Superior Western Pleasure Horse; AQHA Superior Hunter Under Saddle Horse; AQHA Superior Trail Horse; 1985 & 1987 AQHA World Show Superhorse; 1985 World Champion Pleasure Driving Horse; 1987 World Champion Senior Hunter Under Saddle Horse; 1987 Reserve World Champion Senior Western Riding Horse; 1987 Reserve World Champion Pleasure Driving Horse

Honors
- American Quarter Horse Hall of Fame

Rugged Lark (May 1, 1981 – October 26, 2004) was Quarter Horse stallion who was a two-time American Quarter Horse Association (or AQHA) World Show Superhorse as well as being a three-time AQHA World Champion. He is also the winner of the Silver Spur Award

== Life ==
Rugged Lark was the son of a Thoroughbred stallion Really Rugged and out of a Quarter Horse mare named Alisa Lark. Alisa Lark was a great-granddaughter of Leo and a great-great-granddaughter of both King P-234 and Joe Hancock P-455.

== Show career ==
Rugged Lark won the AQHA World Show Superhorse title in 1985 and in 1987. He also was an AQHA Superior Western Pleasure Horse, Superior Hunter Under Saddle Horse, and Superior Trail Horse. In 1987 he was the World Champion Senior Hunter Under Saddle Horse. In 1985 he was the World Champion Pleasure Driving Horse. He earned AQHA points in Hunter Under Saddle, Western Pleasure, Trail, Hunter Hack, Reining, Working Hunter, Western Riding, Pleasure Driving, and Barrel Racing.

== Breeding record ==
Among Rugged Lark's offspring are The Lark Ascending, Rugged Painted Lark, Look Whos Larkin – 1999 AQHA World Show Superhorse, Jolena Lark, Rugged Lark II and Forever a Lark. He is one of only two stallions to sire other offspring to win superhorse titles.

== Death and honors ==
Rugged Lark was euthanized in October 2004 due to colic.

Rugged Lark was inducted into the AQHA Hall of Fame

== Pedigree ==
Questionnaire (TB)
Free For All (TB)
Pansy (TB)
Rough'n Tumble (TB)
*Bull Dog (TB)
Roused (TB)
Rude Awakening (TB)
Really Rugged (TB)
*Challenger II (TB)
Errard (TB)
*Ruddy Light (TB)
Ruddy Belle (TB)
Sir Damion (TB)
Harriet's Kid (TB)
Liz F (TB)
Rugged Lark
Leo
Lemac
Sorrel Sue
Leolark
King Bob
Tallulah
Daisy K
Alisa Lark
Joe Hancock Jr
Pelican
Covella (TB)
Aliso Gill 3
Snicker
Snicker Girl
Okie Girl

== See also ==
- List of historical horses
