= Futurity (horse competition) =

Races for younger horses

A futurity for horses is a competition, usually limited to younger horses, which offers significant prize money to winners, generated in part from fees paid to nominate, maintain eligibility, and enter the final competition. In most cases, a horse will only compete against other horses of the same age.

Typically, to be eligible, a horse usually must be entered in a specific competition well in advance. Sometimes a nomination is made several months ahead of time, at the beginning of a competition year, but often a horse must be nominated as a foal, or even prior to birth. The owners of the horse make periodic payments to keep the animal eligible for the futurity competition, then pay a final entry fee to actually compete. Purses are usually larger than other, similarly situated non-futurity races.

In some cases, horses may be nominated later than the usual deadline, but the owner of the horse must pay an extra fee to do so. If a horse is sold between the time of nomination and the competition, the nomination usually stays with the horse so long as the new owner continues to make eligibility payments.

== Purpose ==
The purpose of futurities in general is to identify and promote the best young horses in a given discipline. Futurities are common in performance disciplines such as horse racing, as well as in sport horse competition for jumpers and dressage horses. They are also seen in western-style events such as barrel racing, reining, and cutting. Various horse breed registries also offer futurity events to encourage breeding and development of young horses across multiple events open to a specific breed.

In the UK, a program designed to develop the best young horses in that nation for Olympic-level disciplines uses a futurity system from foaling year through age five. Nominees are evaluated at the beginning of the competition year and monitored throughout the season. Owners of these horses have access to expert nutrition and veterinary advice as part of the program. Competition does not begin until later in the summer to allow late-developing horses a fair chance in competition with their age cohort. Horses are thoroughly evaluated and developed to succeed from local amateur to international levels.

== Types ==
Futurity competitions for horses include the following.

- A horse race, usually for two-year-old horses. Multiple horse races carry variants on the name "Futurity Stakes." Similar races for three-year-olds are called a Derby, the best known being the Kentucky Derby in the US and the original “Derby”, the Epsom Derby in the UK.
- A stock horse competition for young performance horses, usually offering various events for horses from three- to six- years old. The National Reining Horse Association holds a large futurity every year, as do the National Cutting Horse Association and the National Reined Cow Horse Association. These futurities often offer purse money well into the tens of thousands to various event winners.
- Barrel racing competition for horses usually ranging in age between three and five years, but must be in their first year of competition.
- Breeders' futurities, in various equestrian disciplines, limited to horses sired by stallions that have been nominated for the program. In some cases, the owner of a nominated stallion may also be awarded a percentage of the prize money won by that horse's offspring.
- ”Sweepstakes” futurities, offered for various horse show events. Horses are usually nominated in utero, as foals, or at the beginning of a specific competition year, with continued eligibility payments required thereafter. Nominated horses may compete in more than one event depending on their age, training and continued eligibility. Younger horses such as yearlings are shown in hand in halter competition; adult horses are usually ridden in specific classes, usually offered for horses between ages two through four or five years of age, depending on breed and event. The largest of these events is held at the Quarter Horse Congress, but similar events exist for other horse breeds such as the American Saddlebred, Arabian, and others.
- Performance futurities, often a type of breeders' futurity, often seen in sport horse disciplines open to all breeds. Horses are nominated and then compete in a series of events, earning points throughout the year. At the end of the year, the top performers are given awards and additional prize money. As a horse matures, it may be entered in subsequent events for similarly aged or trained horses.

== Criticism ==
Futurities are sometimes criticized for asking too much of young horses, too soon. The debate centers around whether the intense training required can harm the long-term welfare of the horse. Some organizations have responded by moving certain competitions from spring to autumn to allow young horses more time to mature. In other cases, debate rages over allowing young horses one more year before their major performance competition. Some breeders prefer earlier events for younger horses because of reduced expenses and less time before a profitable sale. In contrast, horse trainers, under pressure to produce quick results and often criticized for doing so, also want horses with career longevity.
