= Futurity (website) =

Nonprofit science news website

- Website type: News aggregator
- Available in: English
- Website: www.futurity.org
- Launched: 15 September 2009; 17 years ago

Futurity is a nonprofit website that aggregates news articles about scientific research conducted at prominent universities in the United States, the United Kingdom, Canada, Europe, Asia, and Australia. It is hosted and edited by the University of Rochester.

== History ==
Futurity was established in 2009 by a group of thirty-five research universities, including Stanford University. The site's co-founders were Lisa Lapin, Michael Schoenfeld, and Bill Murphy, who were then affiliated with Stanford University, Duke University, and the University of Rochester, respectively. A beta version of the site was launched in March 2009, with the site officially launching on September 15 of that year. The site's founding was born out of the increasing difficulty faced by universities in publicizing their research through traditional news outlets. Murphy explained that the site would be distinct from science-oriented wire services like Eurekalert! in that its target audience would be the general public, rather than professional journalists. Founding editor Jenny Leonard, also of the University of Rochester, noted that the site is not strictly a journalism website, telling the Columbia Journalism Review's Curtis Brainard, "It wasn’t meant to be a replacement for the type of reporting and analysis which is so essential to covering science and research completely." By 2011, the site had set up deals with the news aggregators Flipboard and LinkedIn Pulse to share Futurity's content on their platforms.

== Membership ==
Membership in Futurity was originally limited to the sixty-two members of the Association of American Universities. Member schools were also initially charged a $2,000 membership fee. Within two years, Futurity had nearly doubled its university membership from thirty-five to sixty. The site now also accepts members from the Russell Group, the Group of Eight, and the International Alliance of Research Universities.

== Content ==
Futurity's articles are based on press releases and other stories submitted to the site by the universities themselves. The articles are often written by the universities' public relations departments, and they are only lightly edited to increase their appeal to the general public before publication.

== Reactions ==
Earle Holland, the assistant vice president for research communications at Ohio State University, criticized Futurity in an article for the Winter 2009/2010 issue of ScienceWriters magazine. His specific criticisms of the site included that "The Futurity staff was allowed to alter the content of the research stories institutions submitted, based on their own discretion", and that "No one on the Futurity staff was an experienced science writer". Science journalist Charlie Petit told the San Jose Mercury News that although university press releases are a reliable source on which to base science stories, as Futurity does, they "...are completely absent any skepticism or investigative side." In an article published in Seed, Evan Lerner accused Futurity of "...blur[ring] the line between reporting and public relations". He also argued that "Futurity’s emphasis on presentation and social networking might help get science information in front of new sets of eyes, but it’s unlikely to bridge the gulf between experts and the scientifically illiterate."
