= NCHA Triple Crown =

Series of cutting competitions

The NCHA Triple Crown comprises three major cutting horse aged events beginning with the NCHA Futurity for 3-year-olds, followed by the NCHA Derby for 4-year-olds, and NCHA Super Stakes for 5-year-olds. All three events are held at the Will Rogers Coliseum in Ft. Worth, Texas. The culmination of prize money for all three events in 2008 was in excess of $10 Million, surpassing that of the Triple Crown of Thoroughbred Racing.

There have been only 3 NCHA Open Division Triple Crown winners and 1 NCHA NonPro Division Triple Crown winner since the inception of the NCHA in 1946:

- Smart Little Lena ridden by Bill Freeman (1982-1983) Open Division
- Docs Okie Quixote ridden by Joe Heim (1983-1984) Open Division
- Chiquita Pistol ridden by Tag Rice (2002-2003) Open Division
- Watch Me Whip ridden by Armando Costa Neto (2015-2016) NonPro Division
