= Poco Lena =

Quarter Horse show horse and broodmare

- Breed: Quarter Horse
- Discipline: Cutting
- Sire: Poco Bueno
- Grandsire: King P-234
- Dam: Sheilwin
- Maternal grandsire: Pretty Boy
- Sex: Mare
- Foaled: 1949
- Country: United States
- Color: Bay
- Breeder: E. Paul Waggoner
- Owner: E. Paul Waggoner, Don Dodge
- Trainer: Pine Johnson

Awards
- AQHA Performance Register of Merit; AQHA Champion; AQHA Superior Halter Horse; AQHA Superior Cutting Horse (1959,1960, 1961); AQHA High Point Cutting Horse (1959,1960,1961); NCHA World Champion Cutting Mare (1954, 1955, 1959, 1960, 1961); NCHA Reserve World Champion; NCHA Silver Award; NCHA Bronze Award

Honors
- NCHA Hall of Fame; American Quarter Horse Hall of Fame

Poco Lena (1949–1968) was an outstanding cutting mare, and dam of two famous Quarter horse cutting horses and stallions: Doc O'Lena and Dry Doc.

== Life ==
Poco Lena was foaled in 1949, the daughter of Poco Bueno out of a daughter of Pretty Boy named Sheilwin. She traced to Peter McCue on both her sire's and her dam's side.

== Career, breeding and honors ==
With the American Quarter Horse Association (or AQHA) Poco Lena earned her AQHA Championship, a Performance Register of Merit, a Superior Cutting Horse award and a Superior Halter Horse award. She was also the AQHA High Point Cutting Horse in 1959, 1960, and 1961. With the National Cutting Horse Association (or NCHA) she earned a total of $99,819.61 in cutting contests in her career. She earned a Certificate of Ability, as well as a Bronze and a Silver Award with the NCHA. She was also inducted into the NCHA Horse Hall of Fame.

In late 1961, Poco Lena foundered. She recovered, and was showing well when in October 1962 her owner, B. A. Skipper Jr., died in a plane crash. In the confusion, Poco Lena was left in a trailer for four days without food or water. She foundered again, and never competed again. Eventually she was bought by the owners of Doc Bar, Dr. and Mrs. Stephen Jensen. After much nursing and effort, Poco Lena produced two foals when bred to Doc Bar – Doc O'Lena and Dry Doc, both of whom won the NCHA Cutting Futurity. However, Poco Lena's founder deteriorated after the birth of Dry Doc, and on December 16, 1968, she was euthanized.

Poco Lena was inducted into the AQHA Hall of Fame.

== Pedigree ==
Little Joe
Zantanon
Jeanette
King P-234
Strait Horse
Jabalina
mare by Traveler
Poco Bueno
Little Joe
Old Poco Bueno
Virginia D
Miss Taylor
Hickory Bill
mare by Hickory Bill
unknown
Poco Lena
Harmon Baker
Dodger
Froggie
Pretty Boy
Tip
Little Maud
Bess
Sheilwin
Yellow Jacket
Blackburn
Siss
mare by Blackburn
unknown
Waggoner Ranch mare
unknown
