= Futurity Stakes =

Futurity Stakes are a type of horse race and may specifically refer to:

- Futurity Stakes (MRC), a horse race held at Caulfield Racecourse in Australia by the Melbourne Racing Club
- Coronation Futurity Stakes, Woodbine Racetrack in Toronto, Ontario, Canada
- Asahi Hai Futurity Stakes, a horse race held at Hanshin Racecourse in Japan
- Belmont Futurity Stakes, a horse race held at Belmont Park in the United States by New York Racing Association
- Los Alamitos Futurity, a horse race held at Los Alamitos Racetrack in the United States
- Breeders' Futurity Stakes, a horse race held at Keeneland Race Course in the United States
- Futurity Trophy, a Group One horse race two-year-olds at Doncaster Racecourse in Great Britain
- Futurity Stakes (Ireland), a horse race held at the Curragh Racecourse in Ireland
- Del Mar Futurity, held at Del Mar Racetrack, California
