= NCHA Super Stakes =

Aged event in cutting horse competition

The NCHA Super Stakes is the second jewel in the National Cutting Horse Association's annual Triple Crown. It is held in April following the November/December NCHA World Championship Futurity and a few months before the NCHA Derby, which is held during the summer in conjunction with the NCHA Summer Spectacular. The Super Stakes is an event for 4-year-old horses while the Super Stakes Classic is for 5- and 6-year-old horses. The event is limited to the offspring of stallions that were previously nominated by paying a subscription fee, the majority of which is added back to the million purse offered in prize money.
