= NCHA World Championship Futurity =

First aged event in cutting-horse competition

The NCHA World Championship Futurity (NCHA Futurity), originally established in 1962, is an annual cutting horse event, or limited age event, that is hosted by the National Cutting Horse Association (NCHA). It is the debut event for 3-year-old cutting horses, and the first jewel in the NCHA Triple Crown, which also includes the annual NCHA Super Stakes held in April, and the NCHA Derby held during the NCHA Summer Cutting Spectacular. Initially, the two main divisions of the NCHA Futurity were the Open and Non Pro, but over time an Amateur division was added.

As of 2022, owners are allowed to enter an unlimited number of eligible horses in the Open division. However, once the horses are named, a limit is placed on the number of horses a single rider can show. Both the Non Pro and Amateur are based on the rider, with limits on the number of horses they can show. The NCHA Futurity is traditionally held each year at Will Rogers Memorial Coliseum in Fort Worth, Texas, which has been the venue for the Futurity since its inaugural event in 1962.

The total Futurity purse in 2014 was $3.8 Million. Phil Hanson of Weatherford, Texas riding Classy CD Cat won the Open Championship and $200,000 in prize money plus other prizes that included a custom western saddle, a Jim Reno bronze trophy, boots, a leather recliner, and a gold buckle. In contrast, the total purse for the 2021 NCHA Futurity which was held November 17, 2021–December 11, 2021 was $4,160,381.80, with 2,379 Entries, and $600,000 in added money. John Mitchell riding "Janie Wood" won the Open, earning $241,340.31, and Christina Galyean Cox riding "Playful Metallic won the Non Pro, earning $63,186.87.
