= Doc Bar =

Quarter Horse show stallion and sire

- Breed: Quarter Horse
- Discipline: Halter; Cutting sire
- Sire: Lightning Bar
- Grandsire: Three Bars
- Dam: Dandy Doll
- Maternal grandsire: Texas Dandy
- Sex: Stallion
- Foaled: 1956
- Country: United States
- Color: Chestnut
- Breeder: Finley Ranches

Honors
- American Quarter Horse Hall of Fame
- Last updated on: January 11, 2008.

Doc Bar (1956–1992) was a Quarter Horse stallion that was bred to be a racehorse, became an outstanding halter horse, and in his sire career revolutionized the cutting horse industry.

== Life ==
Doc Bar was foaled in 1956, and his sire was Lightning Bar, a son of Three Bars (TB). His dam was Dandy Doll, a daughter of Texas Dandy. Dandy Doll's dam was a descendant of Joe Reed P-3.

== Offspring ==
Among Doc Bar's famous offspring are Doc O'Lena, Doc's Dee Bar, Doc's Oak, Dry Doc, Doc's Marmoset, Doc's Dandy Doll, Doc's Haida, Doc's Starlight, Handle Bar Doc, Doc's Prescription, and Doc's Play Mate. Among his grandget are Smart Little Lena, Lenas Peppy, Royal Mahogany, and Lynx Melody.

== Death and honors ==
Doc Bar died on July 20, 1992, and was buried on the Jensen/Ward Doc Bar Ranch in Paicines, California.

Doc Bar was inducted into the American Quarter Horse Association's (or AQHA) AQHA Hall of Fame in 1993. In 2007 Western Horseman magazine chose Doc as number two on their list of top ten ranch horse bloodlines.

== Sire line tree ==
- Doc Bar
  - Doc's Dee Bar
  - Doc O'Lena
    - Lena's Peppy
    - Doc Athena
    - Montana Doc
    - Tanquery Gin
    - Shorty Lena
    - Smart Little Lena
      - Smart Chic Olena
        - A Chic In Time
        - Smart Spook
        - Chics Magic Potion
        - Olena Oak
        - Collen All Chics
        - Travelin Jonez
      - Very Smart Remedy
        - Smart Luck
        - Very Shiney
        - Smart Medicine Man
        - Very Black Magic
    - Sugar Olena
    - Travelina
    - CD O'Lena
    - Mr Sun O'Lena
    - Todaysmyluckyday
  - Doc's Jack Frost
    - Quick Draw Cline
    - Sun Frost
      - PC Boy George
      - French Flash Hawk
      - Frenchmans Guy
        - French Wonder
        - French First Watch
        - Guys French Jet
        - Guys Six Pack To Go
        - Guys Best Effort
      - PC Frenchmans Hayday
  - Dry Doc
    - Dry Oil
    - Dry Clean
  - Doc's Lynx
    - Doc N Willy
    - Doc Egger
      - Biebers Oakie
        - An Oakie With Cash
  - Doc's Hickory
    - Hickory's King Duce
    - High Brow Hickory
    - Vyntage
  - Doc's Mahogany
    - Royal Mahogany
  - Doc's Oak
  - Doc's Prescription
  - Handle Bar Doc
  - Doc's Tomcat
  - Genuine Doc
    - Shining Spark
      - Bald N Shiney
      - Shine Like Hail
      - Just Gotta Shine
      - Shine By The Bay
      - Shiners Smart Chex
      - A Shiner Named Sioux
      - Shine On Line

== Pedigree ==
Midway (TB)
Percentage (TB)
Gossip Avenue (TB)
Three Bars (TB)
Luke McLuke (TB)
Myrtle Dee (TB)
Civil Maid (TB)
Lightning Bar
Flying Squirrel (TB)
Doc Horn (TB)
Debutante (TB)
Della P
Old DJ
mare by Old DJ
unknown
Doc Bar
*Porte Drapeau (TB)
My Texas Dandy
Sadie M
Texas Dandy
Lone Star
Streak
mare by Cap
Dandy Doll
Lawyer (TB)
Bartender II
Lundy
Bar Maid F
Red Joe of Arizona
Nelly Bly
Topsy by Gringo
