= Texas Dandy =

Quarter Horse racehorse and sire

- Breed: Quarter Horse
- Discipline: Racing
- Sire: My Texas Dandy
- Dam: Streak
- Maternal grandsire: Lone Star by Gold Enamel (TB)
- Sex: Stallion
- Foaled: 1942
- Country: United States
- Color: Sorrel
- Breeder: R. C. Tatum
- Owner: B. E. Brooks; Will Northington; Finley Ranches

Record
- 14 starts: 3-1-1; A speed rating

Earnings
- $61.00

Awards
- AQHA Race Register of Merit

Honors
- American Quarter Horse Hall of Fame

Texas Dandy (born 1942) was a Quarter Horse stallion who not only raced well, and sired outstanding broodmares, he was a movie star also.

== Life ==
Texas Dandy was a 1942 sorrel stallion registered as number 2112 with the American Quarter Horse Association (or AQHA). His sire was My Texas Dandy #4900, and his dam was Streak #612. He was bred by R. C. Tatum of Junction, Texas and owned by W. A. Northington of Egypt, Texas when he was registered with the AQHA. His sire was inbred to *Porte Drapeau, an imported Thoroughbred stallion. His dam was a daughter of one of the many unregistered Lone Stars, this one being the one sired by Gold Enamel, a Thoroughbred.

== Racing career ==
Texas Dandy raced for three years, with fourteen starts to his credit. He won three times, came in second once, and third once. He received a Race Register of Merit in 1947 with an A speed rating. He earned a total of $61.00 in race earnings.

== Film career ==
Texas Dandy was an early ambassador for the Quarter Horse breed when he co-starred in Boy From Indiana a 1950 film. The movie's story involved a farmboy from Indiana who started working for a Quarter Horse trainer in Arizona and ended up as the trainer's main jockey. The real problem in the movie was getting the finish filmed, as it called for the Quarter Horse, played by Texas Dandy, to beat a Thoroughbred race horse by a nose in a match race. It was to be filmed up close, by filming from a truck on the racetrack. However, Texas Dandy ran past the truck at least three times before he was finally tired enough to allow the Thoroughbred to come close to finishing with him.

== Breeding record ==
Besides starring in movies, Texas Dandy also was a noted sire. Many of his offspring earned Race Register of Merits with the AQHA, and he also sired three AQHA Champions – Little Egypt, Echols' Dandy, and Front Row. His daughter Dandy Doll was the dam of Doc Bar.

== Death and honors ==
Texas Dandy was 28 years old when he died in 1970, and he was inducted into the AQHA Hall of Fame in 1995.

== Pedigree ==
=Sundridge (TB)
=Sunstar (TB)
=Doris (TB)
*Porte Drapeau (TB)
=Ayrshire (TB)
=Bright Cherry (TB)
=Cerisette (TB)
My Texas Dandy
Sleepy Dick
Little Dick
Flora
Sadie M
*Porte Drapeau (TB)
mare by *Porte Drapeau (TB)
mare by Panmure (TB)
Texas Dandy
*Maddison (TB)
Gold Enamel (TB)
Enamel (TB)
Lone Star
unknown
Quarter mare
unknown
Streak
Tom Glover
Cap
Dutchie
mare by Cap
unknown
Duderstadt quarter mare
unknown
