= Three Bars =

20th-century American Thoroughbred racehorse and sire

- Sire: Percentage
- Grandsire: Midway
- Dam: Myrtle Dee
- Damsire: Luke McLuke
- Sex: Stallion
- Foaled: 1940
- Country: United States
- Color: Chestnut
- Record: 28: 12-3-1
- Earnings: $20,840

Major wins
- Speed Handicap

Honours
- American Quarter Horse Hall of Fame
- Last updated on July 5, 2007

A famous sire of Quarter Horses, Three Bars (1940–1968) was a registered Thoroughbred racehorse before going on to become a member of the American Quarter Horse Association's (or AQHA) American Quarter Horse Hall of Fame in 1989.

== Life ==
Foaled April 8, 1940, Three Bars was sired by Percentage and out of Myrtle Dee. After a promising showing in race training, he developed leg problems and never raced well before he was six years old. By that time, he was in Arizona, owned by Sidney H. Vail, who paid $10,000 for him in 1945. Eventually, his leg problems cleared up enough for him to race and show great early speed. He won the Speed Handicap in 1946 at Hipodromo de Tijuana, Tijuana, Mexico; which was a three-fourths of a mile, $4,000 ungraded stakes race for horses three years old or older. The winning time was 1:10 and a fifth. Vail leased him to Walter Merrick, an early breeder of racing Quarter Horses, for a few years, but also stood him in Arizona and California. Three Bars died in March, 1968 in Oklahoma on Walter Merrick's ranch.

== Sire Record ==
Three Bars was the sire of 29 AQHA Champions, 4 AQHA Supreme Champions, 317 Racing Register of Merit earners, and his foals earned more than $3 million on the racetrack. Among his famous offspring were Mr. Bar None, Gay Bar King, Sugar Bars, Lightning Bar, Tonto Bars Gill, St. Bar, Steel Bars, and Bar Money. Others include Triple Chick, Alamitos Bar, Bar Depth, Royal Bar, Josie's Bar, and Galobar. His grandson Doc Bar became one of the most influential sires of cutting horses ever known. Another grandson, Tonto Bars Hank, sired all around horses. Jewel's Leo Bars (Freckles), an outstanding cutting horse and sire of cutting horses, was another grandson of Three Bars (TB). Impressive, a triple descendant of Three Bars, became the most prepotent sire of Quarter Horse halter horses from the 1970s through the 1990s. His offspring Rocket Bar (TB), Sugar Bars, Lena's Bar (TB), Lightning Bar and Zippo Pat Bars were all inducted into the American Quarter Horse Hall of Fame. Of his grandget, Doc Bar, Zippo Pine Bar, Easy Jet, Kaweah Bar, Zan Parr Bar, and The Invester were inducted into the AQHA Hall of Fame. Four of his sons were AQHA Supreme Champions — Kid Meyers, Bar Money, Fairbars, and Goldseeker Bars.

== Sire line tree ==
Sire line descendant tree
- Three Bars
  - Barred
  - Tonto Bars Grill
    - Tonto Bars Hank
    - Sonny Gill
      - Gills Sonny Boy
        - Gills Bay Boy
  - Rocket Bar
    - Mr Tinky Bar
    - Nug Rock
    - Fire Rocket
    - Sugar Rocket
    - Rocket Wrangler
      - Dash For Cash
        - Cash Rate
        - Calyx
        - First Down Dash
        - Cash Legacy
        - Dashing Val
        - Dash For Perks
        - Takin On The Cash
        - Some Dasher
    - He Rocket
  - Sugar Bars
    - Flit Bar
      - Flit Rose
      - Robin Flit Bar
      - Fire Water Flit
        - Firecracker Fire
    - Bar Pistol
    - Sugar Leo
      - Sugar Vaquero
    - Otoe
      - Capotoe
      - Leotoe Bars
      - Otoe's Boy
      - Tee Cross
      - Beeotoe
      - Dr Medicine Man
      - Flashy Otoe
      - Otoe's Goldenrod
      - Otoe's Wonder
      - Toebars
      - Hard To Beat
      - Otoe Charge
      - Yankee's Otoe
      - Marshall Field
      - Man Of Action
      - Otoe's Marc
      - Otoe's Omen
      - Mr Big Stuff
      - Shotoe
    - Pacific Bars
    - Gofar Bar
    - Justice Bars
    - Jewel's Leo Bars
      - Jay Freckles
      - Freckles Playboy
        - Freckles Merada
      - Colonel Freckles
        - Colonel Leo Bar
        - Doc Jewel Bars
        - Colonelfourfreckle
        - Reveille Bar
        - Colonel Flip
        - Colonel Hotrodder
        - Freckle Kid
        - Freckles Top Brass
        - Just Plain Colonel
        - Nu Cash
        - Cols Little Pepper
        - King Badger's Colonel
        - Colonel Barrachone
        - Master Jay
    - Connie Reb
    - Counterplay
    - Jay's Sugar Bars
    - Mr Sugar Boy
  - Lightning Bar
    - Cactus Comet
    - Doc Bar
      - Doc's Dee Bar
      - Doc O'Lena
        - Lena's Peppy
        - Doc Athena
        - Montana Doc
        - Tanquery Gin
        - Shorty Lena
        - Smart Little Lena
        - Sugar Olena
        - Travelina
        - CD O'Lena
        - Mr Sun O'Lena
        - Todaysmyluckyday
      - Doc's Jack Frost
        - Quick Draw Cline
        - Sun Frost
      - Dry Doc
        - Dry Oil
        - Dry Clean
      - Doc's Lynx
        - Doc N Willy
        - Doc Egger
      - Doc's Hickory
        - Hickory's King Duce
        - High Brow Hickory
        - Vyntage
      - Doc's Mahogany
        - Royal Mahogany
      - Doc's Oak
      - Doc's Prescription
      - Handle Bar Doc
      - Doc's Tomcat
      - Genuine Doc
        - Shining Spark
    - Pana Bar
    - Lightning Rey
    - Relampago Bar
  - Bob's Folly
  - Steel Bars
    - Aledo Bar
    - Moon Bars
    - Barflite
  - Lucky Bar
    - Impressive
      - The Graduate
      - Mr Impressive
      - Conclusive
        - Mr Conclusion
      - Impressive Dandy
      - Zip To Impress
      - Tardy Impressive
      - Noble Tradition
        - Noble TKO
  - Royal Bar
  - Mr Bar None
    - Mr Juniper Bar
    - Win Or Lose
      - Sonny Dee Bar
        - Red Sonny Dee
        - Sonny Go Lucky
        - Scotch Bar Time
        - Lucky Machine
        - Reynolds Rap
        - Sonny Deluxe
        - James Caan
        - Sonny Go Royal
        - Dirty Larry
    - Bayou Bar
    - Bar None Joe
      - Mr Bar None Cactus
      - The Bar None Quest
  - Triple Chick
  - Gay Bar King
    - Mr Bar Gold
      - Gold Finger Bar
        - Shilabar Gold
          - Nate Shilabar
  - Alamitos Bar
    - Kaweah Bar
  - Pokey Bar
  - Bar Depth
  - Bar Money
  - Fairbars
  - Goldseeker Bars
  - Par Three
    - Zan Parr Bar
      - Reprise Bar
      - Zan Parr Jack
      - Zan Gold Jack
      - Zans Diamond Sun
  - Kid Meyers
    - Kid Saleen
    - Pretty Kid Bar
    - Buffalo Kid
    - Mister Aabee
    - Mr Kid Charge
    - The Maple Kid
    - Kids Delight
    - Bar Pass Meyers
    - Otoe Meyers
  - St Bar
  - The Ole Man
    - Sleepy's Man
      - Make Me Sleepy
      - Sleepy Clover Dale
    - The Poka Man
    - Ole Man Roan
      - Ole Man Can
    - Mr Horton
      - Leos Rebel Lark
      - Leos Ole Buck
    - Ole Badge
    - Man Jet
    - Ole Mans Pistol
    - Ole Gold Mine
    - Ole Rocket Chicaro
    - Ole Amadeus
    - Knight Of Ole
    - Ole Man B
    - Healey Falls Ole Man
    - Flyma Bars
    - Ole Heart Throb
    - The Ole Moon
    - Ole Man West
    - Whits Ole Man
  - Zippo Pat Bars
    - The Invester
      - El Cicatriz
      - Double Vested
      - The Big Investment
      - Bonafide
      - The Appraiser
      - The Stockbroker
      - Impulsions
        - A Sudden Impulse
      - Investers Skip
      - Vested Pine
    - Zippo Pine Bar
      - Zippo Cash Bar
      - Melody Zipper
      - Flashy Zipper
      - Mr Zippo Pine
      - Zippo Jack Bar
        - Hes Just To Sharp
        - Im Crystal Clear
        - Shine My Zipper
        - Sudden Inclination
        - Jacks Are Lucky Too
        - Too Sleepy To Zip
      - Zippos Due Claw
      - Zippos Mr Good Bar
        - A Good Machine
      - Zips Chocolate Chip
        - Chips Hot Chocolate
        - Chips Chocolate Star
        - Chipariffic
        - Chocolua
        - One Red Hot Zip
        - Skips Special Barb
        - Chip N Pie
        - Chipped In Chocolate
        - Chocolate Leaguer
        - Huntin For Chocolate
        - Zips Last Two Cents
        - The Cookie Baker
        - RA Undisputed
        - Fiesta Fudge
      - Zipabull
      - Zippo Ltd
      - Dont Skip Zip
        - Dont Skip The Cash
        - Dont Skip George
        - Dont Dress Me
        - Dont Skip My Charms
        - How Bout This Cowboy
      - Zippos Sensation
        - Brightly Zippo
    - Mr Pondie Zip
    - Zippo Pine Pat
    - Bar Pat Chris
  - Sport Bars
    - Three Bars By Shawne

== Pedigree ==
*Voter
Ballot ch. 1904
*Cerito
Midway ch. 1914
Sir Dixon
Thirty-third brn. 1902
High Degree
Percentage ch. 1923
Disguise
Bulse ch. 1913
Nethersole
Gossip Avenue ch. 1918
Magneto
Rosewood ch. 1914
*Rose Tree II
Three Bars
Commando
Ultimus ch. 1906
Running Stream
Luke McLuke brn. 1910
=Trenton
*Midge brn/blk. 1902
Sandfly*
Myrtle Dee blk. 1923
Ben Brush
Patriot bay 1906
Sandfly*
Civil Maid bay 1915
Carlsbad
Civil Rule bay 1899
Semper Victoire

* Three Bars is inbred 5D x 5D to the mare Sandfly, meaning that she appears fifth generation twice on the dam side of his pedigree.
