= Lightning Bar =

Quarter Horse stallion

- Lightning Bar
- Breed: American Quarter Horse
- Discipline: Racing
- Sire: Three Bars (TB)
- Grandsire: Percentage (TB)
- Dam: Della P
- Maternal grandsire: Doc Horn (TB)
- Sex: Stallion
- Foaled: 1951
- Country: United States
- Color: Sorrel
- Breeder: Art Pollard
- Owner: Art Pollard

Record
- 10–4–3–1; Stakes: 0–1–1

Earnings
- $1,491 (equivalent to $18,000 in 2025)

Major wins
- 2nd Beaudry Handicap; 3rd Juvenile Prep Stakes

Awards
- American Quarter Horse Association (AQHA) Race Register of Merit

Other awards
- AQHA Champion

Honors
- American Quarter Horse Hall of Fame
- Last updated on: May 24, 2009.

Lightning Bar (1951–1960) was an American Quarter Horse who raced and subsequently became a breeding stallion. He was bred by his lifelong owner Art Pollard of Sonoita, Arizona, and was the offspring of Three Bars, a Thoroughbred, and Della P, a Quarter Horse mare from Louisiana, then noted for the breeding of sprint horses. Lightning Bar raced ten times, achieving four victories and four other top-three finishes. His racing career was cut short by illness after only one year, following which he spent two years as a show horse. As a breeding stallion, he sired seven crops, or years, of foals, among whom Doc Bar was the best known. In 1960, Lightning Bar died of an intestinal infection at the age of nine. He was inducted into the American Quarter Horse Association's (AQHA) Hall of Fame in 2008.

== Early life ==
Foaled, or born, in 1951, Lightning Bar was bred to be a racehorse, but injuries and bouts of illness kept him from racing past the age of two. His breeder, Art Pollard, owned him for the horse's entire life. Lightning Bar was sired by Three Bars, a Thoroughbred stallion later inducted into the AQHA Hall of Fame. His dam was Della P, a daughter of the Thoroughbred stallion Doc Horn. His second dam, or maternal grandmother, was a mare who was never given a name, sired by Old D. J. Art Pollard purchased Della P from "Dink" Parker for $1,750 (equivalent to $23,500 in 2025) in the late 1940s. Della P was bred in Louisiana, a leader in breeding short distance racehorses between 1900 and 1940, and was taken to Arizona by Parker.

When Lightning Bar was about five days old Pollard was afraid that he had leg problems and was buck-kneed, and considered putting the colt to sleep. He sought Parker's advice, and as Pollard later related the story, "Dink just looked at me and shook his head. 'Ain't you ever gonna learn nothing? That colt's just what you're looking for.' " When mature, the sorrel-colored Lightning Bar stood 15.2 hands (62 inches, 157 cm) tall and weighed about 1,250 pounds (570 kg).

== Racing and show career ==
Lightning Bar started on the racetrack ten times, winning four races, coming in second three times, and third once. Among those finishes, he ran second and third in two stakes races, a type of race for higher quality horses with a higher payout. His total earnings on the track were $1,491 (equivalent to $17,900 in 2025), and his highest speed index, or comparative rating of his speed, was AAA, the highest achievable at the time. Lightning Bar raced for only one year, as he suffered from bouts of pneumonia, strangles, and leg injuries. He equaled one track record for two-year-olds at the Los Angeles County Fair race meeting in Pomona, California, running 330 yards (300 m) in 17.2 seconds.

After his racing career, Lightning Bar went on to become a show horse, earning 18 open halter points with the AQHA, and an AQHA Champion award in 1955. He won one grand championship and one reserve championship in halter classes at recognized AQHA shows.

== Breeding career ==
The first year Lightning Bar stood as a breeding stallion his stud fee, the amount charged to breed a mare to him, was $250 (equivalent to $3,000 in 2025) but only nine mares were bred to him. The next year, he bred 11 mares, but in 1956, he bred 102 mares at $500 (equivalent to $5,900 in 2025) each. One of Pollard's attempts to advertise his stallion involved letting one of his ranch hands take the horse to a local jackpot roping. Pollard assumed that the hand would just ride Lightning Bar around and show him off, but he later discovered that more was involved. Pollard said later that "I should have been suspicious when he (the ranch hand) returned with Lightning Bar that afternoon, with a sheepish grin on his face. I asked him how the horse was received, and he said 'The stud did good and I won the jackpot!' After congratulating him, I asked which rope horse he had used. He replied, 'The stud.' " (Note: Roping requires a horse that can accelerate quickly, going from standing to 30 mph (48 km/h) in a few seconds.)

Pollard said of Lightning Bar, "I always had to be careful about the kind of latch I used on a gate with that horse. He could figure them out faster than I could. He would open a gate, and go for a stroll." Lightning Bar sired 148 foals in his seven breeding seasons, and 118 of those foals went on to either race or show careers. Of his foals, 108 started races, and 77 won, earning a total of $476,949. (Note: No inflation adjusted earnings figures are given for the earnings of his foals, as the foals raced over a number of years, making the inflation adjustment unreliable.) The most successful of his foals, Lightning Belle, earned $60,134 (equivalent to $632,000 in 2025).

Five of Lightning Bar's foals earned AQHA Championships: Cactus Comet, Crash Bang, Lightning Rey, Pana Bar and Relampago Bar; Lightning Rey earned a Supreme Championship. In addition, Lightning Bar's offspring earned $1,163.32 in National Cutting Horse Association sanctioned cattle cutting competitions, (Note: No inflation adjusted earnings figures are given for the earnings of his foals as the foals showed over a number of years, making the inflation adjustment unreliable.) and four earned a Superior Halter Horse title from the AQHA.

== Death and legacy ==
Lightning Bar died in June 1960 from colitis-X, a disease of unknown origin that can kill rapidly and without warning. It infected many of Pollard's horses; of those affected only three survived. Heartbroken, Pollard sold his remaining stock and did not return to the Quarter Horse business for 15 years. He said later that "it was a nightmare when they were wiped out. Even now, we can still feel the sadness of losing those horses." Another time, Pollard remarked that "Someone once said that a man deserves one good woman and one good dog in his lifetime. To that quip, I would add one good horse. I certainly had one in Lightning Bar."

Lightning Bar was inducted into the AQHA's American Quarter Horse Hall of Fame in 2008. His most famous son was Doc Bar, who was also inducted into the Hall of Fame. Lightning Bar's daughter Glamour Bars was the dam of Impressive, who became well-known as one of the leading sires of halter horses. Two stakes races were run in Lightning Bar's memory, the first at Los Alamitos Race track in California for one year in 1961. The second ran from 1962 to 1966 at Ruidoso Downs in New Mexico.

== Pedigree ==
Ballot (TB)
Midway (TB)
Thirty-third (TB)
Percentage (TB)
Bulse (TB)
Gossip Avenue (TB)
Rosewood (TB)
Three Bars (TB)
Ultimus (TB)
Luke McLuke (TB)
*Midge (TB) (Note: An asterisk means the horse was imported into North America.)
Myrtle Dee (TB)
Patriot (TB)
Civil Maid (TB)
Civil Rule (TB)
Lightning Bar
Cesarion (TB)
Flying Squirrel (TB)
Katie W (TB)
Doc Horn (TB)
*McGee (TB)
Debutante (TB)
Hanrose (TB)
Della P
Crazy Cue
Old DJ
Mignon
mare
unknown
