= Poco Bueno =

Quarter Horse show horse and sire

- Breed: Quarter Horse
- Discipline: Halter; Cutting
- Sire: King P-234
- Grandsire: Zantanon
- Dam: Miss Taylor
- Maternal grandsire: Old Poco Bueno
- Sex: Stallion
- Foaled: 1944
- Country: United States
- Color: Brown
- Breeder: Jess Hankins
- Owner: E. Paul Waggoner
- Trainer: Pine Johnson

Awards
- AQHA Champion

Honors
- American Quarter Horse Hall of Fame
- Last updated on: January 12, 2008.

Poco Bueno was a brown American Quarter Horse stallion foaled April 10, 1944. He was sired by King P-234 and out of the mare Miss Taylor who was by Old Poco Bueno. Poco Bueno was named for his maternal grandsire, and the name means pretty good in Spanish. Poco Bueno is the stallion that is linked to the genetic disease Hereditary Equine Regional Dermal Asthenia (HERDA) in stock horses.

He was a solid brown horse with no white markings. When mature, he stood about 15 hands (60 inches, 152 cm) high and weighed about 1200 pounds.

== Show career ==
Poco Bueno earned his American Quarter Horse Association, or AQHA, Championship and dominated the Quarter Horse breed for decades. He was purchased by E. Paul Waggoner, of the Waggoner Ranch near Vernon, Texas in 1945 for $5,700. His show career started when he was named champion yearling stallion at the Texas Cowboy Reunion Quarter Horse Show in Stamford, Texas. He was grand champion stallion in the 1940s at Denver's National Western Stock Show, the Southwestern Exposition and Livestock Show in Fort Worth, State Fair of Texas in Dallas and the American Royal in Kansas City.

== Cutting horse career ==
As a 4-year-old, in 1948, Poco Bueno started his performance career as a cutting horse, trained and shown by Pine Johnson, who worked for E. Paul Waggoner at his 3D Stock Farm in Arlington, TX. He was the first Quarter Horse to be insured for $100,000.00.

== Breeding record ==
Poco Bueno sired 405 registered AQHA foals, 222 were performers. His most successful crosses were on the daughters of Blackburn. Among his famous get were Poco Stampede, Poco Tivio, Poco Lena, Poco Mona, Poco Bob, Poco Dell, and Poco Pine.

== Death and honors ==
Poco Bueno died November 28, 1969. Mr. Waggoner left specific instructions in his will that Poco Bueno was to be buried in a standing position in a grave across from the ranch entrance on Texas Highway 283. The plot of ground was landscaped with trees and grass. A granite marker, weighing four tons, was engraved with his name, picture and the inscription Champion and Sire of Champions. In 1990, Poco Bueno was inducted into the American Quarter Horse Hall of Fame.

== Pedigree ==
Traveler
Little Joe
Jenny
Zantanon
Billy by Big Jim
Jeanette
mare by Sykes' Rondo
King P-234
Yellow Jacket
Strait Horse
Gardner mare by Traveler
Jabalina
Traveler
mare by Traveler
unknown
Poco Bueno 1944 sorrel
Traveler
Little Joe
Jenny
Old Poco Bueno
Big Jim
Virginia D
unknown
Miss Taylor
Peter McCue
Hickory Bill
Lucretia M
mare by Hickory Bill
unknown
