= National Cutting Horse Association =

US horse association that promotes the sport of cutting

- Formation: Tax-exempt since July 1951; 74 years ago
- Type: 501(c)(5)
- Tax ID no.: EIN: 750978808
- Headquarters: Fort Worth
- Revenue: 32,661,348 USD (2024)
- Expenses: 30,216,774 USD (2024)
- Website: nchacutting.com

The National Cutting Horse Association (NCHA) is a non-profit equestrian organization headquartered in the United States. Their primary purpose is to promote and sponsor cutting events. The association was founded in 1946 at the Southwestern Exposition and Fat Stock Show. The first NCHA sponsored cutting horse competition was held that same year in Dublin, Texas.

The association is headquartered in Fort Worth, Texas and has several affiliate members around the world.

== Six major events ==
The NCHA produces six major annual events as follows:

1. NCHA Championship Futurity for 3-year-old horses which have never been shown in competition cutting.
2. NCHA Super Stakes for 4-year-old and 5-/6-year-old horses - their sires must be subscribed to the event.
3. NCHA Summer Spectacular (Derby) for 4-year-old and 5-/6-year-old horses (Classic/Challenge). (Note: The NCHA Futurity, Derby and Super Stakes are the three events that comprise the NCHA Triple Crown)
4. NCHA World Championship Finals with both Open and Non-Pro Championship classes. Fifteen Entries are taken in both based on the annual standings in each class.
5. Eastern National Championships - only contestants in NCHA's affiliate or area standings are eligible to compete in the 12 approved Championship classes. (Note: At the end of each year, beginning in 1976, the top ten area champions (leading money earners) comprising NCHA affiliates and their respective areas around the world competed in the NCHA Area Champion Work-offs which is held annually in the US. The winners in each division earned the championship title for their division, such as the NCHA National Open Champion and NCHA National Non-Pro Champion. In 1995, the championship event was split in two and became the Eastern National Championships and Western National Championships with 11 areas in each. There are 25 geographical divisions for competition in the US and Canada that comprise the NCHA. The NCHA Top Ten money earners in their respective areas qualify to compete in the respective division.)
6. Western National Championships - only contestants in NCHA's affiliate or area standings are eligible to compete in the 12 approved Championship classes. (Note: refer to note 1)

== Hall of Fame ==
The NCHA offers four Halls of Fame to recognizes exceptional contributions and/or accomplishments as follows:

1. Horse Hall of Fame - to give greater recognition to famous cutting horses
2. Members Hall of Fame - to recognize the outstanding and unusual contributions to the NCHA by certain individuals over a period of time
3. Rider Hall of Fame - to recognize exceptional riders of cutting horses who have qualified for this honor based on their lifetime earnings
4. Non-Pro Hall of Fame - to recognize exceptional non-professional riders of cutting horses who have qualified for this honor based on their lifetime earnings

== Notes ==
In 2019, the Top 5 Equi-Sat Cutting Sires were: One Time Pepto. LTE:($12,845,963) Smooth As A Cat. LTE:($24,830,037) Dual Rey. LTE:($38,897,142) Metallic Cat. LTE:($21,644,433) High Brow Cat. LTE:($79,279,171)
