= Jewel's Leo Bars =

Cutting horse

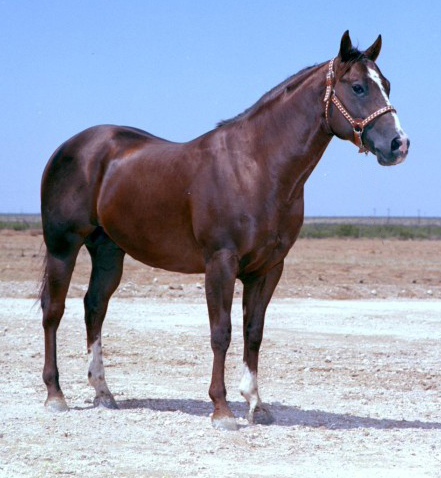
- Jewel's Leo Bars (photo c. 1968); AQHA #0206037
- Breed: Quarter Horse
- Discipline: Quarter-Horse Racing, Cutting (sport)
- Sire: Sugar Bars
- Grandsire: Three Bars (TB)
- Dam: Leo Pan
- Maternal grandsire: Leo
- Sex: Stallion
- Foaled: 1962
- Died: 1978 (aged 15–16)
- Country: United States
- Color: Sorrel
- Breeder: A.L Smith

Other awards
- Sire of three champion/co-champions in the 1976 NCHA Futurity Champion

Honors
- Sire of two stallions inducted into the American Quarter Horse Hall of Fame

Jewel's Leo Bars (1962–1978), commonly known as "Freckles", was a sorrel American Quarter Horse stallion sired by Sugar Bars, out of Leo Pan by Leo. He is considered to be one of the early cutting horse foundation sires, most notable for his influence on the performance horse industry. He was owned by Marion Flynt and stood at stud at Flynt's Square Top 3 Ranch in Midland, Texas, the home of "many legendary horses". In addition to being a notable foundation cutting horse sire, Freckles also competed in three different disciplines—racing, halter, and cutting—earning an AQHA Register of Merit in Cutting, Halter Stallion points, and a National Cutting Horse Association (NCHA) Certificate of Ability.

== Background ==
The breeder of Jewel's Leo Bars was A.L. Smith of Perry, OK. As a late weanling, he was sold to Ira S. Lethco of Fort Stockton, TX, and was later purchased as a yearling by Ford Harris and his son-in-law Kirk Coffman, also from Texas. They reportedly paid $5500.00, which at that time was an unusually high price for a Quarter Horse yearling. The stallion's pedigree was that of a horse bred to run, and as a yearling prospect, his conformation had the desirable traits of form to function, including a long hip, deep chest and depth of girth. Coffman was impressed by the colt's good looks, so he was shown at halter and won his class at two different AQHA approved horse shows, earning his first AQHA halter points in a class of 7.

Billy Bush was manager of the racing operation for Harris, and was also the first to nickname the young stallion "Freckles" because of all the sorrel spots on his blaze and stockings. Bush started Freckles under saddle as a 2-year-old before sending him to racehorse trainer, Bubba Cascio, who had trained the legendary Dash For Cash. As it turned out, Freckles simply did not have the speed necessary to make the cut for the All American Futurity or other races of that quality; his best AQHA SI was only 55. Cascio suggested gelding the horse, but Harris decided to consign him to a horse sale produced by Charles "Muscles" Foster in Coppell, TX, where he was acquired by Marion Flynt in exchange for a debt owed him by Foster. Flynt was in the oil and gas business, and owned a large ranch in Midland, TX. He was also president of the NCHA, which was struggling during that time. Flynt stayed with the NCHA, and became the longest serving NCHA President in its history, having served a total of 12 years (1956-58 and 1963-1971). In 1977, he was inducted into the NCHA Members Hall of Fame.

With his ties to the cutting horse industry, Flynt focused on seeing if Freckles could be a cutting horse. He contacted Buster Welch, a legendary horse trainer in the discipline. Shorty Freeman, who rode Doc O'Lena to win the 1970 NCHA World Championship Futurity, Open Division, was also recruited along with Welch to train and show Freckles.

“He was green broke when we got him. He was a pretty sucker, though, and just a real smooth working horse.”

— ~Buster Welch

== Show career ==
As a 4-year-old, with limited showing under trainers Welch, Freeman, and John Carter, Freckles won the cutting competition at the 1966 Houston Livestock Show and Rodeo and later that year, the Dallas State Fair, each with over 40 entries in the class. Delight Lee also showed him in a few AQHA cuttings, and then in 1970 John Carter showed him in the NCHA Open Division. Freckles also won the 1970 Southwestern Exposition and Livestock Show Open Cutting in Fort Worth, Texas, was 4th in the San Antonio Stock Show & Rodeo Open Cutting, won the Spring Cutting Circuit in Phoenix, Arizona and finished the 1970 year in 10th place in the NCHA Top Ten World Championships, Open Division, ridden by John Carter.

Ultimately Freckles earned his AQHA Register of Merit with 25 points in Cutting. He also earned 3 Halter Stallion points. In NCHA competition, he was awarded the Certificate of Ability with recorded lifetime NCHA earnings of $6,037.24.

== Foundation breeding stallion ==
The number of mares Freckles bred was limited in the beginning, and his stud book was closed to outside mares. Nonetheless, Jay Freckles, a 1970 stallion sired by Freckles, won the 1973 NCHA Futurity Champion Stallion, finishing 4th overall. That year, Flynt's ranch manager, Terry Riddle, started cutting horse training for three 2-year-olds sired by Freckles: Freckles Playboy, Colonel Freckles, and Mia Freckles. Riddle's goal was to show them in the December 1976 NCHA Futurity, the premier cutting horse competition for 3-year-olds.

In 1973, there were only 9 foals total sired by Freckles, and 376 entries in the 1976 NCHA Futurity. The three entries sired by Freckles comprised one-third of his 1973 crop, and had garnered substantial attention in the go-rounds and Futurity finals. That year, Colonel Freckles was the NCHA Futurity Open Champion, ridden by Olan Hightower and owned by Bob McCloud; Freckles Playboy, ridden by Terry Riddle, and Doc's Becky, ridden by Bill Freeman, were Co-Reserve Open Champions. The Non-Pro Futurity Champion was Mia Freckles, ridden by Kay Floyd. Terry Riddle had trained all four winners. The Fort Worth Star Telegram commented, "the $215,000 NCHA Futurity held Dec. 12 in Fort Worth might just as well have been held in Midland – that way Marion Flynt wouldn't have had to haul his awards so far home."

"As soon as I started breaking Freckles Playboy, he showed me he was special," Riddle said. "He was quick and a big stopper. In fact, when I first started driving him, he stopped hard and moved low, and it was all natural."

— ~Terry Riddle

Freckles sired a number of champion progeny, who in turn provided him champion grand-get. A leading example was his son Freckles Playboy, listed as one of the Top Fifteen Leading NCHA Super Stakes Sires in 2021 with combined earnings of $2,324,488.00 across all divisions.

=== Influence of genetics ===
Building a bloodline group of genetically superior horses that breed true requires breeders to research pedigrees back for many generations to foundation sires and dams. This helps create consistency by obtaining progeny information and individual performance records, but it also requires the breeder to skillfully match complimentary crosses based on their research.

“But it wasn't long before Flynt, and the entire cutting industry, realized that Freckles' worth was as a cutting horse sire and the "magic cross" was Freckles crossed on daughters of Rey Jay.”

— ~Glory Ann Kurtz, Western Horseman, Legends–Volume 6

Jewel's Leo Bars success at stud was an example of these principles at work. The Quarter Horse Journal had described Doc Bar as "a highlight" of the excellence found in crosses between Three Bars and Joe Reed bloodlines, and added that another "industry-shaping version" was the cross between Sugar Bars (a son of Three Bars with a line to Joe Reed) and Leo daughters. That cross "gave the industry Jewels [sic] Leo Bars (sire of Colonel Freckles and Freckles Playboy), Zippo Pat Bars (sire of Zippo Pine Bar), Otoe and Flit Bar..." The Jewel's Leo Bars x Rey Jay cross produced two AQHA Hall of Fame stallions, Freckles Playboy (inducted 2013) and Colonel Freckles (inducted 2004), both of whom were outstanding cutting horses as well as notable sires.

The principles of this type of selective breeding for success in specific disciplines were noted in a 2013 genomic study that found the Quarter Horse breed is "subdivided into different lines according to skills resulting from distinct selection objectives" and noted "a close relationship between physical characteristics and the function for which the animal is used." For cutting horses, those skills include, but are not limited to, athletic ability and trainability.

== Sire line tree ==
- Jewel's Leo Bars
  - Jay Freckles
  - Freckles Playboy
    - Freckles Merada
      - Meradas Money Talks
        - Lover Boy Merada
  - Colonel Freckles
    - Colonel Leo Bar
    - Doc Jewel Bars
    - Colonelfourfreckle
      - Colonels Smoking Gun
        - Gunners Special Nite
        - Gunnatrashya
        - Tinker With Guns
        - Gunners Tinseltown
        - Custom Made Gun
        - Always Gotyer Gunsup
        - Cannon Gun
        - No Smoking Required
        - Gun Dun It
        - All Bettss Are Off
        - Down Right Amazing
        - MMB Colonels Chexi
    - Reveille Bar
    - Colonel Flip
    - Colonel Hotrodder
    - Freckle Kid
    - Freckles Top Brass
    - Just Plain Colonel
    - Nu Cash
      - Nu Chex To Cash
        - Night Deposit Chex
        - NMSU Truckin Chex
        - Wimpys Little Step
        - Hot Smokin Chex
        - Big Chex To Cash
        - Nu Chexomatic
        - Lil Joe Cash
        - Nu Pops
        - Chexmaster
        - Heavy Duty Chex
      - Nu Jingles Beau
      - The Nu Colonel
      - Smart Little Cash
    - Cols Little Pepper
    - King Badger's Colonel
    - Colonel Barrachone
    - Master Jay

== Registration and pedigree ==
AQHA registration #0206037, 1962 sorrel stallion, breeder A.L. Smith of Perry, Oklahoma.

Midway
Percentage
Gossip Avenue
Three Bars
Luke McLuke
Myrtle Dee
Civil Maid
Sugar Bars
Captains Courageous
Rey
Goldie
Frontera Sugar
Ben Hur
Mare by Ben Hur
Joe Reed
Jewel's Leo Bars
Nellene
Joe Reed II
Joe Reed
Leo
Fanny Ashwell
Little Fanny
Call Shot
Leo Pan
Handy Cup
Handy Shot
Little Joe
Panchita
Mare by Little Joe
