= Zippos Mr Good Bar =

Quarter Horse show horse and sire

- Breed: Quarter Horse
- Discipline: Western Pleasure
- Sire: Zippo Pine Bar
- Grandsire: Zippo Pat Bars
- Dam: Tamara Wess
- Maternal grandsire: Blondy's Dude
- Sex: Stallion
- Foaled: 1984
- Died: July 22, 2016 (aged 31–32)
- Country: United States
- Color: Roan
- Breeder: Norman Reynolds

Honors
- American Quarter Horse Hall of Fame; NSBA Hall of Fame
- Last updated on: May 9, 2019.

Zippos Mr Good Bar (1984–2016) was a registered American Quarter Horse with the American Quarter Horse Association (AQHA). He is an American Quarter Horse Hall of Fame inductee for 2019. He was known for his show career and as a top sire. He was 32 years of age in 2016 when he died.

== Life ==
Zippos Mr Good Bar was a 1984 Roan son of Zippo Pine Bar out of Tamara Wess, a daughter of Blondy's Dude. Breeder Norman Reynolds of Lexington, Nebraska, was responsible for pairing his stallion, Zippo Pine Bar, to Tamara Wess. He was at the Saul Family Farm in Arkansas where he was given the barn name "Roan Boy". The color roan was not desired when he competed in Western Pleasure, but through competition and winning, he and his progeny changed that.

== Show career ==
The stallion earned close to $39,000 in the show ring. It was during his show career that the stallion caught the eye of the Narmonts of Auburn, Illinois. First they leased him, then became partners on him, and finally bought him in 1998.

== Breeding record ==
Zippos Mr Good Bar sired winners in all AQHA show disciplines. He sired 89 point-earners. These have earned $3.3 million along with 67,477 points, 22 world championships and 17 reserve world championships. His progeny have also earned points in the Palomino Horse Breeders of America and the International Buckskin Horse Association. He also excelled as a broodmare sire. His grandget earned $3.2 million, 72, 758 points, and 303 Superiors.

He was used to breed performance horses in which he produced 1,641 registered foals with at least 936 of them competing. He has 24 national level wins on top of All American Quarter Horse Congress wins. His progeny have nearly $950,000 in AQHA Incentive Fund earnings as well as over $1.6 million in NSBA futurity earnings. His most well-known progeny is daughter American Quarter Horse Hall of Fame member Vital Signs Are Good.

== Death and honors ==
He was inducted into the AQHA Hall of Fame in 1999. He was inducted into the National Snaffle Bit Association Hall of Fame in 2000. Zippos Mr Good Bar died July 22, 2016, at the age of 32 at Richland Ranch in Auburn, Illinois.

== Sire line tree ==
- Zippos Mr Good Bar
  - A Good Machine
    - Solo Invested

== Pedigree ==
Percentage
Three Bars
Myrtle Dee
Zippo Pat Bars
Leo (horse)
Leo Pat
Dunny Girl
Zippo Pine Bar
Poco Bueno
Poco Pine
Pretty Rosalie
Dollie Pine
Hobo
Hobo Sue
Home Gal
Zippos Mr Good Bar
King
Small Town Dude
Uncles Pet
Blondy's Dude
Blondy Plaudit
Blondy Queen
Johnnie Adair
Tamara Wess
Monsieur Joe
Joe M Moore
Papoose Bess
Jo Moore Star
Star Duster
Margie Star
Roan Queen
