= Freckles Playboy =

Cutting horse stallion, AQHA Hall of Fame member

Freckles Playboy (1973–2003, AQHA #0911588) was a sorrel Quarter Horse stallion sired by Jewel’s Leo Bars by Sugar Bars out of Gay Jay by Rey Jay. He was bred by Marion Flynt, and trained and shown in cutting horse competition by Terry Riddle. Freckles Playboy was the 1976 NCHA Futurity Co-Reserve Champion, placed 3rd in the 1977 NCHA Derby, and won the title of 1977 AQHA World Champion Junior Cutting Horse. In 1979, he developed navicular syndrome ending his career as a cutting horse.

Flynt gifted the stallion and some twenty head of horses to his ranch manager, Kay Floyd, who promoted Freckles Playboy as a cutting horse sire. He was a leading sire and maternal grandsire sire of champion cutting and performance Quarter Horses with offspring that have earned $24.56 million in NCHA competition. In 2003, Freckles Playboy developed kidney failure and was euthanized. He is buried on Floyd's ranch in Stephenville, TX. In 2013, he was inducted into the American Quarter Horse Hall of Fame.

== Sire line tree ==
- Freckles Playboy
  - Freckles Merada
    - Meradas Money Talks
      - Lover Boy Merada
        - RR Meradas Real Deal

== Pedigree ==
Percentage
Three Bars
Myrtle Dee
Sugar Bars
Rey
Frontera Sugar
Mare By Ben Hur
Jewel's Leo Bars
Joe Reed II
Leo
Little Fanny
Leo Pan
Handy Shot
Panchita
Mare by Little Joe
Freckles Playboy
Ranchero
Rey Del Rancho
Panda De La Tordia
Rey Jay
Tino
Calandria K
Tordia De Garcia
Gay Jay
Bill Cody
Sorghum Bill
Lasses Keturah
Georgia Cody
Jigges
WS Chestnut
Waggoner Mare
