= Zippo Pine Bar =

Quarter Horse show horse and sire

- Breed: Quarter Horse
- Discipline: Western Pleasure
- Sire: Zippo Pat Bars
- Grandsire: Three Bars (TB)
- Dam: Dollie Pine
- Maternal grandsire: Poco Pine
- Sex: Stallion
- Foaled: April 1, 1969
- Country: United States
- Color: Sorrel
- Breeder: Lloyd Geweke
- Owner: Norman Reynolds, Bob and Ann Perry

Other awards
- AQHA Performance Register of Merit, AQHA Superior Western Pleasure Horse

Honors
- American Quarter Horse Hall of Fame, NSBA Hall of Fame
- Last updated on: January 12, 2008.

Zippo Pine Bar (1969-1998) is the leading Western Pleasure sire of Quarter Horses.

== Life ==
Zippo Pine Bar was a 1969 sorrel son of Zippo Pat Bars out of Dollie Pine, a daughter of Poco Pine. Poco Pine was a son of Poco Bueno. Dollie Pine's dam was a descendant of Joe Moore, a half brother to Joe Reed P-3 and himself a descendant of Traveler. Norman Reynolds bought Zippo Pine Bar as a weanling at Lloyd Geweke's dispersal sale in 1969, hoping for a halter horse.

== Show career ==
During his show career, he earned from the American Quarter Horse Association an AQHA Championship, as well as a Performance Register of Merit and a Superior Western Pleasure Horse Award. He was the 1972 AQHA High Point Junior Western Pleasure Stallion and the 1972 AQHA High Point Junior Western Riding Horse. In 1992, he was inducted into the National Snaffle Bit Association Hall of Fame.

== Breeding record ==
He sired 1648 Quarter horse foals, 68 Appaloosas, and 72 Paints which collectively have earned over 50,000 show points. Five of his offspring have been inducted into the NSBA Hall of Fame — Mr Zippo Pine, Zippo By Moonlight, Zips Chocolate Chip, Zippos Mr Good Bar, and Zippos Amblin Easy. His son Zippos Mr Good Bar also was inducted into the AQHA Hall of Fame in 2019. In 2000, Zippos Mr Good Bar was inducted as well into the National Snaffle Bit Association Hall of Fame.

Others of his influential offspring include Melody Zipper, Flashy Zipper, Zippo Cash Bar, Zippo Jack Bar, Zippos Honeybee and Don't Skip Zip. In 1991 his offspring won World Championships in Western Pleasure in the AQHA, the American Paint Horse Association (or APHA) and the Appaloosa Horse Club (or ApHC).

== Death and honors ==
He was euthanized on January 12, 1998, at age 29 following a major stroke.

He was inducted into the AQHA Hall of Fame in 2000.

== Sire line tree ==
- Zippo Pine Bar
  - Zippo Cash Bar
  - Melody Zipper
  - Flashy Zipper
  - Mr Zippo Pine
  - Zippo Jack Bar
    - Hes Just To Sharp
    - Im Crystal Clear
    - Shine My Zipper
    - Sudden Inclination
      - Kickin Axe In Levis
    - Jacks Are Lucky Too
    - Too Sleepy To Zip
  - Zippos Due Claw
  - Zippos Mr Good Bar
    - A Good Machine
      - Solo Invested
  - Zips Chocolate Chip
    - Chips Hot Chocolate
    - Chips Choclate Star
    - Chipariffic
    - Chocolua
      - Chocs Hot Toddy
      - Roses And Chocolate
      - Choc That Up
      - Hand Written In Choc
    - One Red Hot Zip
    - Skips Special Barb
    - Chip N Pie
    - Chipped In Chocolate
    - Chocolate Leaguer
    - Huntin For Chocolate
      - Hubba Hubba Huntin
        - Huntin My Zipper
        - Hubbout A Dance
        - Hez A Dancin Hubba
        - No Doubt Hubbout it
        - Hubbout Me Forever
      - Mostly Chocolate
      - Hunti Big Dreams
    - Zips Last Two Cents
    - The Cookie Baker
    - RA Undisputed
    - Fiesta Fudge
  - Zipabull
  - Zippo Ltd
  - Dont Skip Zip
    - Dont Skip The Cash
    - Dont Skip George
    - Dont Dress Me
    - Dont Skip My Charms
    - How Bout This Cowboy
  - Zippos Sensation
    - Brightly Zippo

== Pedigree ==
Midway (TB)
Percentage (TB)
Gossip Avenue (TB)
Three Bars (TB)
Luke McLuke (TB)
Myrtle Dee (TB)
Civil Maid (TB)
Zippo Pat Bars
Joe Reed II
Leo
Little Fanny
Leo Pat
Little Chuck
Dunny Girl
Thoroughbred mare
Zippo Pine Bar
King P-234
Poco Bueno
Miss Taylor
Poco Pine
Pretty Boy
Pretty Rosalie
Waggoner mare
Dollie Pine
Joe Moore
Hobo
Paulita
Hobo Sue
My Pardner
Home Gal
Missie

== See also ==
- List of historical horses
