= The Invester =

Quarter Horse show horse and sire

- Breed: Quarter Horse
- Discipline: Western Pleasure; Halter
- Sire: Zippo Pat Bars
- Grandsire: Three Bars (TB)
- Dam: Hank's Peppy Lou
- Maternal grandsire: Dinky Reed
- Sex: Stallion
- Foaled: 1969
- Country: United States
- Color: Sorrel
- Breeder: Eldon R. England
- Owner: Jerry Wells; George Pardi; Jack Benson; Brad McCamy; Dan McWhirter; Wayne Atchley in that order

Other awards
- AQHA Performance Register of Merit; AQHA Champion; AQHA Superior Halter Horse

Honors
- American Quarter Horse Hall of Fame; National Snaffle Bit Association Hall of Fame

The Invester (1969–2002) was a Quarter Horse stallion who excelled at halter and at western pleasure, as well as being a famous sire of western pleasure horses.

== Life ==
The Invester was a 1969 sorrel son of Zippo Pat Bars and out of a linebred daughter of Dinky Reed named Hank's Peppy Lou. Hank's Peppy's Lou's dam Logan's Miss Lue, and she was out of a daughter of Dinky Reed.

Jerry Wells bought The Invester as a weanling at the Oklahoma State Fair in 1969. Later, he described the horse as "He was a cherry-red sorrel with stockinged legs, a real pretty head and neck, and lots of body and muscle. He was also straight and correct and a good-minded colt." Wells, however, felt that the original registered name of Hank Lou Bars wasn't a good fit for the colt, and renamed him with the American Quarter Horse Association (or AQHA) as The Invester.

== Show career ==
During his show career, The Invester earned an AQHA Superior Halter Horse award as well as an AQHA Championship and an AQHA Performance Register of Merit. He earned points in Halter, Cutting, English Pleasure, Western Pleasure, and Reining. Although known for being a halter horse, in 1972 The Invester missed making the finals of the National Cutting Horse Association Futurity semi-finals by just one point.

== Breeding record ==
Among The Invester's offspring are The Appraiser, Double Vested, El Cicatriz, Bonafide, Investers Skip, The Stockbroker, The Big Investment, Vested Pine, Assets, and Impulsions. His offspring The Big Investment and Impulsions were inducted into the National Snaffle Bit Horse Hall of Fame, along with his grandget January Investment. In 1980, his offspring placed first through fourth in the All American Quarter Horse Congress Two-Year-Old Western Pleasure Futurity.

== Death and honors ==
The Invester was the second Quarter horse stallion to be syndicated. In 1994 he was inducted into the National Snaffle Bit Association Hall of Fame. He was humanely put down on February 28, 2002, due to old age. The Invester was inducted into the AQHA Hall of Fame in 2004.

== Sire line tree ==
- The Invester
  - El Cicatriz
  - Double Vested
  - The Big Investment
  - Bonafide
  - The Appraiser
  - The Stockbroker
  - Impulsions
    - A Sudden Impulse
  - Investers Skip
  - Vested Pine

== Pedigree ==
Midway (TB)
Percentage (TB)
Gossip Avenue (TB)
Three Bars (TB)
Luke McLuke (TB)
Myrtle Dee (TB)
Civil Maid (TB)
Zippo Pat Bars
Joe Reed II
Leo
Little Fanny
Leo Pat
Little Chuck
Dunny Girl
Thoroughbred mare
The Invester
Joe Reed P-3
Reed McCue
Patsy Reed
Dinky Reed
Chief P-5
Dinky Rainbow
Black Dixie
Hank's Peppy Lou
Hank H
Last Hank
Preview W
Logan's Miss Lue
Dinky Reed
Logan's Betty
Logan's Ruby
