= Miss Meyers =

Quarter Horse champion race mare

- Miss Meyers in 1953 after winning at the Los Angeles County Fair
- Breed: Quarter Horse
- Discipline: Racing
- Sire: Leo
- Grandsire: Joe Reed II
- Dam: Star's Lou
- Maternal grandsire: Oklahoma Star
- Sex: Mare
- Foaled: 1949
- Country: United States
- Color: Chestnut
- Breeder: O. C. Meyer
- Owner: Bruce Green

Record
- 59–17–15–5; Stakes: 7 wins, 7 seconds, 2 thirds

Earnings
- $28,725 (equivalent to $345,000 in 2025)

Awards
- 1953 World Champion Quarter Running Horse; 1953 High Money Earning Race Horse; Stakes Winner; AQHA Racing Register of Merit; AQHA Superior Race Horse

Honors
- American Quarter Horse Hall of Fame
- Last updated on: May 24, 2009.

Miss Meyers (1949 – March 1963) was an American Quarter Horse racehorse and broodmare, the 1953 World Champion Quarter Running Horse. She won $28,725 (equivalent to $359,243.24 in July 2026) as well as 17 races. As a broodmare, she was the mother of the first Supreme Champion of the American Quarter Horse Association (AQHA), named Kid Meyers. She was the mother of three other foals, and was inducted into the AQHA Hall of Fame in 2009.

== Early life ==
Miss Meyers was a chestnut-colored mare foaled, or born, in 1949 and sired, or fathered, by Leo, a member of the AQHA Hall of Fame. Miss Meyers' dam, or mother, was Star's Lou. Star's Lou's father was Oklahoma Star P-6, another AQHA Hall of Fame member. She was bred by O. C. Meyer and later owned by Bruce A. Green.

== Race career ==
Miss Meyers raced from 1952 until 1955 and won seven stakes races, placing second in seven others, and third in two more. She won 17 of her 59 starts on the racetrack. She placed second in another 15 races and third in 5. Her total earnings from the track were $28,727 (equivalent to $345,300 in 2025). Among her wins in stakes races were the 1952 Buttons and Bows Stakes, the 1953 California Championship, the 1953 Billy Anson Stakes, the 1953 Rocky Mountain Quarter Horse Association World Championship Dash, the 1955 Bart B Stakes, the 1955 Barbara B Stakes, and the 1955 Traveler Stakes. She set four track records, twice at 350 yards (320 m), once at 400 yards (370 m), and once at 440 yards (400 m).

In 1953, she was named the AQHA World Champion Quarter Running Horse, as well as the High Money Earning Horse; the AQHA also awarded her the title of Superior Race Horse in 1954. The highest speed index she achieved, a measure of how fast she was able to run, during her racing career, was AAAT, the highest possible at the time. (Note: The author Nelson C. Nye, in his work Speed and the Quarter Horse claims that she started 60 times and earned a total of $29,305 (equivalent to $352,200 in 2025), but this conflicts with the AQHA's official records.) It was not until she was a four-year-old, during 1953, that Miss Meyers performed well and started winning on the track. That year, she won $15,398 (equivalent to $185,300 in 2025), over half her lifetime earnings, in addition to seven of her seventeen career wins.

== Broodmare and legacy ==
After Miss Meyers retired from the racetrack, she became the dam of the first AQHA Supreme Champion, Kid Meyers, sired by fellow Hall of Famer Three Bars, a Thoroughbred. A Supreme Champion is a horse that is outstanding on the racetrack, as a riding horse at horse shows and also conformationally, or how well put together the horse is. Kid Meyers was a 1963 sorrel stallion, and had 23 starts on the racetrack, winning 6 times. He earned a total of $10,655 (equivalent to $105,700 in 2025) from the track. After retiring from the racetrack, he earned his AQHA Champion in 1966 and his AQHA Supreme Champion in 1967. His highest speed index was AAA. Unlike most foals, who nurse for months after birth, Kid Meyers was orphaned at the age of one month in March 1963.

Miss Meyers had three other foals. Oh My Oh, a 1957 bay mare sired by the Thoroughbred stallion Spotted Bull, started 30 times, winning eight races for a total earnings of $12,592 (equivalent to $135,700 in 2025) and coming in second in a stakes race. She earned an AAAT speed index. As a broodmare, she was the dam of All American Futurity winner Three Oh's. Miss Meyers' 1958 foal was Mr. Meyers, a sorrel stallion sired by fellow Hall of Famer Go Man Go, who started 41 times, winning 9 times and placing third in four stakes races. His total race earnings were $25,656 (equivalent to $273,100 in 2025). He went on to earn an AQHA Champion title along with a Superior Race Horse award, to go with his AAAT speed index. Mr. Meyers became a successful breeding stallion. Miss Meyers' fourth foal was a 1959 chestnut mare named Milpool, sired by Vandy. Milpool was never raced or entered in a horse show.

Miss Meyers died in March 1963, shortly after having Kid Meyers. She was inducted into the AQHA's American Quarter Horse Hall of Fame in 2009.

== Pedigree ==
Pedigree of Miss Meyers
Sire Leo	Joe Reed II	Joe Reed P-3	Joe Blair (TB)
Sire Leo	Joe Reed II	Joe Reed P-3	Della Moore
Sire Leo	Joe Reed II	Nellene	Fleeting Time (TB)
Sire Leo	Joe Reed II	Nellene	Little Red Nell
Sire Leo	Little Fanny	Joe Reed P-3	Joe Blair (TB)
Sire Leo	Little Fanny	Joe Reed P-3	Della Moore
Sire Leo	Little Fanny	Fanny Ashwell	Ashwell (TB)
Sire Leo	Little Fanny	Fanny Ashwell	Fannie Richardson
Dam Star's Lou	Oklahoma Star P-6	Dennis Reed (TB) (Note: (TB) is an abbreviation for Thoroughbred, and signifies that the designated horse was not a Quarter Horse but was a Thoroughbred.)	Lobos (TB)
Dam Star's Lou	Oklahoma Star P-6	Dennis Reed (TB)	Bess Chitman (TB)
Dam Star's Lou	Oklahoma Star P-6	Cutthroat	Gulliver
Dam Star's Lou	Oklahoma Star P-6	Cutthroat	Belle K
Dam Star's Lou	Owen E. Acton bred mare		
