= Kay Floyd (cutter) =

American cutting horse breeder and exhibiter (1948–2015)

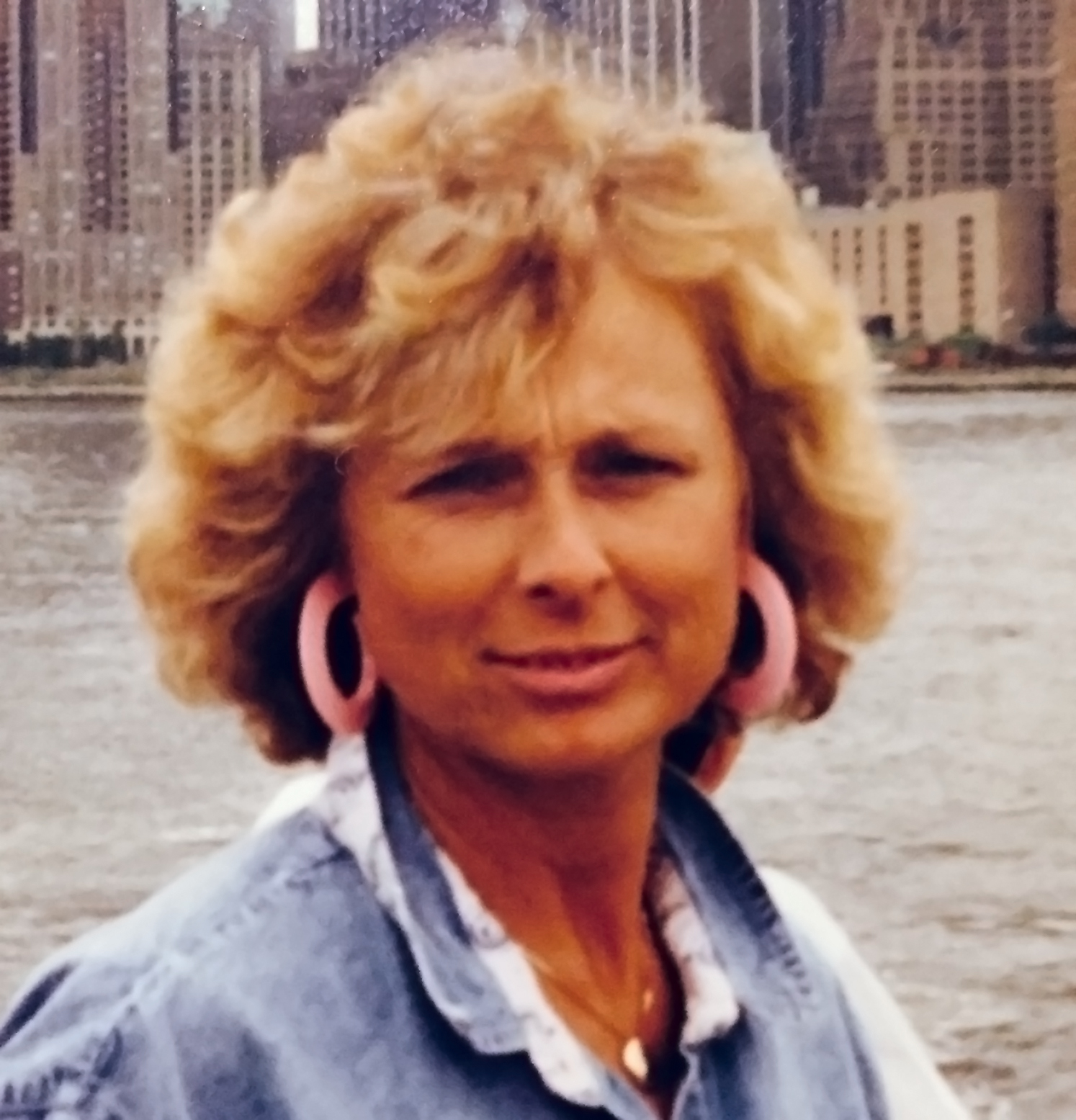
- Occupation: Horse breeder
- Discipline: NCHA Non-Pro cutting
- Born: 1948; Fort Wayne, Indiana, U.S.
- Died: August 17, 2015 (aged 66–67); Dallas, Texas, U.S.
- Resting place: Stephenville, Texas
- Major wins/Championships: 1976 and 1987 NCHA Non-Pro Futurity Champion; 1988 NCHA Non-Pro World Champion
- Lifetime achievements: NCHA Non-Pro Hall of Fame

Significant horses
- Freckles Playboy, Mia Freckles, Playfulena, Playboys Madera

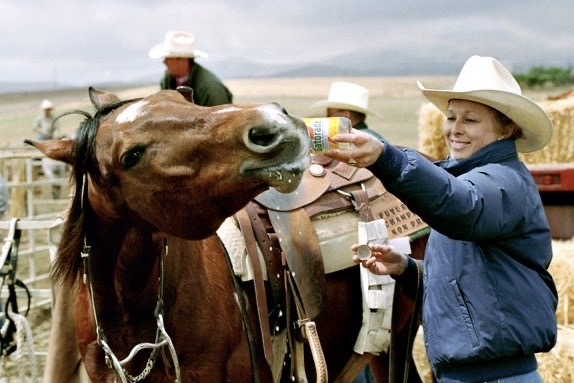
Kay Floyd and Freckles Madera at the Harris Ranch cutting in 1988.

Kay Floyd (1948 – August 17, 2015) was an American horse breeder who was the first woman ever to win two NCHA Futurity championships, albeit in the Non-Pro division (1976 and 1987). (Note: Kathy Daughn followed Kay Floyd with a slightly different first achievement as the first woman to win two NCHA Futurity championships in the Open division (1985 and 2000).) She also earned the title of 1988 NCHA Non-Pro World Champion, and in 1991 was inducted into the NCHA Rider Hall of Fame - Non-Pro Division. Floyd owned the stallion, Freckles Playboy (1973-2003), sired by Jewel's Leo Bars by Sugar Bars out of Gay Jay by Rey Jay, and bred by Marion Flynt. As of 2013, Freckles Playboy ranked 3rd on NCHA's list of all-time leading sires and maternal grandsire sires of champion cutting and performance Quarter Horses with offspring that have earned $24.56 million in NCHA competition. Among his champion offspring were Playfulena, the mare Floyd rode to win the 1987 NCHA Non-Pro Futurity, and Playboys Madera, the mare she rode to earn the title of 1988 NCHA Non-Pro World Champion.

== Career ==
Originally from Indiana, Floyd moved to Midland, Texas, in the 1960s, and gained employment as manager of Square Top 3 Ranch owned by Texas oilman and cattle rancher, Marion Flynt, a former president of the National Cutting Horse Association, and breeder of champion cutting horses. Flynt was the breeder/owner of the 1973 AQHA stallion, Freckles Playboy, who was trained and shown by Terry Riddle to win the titles of 1976 Co-Reserve NCHA Futurity Champion and 1977 AQHA World Champion Sr. Cutting Horse. In 1979, Freckles Playboy developed navicular syndrome, ending his career as a cutting horse. Flynt was planning to euthanize the stallion but Riddle convinced him otherwise, and he chose instead to gift Freckles Playboy to Kay Floyd. She promoted him as a sire and Riddle managed the breeding at his ranch in Wynnewood, OK where Freckles Playboy stood at stud to the public. His last crop of foals were born in 2002.

When Flynt sold out, he recalled gifting 15—20 head of horses to Floyd, who had been his ranch manager for 15 years. She promoted Freckles Playboy as a sire, and rode two of his offspring, Playfulena and Playboys Madera, to win championship titles. Freckles Playboy ranked third on the NCHA's list of all-time leading sires of offspring that have earned $24.56 million in NCHA competition. As an AQHA sire, he was ranked in the top 10 as an all-time leading maternal grandsire of cutting and working cow horses. Adding the earnings of his grand-get, the total earnings increase to over $35 million including AQHA alliance partners. His offspring earned more than $285,000 in National Reined Cow Horse events, and close to $177,000 at the AQHA World Championship Show. They also earned more than $125,000 in National Reining Horse Association (NRHA) events. In 2003, Freckles Playboy developed kidney failure and was euthanized. He was buried on Floyd's ranch in Stephenville, TX. In 2013, he was inducted into the American Quarter Horse Hall of Fame.

Floyd won the 1976 NCHA Non-Pro Futurity riding Mia Freckles by Jewel's Leo Bars, and the 1987 NCHA Non-Pro Futurity riding Playfulena by Freckles Playboy, earning her recognition as the first woman to win two NCHA Futurity championships. She rode Playboys Madera by Freckles Playboy to earn the title of 1988 NCHA Non-Pro World Champion.

== Floyd vs AQHA ==
Kay Floyd, along with several other cutting horse breeders, filed an anti-trust lawsuit against the American Quarter Horse Association (AQHA) for limiting the number of foals that could be registered per year per mare from embryo transfers, which was one foal at that time, regardless of how many embryos were flushed. Floyd initiated the lawsuit because the AQHA refused to allow her to switch her initial registration option from one foal to another, both of which resulted from multiple embryo transfers from the same mare in the same year. The lawsuit caused a stir among breeders who were in disagreement over multiple registrations resulting from multiple embryo transfers but Floyd was not asking AQHA to register both foals; rather, she simply wanted her original choice of foals for registration to be switched to another foal resulting from that same breeding. In June 2002, the AQHA reached an out-of-court settlement, and lifted its one foal per year restriction, allowing for an unlimited number of foals to be registered from multiple embryos flushed from the same donor mare in the same year.

== Death ==
On August 5, 2015, Kay Floyd had a heart attack, was hospitalized and underwent open heart surgery. She died a few weeks later on August 17, 2015, at UT Southwestern Hospital in Dallas, Texas. She had earned $451,801.95 in NCHA lifetime earnings.
