= Randy Chartier =

American horse trainer (born 1957)

Randy Lee Chartier
- Born: March 31, 1957 (age 67); St. Clair County, Michigan
- Occupation(s): Cutting horse trainer, NCHA Judge, clinician
- Years active: 40+ years
- Known for: 1978 NCHA Non Pro Futurity Champion riding Miss Dry, 1979 NCHA Non-Pro National Champion, 1979 NCHA Non-Pro World Champion, 1979 NCHA Non-Pro Rider Hall of Fame, 2015 NCHA Rider Hall of Fame–Open Division
- Spouse: Kelle Chartier – 2007 NCHA Non-Pro Hall of Fame

Randy Chartier (born March 31, 1957, St. Clair County, Michigan) is a cutting horse trainer, clinician, judge and competitor in the equestrian sport of cutting. He spent his early years riding and showing cutting horses with his late father M.L. Chartier at the family's Fairhaven Farm in Fairhaven, Michigan, where Dry Doc once stood at stud.

At age 21, he earned the title of 1978 NCHA Non Pro Futurity Champion riding Miss Dry, and in 1979 earned multiple championship titles that led to his induction into the NCHA Non-Pro Rider Hall of Fame. Chartier eventually decided to not renew his Non-Pro status, and started training cutting horses, and judging NCHA events. He relocated to North Texas, and built a cutting horse training operation near Millsap in Parker County where he and his wife, Kelle, reside. In 2015, he was inducted into the Open Division of the NCHA Rider Hall of Fame. He ended 2021 as the NCHA Reserve World Champion Rider riding "Classic Is Cool". At the beginning of the National Cutting Horse Association (NCHA) 2022 point year, Chartier had earned over $1.5 million in lifetime earnings. Chartier is the father of champion R.L. Chartier.

== Early years ==
Chartier began competing in cutting events as a youth under the guidance of his late father, M.L. Chartier. After graduating from youth competition, he competed in the Non-Pro Division riding cutting horses sired by the family's stallion, Dry Doc. He became well known as a Non-Pro competitor when, at age 21, he won the 1978 NCHA Non-Pro Futurity riding Miss Dry. The following year he rode De Doc and Bo Doc to win the 1979 NCHA Non-Pro National Championship, and the 1979 NCHA Non-Pro World Championship. Also in 1979, he was inducted into the NCHA Non-Pro Rider Hall of Fame.

== Professional trainer ==
Chartier eventually relinquished his Non-Pro card, and started teaching cutting horse clinics, and training cutting horses. He was competing in NCHA aged events in the Open Division, as well as in weekend NCHA sanctioned events where they also offered novice classes, and AQHA events that offered Senior and Junior cutting classes, such as the All American Quarter Horse Congress. In 2015, Chartier was inducted into the Open Division of the NCHA Rider Hall of Fame.
