= NSBA =

NABA may refer to:

- National Snaffle Bit Association
- National School Boards Association
- National Survey of Black Americans
