= Peppy San =

Quarter Horse show horse and sire

- Breed: Quarter Horse
- Discipline: Cutting
- Sire: Leo San
- Grandsire: Leo
- Dam: Peppy Belle
- Maternal grandsire: Pep-Up
- Sex: Stallion
- Foaled: 1959
- Country: United States
- Color: Sorrel
- Breeder: Gordon B. Howell

Other awards
- AQHA Champion; AQHA Performance Register of Merit; AQHA Superior Cutting Horse; 1967 AQHA High Point Cutting Stallion; 1967 NCHA World Champion Cutting Horse; 1962 NCHA Reserve Champion Cutting Futurity; NCHA Silver Award; NCHA Bronze Award

Honors
- American Quarter Horse Hall of Fame; NCHA Hall of Fame

Peppy San (1959–1989), a Quarter Horse stallion, has the distinction of the being the first National Cutting Horse Association (or NCHA) World Champion to sire an NCHA World Champion.

== Life ==
Peppy San was foaled in 1959, a sorrel stallion sired by Leo San and out of a mare named Peppy Belle. His sire was a son of Leo and was out of a descendant of Traveler and Peter McCue named San Sue Darks. Peppy San's dam was by Pep-Up who was bred by the King Ranch and was a double descendant of Old Sorrel. Peppy San's second dam was a mare from the 6666 Ranch named Belle Burnett.

== Cutting career ==
Peppy San was ridden for many years by Matlock Rose in cutting contests, before turning to a stud career. With the NCHA he earned $49,478.40 in cutting contests, receiving their Certificate of Ability, Bronze, and Silver awards. He was inducted into the NCHA Hall of Fame He was also the 1967 NCHA World Champion Cutting horse and the Reserve Champion in the 1962 NCHA Cutting Futurity. With the American Quarter Horse Association (or AQHA) he was the 1967 High Point Cutting Stallion as well as an AQHA Champion, Superior Cutting Horse and a Performance Register of Merit earner. He was humanely put down due to the effects of old age on April 26, 1989.

== Breeding record ==
Among Peppy San's numerous offspring were Peponita, Sanacee, Miss Peppy Gay Bar, Royal Santana, Sonita's Last, San Tip and Peppy's Desire. Peponita was inducted into the NCHA Hall of Fame as well as being the NCHA World Champion Cutting Horse for both 1977 and 1979. Three of his offspring won the NCHA Cutting Derby – Chunky's Monkey, Tip It San, and Peppy Lena San.Peppys Doc Bar Aus exported to Australia was inducted into the NCHA Hall of Fame(Australia).

== Honors ==
Peppy San was inducted into the AQHA Hall of Fame in 1991.

== Pedigree ==
Joe Reed P-3
Joe Reed II
Nellene
Leo
Joe Reed P-3
Little Fanny
Fanny Ashwell
Leo San
Zantanon
San Siemon
Panita
San Sue Darks
Sam Watkins
Little Sue
Sorrel Perez
Peppy San
Old Sorrel
Macanudo
Canales Bell
Pep-Up
Little Richard P-17
Petra R2
Lucky Mose mare
Peppy Belle
Caliente
Gold Rush
sorrel mare
Belle Burnett
Red Buck
Triangle Lady 9
riding type mare
