= Goetta (horse) =

Quarter Horse race mare

- Breed: Quarter Horse
- Discipline: Racing
- Sire: Go Man Go
- Grandsire: Top Deck (TB)
- Dam: Etta Leo
- Maternal grandsire: Leo
- Sex: Mare
- Foaled: 1961
- Country: United States
- Color: Sorrel
- Breeder: Ed Honnen
- Owner: Hugh Huntley

Record
- 31-22-2-1

Earnings
- $233,922.00

Major wins
- All American Futurity

Awards
- 1964 World Champion Quarter Running Horse, 1963 AQHA High Money Earning Race Horse, 1965 Champion Quarter Running Aged Mare

Honors
- American Quarter Horse Hall of Fame
- Last updated on: January 12, 2008.

Goetta was the World Champion Quarter Running Horse for 1964, and for a time led the list of all time money-earning Quarter Horse racehorses.

== Life ==
Goetta was a 1961 sorrel foal, sired by Go Man Go and out of a daughter of Leo named Etta Leo. Her dam was out of a daughter of Band Play, and the third dam descended from Peter McCue

== Racing career ==
Goetta raced for three years, with thirty-one starts. She won twenty-two of her starts, placing second twice and was third twice. The American Quarter Horse Association (or AQHA) named her the 1964 World Champion Quarter Running Horse, as well as the 1965 Champion Quarter Running Aged Mare and the 1963 Champion Quarter Running Two Year Old Filly. Her total earnings on the track were $233,920.00 and sixty-eight racing points. Besides the Championship titles, she also was a Race Register of Merit earner with an AAAT speed rating, and an AQHA Superior Race Horse. She won the All American Futurity, among other stakes wins.

== Breeding record and honors ==
She produced seven foals, six of whom were race winners with two of those being stakes winners. She died in 1978 giving birth to her seventh foal.

She was inducted into the AQHA Hall of Fame in 2007.

== Pedigree ==
Equipoise (TB)
Equestrian (TB)
Frilette (TB)
Top Deck (TB)
Chicaro (TB)
River Boat (TB)
Last Boat (TB)
Go Man Go
Wise Counsellor (TB)
Very Wise (TB)
Omona (TB)
Lightfoot Sis
The Dun Horse
Clear Track
Ella
Goetta
Joe Reed P-3
Joe Reed II
Nellene
Leo
Joe Reed P-3
Little Fanny
Fanny Ashwell
Etta Leo
Band TIme (TB)
Band Play
Fair Play
Bandette
Sam Watkins
J T 6
Mamie
