= Scotch Bar Time =

Quarter Horse show horse and sire

- Breed: Quarter Horse
- Discipline: Western Pleasure
- Sire: Sonny Dee Bar
- Grandsire: Win Or Lose
- Dam: Chubby Time
- Maternal grandsire: Spot Time
- Sex: Stallion
- Foaled: 1974
- Country: United States
- Color: Sorrel
- Breeder: Douglas W. Hobbs

Honors
- American Quarter Horse Hall of Fame

Scotch Bar Time (born 1974) was a Quarter Horse stallion and sire.

Scotch Bar Time was a 1974 sorrel stallion, sired by Sonny Dee Bar, and out of Chubby Time, a daughter of Spot Time. He sired 1186 foals in his breeding career, and his offspring have earned $136,394.00 in National Snaffle Bit Association (or NSBA) earnings. He was inducted into the NSBA Hall of Fame in 2002.

Scotch Bar Time was inducted into the American Quarter Horse Association's (or AQHA) AQHA Hall of Fame in 2009.

== Pedigree ==
Three Bars (TB)
Mr Bar None
Murl L
Win Or Lose
Leo
Lady Leo
Lady Thomas Wilson
Sonny Dee Bar
Midnight Jr
Chigger
Denver
Chigger's Baby
Midnight Jr
Sugar Foot M
unknown
Scotch Bar Time
Skipper W
Spot Cash
Southern Queen
Spot Time
Scooter W
H J Scootaway
Sagey
Chubby Time
Chubby
Chubby's Red Bud
Peggy May
Hat Eight Two
Midnight Mike
Poker Alice
Inez
