= R.L. Chartier =

- Occupation(s): Cutting horse trainer and competitor
- Known for: 2013 NCHA Rider Hall of Fame – Open Division
- Spouse: Mica Motes Chartier
- Parent: Randy & Kelle Chartier

R.L. Chartier is a cutting horse trainer and earner of over $2.5 million at the start of the 2022 NCHA point year. In 2013, he was inducted into the Open Division of the NCHA Rider Hall of Fame. R.L. is the son of Randy Chartier, NCHA Rider Hall of Fame in both the Non Pro and Open Divisions. He is also the grandson of NCHA Hall of Fame rider M.L. Chartier, which makes him the third generation of NCHA Hall of Fame riders. His mother, Kelle Chartier, is also an NCHA Non Pro Hall of Fame Rider. R.L. is married to Mica Motes, whose stepfather is Winston Hansma, winner of the 1994 NCHA World Championship Futurity riding CD Olena.
