= Sonny Dee Bar =

Quarter Horse show horse and sire

- Breed: Quarter Horse
- Discipline: Halter
- Sire: Win Or Lose
- Grandsire: Mr Bar None
- Dam: Chigger's Baby
- Maternal grandsire: Chigger
- Sex: Stallion
- Foaled: 1965
- Country: United States
- Color: Sorrel
- Breeder: E. V. Roberts

Other awards
- AQHA Performance Register of Merit; AQHA Superior Halter Horse

Honors
- American Quarter Horse Hall of Fame

Sonny Dee Bar (1965–1994) was a Quarter Horse stallion and famous sire of show horses, not only Quarter Horses but Paint Horses and Appaloosas as well.

== Life ==
Sonny Dee Bar was a registered Quarter Horse who was foaled in 1965. His sire was Win Or Lose, a descendant of Three Bars (TB) and Leo. His dam was linebred to Midnight Jr, as both her sire and her dam were by Midnight Jr. He died on August 20, 1994.

== Show career ==
Sonny Dee Bar earned a Superior Halter Horse award from the American Quarter Horse Association (or AQHA), along with a Performance Register of Merit.

== Breeding record ==
Sonny Dee Bar sired, among others, such famous horses as Red Sonny Dee, Lucky Machine, Sonny Go Lucky, Sonny Deluxe, Dirty Larry, Sonny Go Royal, James Caan, and Scotch Bar Time. He sired 1070 Quarter Horse foals in his breeding career, with thirty-one of them AQHA Champions, one AQHA Supreme Champion, and five AQHA World Champions.

== Honors ==
Scotch Bar Time was inducted into the National Snaffle Bit Association Hall of Fame in 2002. Sonny Dee Bar was inducted into the AQHA Hall of Fame in 2003.

== Sire line tree ==
- Sonny Dee Bar
  - Red Sonny Dee
  - Sonny Go Lucky
  - Scotch Bar Time
    - Time To Cash In
    - Mr Oakie Scotch
    - Hobby Scotch
  - Lucky Machine
  - Reynolds Rap
  - Sonny Deluxe
  - James Caan
  - Sonny Go Royal
  - Dirty Larry

== Pedigree ==
Percentage (TB)
Three Bars (TB)
Myrtle Dee (TB)
Mr Bar None
Moco Burnett
Murl L
Day Break I
Win Or Lose
Joe Reed II
Leo
Little Fanny
Lady Leo
David Thomas
Lady Thomas Wilson
Bonny
Sonny Dee Bar
Midnight
Midnight Jr
Salty
Chigger
Waggoner's Rainy Day P-13
Denver
Singleston mare
Chigger's Baby
Midnight
Midnight Jr
Salty
Sugar Foot M
unknown
