= Colonel Freckles =

Quarter Horse show horse and sire

- Breed: Quarter Horse
- Discipline: Cutting
- Sire: Jewel's Leo Bars
- Grandsire: Sugar Bars
- Dam: Christy Jay
- Maternal grandsire: Rey Jay
- Sex: Stallion
- Foaled: 1973
- Country: United States
- Color: Sorrel
- Breeder: Marion Flynt

Other awards
- 1976 NCHA Futurity Champion

Honors
- American Quarter Horse Hall of Fame

Colonel Freckles, a Quarter Horse stallion, was a cutting horse who earned $46,305.00 in National Cutting Horse Association (or NCHA) contests before retiring to a career at stud. He died in October 1986 from complications of eating blister beetles. Among his offspring are Nu Cash, Doc Jewl Bar, Reveille Bar, Just Plain Colonel, Master Jay, Colonel Hotrodder, Colonel Flip, and Colonel Barrachone.

Colonel Freckles was inducted into the AQHA Hall of Fame in 2004.

== Sire line tree ==
- Colonel Freckles
  - Colonel Leo Bar
  - Doc Jewel Bars
  - Colonelfourfreckle
    - Colonels Smoking Gun
      - Gunners Special Nite
        - Baileys Not Painted
        - Modern Gun
        - Special Made Whiskey
        - Lenas Shining Gun
        - Into The Nite
        - Guns And Dynamite
        - Alpha Onespecialnite
        - Gunner In The Nite
        - Shining At Nite
        - Tagin Stiletto Chics
        - CS Especially Moody
        - All Nite Partier
      - Gunnatrashya
        - ARC Gunnabeabigstar
          - Gunnabeabrightstar
          - Gunna Be First
          - Walla Be A Big Star
          - Gunnabeagreatdude
          - Star Code
        - Gunna Stop
        - Gunnastepya
        - Super Marioo
        - Gunnabebigtime
        - Gunnaoutdunya
        - Snapdragons
        - Trash Talkin Spook
        - Finals Bound
        - Good Time To Trashya
        - Ten Thirty
        - Trashinyurdreams
      - Tinker With Guns
        - Guns N Sparks
        - Tinker With Dreams
        - Guns N Dreams
        - Guns In My Genes
        - Whizzin Off With Guns
      - Gunners Tinseltown
        - MMB Chic Gun Renda
        - Setting Off To Town
        - Guns Required
      - Custom Made Gun
      - Always Gotyer Gunsup
      - Cannon Gun
      - No Smoking Required
      - Gun Dun It
      - All Bettss Are Off
      - Down Right Amazing
      - MMB Colonels Chexi
  - Reveille Bar
  - Colonel Flip
  - Colonel Hotrodder
  - Freckle Kid
  - Freckles Top Brass
  - Just Plain Colonel
  - Nu Cash
    - Nu Chex To Cash
      - Night Deposit Chex
      - NMSU Truckin Chex
      - Wimpys Little Step
        - Dox Steppin Out
        - Dun Being Wimpy
        - RC Fancy Step
        - Smart Little Stepper
        - Wimpys Little Boss
        - Wimpys Little Buddy
        - Wimpys Little Cee
        - Wimpys Tinseltown
        - Yellow Jersey
        - Crome Plated Step
        - Lil Star Stepper
        - Olena Wimpy
        - Shining Step
        - Steppin Off Sparks
        - This Wimp Can Dance
        - Whoyacallinwimpy
        - Wimps Chocolate Chip
        - Wimpys Lil Starlight
        - Wimpys Red Berry
        - Wright On Wimpy
        - Curb Service
        - No Wimpy Cowboys
        - Step It Up Jak
        - Wimps Quixote Cody
        - Wimpys Best Jac
        - Wimpys Show Stopper
        - Wimpys Showboat
        - Wimpys Tonnob
        - A Spark In My Step
        - Spin N Wimp
        - Steppin Nifty Nic
        - Wimpyneedsacocktail
        - Wimpys Connection
        - Wimpys Lil Star
        - Wimpys Little Jay
        - Wimpys Wound Up
        - A Nimble Wimp
        - CFR Centenario Wimpy
        - Cromes Little Step
        - Lucky Little Seven
        - Niftys Rock Star
        - Onegiantstepforwimps
        - Show Me The Buckles
        - Topsail Wimpy
        - Wimp Daddy
        - Wimpys King Lad
        - Wimpys Lil Hollywood
        - Wimpys Short Step BB
        - Wimpys Snow Step
        - Arc Surprize Steps
        - Mr Briteside
        - Pinesails Wimpy
        - Rebas Best Step Yet
        - Spooks Smoken Wimpy
        - Stepping In Time
        - Whimpys Flashy Jac
        - Wimpys Cable Lena
        - Wimpys Flashy Jac
        - Wimpys High Bid
        - Wimpys Little Dun It
        - Wimpys Little Freckl
        - Wimpys Littlecolonel
        - WLS Tinseltown
        - Berry Best Step
        - Jupiter Of Sun
        - Lenas Wimpys Rooster
        - Spooks Little Step
        - Sugar Pop Step Ahead
        - This Wimps So Fly
        - Wimps Cool Breeze
        - Wimpy Sparkles
        - Chics Want My Number
        - Wimpy Chic
        - Xtra Little Balou
        - Xtra Dun Step
      - Hot Smokin Chex
      - Big Chex To Cash
      - Nu Chexomatic
      - Lil Joe Cash
        - Joes Got Cash
        - Pretty Has Cash
      - Nu Pops
      - Chexmaster
      - Heavy Duty Chex
    - Nu Jingles Beau
    - The Nu Colonel
    - Smart Little Cash
  - Cols Little Pepper
  - King Badger's Colonel
  - Colonel Barrachone
  - Master Jay

== Pedigree ==
Percentage (TB)
Three Bars (TB)
Myrtle Dee (TB)
Sugar Bars
Rey
Frontera Sugar
Palomino DO
Jewel's Leo Bars
Joe Reed II
Leo
Little Fanny
Leo Pan
Handy Shot (TB)
Panchita
Mule Shoe mare
Colonel Freckles
Ranchero
Rey del Rancho
Panda de la Tordia
Rey Jay
Tino
Calandria K
Tordia de Garcia
Christy Jay
Leo
Leo Bob
89'er
Christy Carol
Mike Troutman
Mike's Dilly
Gypsy Diamond
