= Baby Doll Combs =

Quarter Horse rodeo mare

- Breed: American Quarter Horse
- Discipline: Rodeo
- Sire: Oklahoma Star Jr
- Grandsire: Oklahoma Star P-6
- Dam: Miss Boctick
- Maternal grandsire: Bert
- Sex: Mare
- Foaled: 1947
- Country: United States
- Color: Bay
- Breeder: H. M. Boetick
- Owner: Willard Combs; Bill Odum

Honors
- American Quarter Horse Hall of Fame; ProRodeo Hall of Fame

Baby Doll Combs (1947–1960) was a registered Quarter Horse mare and a prominent rodeo horse. She was posthumously inducted into the AQHA Hall of Fame and the ProRodeo Hall of Fame.

== Background ==
Foaled in 1947, Baby Doll Combs, also known as just Baby Doll, was bred by H. M. Boetick of Bloomfield, Iowa, and registered with the American Quarter Horse Association (AQHA), as registration number 81,497. At the time of registration, Willard Combs owned her, a steer wrestler or bulldogger who competed in the rodeo circuit in the 1950s. Combs purchased her from Bill Oduum of Pryor, Oklahoma, in 1955, paying $3,200 for her. Combs not only rode Baby Doll himself, but also allowed other wrestlers to ride her in return for a cut of the prize money.

== Rodeo career ==
Baby Doll competed in the Rodeo Cowboys Association (RCA) which was renamed the Professional Rodeo Cowboys Association (PRCA) in 1975. In 1955, Combs younger brother, Benny, won the steer wrestling world championship with Baby Doll. Then, in 1957, Combs himself won the world steer wrestling championship with her. Her one and only foal was Checotah Star, a result of an accidental breeding in 1957. Between 1953 and her death in 1960 she earned over $400,000 ($4,251,519 in current dollars) in prize money, and in 1957 when she won the title for Combs, she also carried the riders who finished second, third, fourth and fifth in the standings. Bill Linderman, a hall of fame and famous rodeo cowboy, once said that "Baby Doll knew bulldogging better than some of the guys who rode her."

When mature, Baby Doll Combs was a bay mare who weighed about 1,030 pounds and stood about 14.1 hands (57 inches, 145 cm) high. She had a blaze and a left hind sock as her only white markings. A short horse is an advantage to a steer wrestler, as it's closer to the steer.

== Death and honors ==
Baby Doll Combs died of a ruptured intestine in 1960. She died at a Kansas rodeo, but her owner had her returned to Checotah, Oklahoma, where he lived so that she could be buried on his ranch. Many of the cowboys who had earned money off her were present at the ceremony, and a photograph of them at the graveside appeared in Life Magazine.

Baby Doll Combs was inducted into the AQHA Hall of Fame in 2004. The PRCA honored her in 1979 by inducting her into their ProRodeo Hall of Fame in the inaugural group of inductees.

== Pedigree ==
Lobos (TB)
Dennis Reed (TB)
Bess Chitman (TB)
Oklahoma Star P-6
Gulliver
Cutthroat
Belle K
Oklahoma Star Jr
Little Earl
Little Earl Jr
Link Wiley mare
Babe Dawson
Little Earl
Queen
Texas quarter mare
Baby Doll Combs
Sam Watkins
Tommy Clegg
Mamie
Bert
Beetch's Yellow Jacket
Lady Coolidge
Mayflower
Miss Boctick
unknown
Bosticks Ribbon
unknown
