= Frank Merrill (equestrian) =

Legendary Quarter horse breeder and exhibitor

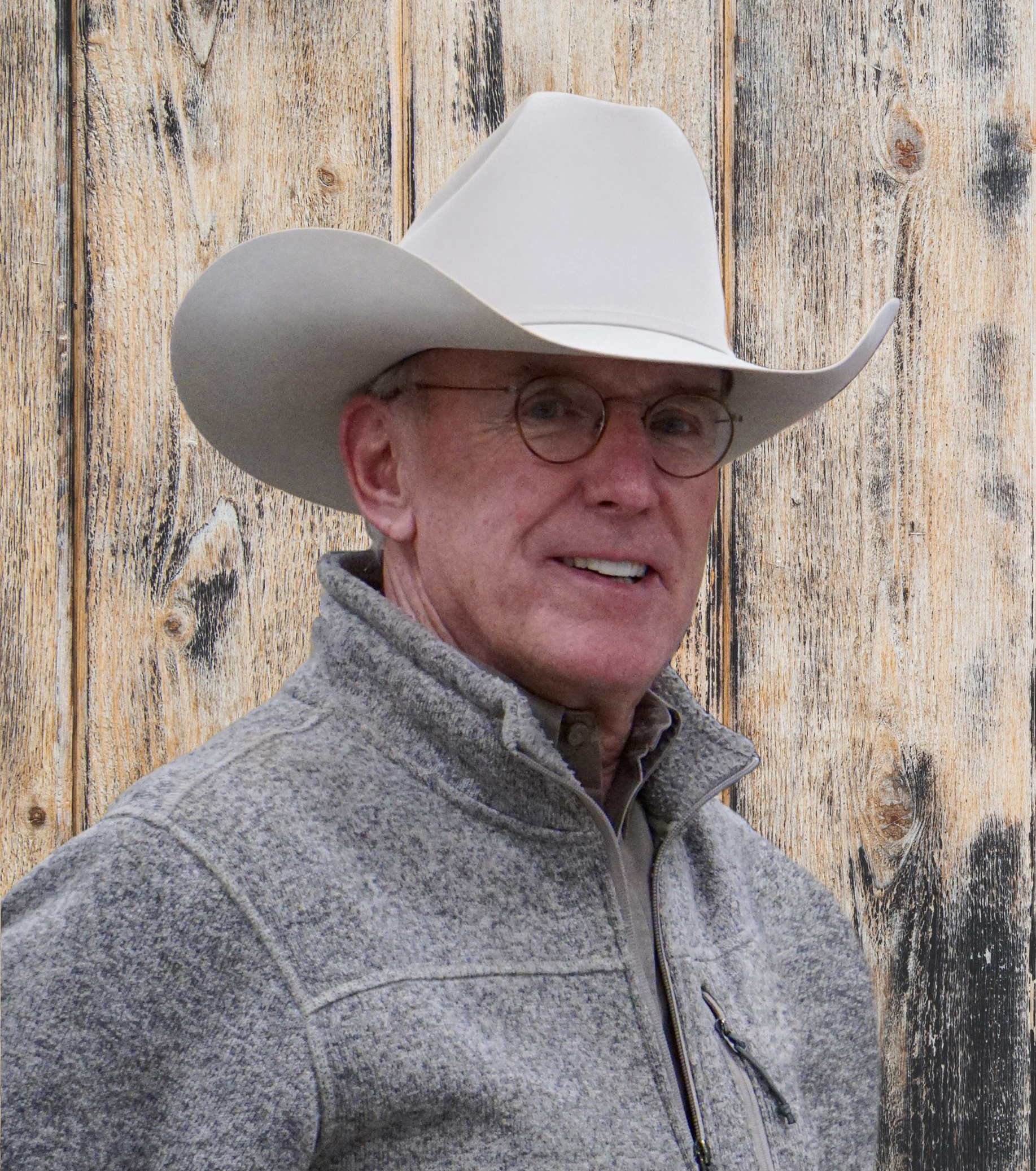
- (2019)
- Birth name: Frank Gerber Merrill
- Occupation: Horse breeder and general manager of Bob Moore Farms Group, LLC
- Discipline: NCHA cutting AQHA Halter and performance
- Born: 1948 (age 77–78); Fremont, Michigan
- Spouse(s): Robin Severinsen
- Major wins/Championships: AQHA World Champion Cutting
- Lifetime achievements: AQHA Hall of Fame (2013), Oklahoma Quarter Horse Hall of Fame (2012)

Significant horses
- Miss Jim 45, Royal Santana

Website
- Bob Moore Farms

Frank Merrill (born 1948) began his career in the quarter horse industry in the 1970s when he moved to Purcell, Oklahoma. During his 50+ year career as a Quarter Horse breeder and exhibitor, Merrill accumulated numerous championship titles in several different disciplines, including halter horse competition, horse racing, reining, cutting, working cow horse, and calf roping. Two of the horses he showed, Royal Santana and Miss Jim 45, were inducted into the AQHA Hall of Fame in 2000 and 2012 respectively. In 2013, he was inducted into the American Quarter Horse Association (AQHA) Hall of Fame, and is a past president of the AQHA. He is an AQHA director at large, a director of the National Cutting Horse Association (NCHA), a trustee of the United States Equine Foundation, and a director of the National Cowboy and Western Heritage Museum.

== Early life ==
The son of Ralph and Scotti Merrill of Fremont, MI., Merrill galloped on a horse for the first time at age 5. Riding became his passion which fueled his aspirations to become a cowboy. He rode at every opportunity, which included rides on his neighbor's horses, and the horses owned by his maternal grandparents, Dan and Dorothy Gerber. Frank won his first horse in a rodeo raffle; a mixed breed of Quarter Horse and Morgan. Frank's mother persuaded his father to let him keep the horse despite his father's objections, and that helped launch Frank's 50+ year career as an owner, breeder and exhibitor of American Quarter Horses. In 1967, Frank graduated from St. John's Northwestern Military Academy located in Delafield, WI, and attended Michigan State University. He first began showing horses in his home state of Michigan, and over time, expanded into other states.

In 1969, Merrill purchased the AQHA grand champion halter mare, Miss Jim 45, for $25,000 from Matlock Rose, and moved to Gainesville, TX to advance his horsemanship skills under the tuteledge of Rose and George Tyler. During the mare's lifetime, Miss Jim 45 had won 230 of 250 shows, including 176 grand champion mare titles, 33 reserve championships, and 642 halter points. She died in 1978, and in 2000 was inducted into the AQHA Hall of Fame. While in Texas, Merrill met halter horse trainer and breeder, Jerry Wells, and they became close friends. In 1972, Merrill established the 140 acre Windward Stud ranch in Purcell, Ok., and together with Jerold Wells built a technically advanced breeding farm which became notable in the 1980s for standing prominent Quarter Horse racing sires as well as top halter and performance stallions.

Merrill met his future wife, Robin Severinsen, at the All American Quarter Horse Congress in the early 1970s. Robin's father, Doc Severinsen, was the orchestra leader for the NBC Tonight Show with Johnny Carson. Robin's sister, Judy, is married to race horse trainer, Bubba Cascio. Merrill, together with his wife Robin, established a broodmare farm in Aubrey, TX where Robin lived for a while with her maternal grandmother, Ora Evans. Robin's mother, Evonne Severinsen, was a former director of penthouse services at Remington Park. Merrill courted Robin while she was living in Aubrey, and they married in 1975. They moved to Purcell, OK where he and Robin operated Windward Stud until it sold in 2006, then later established M5 Performance Bloodstock, located three miles west of Purcell in the heart of Oklahoma.
