= Frank Merrill (disambiguation) =

Frank Merrill (1903–1955) was an American general of World War II. Other people with the name include:

- Frank Merrill (actor) (1893–1966), American gymnast and actor
- Frank Merrill (equestrian) (born 1948), American equestrian
- Frank T. Merrill (1848–1936), American illustrator
