= Royal Santana =

Quarter Horse show horse

- Breed: Quarter Horse
- Discipline: Cutting
- Sire: Peppy San
- Grandsire: Leo San
- Dam: Royal Smart
- Maternal grandsire: Royal King
- Sex: Gelding
- Foaled: May 1971
- Country: United States
- Color: Sorrel

Other awards
- NCHA Platinum & Gold & Silver & Bronze Awards, NCHA Certificate of Ability, AQHA World Champion

Honors
- American Quarter Horse Hall of Fame
- Last updated on: January 12, 2008.

Royal Santana (May 1971 – 1995) was a sorrel Quarter Horse gelding sired by Peppy San and out of a mare named Royal Smart. Royal Smart was a daughter of Royal King and out of a descendant of Traveler named Moss Jackie Tobin.

In Royal Santana's show career he was an American Quarter Horse Association (or AQHA) World Champion and Reserve World Champion. With the National Cutting Horse Association (or NCHA) he earned $174,146.29 in cutting contests and a Platinum, Gold, Silver, Bronze and Certificate of Ability from the NCHA.

Royal Santana was inducted into the AQHA Hall of Fame in 2000. After he died in 1995, they buried him next to the arena named in his honor at Merrill’s Windward Stud.

Joe Reed II
Leo (horse)
Little Fanny
Leo San
San Siemon
San Sue Darks
Little Sue
Peppy San
Macanudo
Pep Up
Petra R
Peppy Belle
Gold Rush
Belle Burnett
Triangle Lady 9
Royal Santana
Zantanon
King
Jabalina
Royal King
Dolph
Rocket Laning
Cricket By Coldy
Royal Smart
Tobin Joe
Wardlaws Tobin
Wardlaws Streak
Moss Jackie Tobin
Jack Pot
Miss Jack Pot XI
Amanda I
