= M.L. Chartier =

Cutting horse breeder (1930–2006)

- M.L. Chartier showing Dry Doc. Finished 5th in the 1978 NCHA World Championships.
- Born: Malcolm L. Chartier; July 15, 1930; St. Clair County, Michigan
- Died: June 23, 2006 (aged 75); Kerrville, TX
- Occupation(s): ML Chartier Excavating, Cutting horse breeder
- Known for: Owner of Dry Doc, and inductee NCHA NonPro Hall of Fame (1980)
- Spouses: Christine J. Devaney (m. 1985; death 2006) Donna J. Cadle (m. 1951; div. 1982)
- Children: 4 including Randy Chartier
- Parent(s): Stanley and Lillian (Richardson) Chartier

M.L. Chartier (July 15, 1930 – June 23, 2006) was born in St. Clair County, Michigan. He was inducted into the NCHA NonPro Hall of Fame (1980) and showed cutting horses in both the National Cutting Horse Association (NCHA) and the American Quarter Horse Association (AQHA) sponsored events. He was also the owner of NCHA Horse Hall of Fame cutting horse stallion Dry Doc. Chartier is the father of current champion Randy Chartier and the grandfather of champion R.L. Chartier.
