= Phil Rapp =

Cutting horse trainer and inductee in the NCHA Rider Hall of Fame

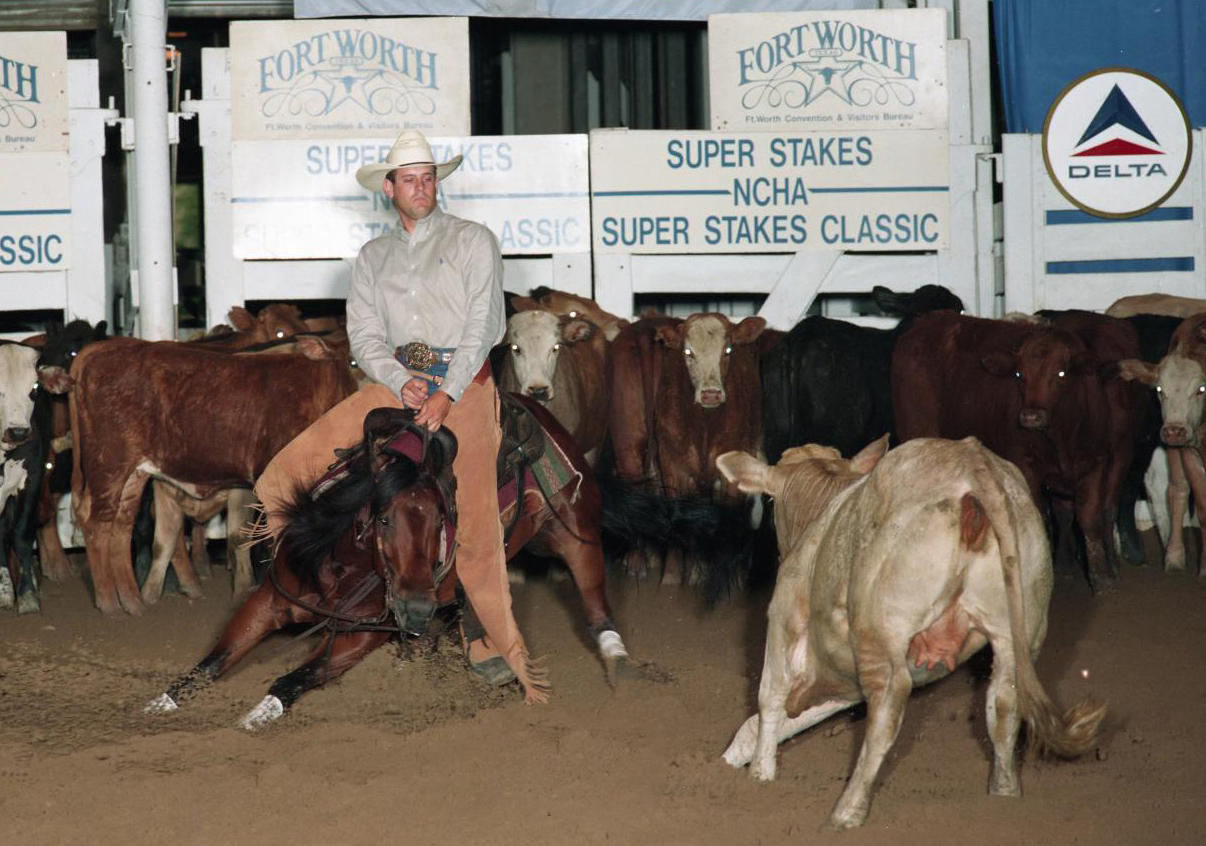
Phil Rapp riding Tap O Lena at the 1994 NCHA Super Stakes in Ft. Worth, TX

Phil Rapp of Weatherford, Texas, is a cutting horse trainer, inductee in both the NCHA Rider Hall of Fame Open Division and Non-Pro Division, and the leading NCHA money earner with lifetime earnings totaling $9,214,410.45 as of January 2019. He was elected vice-president of the National Cutting Horse Association in 2016, and became president in June 2018.
