= Zippo Pat Bars =

Quarter Horse show horse and sire

- Breed: Quarter Horse
- Discipline: Racing
- Sire: Three Bars (TB)
- Grandsire: Percentage (TB)
- Dam: Leo Pat
- Maternal grandsire: Leo
- Sex: Stallion
- Foaled: 1964
- Country: United States
- Color: Sorrel
- Breeder: Paul Curtner

Record
- 18 starts: 5-4-0; AAA speed rating

Earnings
- $1856.00

Honors
- American Quarter Horse Hall of Fame

Zippo Pat Bars (1964–1988) was an American Quarter horse racehorse and showhorse who became an influential sire in the breed.

== Life ==
Zippo Pat Bars was a son of the Thoroughbred stallion Three Bars out of a daughter of Leo named Leo Pat. He was a 1964 sorrel stallion bred by Paul Curtner. As a weanling, Curtner was offered $20,000.00 for the colt, which he turned down.

== Racing career ==
Zippo Pat Bars raced for two years, starting eighteen times. He won five races and placed second four times. He earned a Race Register of Merit with the American Quarter Horse Association (or AQHA) in 1966 with an AAA speed rating. He earned $1855.00 on the racetrack. He injured himself as a two-year-old, fracturing two vertebrae in a stall accident. The injury kept the horse out of the 1966 All American Futurity.

== Breeding record ==
After the end of Zippo Pat Bars's racing career, he retired to the breeding shed. He sired, among others, Zippo Pine Bar, Scarborough Fair, The Invester, and Mr Pondie Zip. His sons Zippo Pine Bar and The Invester were inducted into the American Quarter Horse Hall of Fame as well as the National Snaffle Bit Association Hall of Fame. His grandson Zippos Mr Good Bar also was inducted into the AQHA Hall of Fame in 2019. In 2000, Zippos Mr Good Bar was inducted as well into the National Snaffle Bit Association Hall of Fame

Zippo Pat Bars sired nine AQHA Champions, as well as sixteen Superior Western Pleasure Horses and four Superior Halter Horses. In 1996, Zippo Pat Bars was inducted into the NSBA Hall of Fame.

== Death and Honors ==
Zippo Pat Bars died May 1, 1988, due to heart problems. He was inducted into the AQHA Hall of Fame in 2002.

== Sire line tree ==
- Zippo Pat Bars
  - The Invester
    - El Cicatriz
    - Double Vested
    - The Big Investment
    - Bonafide
    - The Appraiser
    - The Stockbroker
    - Impulsions
      - A Sudden Impulse
    - Investers Skip
    - Vested Pine
  - Zippo Pine Bar
    - Zippo Cash Bar
    - Melody Zipper
    - Flashy Zipper
    - Mr Zippo Pine
    - Zippo Jack Bar
      - Hes Just To Sharp
      - Im Crystal Clear
      - Shine My Zipper
      - Sudden Inclination
        - Kickin Axe In Levis
      - Jacks Are Lucky Too
      - Too Sleepy To Zip
    - Zippos Due Claw
    - Zippos Mr Good Bar
      - A Good Machine
        - Solo Invested
    - Zips Chocolate Chip
      - Chips Hot Chocolate
      - Chips Choclate Star
      - Chipariffic
      - Chocolua
        - Chocs Hot Toddy
        - Roses And Chocolate
        - Choc That Up
        - Hand Written In Choc
      - One Red Hot Zip
      - Skips Special Barb
      - Chip N Pie
      - Chipped In Chocolate
      - Chocolate Leaguer
      - Huntin For Chocolate
        - Hubba Hubba Huntin
        - Mostly Chocolate
        - Hunti Big Dreams
      - Zips Last Two Cents
      - The Cookie Baker
      - RA Undisputed
      - Fiesta Fudge
    - Zipabull
    - Zippo Ltd
    - Dont Skip Zip
      - Dont Skip The Cash
      - Dont Skip George
      - Dont Dress Me
      - Dont Skip My Charms
      - How Bout This Cowboy
    - Zippos Sensation
      - Brightly Zippo
  - Mr Pondie Zip
  - Zippo Pine Pat
  - Bar Pat Chris

== Pedigree ==
Ballot (TB)
Midway (TB)
Thirty-third (TB)
Percentage (TB)
Bulse (TB)
Gossip Avenue (TB)
Rosewood (TB)
Three Bars (TB)
Ultimus (TB)
Luke McLuke (TB)
Midge (TB)
Myrtle Dee (TB)
Patriot (TB)
Civil Maid (TB)
Civil Rule (TB)
Zippo Pat Bars
Joe Reed P-3
Joe Reed II
Nellene
Leo
Joe Reed P-3
Little Fanny
Fanny Ashwell
Leo Pat
Golden Chief
Little Chuck
Chuck
Dunny Girl
unknown
Thoroughbred mare
unknown
