= Marion's Girl =

1948 bay Quarter Horse mare

Marion's Girl (1948 bay mare, AQHA #0027822) was a Quarter Horse mare owned by West Texas cattle rancher Marion Flynt, and trained for cutting horse competition by Buster Welch. She was the 1954 and 1956 NCHA World Champion Cutting Horse shown by Welch. She was inducted into the NCHA Horse Hall of Fame in 1962.

== Pedigree ==
Old Sorrel
Solis
Mother of Solis
Wimpy
Old Sorrel
Panda
Roan Q Mare
Silver Wimpy
Hickory Bill
Old Sorrel
Dr Rose Mare
Silver Lucy 016
Roan Clegg 1
Canales Bell
Pelicana
Marion's Girl
Olambala
Campfire
Nightfall
Tallwood
Peter Pan
Pixy
Laloulette
Joan Scharbauer
Not available
Scharbauer Mare
Not available
