= Bert (horse) =

Quarter horse stallion and sire

- Breed: Quarter Horse
- Sire: Tommy Clegg
- Grandsire: Sam Watkins
- Dam: Lady Coolidge
- Maternal grandsire: Beetch's Yellow Jacket
- Sex: Stallion
- Foaled: March 24, 1934
- Died: May 1956
- Country: United States
- Color: Brown
- Breeder: Bert Benear

Honors
- Inducted into American Quarter Horse Hall of Fame

Bert (1934–1956) was one of the most influential sires in the early years of the American Quarter Horse Association (AQHA). He was posthumously inducted into the AQHA Hall of Fame.

== Background and early life ==
Foaled on March 24, 1934 in Tulsa, Oklahoma, Bert was registered as number 227 with the AQHA. His registration entry gives his breeder as Bert Benear of Tulsa, Oklahoma and his color as brown. His sire, Tommy Clegg was a descendant of Peter McCue while his dam, Mayflower, was descended from both Yellow Jacket and Yellow Wolf. Lady Coolidge was a dun mare foaled in 1928, bred by Mike Beetch of Lawton, Oklahoma. Her dam was a match racing mare with a time of eleven seconds for the 220 yards. Bert's sire was used on the Benear ranch as a cowhorse before he was sold to Howard Martin.

Bert was bought as a colt by Bob Weimer of Council Hill, Oklahoma who named his new purchase after the colt's breeder. Bert was broken as a three-year-old, but before he could start on a riding career, he injured himself in barbed wire, almost cutting his right front foot off. After a recovery lasting months, Bert was sound, but his owner did not feel that it was safe to work him hard, as the colt had been purchased mainly as a breeding stallion prospect. In his prime, he stood 14.3 hands (59 inches, 150 cm) high and weighed close to 1150 pounds. Weimer claimed that he could "turn him out in the morning with the mares and drive out in the pasture in the evening with the pick-up and he will come to me as quick as I call him."

== Stud record and honors ==
Bert sired racehorses, roping horses, and all around ranch horses. He was the sire of eleven race starters, all of whom earned an AQHA Race Register of Merit. His foal who earned the most money on the racetrack was V's Bert, who earned $2777 from forty-eight starts with five wins, twelve seconds and five thirds in six years of racing. He sired four AQHA Champions, as well as Superior Halter horses and Superior Performance horses. His daughter Jeanne's Patsy was the 1955 AQHA High Point Roping horse. His granddaughter Baby Doll Combs was a noted rodeo bulldogging mare known as "Baby Doll" who was inducted into the ProRodeo Hall of Fame in 1979. Bert died in May 1956.

Bert was inducted into the AQHA Hall of Fame in 2007.

== Pedigree ==
Peter McCue
Hickory Bill
Lucretia M
Sam Watkins
Duke of the Highlands (TB)
Hattie W
Katie Wawekus (TB)
Tommy Clegg
Little Rondo
Red Bird
Shely mare
Mamie
John Crowder
Julia Crowder
Shely mare
Bert
Old Joe Bailey
Yellow Wolf
Old Mary
Beetch's Yellow Jacket
Yellow Jacket
mare by Yellow Jacket
unknown
Lady Coolidge
unknown
Nail Driver
unknown
Mayflower
unknown
Snip
unknown

== Additional sources ==
- American Quarter Horse Association (1961). Official Stud Book and Registry Combined Books 1-2-3-4-5. Amarillo, TX: American Quarter Horse Association.
- Nye, Nelson C. (1964). The Complete Book of the Quarter Horse: A Breeder's Guide and Turfman's Reference. New York: A. S. Barnes and Co.
- Nye, Nelson C. (1948). Outstanding Modern Quarter Horse Sires. New York: William Morrow & Company.
- Pitzer, Andrea Laycock (1987). The Most Influential Quarter Horse Sires. Tacoma, WA: Premier Pedigrees.
- Close, Pat; Simmons, Diane, eds. (1993). Legends: Outstanding Quarter Horse Stallions and Mares. Colorado Springs, CO: Western Horseman. ISBN 0-911647-26-0.
- Wagoner, Dan (1976). Quarter Racing Digest: 1940 to 1976. Grapevine, TX: Equine Research.
