= Joe Reed (horse) =

Quarter Horse racehorse and sire

Joe Reed P-3
- Breed: Quarter Horse
- Discipline: Racing
- Sire: Joe Blair (TB)
- Grandsire: Bonnie Joe (TB)
- Dam: Della Moore
- Maternal grandsire: Old DJ
- Sex: Stallion
- Foaled: 1921
- Died: 1947 (aged 25–26)
- Country: United States
- Color: Chestnut
- Breeder: Henry Lindsey
- Owner: John Wesley House, Joe Slankard

Honors
- AQHA Hall of Fame

Joe Reed (1921–1947), often known as Joe Reed P-3, was a Quarter Horse racehorse from the early days of the American Quarter Horse Association (or AQHA) that became an influential sire with the breed.

== Life and racing career ==
Joe Reed P-3 was registered with number 3 in the AQHA. He was foaled in 1921, the offspring of two famous short track racehorses. He was a chestnut stallion, bred by Henry Lindsey of Granger, Texas. When he was registered with the AQHA he was owned by J. J. Slankard, of Elk City, Oklahoma. He died on May 19, 1947. His sire was a Thoroughbred that mainly raced on the short tracks who once famously lost to Pan Zareta. Joe Reed's dam was a Louisiana bred quarter mare whose breeding has always been somewhat controversial.

The actual decision to breed Della Moore to Joe Blair has always been attributed to the desire of the racetrack grooms to quiet the two horses during a backside craps game. According to this story, Della Moore was in heat and both she and Joe Blair were making such a racket that it was disturbing the gambling, so the horses were bred to shut them up, without any knowledge of Della Moore's owner Henry Lindsey. Several months later, it became obvious that Della Moore was pregnant and Lindsey tracked down what exactly had happened. Joe Reed later turned into a decent match racer himself, although all of his racing took place before the organization of the AQHA.

== Breeding record and honors ==
Joe Reed was the sire of several outstanding horses, including Joe Reed II, Red Joe of Arizona, Joe Sunday, Joe's Last, and Catechu. He was the double grandsire of Leo. Joe Reed P-3 sired six horses that earned a Race Register of Merit. Many of his daughters became the dams of Race Register of Merit earners. His son Joe Reed II was the Champion Quarter Running Stallion for 1942–1943. His grandson Jose Uno was inducted into the National Cutting Horse Association (or NCHA) Hall of Fame. More distant descendants include Zippo Pat Bars, Colonel Freckles, Goetta, Peppy San, Rugged Lark, Sonny Dee Bar, The Invester, and Zippo Pine Bar – all members of the AQHA Hall of Fame.

Joe Reed was inducted into the AQHA Hall of Fame in 1992.

== Pedigree ==
Enquirer (TB)
Faustus (TB)
Lizzie G (TB)
Bonnie Joe (TB)
Bonnie Scotland (TB)
Bonnie Rose (TB)
Melrose (TB)
Joe Blair (TB)
*King Galop (TB)
Bowling Green (TB)
*Playing Fields (TB)
Miss Blair (TB)
*Pursebearer (TB)
Com-I-Cut (TB)
Isbell (TB)
Joe Reed P-3
*Queue (TB)
Crazy Cue
Lannie
Old DJ
Carlos
Mignon
Inez
Della Moore
Blakemore (TB)
Shamrock
Pelegie
Belle
Dewey (TB)
Dilly
Ella
