= Sugar Bars =

Quarter Horse racehorse and sire

- Breed: Quarter Horse
- Discipline: Racing
- Sire: Three Bars (TB)
- Grandsire: Percentage (TB)
- Dam: Frontera Sugar
- Maternal grandsire: Rey
- Sex: Stallion
- Foaled: 1951
- Country: United States
- Color: Sorrel
- Breeder: George E. Wood
- Owner: Bud Warren, Roy Hittson

Record
- 30 starts: 7-4-7; AAA speed rating

Earnings
- $3164.00

Honors
- American Quarter Horse Hall of Fame

Sugar Bars (1951–1972) was a Quarter Horse racehorse and stallion who sired many Quarter horse race and show horses.

== Life ==
Sugar Bars, a sorrel stallion, foaled in 1951 in El Paso, Texas. He was registered as number 42,606 with the American Quarter Horse Association (or AQHA). His breeder was George E. Wood, and his owner at the time he was registered was Bud Warren of Perry, Oklahoma. His sire was Three Bars (TB). Frontera Sugar, his dam, has a small bit of controversy attached to her breeding. Her breeder later registered Frontera Sugar's dam as Palomino DO, but the AQHA has never gotten this correction into their records. Palomino DO was registered in 1947 with number 8353. Her breeding was given as by a son of Ben Hur, and out of a Reynolds Brothers mare. This is not the Reynolds that bred Frontera Sugar, but rather the Reynolds Brothers that owned the X Ranch in Kent, Texas.

== Race career ==
Sugar Bars raced for three years on the racetrack. He started thirty times, with seven wins, four seconds and seven thirds to his credit. He earned $3164.00 and an AAA speed rating to go with his AQHA Race Register of Merit. Bud Warren, who owned Sugar Bars after his racing career ended, claimed that Sugar Bars was a "good racehorse," not a "great one."

== Breeding record ==
After his racing career was over, Sugar Bars was bought by Bud Warren to cross on the Leo mares that Warren had been breeding. Waren bought Sugar Bars in 1954 for $2500. In 1968, Warren decided that he needed to let Sugar Bars go, as he had enough of his blood in his breeding program. Sugar Bars was sold to Sid Huntley and Dean Parker, who moved Sugar Bars to California and continued to stand him to the public until the horse's death. Sugar Bars died on June 6, 1972, of a heart attack following colic surgery.

In his breeding career, Sugar Bars sired such notable horses as Sugar Leda, Jay's Sugar Bars, Nice N Sweet, Mr. Sugar Boy, Otoe, Cabin Bar, Gofar Bar, and Bar Pistol. Sugar Leda was the 1968 AQHA High Point Halter Horse. His offspring Sugar Line and Jay's Sugar Bars were AQHA High Point Reining Horses, in 1976 and 1978 respectively. Sugar Bars sired thirty AQHA Champions. Both Otoe and Gofar Bar were AAA rated horses on the racetrack as well as both earning an AQHA Championship. Sugar Bars' grandson, Sugar Vaquero, was the 1973 National Cutting Horse Association (NCHA) World Champion Cutting Horse and a member of the NCHA Hall of Fame.

== Honors ==
Sugar Bars was inducted into the AQHA Hall of Fame in 1994.

== Sire line tree ==
- Sugar Bars
  - Flit Bar
    - Flit Rose
    - Robin Flit Bar
    - Fire Water Flit
      - Firecracker Fire
        - Rare Dillion
  - Bar Pistol
  - Sugar Leo
    - Sugar Vaquero
  - Otoe
    - Capotoe
    - Leotoe Bars
    - Otoe's Boy
    - Tee Cross
    - Beeotoe
    - Dr Medicine Man
    - Flashy Otoe
    - Otoe's Goldenrod
    - Otoe's Wonder
    - Toebars
    - Hard To Beat
    - Otoe Charge
    - Yankee's Otoe
    - Marshall Field
    - Man Of Action
    - Otoe's Marc
    - Otoe's Omen
    - Mr Big Stuff
    - Shotoe
  - Pacific Bars
  - Gofar Bar
  - Justice Bars
  - Jewel's Leo Bars
    - Jay Freckles
    - Freckles Playboy
      - Freckles Merada
        - Meradas Money Talks
    - Colonel Freckles
      - Colonel Leo Bar
      - Doc Jewel Bars
      - Colonelfourfreckle
        - Colonels Smoking Gun
      - Reveille Bar
      - Colonel Flip
      - Colonel Hotrodder
      - Freckle Kid
      - Freckles Top Brass
      - Just Plain Colonel
      - Nu Cash
        - Nu Chex To Cash
        - Nu Jingles Beau
        - The Nu Colonel
        - Smart Little Cash
      - Cols Little Pepper
      - King Badger's Colonel
      - Colonel Barrachone
      - Master Jay
  - Connie Reb
  - Counterplay
  - Jay's Sugar Bars
  - Mr Sugar Boy

== Pedigree ==
Ballot (TB)
Midway (TB)
Thirty-third (TB)
Percentage (TB)
Bulse (TB)
Gossip Avenue (TB)
Rosewood (TB)
Three Bars (TB)
Ultimus (TB)
Luke McLuke (TB)
Midge (TB)
Myrtle Dee (TB)
Patriot (TB)
Civil Maid (TB)
Civil Rule (TB)
Sugar Bars
Stimulus (TB)
Captains Courageous (TB)
*Sea Dream (TB)
Rey
Red Lantados
Goldie
Goldust
Frontera Sugar
Ben Hur
colt by Ben Hur
unknown
Palomino DO
unknown
Reynolds mare
unknown
