= Pecho Dexter =

Quarter Horse show horse

- Breed: Quarter Horse
- Discipline: Showing
- Sire: Poco Pecho
- Grandsire: Poco Pine
- Dam: Miss Hogan
- Maternal grandsire: Joe Dexter
- Sex: Gelding
- Foaled: 1963
- Country: United States
- Color: Sorrel

Other awards
- 1966 & 1967 & 1969 & 1970 AQHA High Point Halter Horse; 1966 & 1967 & 1969 & 1970 High Point Western Pleasure Horse; 1968 & 1969 & 1970 AQHA High Point English Pleasure Horse; 1968 & 1969 AQHA High Point Trail Horse

Honors
- American Quarter Horse Hall of Fame; National Snaffle Bit Association Hall of Fame

Pecho Dexter (1963–1984) was an American Quarter Horse. He earned his slot in the American Quarter Horse Hall of Fame by the claiming 13 year-end high point awards in four years, showing in halter, western pleasure, trail horse, and what was then called English Pleasure, but is now Hunter Under Saddle. In all, he earned a total of 1058 points with the American Quarter Horse Association (or AQHA).

Pecho Dexter was a gelding, a son of Poco Pecho, grandson of Hall of Fame member Poco Pine, and a descendant of Poco Bueno. His dam Miss Hogan was a double descendant of Golden Chief. He also traced to Peter McCue and Joe Hancock P-455.

Pecho Dexter died in 1984 and in 2005 was inducted into the AQHA Hall of Fame. He was the second horse inducted into the National Snaffle Bit Association Hall of Fame.
