= NCHA Rider Hall of Fame =

National Cutting Horse Association Rider Hall of Fame

National Cutting Horse Association (NCHA) Rider Hall of Fame was created and perpetuated to honor outstanding riders who have demonstrated their ability to exhibit the athletic prowess and inherent cow sense of the cutting horses they have shown competitively in NCHA sponsored or approved contests. The updated criteria established in 2016 includes:

- Win any 2 of the following designated events: NCHA Futurity, Super Stakes, Derby, World Champion
- Win any 3 of the following designated events: Super Stakes Classic, 5/6 year old Classic/Challenge, Reserve World Champion.
- A win in category 1 plus 2 wins in category 2.
- Ride horses ranking in the NCHA Top Five Open Cutting horses five (5) times. A rider must win 90% of the qualifying money to receive credit.
- Exceed $1,000,000 in NCHA lifetime earnings.

In addition to their Rider Hall of Fame - Open Division, the NCHA established the Non-Pro Division as well as the following: NCHA Members Hall of Fame, NCHA Horse Hall of Fame, Youth Hall of Fame and Horse of the Year.

== Rider Hall of Fame Honorees - Open Division ==
- Charlie Ashcraft, Sulphur Springs, TX
- Leroy Ashcraft, Decatur, TX
- Clint Allen, Weatherford, TX
- Adan Banuelos, Crescent, TX
- Ascencion Banuelos, Jacksboro, TX
- Keith Barnett, Brenham, TX
- Tracy Barton, Penhook, VA
- Jeremy Barwick, Stephenville, TX
- Gary Bellenfant, DeLeon, TX
- Milt Bennett, Tyler, TX
- Todd Bimat, Orland, CA
- Dirk Blakesley, Augusta, KS
- Sandy Bonelli, Petaluma, CA
- Gayle Borland, Santo, TX
- Pete Branch, Farwell, TX
- Eddie Braxton, Olar, SC
- Matthew Budge, Weatherford, TX
- Lindy Burch, Weatherford, TX
- Bob Burton, Arlington, TX
- Jimmy Bush, Denton, TX
- Stanley Bush, Mason, TX
- Jim Calhoun, Cresson, TX
- Rusty Carroll, Edna, TX
- John Carter, Clermont, FL
- Roy Carter, Hempstead, TX
- Jason Clark, Whitt, TX
- R. L. Chartier, Weatherford, TX
- Randy Chartier, Weatherford, TX
- Michael Cooper, Weatherford, TX
- David Costello, Paso Robles, CA
- Lloyd Cox ||Fort Morgan, CO
- Morgan Cromer, Templeton, CA
- Allen Crouch, Noxapater, MS
- Kathy Daughn, Archer City, TX
- Brett Davis, Texarkana, TX
- Keith Deaville, Covington, LA
- Don Dodge, Phoenix, AZ
- Ed Dufurrena, Gainesville, TX
- Tom Dvorak, Weatherford, TX
- Pat Earnheart, Hernando, MS
- Zeke Entz, Collierville, TN
- J. T. Fisher, Moultrie, GA
- Ed Flynn, Lipan, TX
- Sean Flynn, Weatherford, TX
- Lee Francois, Murchison, TX
- Bill Freeman, Rosston, TX
- Shorty Freeman, Era, TX
- David Gage, Olathe, CO
- Dick Gaines, Byers, TX
- Matt Gaines, Weatherford, TX
- Jody Galyean, Ardmore, OK
- Todd Gann, Leighton, AL
- Jim Gideon, Montgomery, AL
- George Glascock, Cresson, TX
- Dustin Gonnet, Alberta, Canada
- Gary Gonsalves, Wilton, CA
- T.J. Good, Marietta, OK
- Shannon Hall, Minco, OK
- Gerry Hansma, Granum, AB Canada
- Paul Hansma, Weatherford, TX
- Winston Hansma, Weatherford, TX
- Philip Hanson, Prineville, OR
- Leon Harrel, Kerrville, TX
- Rock Hedlund, Acampo, CA
- Joe Heim, Thackerville, OK
- Faron Hightower, Buff Dale, TX
- Roy Huffaker, Kerrville, TX
- Minor Johnson, Coleman, TX
- Doug Jordan, Greenville, TX
- Beau Galyean, Fort Worth, TX
- Wesley Galyean, Claremore, OK
- Clay Johnson, Weatherford, TX
- Gavin Jordan, Wilton, CA
- Mark Lavender, Brenham, TX
- Jim Lee, Iowa Park, TX
- Jesse Lennox, Aledo, TX
- Tom Long, Garnerville, TX
- Tom Lyons, Grandview, TX
- Scott Martin, Terrebonne, OR
- Tommy Marvin, Barnsdall, OK
- Charles "Bubba" Matlock, Weatherford, TX
- David McGregor, Santa Ynez, CA
- J. B. McLamb, Weatherford, TX
- Glenn McWhorter, Thockmorton, TX
- Matt Miller, Poolville, TX
- Russ Miller, Saint Anthony, ID
- Mark Mills, Fulshear, TX
- James Bradley Mitchell, Thompson Station, TN
- Jim Mitchell, Danville, IN
- John Mitchell, Weatherford, TX
- Denton Moffat, Armstrong BC, Canada
- Craig Morris, Weatherford, TX
- Mike Mowery, Millsap, TX
- Ronnie Nettles, Madisonville, TX
- Jack Newton, Krum, TX
- Steve Oehlhof, Corsicana, TX
- Kenny Patterson, Normangee, TX
- L. M. (Pat) Patterson, Tecumseh, OK
- James Payne, Overbrook, OK
- H. J. "Sonny" Perry, Ward, TX
- Kenny Platt, Fort Lupton, CO
- Don Pooley, Bebe, TX
- Kory Pounds, Lipan, TX
- Phil Rapp, Weatherford, TX
- Larry Reeder, Stephenville, TX
- Boyd Rice, Spearman, TX
- Ronnie Rice, Crockett, TX
- Sonny Rice, Sealy, TX
- Tag Rice, Buffalo, NY
- Tarin Rice, Centerville, TX
- Tatum Rice, Weatherford, TX
- Willie Richardson, Santa Rosa, NM
- Bill Riddle, Ringling, OK
- Terry Riddle, Wynnewood, OK
- Johnathan Rogers, Rockdale, TX
- Matlock Rose, Aubrey, TX
- Billy Ray Rosewell, Cookville, TX
- Robert Rust, Gordon, TX
- Matt Sargood, Millsap, TX
- Grant Setnicka, Grandview, TX
- L. E. Shawyer, Dallas, TX
- Austin Shepard, Summerdale, AL
- Sam Shepard, Magnolia Spring, AL
- Bobby Sikes, Dublin, TX
- Darren Simpkins, Weatherford, TX
- B. A. Skipper, Longview, TX
- Greg Smith, Cedar City, UT
- Tim Smith, Temecula, CA
- Corky Sokol, Chappell Hill, TX
- Jon Steelman, Eatonville, WA
- Dave Stewart, Wynnewood, OK
- Gene Suiter, Los Olivos, CA
- Craig Thompson, Buffalo, TX
- John Tolbert, South Bend, TX
- Curly Tully, Goldwaithe, TX
- Chubby Turner, Weatherford, TX
- Roger Wagner, Weatherford, TX
- Greg Ward, Kingsburg, CA
- Scott Weis, Ojai, CA
- Buster Welch, Rotan, TX
- Greg Welch, Milsap, TX
- Russ Westfall, Los Olivos, TX
- Philip Williams, Tokio, TX
- Bronc Willoughby, Nocona, TX
- Sam Wilson, Pattison, TX
- John Wold, Argyle, TX
- Kobie Wood, Stephenville, TX
- Mike Wood, Scottsdale, AZ
- Guy Woods, Pilot Point, TX

== Rider Hall of Fame Honorees - Non-Pro Division ==
The Non-Pro requirements to be inducted in the Non-Pro Rider Hall of Fame began with earnings of $35,000 in NCHA Championship Non-Pro cutting events, a Gold certificate for the rider and a plaque mounted in the NCHA office. Eligible riders had previously received the Platinum, Gold, Silver and Bronze Awards. In 1981, the monies earned was raised to $100,000 and then to $150,000 in 1985.

- Austin Blake (2018)
- Ashley Flynn (2018)
- Kelsey Weeks Johnson (2018)
- Steve Norris (2018)
- Kylie Knight Rice (2018)
- Bradley Rodgers (2018)
- Kade Smith (2018)
- April Widman (2018)
- Brad Wilson (2018)
- Priscilla Crawley Wilson (2018)
- Ray Baldwin (2017)
- Joel Cohen (2017)
- Christina Cox (2017)
- Nadine Payne (2017)
- Elizabeth Quirk (2017)
- William Cowan (2016)
- Cody Hedlund (2016)
- Nelson Glade Knight (2016)
- Ty Moore (2016)
- Cade Shepard (2016)
- Dix Turnbow (2016)
- Kaitlyn Wimberly (2016)
- Kelsey Conn (2015)
- Kristen Galyean (2015)
- Constance Jaeggi (2015)
- Alexis Carissa Stephas (2015)
- Carol Anderson Ward (2015)
- Steve Anderson (2014)
- Kate Banuelos (2014)
- Dick Cogdell (2014)
- Jim Cogdell (2014)
- Brandon Duferrena (2014)
- Dean Holden (2014)
- Bill Lacy (2014)
- Stacie McDavid (2014)
- Armando Costa Neto (2014)
- Lauren Middleton Chartier (2013)
- Sandra McBride (2013)
- Clay McCuller (2013)
- Jo Ellard (2012)
- Glade Knight (2012)
- Jill Long (2012)
- Megan Miller (2012)
- Michelle Anderson (2011)
- Bonnie Martin (2011)
- Julie Wrigley (2011)
- Lindy Ashlock (2010)
- Spunky Hawkins (2010)
- Billy Martin (2010)
- Lach Perks (2010)
- Stacy Shepardn (2010)
- Mary Bradford (2008)
- Kelli Earnheart (2008)
- Beau Galyean (2008)
- Dan Hansen (2008)
- Edley Hixson Jr (2008)
- Gail Hooper (2008)
- James Hooper (2008)
- Stephanie Hoymes (2008)
- Amy Welch King (2008)
- Kyle Manion (2008)
- George Manor (2008)
- Matt Miller (2008)
- Mark Pearson (2008)
- Justin White (2008)
- Tim Barry (2007)
- Kelle Chartier (2007)
- Wesley Galyean (2007)
- Linda Holmes (2007)
- Dick Thompson (2007)
- Janet Westfall (2007)
- Lewie Wood Jr. (2007)
- Kevin Arnold (2006)
- Jon Cates (2006)
- Roy Harden (2006)
- Bobby Lewis (2006)
- Tommy Minton (2006)
- McKenzie Mullins (2006)
- Wes Shahan (2006)
- James Vangilder (2005)
- Dustin Adams (2005)
- Alycia Bellenfant (2005)
- Sandy Bonelli (2005)
- Chad Bushaw (2005)
- Greg Coalson (2005)
- Craig Crumpler (2005)
- Paul Crumpler (2005)
- Scott Ferguson (2005)
- Carl Gerwein (2005)
- Robin Haack (2005)
- Julie Hansma (2005)
- Spencer Harden (2005)
- Lance Harrel (2005)
- Bucki James (2005)
- Cindy Love (2005)
- Tommy Manion (2005)
- Hope Mitchell (2005)
- Benjie Neely (2005)
- Bobby Pidgeon (2005)
- Elizabeth Queen (2005)
- Dean Sanders (2005)
- Merritt Wilson (2004)
- Chad Gann (2003)
- Robert C. Brown (2003)
- Waddy Hills (2002)
- Tim May (2001)
- Lonnie Allsup (2001)
- Joey Milner (2000)
- Eddie Stewart (1999)
- Jimmy Kemp (1999)
- Roger Peters (1999)
- Wade Rust (1998)
- Mary Ann Rapp (1998)
- Joe Howard Williamson (1997)
- Jodie Boone (1997)
- Bobby Kennedy (1997)
- Wayne Long (1997)
- Linda Mussallem (1997)
- Paula Wood (1995)
- Ben Ingram (1995)
- L. H. Wood (1994)
- Don Boone (1994)
- Kathy Boone (1993)
- Lee Garner (1992)
- Ernest Cannon (1992)
- Phil Rapp (1991)
- Kay Floyd (1991)
- Dan Lufkin (1991)
- Julie Roddy (1990)
- Paige Alexander (1989)
- Phil Feinberg (1989)
- Wayland Long (1989)
- Debbie Patterson (1986)
- Mitch Farris (1985)
- George W. Glover (1983)
- Carl M. Crawford (1983)
- John Paxton (1980)
- Richard Andersen (1980)
- Billy Baker (1980)
- M.L. Chartier (1980)
- Dick Gaines (1980)
- Tom Hastings (1980)
- Lee Holsey Jr (1980)
- Mike Kelly (1980)
- Mary Jo Milner (1980)
- Margie Suiter (1980)
- Sheila Welch (1979)
- Charlie Ashcraft (1979)
- Norman Bruce (1979)
- Randy Chartier (1979)
- Tommy Moore (1979)
- Gil Porter (1979)
- Mary Jo Reno (1979)
- Larry Shearin (1978)
- David Gage (1976)
- Jim Milner (1976)
- Carol Rose (1976)
