= National Snaffle Bit Association Hall of Fame =

Equestrian organization

- Established: 1983
- Location: Weatherford, TX
- Type: Hall of fame
- Website: NSBA

This List of National Snaffle Bit Association Hall of Fame Inductees was created by the National Snaffle Bit Association (NSBA) for the NSBA Hall of Fame to recognize extraordinary athletes, individuals, riders, and horses, in the equestrian sport of Pleasure riding. The NSBA Hall of Fame started inducting members into the hall of fame 1988. The hall of fame was created to recognize these individuals who have contributed significantly to the association. The hall of fame features those who have exerted themselves in maintaining a high level of integrity while advocating for the industry. NSBA members who have impacted the association in a profound manner are considered. Roles such as promoter, breeder, competitor, trainer, and other contributors who donated their time and expertise to assist the association. It is located with the NSBA in Weatherford, Texas. The NSBA Announces 2018 Hall Of Fame Honorees.

== Inductees ==
=== Equine ===
The NSAB has an alliance with American Quarter Horse Association. Some of the NSAB Hall of Fame horses are also American Quarter Horse Hall of Fame members.

==== Breeding Horse Award Winners ====
Induction Year	Horse Name	AQHA Reference
2022	Don't Skip Zip	
2022	Ill Be Dun Won It	
2021	Hot N Blazing	
2020	Radical Rodder	
2019	Vested Pine	
2018	Dynamic	Deluxe
2017	Sweat Taking Chip	
2016	Good Version	
2015	Investment Asset	
2014	Paleface Doll	
2013	Skys Blue Boy	
2012	Potential Investment	
2011	Zippo Jack Bar	
2010	Blazing Hot	
2010	Goddess of Love	
2009	Artful Move	
2009	Last Detail	
2008	Invitation Only	
2007	Boston Sonara	
2007	Delea Siemon	
2007	Sonny Reynolds	
2006	A Sudden Impulse	
2005	January Investment	
2004	Impulsions	
2003	Don't Skip Charlie	
2003	Tamara Wess	
2002	Scotch Bar Time	
2002	Stylish Cook	
2001	Ima Blister Bug	
2000	Zippos Mr. Good Bar	
1999	Zips Chocolate Chip	

==== Show Horse Award Winners ====
Induction Year	Horse Name	AQHA Ref
2022	A Certified Edition	
2021	Cool Krymsun Lady	
2020	Whatscookngoodlookin	
2019	One Hot Krymsun	
2018	A Certain Vino	
2017	Zippos Ace of Spades	
2016	Radical Rumors	
2015	Harley D Zip	
2014	Ruler I Am	
2013	Majestic Scotch	
2012	Hes Just To Sharp	
2011	Hope By Invitation	
2010	Potential Diva	
2009	One Red Hot Zip	
2008	Zippo Ltd	
2007	Acadamosby Award	
2007	Delea Siemon	
2007	Flashy Zipper	
2007	Socks by Sonny	
2007	Sonny Reynolds	
2007	Vested Faith	
2007	Zippos Sensation	
2006	Don't Skip Ms Hotrod	
2005	Light Cruiser	
2004	Impulsions	
2003	Ms MBJ Mudlark	
2002	Zippos Amblin Easy	
2001	Sabrina Lee	
2000	Zippos Mr Good Bar	
1999	Zips Chocolate Chip	

==== Horse Award Winners from 1988-1998 ====
Induction Year	Horse Name	Ref
1998	The Big Investment	
1997	Ima Big Leaguer	
1997	Zippo by Moonlight	
1996	Wesley Playboy	
1996	Zippo Pat Bars	
1995	Mr Zippo Pine	
1995	Tiger Leo	
1994	The Invester	
1993	Hotrodders Jet Set	
1992	Zippo Pine Bar	
1990	Lady Barbie Sox	
1989	Pecho Dexter	
1988	Scottish	

=== Individuals ===
Induction Year	Inductee Name
1989	Leo Barbera
1989	Walter Hughes
1992	Joe Geeslin
1992	Tom Powers
1995	Ohio Quarter Horse Association
2000	American Quarter Horse Association
2001	Jody Galyean
2002	Gary Trubee
2003	Archie Kelly
2004	Jack Bound
2005	American Paint Horse Association
2005	Connie Hill
2006	Tom Chown
2007	Vic Clark
2008	Jim Dudley
2009	Bob and Ann Perv
2010	Debbie Popp Hubbard
2011	Kenneth Banks
2012	Suzy Jeane
2013	June Warren
2014	Stephen Stephens
2015	Fritz and Carole Leeman
2016	The Hannagan Family
2017	Leslie Lange
2018	Bill Price
2019	BSB – R11 Quarter Horses, Hedy Levin, Shelley & Kim Donovan
2020	Allen Mitchels
2021	Nancy Sue Ryan
2020	Doug Carpenter

=== Riders ===
Induction Year	Induction Name
2000	Jon Barry
2000	Gil Galyean
2000	Keith Whistle
2001	Steve Heckaman
2001	Cleve Wells
2006	Ty Hornick
2008	Trisha Yamber
2008	Randy R. Wilson
2008	Tina Kaven
2009	Kenny Larkins
2010	Beth Case
2010	Shane Dowdy
2010	Jay Starnes

=== Horse of the Year ===
Award Year	Horse Name
1998	Lotto Flash
1999	Dont Gamble
2000	Zippos Cowgirl
2001	Radical Rumors
2002	Sky Blue Summer
2003	Vested Faith
2004	Potential Diva
2005	Hot Lopin Louise
2006	Majestic Scotch
2007	Vital Signs Are Good
2008	BlazinMyTroublesAway
2009	GoodCowboyMargarita
2010	BlazinMyTroublesAway
2011	WhatsGookigGoodLookin
2012	Hunting Big Dreams
2013	Huntin My Zipper
2014	N/A
2015	Rock Country Kid
2016	Lexus Made Lady
2017	Made N The Shade

=== Quarter Million Dollar Club ===
Inductee Year	Inductee Name
2000	Jon Barry
2000	Gil Gaylean
2000	Keith Whistle
2001	Steve Heckaman
2001	Cleve Wells
2006	Ty Hornick
2008	Trisha Yamber
2008	Randy R. Wilson
2008	Tina Kaven
2008	Rusty Green
2009	Kenny Lakins
2010	Beth Case
2010	Shane Dowdy
2010	Jay Starnes
2010	Judy Davis
2010	Katy Jo Davis
2010	Karen Hornick
2010	Nancy Sue Ryan
2010	Susan Scott
2013	Dawn Baker
2014	Brian Baker
2014	Angie Ridgon Cannizzaro
2014	Andy Cochran
2014	Bret Parrish
2014	Kristy Starnes
2017	Cole Baker
2017	Deanna Searles
2018	Jason Martin

=== Top Money Earners ===
The top money earners are tracked for lifetime earnings as follows:

NSBA Top 20 lifetime earners are tracked in the following disciplines:

- Open Hunter Under Saddle
- Open Western Pleasure
- Open Western Riding
- Open Trail
- Non-Pro Hunter Under Saddle
- Non-Pro Western Pleasure
- Non-Pro Western Riding
- Non-Pro Trail
- Open Yearling Longe Line
- Non-Pro Yearling Longe Line

And the top 50 lifetime earners are tracking in the following disciplines:

- Open
- NonPro

== See also ==
- Horse show
- National Reining Horse Association
- National Reining Horse Association Hall of Fame
- National Reining Horse Association Champions and Awards
- National Reined Cow Horse Association
- National Reined Cow Horse Association Champions
- National Reined Cow Horse Association Hall of Fame
- Western riding
- Western saddle
