= Marion Flynt =

American cattle rancher and cutting horse competitor

Marion Flynt (1904 - 1987) was a cattle rancher and owner of the Square Top 3 Ranch in Midland, TX., home to many legendary horses including two foundation cutting horse sires, Jewel's Leo Bars (Freckles) and Rey Jay. Flynt was known in cutting horse circles as "Mr. Cutting Horse". He holds the record as the longest serving president of the National Cutting Horse Association (NCHA), (1956–58, 1963–1971), having served a total of 12 years. Flynt was inducted into the NCHA Members Hall of Fame in 1977. He was the owner of Marion’s Girl, a 1948 bay Quarter Horse mare and twice NCHA World Champion Cutting Horse, trained and shown by Buster Welch.
