= Poco Pine =

Quarter Horse show horse and stallion

- Breed: Quarter Horse
- Discipline: Halter
- Sire: Poco Bueno
- Grandsire: King P-234
- Dam: Pretty Rosalie
- Maternal grandsire: Pretty Boy
- Sex: Stallion
- Foaled: 1954
- Country: United States
- Color: Bay
- Breeder: E. Paul Waggoner
- Owner: Paul Curtner

Honors
- American Quarter Horse Hall of Fame

Poco Pine (1954–1974) was an American Quarter Horse stallion and breeding stallion. He earned 50 Grand Championships in his showing career and, after his death, was inducted into the American Quarter Horse Association's (or AQHA) AQHA Hall of Fame in 2010. Two of his descendants have also been inducted into the AQHA Hall of Fame. Thirty-seven of his offspring earned an AQHA Championship during their own showing careers.

== Life ==
Poco Pine was a 1954 bay stallion, sired by Poco Bueno, and out of Pretty Rosalie, (Note: "Out of" in horse terminology designates the mother of the horse. In this case, this means that Pretty Rosalie was Poco Pine's mother.) a daughter of Pretty Boy. As a foal, he was bought at E. Paul Waggoner's 1954 Waggoner Ranch sale by Paul Curtner. Curtner had initially intended to purchase a daughter of Blackburn and a filly by Poco Bueno, but instead ended up purchasing two different horses – a mare by Pretty Boy (Pretty Rosalie) and a colt by Poco Bueno (Poco Pine). While still at the sale, Curtner was approached by two employees of Waggoner's, both informing Curtner that, in their opinion, he'd bought the best mare in the sale. One of the employees, Pine Johnson, Waggoner's trainer, also felt the colt was the best Poco Bueno colt he'd ever seen. Because of Johnson's praise for the colt, Curtner decided to register the foal as Poco Pine.

== Show career ==
Poco Pine was shown about five times as a weanling, winning all the halter classes he was shown in. Curtner, however, felt that he was slow to develop and therefore didn't show him as a yearling or as a two-year-old. By 1957, Curtner felt Poco Pine was again ready to perform and took him to a show in Fort Worth, Texas. Although Poco Pine won his class, Curtner was sure the horse wouldn't win either Grand Champion or Reserve Grand Champion and ended up betting B. F. Phillips and Billy Bush that Poco Pine would not win the championship or reserve. Poco Pine won the Championship, which meant that Curtner lost money on his horse winning.

Curtner's goal with Poco Pine's halter career was to have the stallion win fifty Grand Championships, a goal the stallion accomplished on October 27, 1960, when he was six years old. Curtner then retired the horse from halter showing. While Poco Pine was showing at halter, he was also showing in cutting competitions and standing at stud to a large book of mares. In 1958, for example, he bred eighty mares at a stud fee of $800 (equivalent to $8,900 in 2025) as well as showing both halter and cutting. In August 1960, Poco Pine earned enough performance points to qualify for an AQHA Championship and was retired from performance showing. In total, Poco Pine earned 135 AQHA Halter points and 17 AQHA Performance points.

Curtner had two opportunities to sell Poco Pine during his showing career—the first time for $40,000 (equivalent to $446,400 in 2025), the second for $100,000 (equivalent to $1,115,900 in 2025) —but both times he turned the offers down.

== Breeding career ==
Poco Pine's foals earned $14,794 in National Cutting Horse Association competition. He sired 37 AQHA Champions, 19 Superior Western Pleasure Horses, 2 Superior Trail Horses, 15 Superior Halter Horses, 84 Performance Registers of Merit and 4 year end high point horses with the AQHA. He sired 19 foal crops, with a total of 464 foals. His son Poco Pecho was the sire of Pecho Dexter, who was inducted into the AQHA Hall of Fame. Another descendant inducted into the Hall of Fame was Zippo Pine Bar, who was out of a Poco Pine daughter.

== Death and honors ==
Poco Pine died in his sleep on November 1, 1974. He was inducted into the AQHA Hall of Fame in 2010.

== Pedigree ==
Zantanon
King P-234
Jabalina
Poco Bueno
Old Poco Bueno
Miss Taylor
mare
Poco Pine
Dodger
Pretty Boy
Little Maud
Pretty Rosalie
unknown
Waggoner mare
unknown
