= National Survey of Black Americans =

Nationally representative survey of black American adults

The National Survey of Black Americans (abbreviated NSBA) was the first nationally representative cross-sectional survey of black adults in the United States. Developed by the Program for Research on Black Americans at the University of Michigan Institute for Social Research, it was originally funded by the National Institute of Mental Health's Center for the Study of Minority Group Mental Health in 1977. It was conducted from 1979 to 1980, during which time it interviewed 2,107 black American adults (aged 18 or older). The respondents were later re-contacted three times: eight, nine, and twelve years after the first interviews. The original and follow-up interview together comprise the National Panel Survey of Black Americans (NPSBA).

According to the 2008 International Encyclopedia of the Social Sciences, the NSBA has remained highly influential to policymakers and sociologists since it was originally conducted. The NSBA "produced the first national data on how symptoms of distress are defined and responded to by black Americans." It was followed up by the National Survey of American Life, which was also sponsored by the National Institutes of Mental Health.
