= Oklahoma Star =

Quarter Horse racehorse and sire

Oklahoma Star P-6
- Breed: Quarter Horse
- Discipline: Racing
- Sire: Dennis Reed (TB)
- Grandsire: Lobos (TB)
- Dam: Cutthroat
- Maternal grandsire: Gulliver
- Sex: Stallion
- Foaled: 1915
- Country: United States
- Color: Bay
- Breeder: Tommy Moore
- Owner: Tommy Moore, Ronald Mason

Honors
- American Quarter Horse Hall of Fame

For many years, Oklahoma Star (1915–1943) was known simply as the Tommy Moore Horse, after his breeder, owner, trainer and race jockey. He was an influential Quarter Horse stallion in the early days of the breed.

== Life ==
Oklahoma Star was foaled in 1915 in Oklahoma and raced in match races for many years throughout Oklahoma. He was bred by Tommy Moore of Oklahoma. Eventually, he was registered with the American Quarter Horse Association (or AQHA), as number 6 in the AQHA's stud book. His stud book entry gives his breeding as being sired by Dennis Reed, a Thoroughbred, with a first dam being Cutthroat by Gulliver by Missouri Rondo. The second dam was given as OK by Dan Tucker. However, this is a corrected entry. The original entry had the same sire and dam, but the original entry had Cutthroat by Bonnie Joe, a Thoroughbred and out of Big Em by Rocky Mountain Tom. Cutthroat's breeding still remains somewhat murky, as Moore was evasive about her exact breeding.

== Racing career ==
Moore raced Oklahoma Star all over Oklahoma, matching him against all comers, usually riding the horse himself because of fears that the opposing side would bribe the jockey. Because Moore was almost fifty years old and weighed about 150 pounds, this meant that Oklahoma Star didn't always win every race, but he won enough. Ronald Mason, who later owned the horse, told Robert Denhardt that the best race distance for the stallion was an eighth of a mile. Oklahoma Star was a mahogany bay in color, with just a white star on his forehead, a small white spot on his left foreleg, and a white sock on his left hind leg.

== Breeding record and death ==
Eventually, Moore was forced to sell Oklahoma Star, and after passing through a few other owners, eventually the horse was sold to Ronald Mason of Nowata, Oklahoma, who registered him with the AQHA. He died in the ownership of Ronald Mason on February 14, 1943.

Among Oklahoma Star's famous offspring were Nowata Star, Star Deck, Oklahoma Star Jr and Sizzler. Two of his foals earned Race Register of Merits with the AQHA – M's Grey Lady and Sizzler. Many of his daughters went on to produce racehorses or show horses.

== Honors ==
Oklahoma Star was inducted into the AQHA Hall of Fame in 1992.

== Pedigree ==
=Bend Or (TB)
*Golden Garter (TB)
=Sandal (TB)
Lobos (TB)
*Cheviot (TB)
Temblor (TB)
Vibrate (TB)
Dennis Reed (TB)
Pardee (TB)
Proteinol (TB)
*Clara (TB)
Bess Chitman (TB)
Euchre (TB)
Chickweed (TB)
Chickwick (TB)
Oklahoma Star P-6
Missouri Mike
Missouri Rondo
unknown
Gulliver
unknown
Cutthroat
Barney Owens
Dan Tucker
Lady Bug (Butt Cut)
Belle K
unknown
Sleepy Kate
unknown
