= All American Quarter Horse Congress =

Single-breed horse show

Coordinates: 40°00′00″N 82°59′35″W

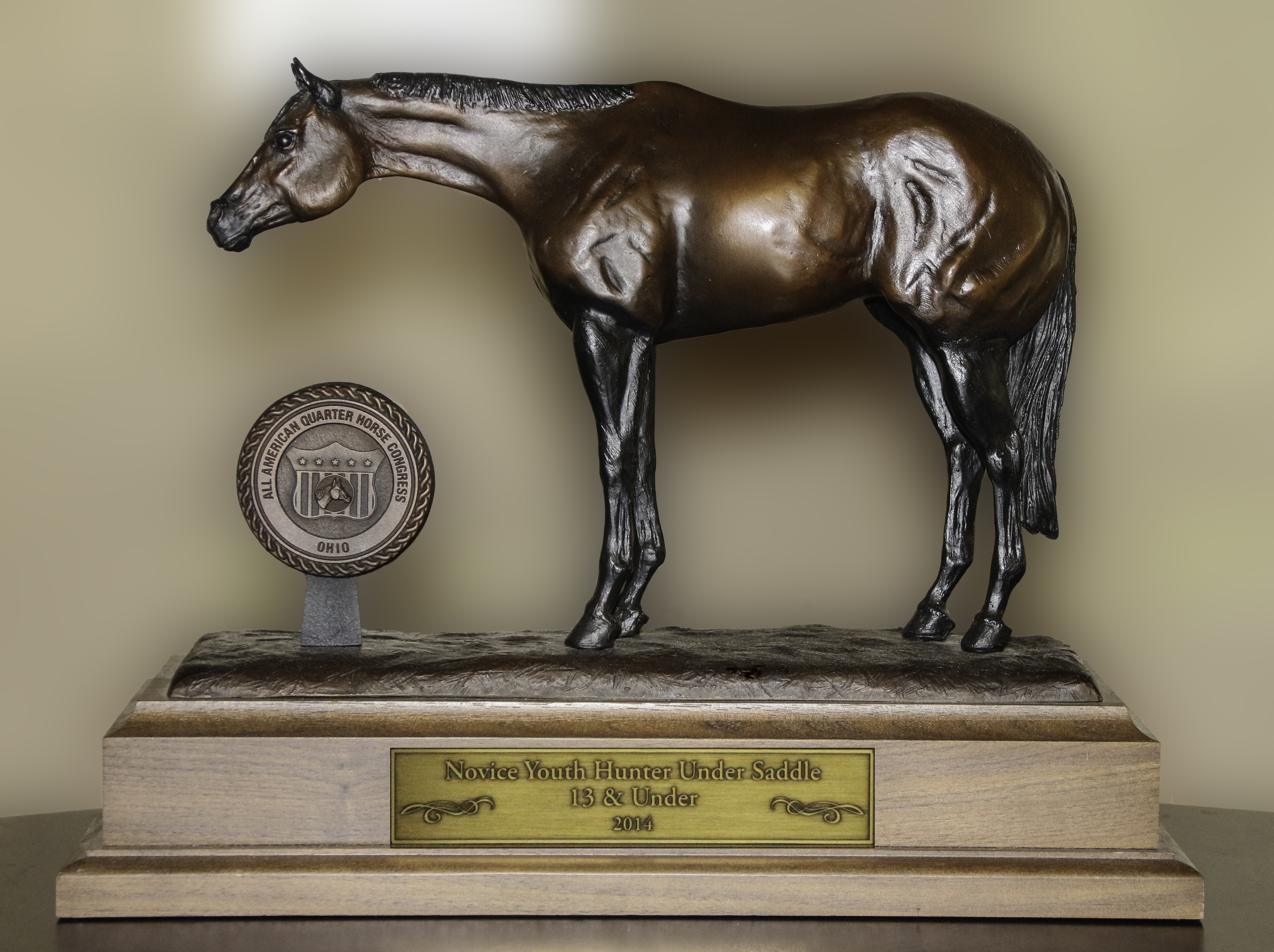
- All American Quarter Horse Congress trophy
- Abbreviation: AAQHC
- Formation: 3 November 1967
- Founder: Former Ohio Quarter Horse Association president, Blair Folck
- Founded at: Richwood, Ohio
- Purpose: Quarter Horse halter and performance horse show
- Location: Ohio Expo Center, Columbus, Ohio
- Website: www.quarterhorsecongress.com

The All American Quarter Horse Congress (AAQHC) is known as the largest single breed horse show in the world. The annual event is held at the 360 acre Ohio Expo Center and State Fairgrounds in Columbus, Ohio, and is hosted by the Ohio Quarter Horse Association (OQHA). The AAQHC has multiple events in a variety of disciplines. Points and cash awards earned by individual exhibitors who are members of the AQHA, the NRHA, and/or the NSBA also count toward accumulative totals for year-end awards and recognition in the respective associations to which exhibitors are members.

== History ==
The idea for a Quarter Horse-only competition event in Ohio was proposed at an Ohio Quarter Horse Association (OQHA) meeting in 1966 by horse breeder Blair Folck, and promoted by Folck and OQHA president Pete Drake. The result was the first Annual AAQHC, a three-day Quarter Horse show event held November 3–5, 1967, which attracted more than 5,000 attendees.

In 2014 the AAQHC had grown to a three-week-long event, the world’s largest single-breed horse show. Its events managed more than 17,000 entries and housing was needed for nearly 6,000 registered American Quarter Horses. However, that year there was concern that the event was outgrowing its venue. All American Quarter Horse Congress officials reported to the Ohio Expositions Commission that the show spends $700,000 each year on temporary stall and tent rental. The congress had a 10-year contract with the commission, which ran through 2015 and, by the time of the 2014 show, negotiations had not yet begun for its renewal.

By 2015, the show had grown again into a 25-day event with over 25,000 horse show entries. According to statistics made available by the OQHA, the AAQHC has attracted over 650,000 people to Columbus, Ohio and generates some $409 million to the economy of central Ohio.

== Competitions ==
The AAQHC organizes point-earning competitions in a variety of disciplines that also offer cash awards and various other prizes. Competition categories included mounted shooting, barrel racing and pole bending.

Individual exhibitors who are members of the AQHA, the NRHA, and/or the NSBA can add their points and cash awards to toward cumulative totals for year-end awards and recognition in these associations.
