= National Snaffle Bit Association =

American equestrian organization

- Sport: Pleasure riding
- Founded: 1983
- Countries: United States
- Most recent champion: (United States) Dynamic Deluxe
- Website: NSBA

The National Snaffle Bit Association (NSBA) is an equestrian organization in the United States that began by promoting and staging Western Pleasure events in 1983. Since then, focus has expanded to promoting the show horse at every level across multiple disciplines. The association is currently headquartered in Weatherford, Texas, United States.

== Organization ==
=== Breeders Championship Futurity ===
The Breeders Championship Futurity is a futurity competition held annually in conjunction with the NSBA World Championship Show. There are over 40 BCF classes.

=== Stakes classes ===
There are five stakes shows offered at the World Show. All recognized breeds are eligible to compete. Awards are given to the top 10 in each class. Prizes are money and a jackpot.

=== Hall of Fame ===
The National Snaffle Bit Association Hall of Fame was created to recognize extraordinary athletes, individuals, riders, and horses in the show horse industry. These inductees are tracked in a separate article.

== See also ==
- National Reining Horse Association
- National Reined Cow Horse Association
