= Cutting horse =

Trained stock horse with athletic ability and cow sense

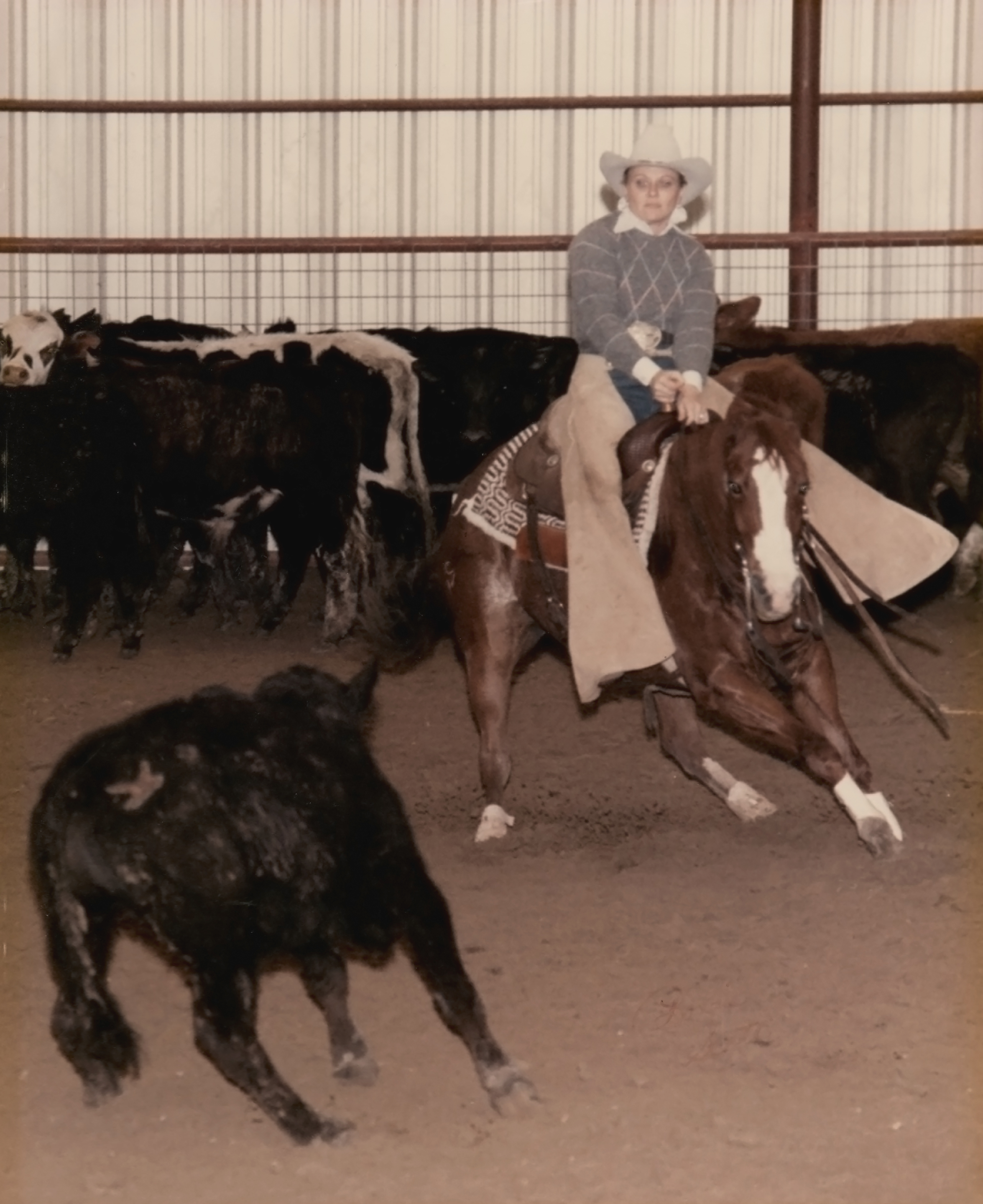
- Trained cutting horse being shown in cutting horse competition. The horse's job is to keep the separated cow from returning to the herd.
- Other names: Cow horse
- Country of origin: United States

Traits
- Distinguishing features: Cow sense, athletic ability, strength, speed and endurance.

A cutting horse is a stock horse, typically an American Quarter Horse, bred and trained for cutting, a modern equestrian competition requiring a horse and rider to separate a single cow from a herd of cattle and prevent it from getting back to the herd. One of the desired qualities in a cutting horse is "cow sense," described as an innate ability to read a cow, eye to eye, in anticipation of each move. The cutting horse has its roots in the historic cattle ranching industry, where horses with specialized cattle-handling skills were crucial for the work of the cowboy.

== History ==
Cattle ranching in the Southwestern US was first introduced by early settlers in the 17th century. By late 19th century, cattle trading was an industry; thereby making cutting horses an indispensable tool of the trade. Large herds of cattle grazed freely on the open ranges, and any strays that wandered off would typically join the herds of other cattle ranchers. As a result, cattle roundups became an annual or semi-annual routine. Cowhands kept a remuda of horses whenever they traveled, with some horses having specialized skills to ensure they had the right horse for assorted herding jobs. Horses that showed a unique awareness of cattle, a kind of wariness with ears perked and eyes focused on the herd, were the elite members of the remuda. Horses with this "cow sense" helped separate one or more cows from a herd, allowing cowboys to finish their work quicker and easier. Ranch hands held informal competitions to see who had the best horse, which also added a measure of fun to the work.

It was worth the trip to brush country just to sit above Ol' Gotch and feel his shoulders roll, watch his ears work and his head drop low when he looked an old steer in the eye.

— Will Rogers (1920s), In the beginning, there was the horse . . . NCHA History

Over time, many large cattle operations were either sold to developers or divided into smaller farms and ranches. Mechanical devices, such as squeeze chutes, eliminated the need for cowboys on cutting horses to separate a single cow from the herd for routine maintenance such as deworming, spraying, and annual vaccinations. Motorized vehicles, such as ATVs, trucks and in some cases helicopters, replaced horses for overseeing and rounding up cattle. In many situations, modern equipment can locate and move a herd of cattle much faster using fewer ranch hands. Large ranches in the 21st century have come to depend less on stock horses for cattle roundups and routine livestock handling; however, some ranches continue to use horses for various reasons.

== Competition ==
Like other ranch disciplines, such as roping, reining, and various other Western stock horse events, cutting evolved during the 20th century from being a ranch necessity to a sporting event held in horse show arenas. The 1919 Southwestern Exposition and Fat Stock Show in Fort Worth, Texas marked a milestone as the first recorded cutting horse exhibition. Cutting was established as a competitive annual event the following year.

In 1946, the National Cutting Horse Association (NCHA) was founded by a group of 13 cutting horse owners who were attending the Southwestern Exposition and Fat Stock Show. They determined that cutting horse competition should have an established set of rules and procedures to follow. The first NCHA sponsored cutting horse competition was held that same year in Dublin, Texas.
