= Joe Reed II =

Quarter Horse racehorse and sire

- Breed: Quarter Horse
- Discipline: Racing
- Sire: Joe Reed P-3
- Grandsire: Joe Blair (TB)
- Dam: Nellene
- Maternal grandsire: Fleeting Time (TB)
- Sex: Stallion
- Foaled: 1936
- Died: 1964
- Country: United States
- Color: Chestnut
- Breeder: J. W. House

Awards
- 1942 Champion Quarter Running Stallion; AA speed rating speed rating

Honors
- American Quarter Horse Hall of Fame

Joe Reed II (1936–1964) was a Quarter Horse racehorse from the early days of the American Quarter Horse Association (or AQHA) that became an influential sire with the breed.

== Life ==
Joe Reed II was registered number 985 in the AQHA's stud book. He was registered as a chestnut stallion that foaled in 1936. His breeder was recorded as J. W. House of Cameron, Texas, and his owner when he was registered was Bert H. Wood of Tucson, Arizona. He was the son of Joe Reed P-3 and Nellene, a daughter of Fleeting Time (TB). He was over half Thoroughbred by breeding, as both his sire and his dam were by Thoroughbreds. On his dam's side he traced twice to Traveler. His paternal granddam, Della Moore, was a Louisiana bred mare.

Racing career

In 1942 Joe Reed beat the famous Clabber to be proclaimed Champion Quarter Running Stallion. He raced three times that meet, and won all three races. He had a foot injury and the last race he bled from the foot the whole race, but managed to win the race anyway. After his racing career was cut short by that injury, Joe went on to sire such outstanding horses as Leo P-1335, Little Sister W, Joak, Joe Queen, and Tonta Lad.

== Death and honors ==
Joe Reed II died in 1964 at Fort Bridger, Wyoming.

Joe Reed was inducted into the AQHA Hall of Fame in 1994.

== Pedigree ==
Faustus (TB)
Bonnie Joe (TB)
Bonnie Rose (TB)
Joe Blair (TB)
Bowling Green (TB)
Miss Blair (TB)
Com-I-Cut (TB)
Joe Reed P-3
Crazy Cue
Old DJ
Mignon
Della Moore
Shamrock
Belle
Dilly
Joe Reed II
Ultimus (TB)
High Time (TB)
Noonday (TB)
Fleeting Time (TB)
Great Britain (TB)
British Fleet (TB)
Belle Nutter (TB)
Nellene
Pancho
Brown Billy
mare by Traveler
Little Red Nell
Texas Chief by Traveler
Red Nell
Mandy
