= Leo (horse) =

Quarter Horse racehorse and sire

- Breed: Quarter Horse
- Discipline: Racing
- Sire: Joe Reed II
- Grandsire: Joe Reed P-3
- Dam: Little Fanny
- Maternal grandsire: Joe Reed P-3
- Sex: Stallion
- Foaled: 1940
- Country: United States
- Color: Sorrel
- Breeder: J. W. House
- Owner: Bud Warren; John Tillman; Gene Moore

Awards
- A speed rating

Honors
- American Quarter Horse Hall of Fame

Leo (1940–1967) was one of the most influential Quarter Horse sires in the early years of the American Quarter Horse Association (or AQHA).

== Life ==
Leo was foaled in 1940. He was a double grandson of Joe Reed P-3, as both his sire and dam were by Joe Reed P-3. He was registered with the AQHA as number 1335, a sorrel stallion bred by J. W. House of Cameron, Texas and owned by E. M. Salinas of Eagle Pass, Texas.

== Racing career ==
Leo raced in the early years of the American Quarter Racing Association, being rated with an A speed rating and earning a Race Register of Merit in 1944. However, his exact racing record isn't available. He raced mainly at Pawhuska, Oklahoma in the ownership of John W. Tillman. Leo set a track record at Pawhuska, running 300 yards in 16.0 seconds. He is claimed to have won 20 out of 22 match races.

Tillman told Nelson Nye that "He always had a wonderful disposition, is easily handled, was a perfect gate horse, and had the heart and ability to come from behind and outrun good horses." Tillman sold Leo to Gene Moore of Fairfax, Oklahoma, who stood him at stud for a number of years. In 1946 Leo had a trailer accident that nearly cut off both hind legs, he recovered enough to race, but never as well as before. In 1947, Leo ended up in the hands of Bud Warren( of Perry, Oklahoma), who retired him to full-time stud duties. He died in 1967.

== Breeding record ==
Leo was the sire of many outstanding horses, including Miss Meyers, Palleo Pete, Robin Reed, Hygro Leo, Holey Sox, Leo Tag, Leolita, Okie Leo, and Tiger Leo. He sired twenty-four horses that earned an AQHA Championship, and 211 Race Register of Merits. One of his foals, Leo Maudie, earned the highest showing and racing honor the AQHA has when he earned an AQHA Supreme Championship in 1971. He was an outstanding sire of broodmares, many of his daughters going to on produce racehorses as well as show horses.

Leo's daughter Leota W was the 1947 Co-Champion Quarter Running Two-Year-Old Filly. Leola, another daughter, was the first Quarter horse to win three futurities, winning the Oklahoma, Colorado and Wyoming Futurities. His son, Palleo Pete, was the 1954 Champion Quarter Running Stallion.

== Honors ==
Leo was inducted into the AQHA Hall of Fame in 1989.

== Pedigree ==
Bonnie Joe (TB)
Joe Blair (TB)
Miss Blair (TB)
Joe Reed P-3
Old DJ
Della Moore
Belle
Joe Reed II
High Time (TB)
Fleeting Time (TB)
British Fleet (TB)
Nellene
Brown Billy
Little Red Nell
Red Nell
Leo
Bonnie Joe (TB)
Joe Blair (TB)
Miss Blair (TB)
Joe Reed P-3
Old DJ
Della Moore
Belle
Little Fanny
*Alloway (TB)
Ashwell (TB)
*Melton Mowbray (TB)
Fanny Ashwell
unknown
Fanny Richardson
Sister Fanny (TB)
