= Impressive =

Impressive may refer to:

- Impressive (horse), an Appendix American Quarter Horse (1969–1995)
- Impressive dagger moth or Acronicta impressa, a moth of the family Noctuidae
- Impressive syndrome or hyperkalemic periodic paralysis, a genetic disorder that occurs in horses and humans

== Music ==
- Impressive (album), a 1992 studio album by Japanese jazz fusion band T-Square
- "Impressive Instant", a song by American singer-songwriter Madonna from her 2000 studio album Music
- Be Impressive, the debut studio album by Australian indie rock band The Griswolds

== Computer programs ==
- Impressive (presentation program), a simple and open source presentation program (PDF documents, LaTeX slides, digital images)

== See also ==
- Impress (disambiguation)
- Impression (disambiguation)
- Impressionism
- Impressment
