= Joe Cody =

Quarter Horse show horse and sire

- Breed: Quarter Horse
- Discipline: Reining; Cutting
- Sire: Bill Cody
- Grandsire: Wimpy P-1
- Dam: Taboo
- Maternal grandsire: King P-234
- Sex: Stallion
- Foaled: 1952
- Country: United States
- Color: Sorrel
- Breeder: Tom W. Cochrane
- Owner: C. T. Fuller, Robert F. Roberts, Virginia Epes Harper

Other awards
- AQHA Performance Register of Merit; AQHA Champion

Honors
- American Quarter Horse Hall of Fame; National Reining Horse Association Hall of Fame

Joe Cody (1952–1989) was a Quarter Horse stallion famous for siring reining horses.

== Life ==
Joe Cody was registered with number 42,543 in the American Quarter Horse Association (or AQHA). He was a 1952 sorrel colt, bred by Tom W. Cochran of Buckholts, Texas. He was registered in the ownership of Robert F. Roberts of Tyler, Texas. His sire was a product of the King Ranch linebreeding program, as he was a son of Wimpy P-1 out of a daughter of Old Sorrel. Joe's dam was a daughter of King P-234.

== Reining and cutting career ==
Joe Cody earned an AQHA Champion and a Performance Register of Merit from the AQHA. When he earned his AQHA Championship, he was the youngest stallion to ever earn the award. He was trained and earned points in reining and cutting. He was also trained for team roping. In 1989 he was inducted into the National Reining Horse Association Hall of Fame, only the second horse so honored.

== Breeding record ==
After retiring to stud in 1961, Joe Cody was invited to Bermuda by the government of Bermuda to show both reining and cutting at the Agricultural Fair put on by the government. His owner at the time, Mrs. Virginia Harper of Long Island, New York, took him and had him perform a reining pattern and also a cutting exhibition. During his breeding career, he was the sire of Easter Cody, Sappho Cody, Paprika Cody, Sapphire Cody, High Proof, Topsail Cody, and Red God. His son Topsail Cody sired foals that earned over $1 million in NRHA earnings.

== Death and honors ==
Joe Cody died on July 1, 1989. Fuller buried him at Fuller's Willow Brook Farm in Catasauqua, Pennsylvania, with a granite headstone giving his accomplishments.

Joe Cody was inducted into the AQHA Hall of Fame in 1995.

== Pedigree ==
Old Sorrel
Solis
Mother of Solis
Wimpy P-1
Old Sorrel
Panda
mare by Hickory Bill
Bill Cody
Hickory Bill
Old Sorrel
Dr. Rose mare
Pesetita
Cardinal
Peseta
King Ranch mare
Joe Cody
Little Joe
Zantanon
Jeanette
King P-234
Strait Horse
Jabalina
mare by Traveler
Taboo
DJ by Old DJ
Billy Bowlegs
unknown
Billie Bo
unknown
Phelps mare
unknown
