= Two Eyed Jack =

Quarter Horse show horse and sire

- Breed: Quarter Horse
- Discipline: Halter; Western Pleasure
- Sire: Two D Two
- Grandsire: Double Diamond
- Dam: Triangle Tookie
- Maternal grandsire: Grey Badger III
- Sex: Stallion
- Foaled: 1961
- Country: United States
- Color: Sorrel
- Breeder: H. H. Mass
- Owner: Howard Pitzer

Other awards
- AQHA Performance ROM, AQHA Champion, AQHA Superior Halter Horse

Honors
- American Quarter Horse Hall of Fame
- Last updated on: January 12, 2008.

Two Eyed Jack was a Quarter Horse stallion and showhorse, and the leading all time sire of American Quarter Horse Association (or AQHA) Champions.

== Life ==
Two Eyed Jack was foaled in 1961, a sorrel stallion bred by H. H. Mass. His sire was Two D Two, a descendant of Old Sorrel. Two D Two's dam was a linebred Little Joe mare, Little Joe being a son of Traveler. Triangle Tookie was a daughter of Grey Badger III, and a granddaughter of Grey Badger II. Tookie's dam traced back to Joe Hancock P-455. Triangle Tookie produced five AQHA Champions in her breeding career, including Two Eyed Jack.

== Show career ==
Howard Pitzer bought Two Eyed Jack in 1964 to cross on Pitzer's Pat Star Jr mares, after the horse had already earned many of his lifetime 217 AQHA open halter points. Owned by Pitzer, he earned the rest of those halter points, as well picking up another 46.5 points in Western Pleasure, 7 points in hunt seat, 3 more points in Western Riding, 3 in working cow horse and 6 points in reining. Those points earned Two Eyed Jack an AQHA Superior Halter Horse award along with his AQHA Championship and a Performance Register of Merit.

Pitzer had previously looked at Two Eyed Jack twice before purchasing him, once when he was ten days old, and then again when Jack was two at the Denver Stock Show. The second time, Pitzer told his companions that Jack was a nice horse, and that he'd make an "awful nice gelding."

== Breeding record ==
Two Eyed Jack is the all-time leading sire of AQHA Champions, having sired 119 Champions. He also sired sixteen AQHA World Show Champions, as well as 242 Performance Register of Merit earners. He also sired three AQHA Supreme Champions. His daughter Vickie Lee Pine was the 1978 AQHA World Show Superhorse. Among his other offspring were Two Eyed Patti, Two Eyed Donna, Watch Joe Jack, Two Eyed Del, Deacon Jack, Two ID Bartender, Jack Eyed, and Two Jack.

== Death and honors ==
Two Eyed Jack stood 15.2½ hands high and weighed 1350 pounds. He died on March 2, 1991. He's buried on Pitzer's ranch in Ericson, Nebraska where Pitzer buried all his stallions.

He was inducted into the AQHA Hall of Fame in 1996. In 2007 Western Horseman magazine chose Two Eyed Jack as number four on their list of top ten ranch horse bloodlines.

== Pedigree ==
Old Sorrel
Silver King
Clegg mare #3
Double Diamond
Bailey
Scar Face S
mare by Midnight
Two D Two
Joe Moore
Pay Day
Paulita
Double Life
Little Joe
James Sunset
Chunk
Two Eyed Jack
Midnight Jr
Grey Badger II
Grey Annie
Grey Badger III
Greenock (TB)
Mary Greenock (TB)
That's Mine (TB)
Triangle Tookie
Joe Hancock P-455
Roan Hancock
Burnett ranch mare
Lady Hancock
Redolent (Morgan)
Triangle Lady 10
unknown mare
