= PSSM =

PSSM may refer to:

- Parallel-Split Shadow Map
- Position-Specific Scoring Matrix
- Pretty Soldier Sailor Moon, the official English translation of the series, often shortened as Sailor Moon
- Principles and Standards for School Mathematics, a policy book on mathematics education
- Polysaccharide storage myopathy, aka equine polysaccharide storage myopathy (PSSM or EPSM), a disease in horses
- Positive sleep state misperception, subjective hypersomnia without objective findings.
- Rhizobium leguminosarum exopolysaccharide glucosyl ketal-pyruvate-transferase, an enzyme
