= Joseph Hancock =

Joseph Hancock may refer to:

- Joseph Hancock (cricketer) (1876–1939), English first-class cricketer
- Joseph Hancock (politician) (1856–1916), Australian politician
- Joseph J. Hancock (1886–1980), judge of the United States District Court for the Canal Zone

== See also ==
- Joe Hancock (1926–1943), Quarter Horse
