= Impression =

Impression or impressions may refer to:

== Biology and medicine ==
- Colic impression, a feature of the gall bladder
- Duodenal impression, medial to the renal impression
- Gastric impression, a feature of the liver
- Dental impression, a dental procedure
- Maternal impression, the effect of maternal mental states on foetal development
- Renal impression, a feature of the gall bladder
- Suprarenal impression, a feature of the gall bladder

== Psychology ==
- First impression (psychology)
- Mental impressions (from the Sanskrit "Samskara")
- Mental dispositions or conditioned phenomena (from the Buddhist term Saṅkhāra)

=== Idiomatic expressions ===
An idiom is a phrase or a fixed expression that has a figurative, or sometimes literal, meaning.

- "To make a good first impression"
- "To be under the impression of"

== Publishing and advertising ==
- Impression (publishing), a print run of a given edition of a work
- Impression (online media), a delivered basic advertising unit from an ad distribution point
  - Cost per impression, cost accounting tool using in e-marketing
  - Viewable Impression, a metric used to report on number of distributed ads that were viewable
- Impression (software), a desktop publishing application for RISC OS systems
- Impressions, the in-flight magazine for British Mediterranean Airways
- Impressions Media, an American privately owned publisher of newspapers

== Art ==
- Impression, Sunrise, an 1872 painting by Claude Monet
- Post-Impressionism, the development of French art since Manet
- Impressions, journal of The Japanese Art Society of America

== Music ==
- The Impressions, a music group from Chicago
- Impressions (instrumental composition), a jazz standard composed by John Coltrane

=== Albums ===
- Impression (album), the soundtrack from the anime series Samurai Champloo
- Impressions (John Coltrane album), a 1963 album by jazz musician John Coltrane
- Impressions (Buck Hill album), a 1983 album by saxophonist Buck Hill
- Impressions (Chris Botti album), the 2012 album by trumpeter Chris Botti
- Impressions!, a 1959 album by Paul Horn
- Impressions (Laura Nyro album), the first compilation retrospective album by Laura Nyro
- Impressions (Lunatic Soul album), 2011
- Impressions (Mike Oldfield album), a 1980 compilation album by Mike Oldfield released
- Impressions (Mal Waldron album), a 1959 album by Mal Waldron
- The Impressions (album), a 1963 album

== Other uses ==
- Impressions, a form of mimicry practised by an impressionist (entertainment)
- Impressions (Angel novel), a 2003 novel derivative of the television series Angel
- "Impressions" (Wildfire), a 2005 television episode
- Impressions Games, a video game developer

== See also ==
- Impress (disambiguation)
- False Impression, a 2006 novel by Jeffrey Archer
- "First Impressions" (Angel), a 2000 episode of the television series Angel
- The Big Impression, a British comedy sketch show
- Impressions de France, a 1982 film about France
- Impressment, a type of forced military service
- Imprint (disambiguation)
