= Impressive (horse) =

Quarter Horse showhorse and sire

- Breed: Quarter Horse
- Discipline: Halter
- Sire: Lucky Bar
- Grandsire: Three Bars (TB)
- Dam: Glamour Bars
- Maternal grandsire: Lightning Bar
- Sex: Stallion
- Foaled: April 15, 1969
- Died: March 20, 1995
- Country: United States
- Color: Sorrel
- Breeder: Perry Cotton
- Owner: Dean Landers; Fennel Brown

Other awards
- 1974 AQHA World Champion Open Aged Halter stallion

Honors
- 2022 American Quarter Horse Hall of Fame

Impressive (April 15, 1969 – March 20, 1995) was an Appendix Quarter Horse, who earned his full AQHA registration in 1971. He was the 1974 World Champion Open Aged halter stallion, the first such World Champion in his breed, despite carrying only 48 halter points in total. He sired 2,251 foals, of which thirty went on to be World Champions themselves. The horse was inducted into the American Quarter Horse Hall of Fame in 2022.

== Showing and breeding ==
In his showing days, Impressive changed hands a number of times. One of his owners was Dean Landers, who also owned the halter stallions Two Eyed Jack, Coy's Bonanza, and Sonny Dee Bar. Although Impressive was sent to race training, he never raced. He was sent home and the next year he was excluded from any performance discipline due to pedal osteitis, leaving halter as his only choice. His groundbreaking 1974 World Championship soon cemented his role in that discipline. Each time Impressive was resold, his price rose quickly; at one point, an offer of $300,000 for him was refused by Brown, who said "ain't nobody in this world got enough money to buy this horse."

Impressive was highly sought after for breeding, despite at one time carrying a stud fee of $25,000. He sired a total of 2,251 foals, and as of 2003, was estimated to have in excess of 55,000 living descendants. He was bred for his muscular and refined form, which was passed on to his offspring often enough to make him at least the #5 all-time leading Quarter Horse sire when ranked by AQHA points earned by all progeny combined.

== Hyperkalemic periodic paralysis ==
HYPP was first recognized in the 1980s, but it became evident that many horses descended from Impressive were afflicted with the genetic disease hyperkalemic periodic paralysis (HYPP), and in 1992 Impressive was publicly linked to HYPP and considered the index case. As of 2009 there were 355,000 registered descendants of Impressive with approximately 4% affected with HYPP.

HYPP is a dominant gene, and as such, all animals with even one copy of the gene, identified as "N/H", will exhibit some symptoms of the disease. Horses with two copies, identified as "H/H." will always pass on the condition, and research suggests that H/H horses may have more severe symptoms than N/H horses.

After a number of years of debate, effective since January 1, 2007, the AQHA amended rule 205(c)(3) and rule Rule 227(e) to require all descendants of Impressive to be tested prior to being registered, and ban from registration all horses born after January 1, 2007 with HYPP genetics confirmed by DNA testing to be homozygous for the condition (H/H). Other breed registries that accept animals with Quarter Horse bloodlines, including the American Paint Horse Association and the Appaloosa Horse Club, have instituted testing requirements but have yet to bar animals with the condition. There is currently a widespread effort among many breeders to eliminate the disease by selective breeding, but there are those who continue to breed without regard for it, or even deliberately seeking the muscular enhancement correlated with it, and in doing so perpetuate the disease's existence.

== Sire line tree ==
- Impressive
  - The Graduate
  - Mr Impressive
  - Conclusive
    - Mr Conclusion
  - Impressive Dandy
  - Zip To Impress
  - Tardy Impressive
  - Noble Tradition
    - Noble TKO
      - Extradition
      - Notable
      - The Great Gatsby
      - Traditional Step
      - Just Noble
      - To The Manor Born

== Pedigree ==
Pedigree of Impressive
Sire Lucky Bar (TB)	Three Bars (TB)*	Percentage (TB)*	Midway*
Sire Lucky Bar (TB)	Three Bars (TB)*	Percentage (TB)*	Gossip Avenue*
Sire Lucky Bar (TB)	Three Bars (TB)*	Myrtle Dee (TB)*	Luke McLuke*
Sire Lucky Bar (TB)	Three Bars (TB)*	Myrtle Dee (TB)*	Civil Maid*
Sire Lucky Bar (TB)	Fulfilment (TB)	Karimkhan	Dastur
Sire Lucky Bar (TB)	Fulfilment (TB)	Karimkhan	Teresina
Sire Lucky Bar (TB)	Fulfilment (TB)	Flying Bimy	Bimelech
Sire Lucky Bar (TB)	Fulfilment (TB)	Flying Bimy	Thirty Knots
Dam Glamour Bars	Lightning Bar	Three Bars (TB)*	Percentage (TB)*
Dam Glamour Bars	Lightning Bar	Three Bars (TB)*	Myrtle Dee (TB)*
Dam Glamour Bars	Lightning Bar	Della P	Doc Horn (TB)
Dam Glamour Bars	Lightning Bar	Della P	mare by Old DJ
Dam Glamour Bars	Tonkawa Bar	Sugar Bars	Three Bars (TB)*
Dam Glamour Bars	Tonkawa Bar	Sugar Bars	Frontera Sugar
Dam Glamour Bars	Tonkawa Bar	Bucket Baby	Leo
Dam Glamour Bars	Tonkawa Bar	Bucket Baby	Black Dahlia Bucket

* Impressive is inbred 2S x 3D x 4D to the stallion Three Bars, meaning that he appears second generation on the sire side of his pedigree, and third generation and fourth generation on the dam side of his pedigree.
