= Myosin-heavy chain myopathy =

Genetic horse disease

Myosin-heavy chain myopathy (MYHM) is a genetic muscle disease found primarily in the American Quarter Horse and crossbred horses with significant Quarter Horse bloodlines.

It was added to the AQHA genetic testing panel in 2022. It is a genetic dominant condition, though not all horses who inherit the gene will show clinical signs of being affected and the environmental triggers are not well understood at present. An estimated 7% of all Quarter Horses carry this gene. There are two forms, both linked to the same genetic variant. Affected horses may exhibit one or both forms. The first is Immune-Mediated Myositis (IMM). It may occur in response to a vaccine or infectious agent, where the immune system misinterprets the muscle cells as foreign and rapidly attacks them. Horses initially experience stiffness, weakness, and a decreased appetite followed by the rapid loss of 40% of muscle mass within 72 hours. The second presentation of MYHM is Nonexertional Rhabdomyolysis (compare to PSSM, below) and often presents as stiffness and possible swelling of muscles along the back and haunches without exercise. Clinical signs include pain, muscle cramping, and muscle damage, but may or may not result in muscle loss. When triggered, horses can recover but may have more frequent episodes. Horses that are homozygous (My/My) may have more severe symptoms.
