= Hot walker =

Stable worker who hand walks hot horses

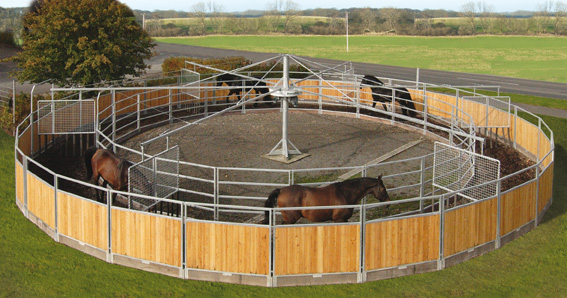
Horses inside a European style automated hot walker, not tied to the mechanism

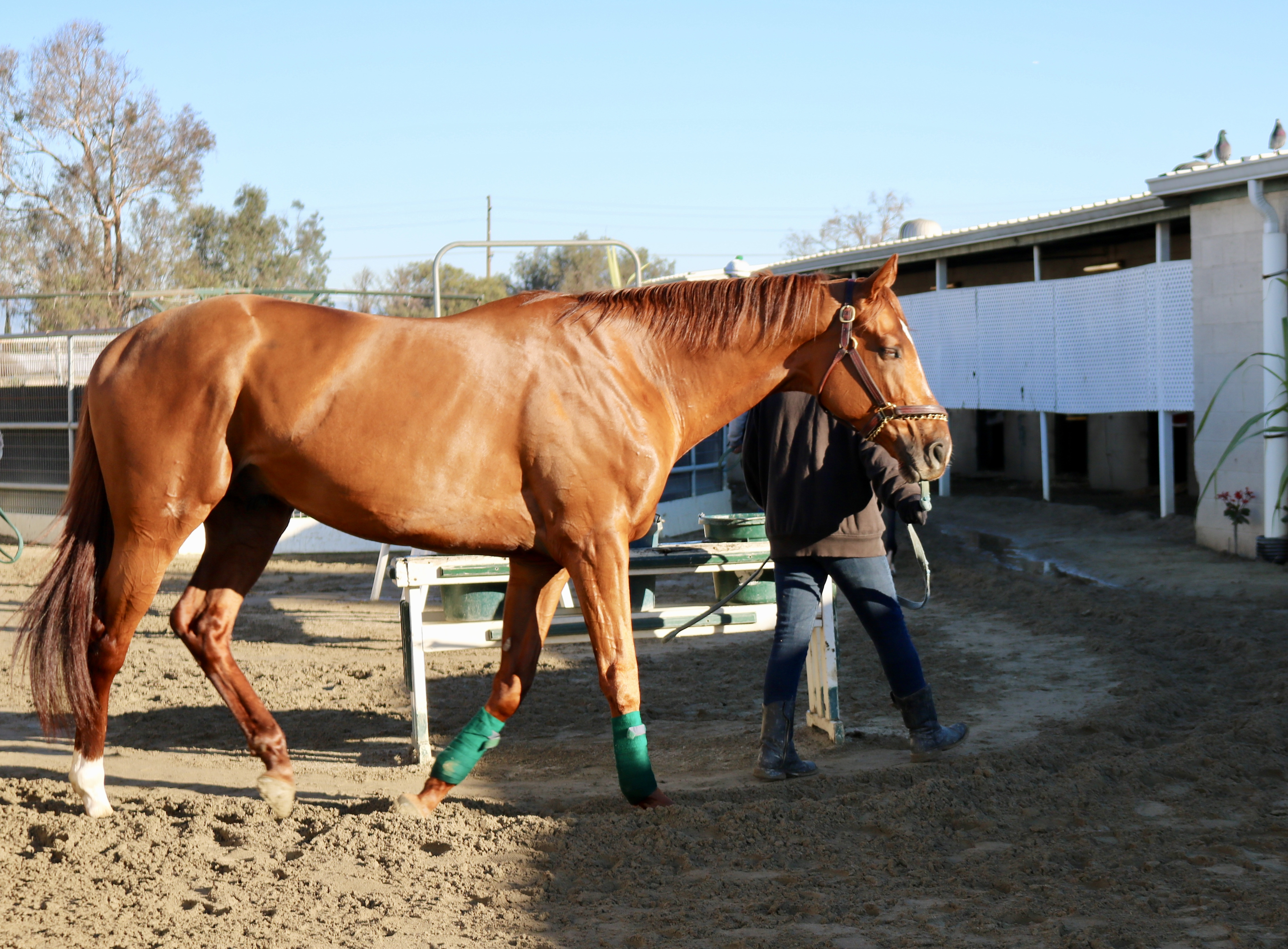
A hot walker or groom hand-walking a racehorse

A hot walker within the practice of horse management is a person such as a groom or stable worker who hand walks hot, sweaty horses after a workout, particularly after work on a racetrack. The term hot walker may also refer to a mechanical device designed for the same purpose.

Hot walking allows the horse to cool down after hard exercise, which helps the horse's pulse and respiration return to normal, reduces stiffness, and minimizes the risk of health issues such as influenza, colic or equine exertional rhabdomyolysis.

For humans, the work is generally considered entry-level in the horse industry and pay is generally close to the minimum wage. Mechanical hot walkers cost several thousand dollars, and prices varying widely depending on size and construction.

== Routine ==
Management techniques vary widely, but typically following a workout, a horse is hosed or sponged off to remove sweat and sometimes liniment is applied. While hot-walking, the handler may periodically stop and offer the horse water to drink. A horse may need to be walked for a half hour or more.

== Mechanical hot walkers ==
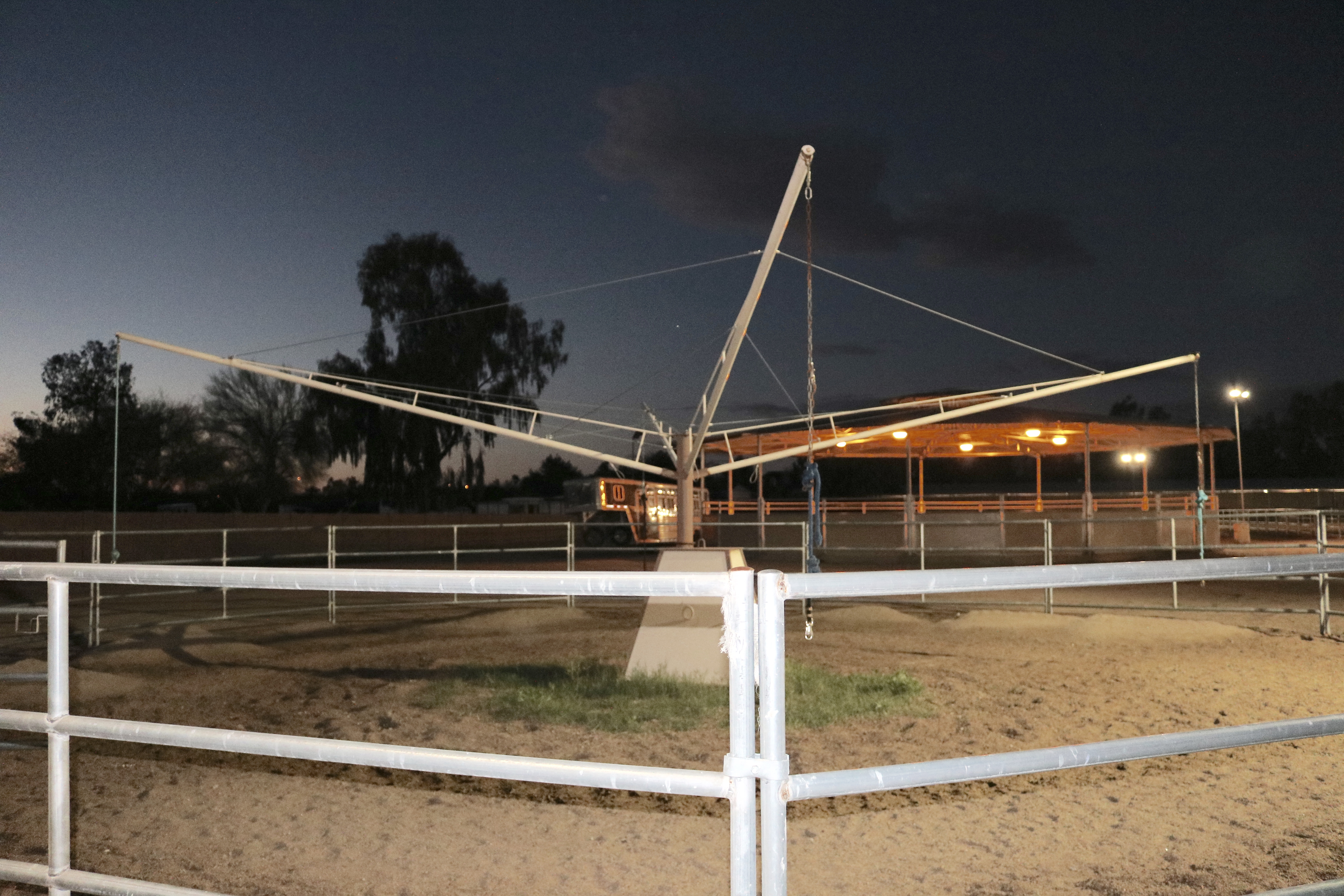
A US style mechanized hot walker for four horses, each rope hanging down is attached to a horse's halter.

Mechanical hot walkers come in many designs. The horses on the walker go in a circle, and most hot walkers can be set to go in either direction. The most common design in the United States consists of four arms of heavy gauge steel radiating off from a central pivot point containing a motor to move the arms at various speeds, most often set to have horses walk. At the end of each arm is a short rope with a snap at the end, which attaches to the halter of the horse. Newer designs originating in Europe have moving panels and no radial arms. The motor is often on a timer that will stop after a set amount of time.

Basic safety on a mechanical hot walker includes having the horses under the supervision of a human at all times, not allowing people to ride a horse while on a hot walker, and if two instead of four horses are on the walker, to place them on opposite sides.

== Human hot walkers ==
Humans employed as hot walkers usually handle the horse on a lead rope and walk alongside the animal after a workout until the animal has cooled down from exercise and their coat has dried. Formal education is not required, and most learn from on the job training. Basic knowledge of equine behavior and some horsemanship skills can be useful.

Racetracks, some farms, and training centers usually hire hot walkers. Hot walking horses is an entry-level job, but as time goes on hot walkers can move into positions such as a groom, exercise rider or obtain a management role. Minimum wage is usually paid to most hot walkers, but at the track, employees can receive bonuses if a horse under their care wins a race. In 2009, hot walkers earned $19,360 a year. The lowest-paid ten percent of hot walkers earned less than $15,000 a year, and the highest-paid 10% earned over $31,000 a year.

Hot walkers working at the track usually work morning training hours but those working at training facilities can work afternoon hours. Hot walkers start leading horses to and from the track from 5:30 am until 10:30 am or cooling horses out at that time. The job may can be expose workers to extreme climate conditions and some may work 6 days a week. Hot walkers that work at a racetrack must have an occupational license for the state they are working in. The licensing process usually requires people to pay a fee, submit fingerprints, and submit a photo for an identification badge. For hot walkers at a racetrack to be eligible for a license they must be employed by a trainer.

Those hot walkers looking to become racetrack grooms sometimes can take courses offered at the track. Those who do so may obtain certification.
