= Hyperkalemic periodic paralysis (equine) =

Genetic disorder in Quarter Horses, Appaloosas, and Paint Horses

Hyperkalemic periodic paralysis (HYPP, HyperKPP) is a genetic disorder that occurs in horses. It is also known as Impressive syndrome, after an index case in a horse named Impressive. It is an inherited autosomal dominant disorder that affects sodium channels in muscle cells and the ability to regulate potassium levels in the blood. It is characterized by muscle hyperexcitability or weakness which, exacerbated by potassium, heat or cold, can lead to uncontrolled shaking followed by paralysis.

The mutation which causes this disorder is dominant on SCN4A with linkage to the sodium channel expressed in muscle. The mutation causes single amino acid changes in parts of the channel which are important for inactivation. In the presence of high potassium levels, including those induced by diet, sodium channels fail to inactivate properly.

Equine hyperkalemic periodic paralysis occurs in 1 in 50 Quarter Horses and can be traced to a single ancestor, a stallion named Impressive.

== Symptoms and presentation ==
This inherited disease is characterized by violent muscle twitching and substantial muscle weakness or paralysis among affected horses. HYPP is a dominant genetic disorder; therefore, heterozygotes bred to genotypically normal horses have a statistic probability of producing clinically affected offspring 50% of the time.

Horses with HYPP can be treated with some possibility of reducing clinical signs, but the degree that medical treatment helps varies from horse to horse. There is no cure. Horses with HYPP often lose muscle control during an attack.

Some horses are more affected by the disease than others and some attacks will be more severe than others, even in the same horse. Symptoms of an HYPP attack may include:

- Muscle trembling
- Prolapse of the third eyelid — this means that the third eyelid flickers across the eye or covers more of the eye than normal
- Generalized weakness
- Weakness in the hind end — the horse may look as though it is 'dog-sitting'
- Complete collapse
- Abnormal whinny — because the muscles of the voicebox are affected as well as other muscles
- Death — in a severe attack the diaphragm is paralyzed and the horse can suffocate

HYPP attacks occur randomly and can strike a horse standing calmly in a stable just as easily as during exercise. Following an HYPP attack, the horse appears normal and is not in any pain which helps to distinguish it from Equine Exertional Rhabdomyolysis (ER), commonly known as "Azoturia," "Monday Morning Sickness" or "tying up." Horses that are tying up usually suffer attacks in connection with exercise and may take anywhere from 12 hours to several days to recover. Muscle tissue is damaged in an attack of ER, and the horse will be in pain during and following an attack. A blood test will reveal elevations in certain muscle enzymes after an episode of ER and so the two diseases, while superficially similar, are easily distinguished from one another in the laboratory.

Unlike with seizures, horses with HYPP are fully conscious and lucid during an attack. Horses may suffocate during an HYPP attack due to paralysis of the respiratory system. Horses that collapse during an episode are clearly distressed as they repeatedly struggle to get to their feet. If this occurs while the horse is being ridden or otherwise handled, the human handler or rider may be at risk of being injured by the movement of the horse.

== Genetics ==
In 1994, researchers at the University of Pittsburgh, with a grant from horse organizations, isolated the genetic mutation responsible for the problem and developed a blood test for it. Using this test, horses may be identified as:

- H/H, meaning they have the mutation and it is homozygous. These horses always pass on the disease.
- N/H, meaning they have the mutation and it is heterozygous. These horses are affected to a lesser degree and pass on the disease 50% of the time.
- N/N, meaning they do not have the mutation and cannot pass it on, even if they are descendants of Impressive.

In the case of the horse Impressive, the muscles were always contracting, leading to a developed musculature.

== Inheritance and prevalence ==
The disease is linked to the bloodline of the famous American Quarter Horse stallion Impressive, who has over 55,000 living descendants as of 2003. Although the disease is primarily limited to the American Quarter Horse and closely related breeds such as American Paint Horses and Appaloosas at this time, cross-breeding has begun to extend it to crossbreds recognized by other breed registries as well as grade horses. Until the AQHA restricted the registration of animals with the condition, the spread of the disease was perpetuated by the favorable placings given to affected horses in halter competition at horse shows, because a secondary characteristic associated with N/H and H/H horses is heavy, bulky muscling that is favored by stock horse judges, a trend that began with Impressive and predates the modern understanding of the disease. Some stock horse breeds with Quarter Horse bloodlines have yet to restrict registration in order to limit the perpetuation of HYPP.

== Regulation ==
Some horse organizations have instituted rules to attempt to eliminate this widespread disease. The American Quarter Horse Association (AQHA) mandates testing for foals descended from Impressive if both of the foal's parents were not homozygous negative (N/N) for the gene, and, since 2007, has not registered foals homozygous (H/H) for the gene. Since 2007, the Appaloosa Horse Club (ApHC) has required foals descended from Impressive to be tested, so that the results may be recorded on its certificate. The American Paint Horse Association (APHA) mandated that, after 2017, stallions must be tested for HYPP so that mare owners may make an informed decision before choosing a stallion for breeding to their mare.

== See also ==
- Equine polysaccharide storage myopathy (EPSM)
- HERDA
