= Wimpy P-1 =

Quarter Horse show horse and sire

Wimpy
- Breed: Quarter Horse
- Sire: Solis
- Grandsire: Old Sorrel
- Dam: Panda
- Maternal grandsire: Old Sorrel
- Sex: Stallion
- Foaled: 1937
- Country: United States
- Color: Chestnut
- Breeder: King Ranch
- Owner: King Ranch, George Clegg, Rex Cauble

Other awards
- AQHA registration number 1.

Honors
- American Quarter Horse Hall of Fame
- Last updated on: January 12, 2008.

Wimpy P-1 was the first registered Quarter Horse for the American Quarter Horse Association, or AQHA.

== Life ==
Wimpy was foaled on the King Ranch in Kingsville, Texas on March 3, 1937. However, the original application listed his foaling date as April 3, 1937, and the original stud books gave his foaling year as 1935. He was a son of Solis, himself a son of Old Sorrel, the King Ranch foundation stallion. Solis' dam was an unregistered and unnamed mare of Thoroughbred breeding who was by Right Royal and out of a mare by Martin's Best. Wimpy's dam was a mare named Panda, also sired by Old Sorrel. Panda's dam was a roan mare by Hickory Bill. Wimpy traced three times to Hickory Bill, making him quite inbred to Hickory Bill.

Wimpy was a chestnut colored stallion, with a star and a sock on his left hind leg. When fully grown, he was 15 hands high and weighed about 1200 pounds.

== Show career ==
Wimpy was a grand Champion Stallion in March 1941 at the Southwestern Exposition Quarter Horse show in Fort Worth, Texas, which honor earned him the first number in the newly organized American Quarter Horse Association.

== Breeding record ==
Wimpy sired over a hundred and fifty foals for the King Ranch, before he was given in 1958 to George Clegg, who had bred Old Sorrel. However, Clegg was forced to sell Wimpy to Rex Cauble, who owned the stallion until Wimpy died on August 13, 1959, when Wimpy was twenty-two years old.

Among Wimpy's sons and daughters were Bill Cody, Kip Mac, Caballero, Wimpy's Image, Silver Wimpy, Wimpy II, Lauro and Showdown. His grandget included Joe Cody, Marion's Girl, Codalena, Pandarita Hill and Show Maid.

== Honors ==
Wimpy was inducted into the AQHA Hall of Fame in 1989. In September 1961 a bronze statue of Wimpy was erected outside the AQHA Headquarters in Amarillo, Texas.

== Pedigree ==
Peter McCue
Hickory Bill
Lucreita M (TB)
Old Sorrel
unknown
Dr Rose Mare
unknown
Solis
Rapallo (TB)
Right Royal (TB)
Mrs Delaney (TB)
Mother of Solis
Martin's Best (TB)
Lazarus mare by Martin's Best (TB)
unknown mare
Wimpy P-1
Peter McCue
Hickory Bill
Lucretia M (TB)
Old Sorrel
unknown
Dr Rose mare
unknown
Panda
Peter McCue
Hickory Bill
Lucretia M (TB)
roan mare by Hickory Bill
unknown mare
