= Impress =

Impress or Impression may refer to:

== Arts ==
- Big Impression, a British comedy sketch show
- Impression, Sunrise, a painting by Claude Monet

== Biology ==
- Maternal impression, an obsolete scientific theory that explained the existence of birth defects and congenital disorders
- IMPReSS, a database of standardized phenotyping protocols used by the International Mouse Phenotyping Consortium

== Computing ==
- Impress, a presentation program included in StarOffice, there are several current descendant office suites
  - Apache OpenOffice Impress
  - Collabora Online Impress
  - LibreOffice Impress

== Legal ==
- Case of first impression, a case or controversy over an interpretation of law never before reported or decided by that court.
- Present sense impression, in the law of evidence, is a statement made by a person that conveys their sense of the state of certain things at the time the person was perceiving the event, or immediately thereafter.

== Organization ==
- Impress Group, Bangladeshi company
- Impress Corporation, Japanese media company
  - Impress Watch, Japanese news website

== Printing ==
- Impression, a synonym for a print run in the publishing industry.
- Impression seal, a type of accent seal.

== Other uses ==
- Impress (regulator), Independent Monitor for the Press, a press regulator in the United Kingdom
- Cost Per Impression, a term used in online marketing for measuring the worth and cost of a specific e-marketing campaign.
- Impressment, the act of conscripting people to serve in the military or navy.

== See also ==
- First impression (disambiguation)
