= Equine polysaccharide storage myopathy =

Genetic disorder in Quarter Horses and draft horses

Equine polysaccharide storage myopathy (EPSM, PSSM, EPSSM) is a hereditary glycogen storage disease of horses that causes exertional rhabdomyolysis. It is currently known to affect the following breeds: American Quarter Horses, American Paint Horses, Warmbloods, Cobs, Dales Ponies, Thoroughbreds, Arabians, New Forest ponies, and a large number of heavy horse breeds. While incurable, PSSM can be managed with appropriate diet and exercise. There are currently 2 subtypes, known as Type 1 PSSM and Type 2 PSSM.

== Pathophysiology of glycogen storage disorders and sub-typing of PSSM ==
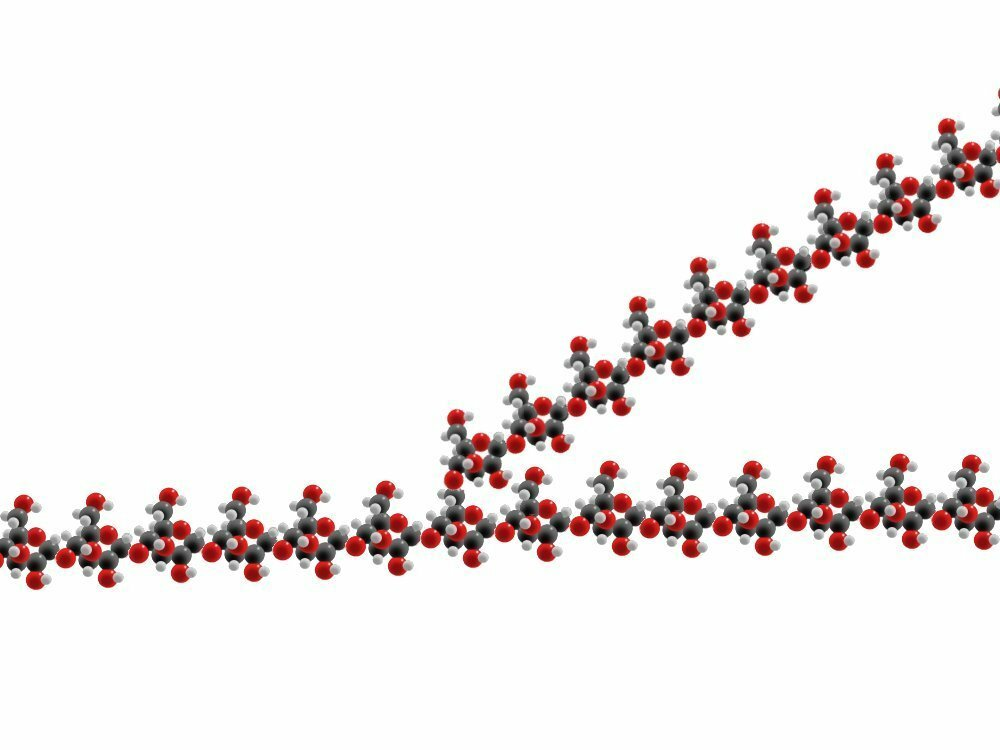
A representation of glucose molecules linked by α-1,4-glycosidic bonds, with a single α-1,6-glycosidic bond leading to a branch off of the chain

Glycogen is a molecular polymer of glucose (a polysaccharide) used to store energy, and is important for maintaining glucose homeostasis in the blood, as well as for providing energy for skeletal muscle and cardiac muscle contraction. Molecules of glucose are linked into linear chains by α-1,4-glycosidic bonds. Additionally, branches of glucose are formed off of the chain by α-1,6-glycosidic bonds. 2 molecules of glucose are joined into an α-1,4-glycosidic bonds by an enzyme known as glycogen synthase. This bond may be broken by glycogen phosphorylase when the body wishes to break down glycogen into glucose for energy. Glycogen branching enzyme is responsible for the required α-1,6-glycosidic bonds needed to start a branch off of these linear chains.

Any disruption to this system results in a glycogen storage disease. There are currently 2 subcategories of glycogen storage diseases in horses: Type 1 polysaccharide storage myopathy, glycogen branching enzyme deficiency, and Type 2 polysaccharide storage myopathy.

=== Type 1 PSSM ===
Type 1 PSSM is caused by an autosomal dominant genetic mutation known as GSY1. This mutation causes an up-regulation of glycogen synthase, and high levels of glycogen synthase relative to glycogen branching enzyme (GBE). This altered ratio of glycogen synthase to GBE results in glycogen molecules with long chains and few branches, making these molecules somewhat resistant to amylase breakdown on amylase-PAS (periodic acid-Schiff) stained biopsies. The GSY1 mutation is associated with altered glucose metabolism (but normal glycogen metabolism), as well as accumulation of high levels of glycogen and abnormal polysaccharide in the muscles of the horse. Additionally, some horses have been shown to have insulin sensitivity, which improves glucose uptake by muscle cells and contributes to excessive glycogen storage that is already elevated secondary to the GSY1 mutation.

=== Glycogen branching enzyme deficiency ===
Low levels of glycogen branching enzyme leads to a condition known as glycogen-branching enzyme deficiency. This condition is caused by a mutation of the GBE1 gene responsible for producing the glycogen branching enzyme. Subsequently, glycogen molecules are produced with few branches, which greatly decreases the number of nonreducing ends, drastically slowing the rate at which the molecule can be synthesized or broken down. This causes low levels of muscle glycogen that is very resistant to amylase. This disease is usually seen in Quarter Horse foals and is fatal.

=== Type 2 PSSM ===
Type 2 PSSM is a category for disorders that lead to abnormal deposition of glycogen in the skeletal muscles of the horse that is not due to mutations in GSY1 or GBE1.

== Presentation ==
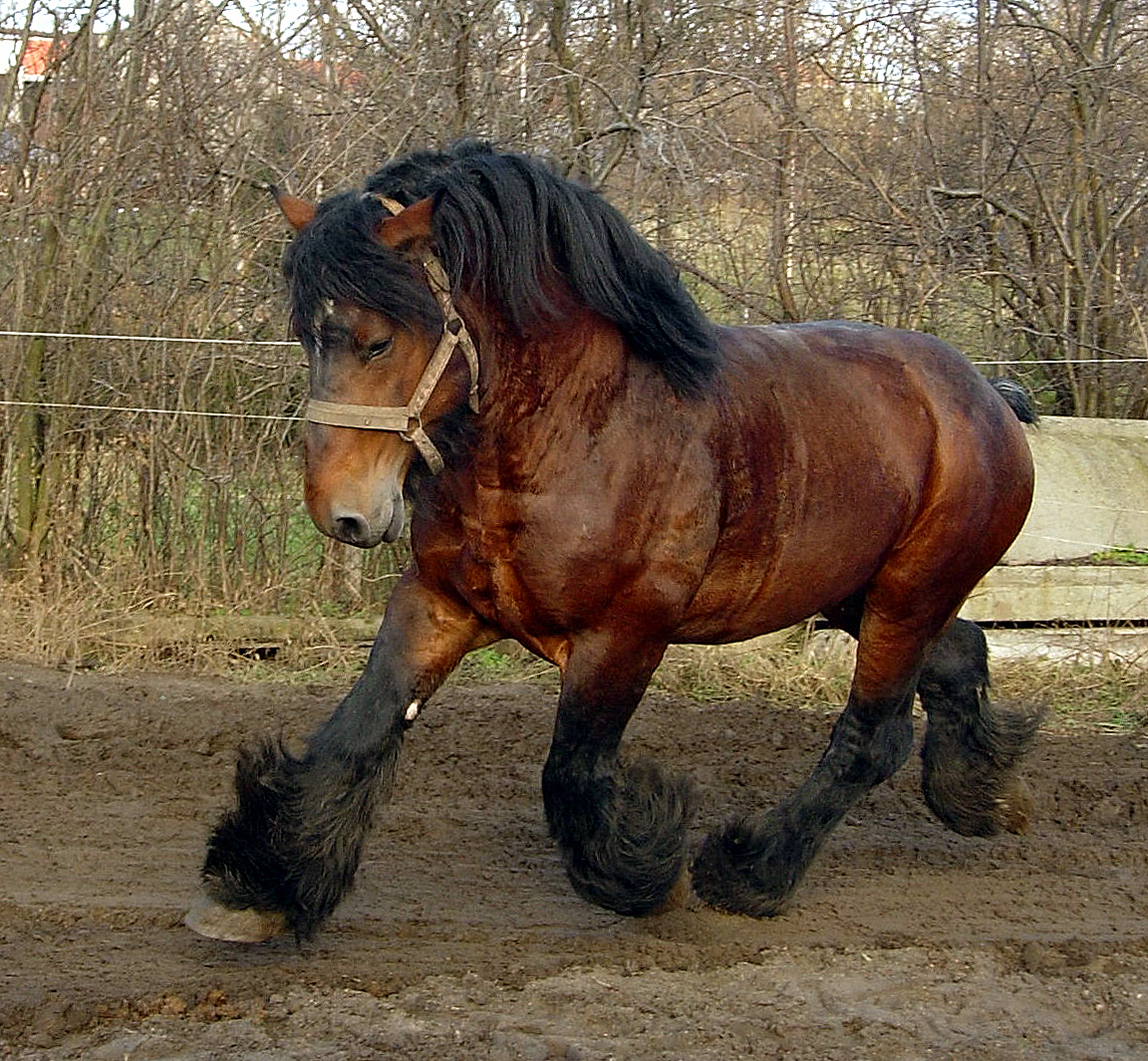
The Belgian Draft is one breed with a very high prevalence of PSSM in their population.

PSSM is most prevalent in American Quarter Horses and their related breeds (Paint horse, Appaloosa, Appendix Quarter Horse), Draft horse breeds (especially Belgian Draft and Percherons), and Warmblood breeds. The Belgian Draft been shown to have a 36% prevalence of PSSM. Other breeds that have been diagnosed with PSSM include the Arabian, Lipizzaner, Morgan, Mustang, Peruvian Paso, Rocky Mountain Horse, Standardbred, Tennessee Walking Horse, Thoroughbred, and National Show Horse. It has been suggested that the GSY1 mutation provided some benefit to hard working animals with poor-quality diets, and is now damaging members of those "thrifty" breeds that are managed with moderate to low levels of work and diets high in non-structural carbohydrates.

PSSM Type 1 (homozygous or heterozygous for the GSY1 mutation) is more common in Quarter Horses and their related breeds, and draft breeds, while PSSM Type 2 (negative for the GSY1 mutation) is more commonly seen in other breeds, including warmbloods. There is no sex predilection to the disease.

== Clinical signs ==
Horses with Type 1 PSSM usually appear normal at rest, but show signs of exertional rhabdomyolysis ("tying up") such as shortened stride, stiffness, firm musculature, sweating, pain or reluctance to exercise, when asked to perform light work. While episodes of exertional rhabdomyolysis is one of the most frequent signs associated with affected horses (reported in ~37% of affected animals), other common signs include gait abnormalities, shifting lameness, muscle weakness that may result in an inability to rise, colic-like pain, and muscle fasciculation, atrophy, and/or stiffness (most commonly seen in the semimembranosus, semitendinosus, and longissimus muscles).

These clinical signs usually first become apparent when the horse is placed into training as a young animal; however, affected horses will show histological changes consistent with muscle damage at one month of age, and may also show elevations in creatine kinase (CK), an enzyme that elevates with muscle damage. Concurrent illness, such as respiratory or gastrointestinal infection, can lead to elevations in CK and potentially life-threatening rhabdomyolysis, even without exercise. Horses with PSSM often have a persistently elevated CK at rest, which differentiates the disease from recurrent exertional rhabdomyolysis, in which horses have normal CK concentrations between episodes.

=== Variability in phenotype and modifying genes ===
Some affected animals may remain subclinical, others may have mild signs that do not impede athletic performance, while some horses will have clinical signs that prevent any forced exercise. Rarely, horses will die from acute episodes of rhabdomyolysis. The reason for such variability of phenotype is not fully understood. Temperament, sex, and body type have no effect on degree of clinical signs. However, environmental factors such as diet and exercise, whether the horse is heterozygous or homozygous for the mutated GSY1 allele, and the presence of modifying genes all play a role. Additionally, some affected horses may have PSSM Type 2, which will produce different cellular changes and subsequently different phenotypic effects.

One such modifying genes is RYR1, which is responsible for calcium regulation in muscle cells. RYR1 mutation causes malignant hyperthermia, a rare but potentially fatal disorder usually associated with anesthesia. While RYR1 mutation is rare in horses, including the general Quarter Horse population, it is much more common in Quarter Horses with GSY1 mutation. Horses with both mutations are more likely to have a severe PSSM phenotype, including higher levels of blood creatine kinase (CK), more severe exercise intolerance, more severe episodes of rhabdomyolysis (more frequent muscle fasciculations, more frequent episodes that are not associated with exercise, acute death), and poor response to PSSM treatment.

Additionally, defects in both GSY1 and the SCNA4 gene, responsible for hyperkalemic periodic paralysis (HYPP) in Quarter Horses and related breeds, has been found in 14% of Halter horses. A combination of both of these genes can cause severe rhabdomyolysis should the horse become recumbent due to an HYPP attack.

== Diagnosis ==
A genetic test is available for Type 1 PSSM. This test requires a blood or hair sample, and is less-invasive than muscle biopsy. However, it may be less useful for breeds that are more commonly affected by Type 2 PSSM, such as light horse breeds. Often a muscle biopsy is recommended for horses displaying clinical signs of PSSM but who have negative results for GSY1 mutation.

A muscle biopsy may be taken from the semimembranosis or semitendinosis (hamstring) muscles. The biopsy is stained for glycogen, and the intensity of stain uptake in the muscle, as well as the presence of any inclusions, helps to determine the diagnosis of PSSM. This test is the only method for diagnosing Type 2 PSSM. Horses with Type 1 PSSM will usually have between 1.5 and 2 times the normal levels of glycogen in their skeletal muscle. While abnormalities indicating muscle damage can be seen on histologic sections of muscle as young as 1 month of age, abnormal polysaccharide accumulation may take up to 3 years to develop.

== Management ==
=== Effect on metabolism ===
Horses with PSSM have elevated levels of muscle glycogen at rest. During exercise, glycogen levels are depleted faster than is seen in unaffected horses, and are reduced down to levels considered normal for a resting non-PSSM horse. This demonstrates that glycogen metabolism is actually normal in these animals. However, PSSM horses synthesize muscle glycogen at double the rate of a normal horse once exercise has ceased, which leads to elevated muscle glycogen. The exact mechanism of abnormal glucose metabolism has not yet been established, but it may have similarities to phosphofructokinase deficiency in humans.

Quarter Horse-related breeds with PSSM show insulin sensitivity, which improves glucose uptake by cells, and these horses clear the blood of glucose more quickly after eating than unaffected horses. This provides easy access to glucose by the muscles, which can then use the substrate to produce glycogen. The GSY1 defect, which up-regulates the glycogen synthase enzyme, allows the muscles to use this glucose to rapidly produce glycogen for storage in the muscle. Surprisingly, increased insulin sensitivity is not seen in draft horse breeds.

Dietary and exercise manipulation may be used to counteract these metabolic changes. Approximately 50% of horses that adhere to the dietary recommendations, and 90% of horses that adhere to both dietary and exercise recommendations, have few to no episodes of exertional rhabdomyolysis.

=== Diet ===
For most horses, diet has a significant impact on the degree of clinical signs. PSSM horses fed diets high in nonstructural carbohydrates (NSC), which stimulate insulin secretion, have been shown to have increased severity of rhabdomyolysis with exercise. Current recommendations for horses with PSSM include a low-starch, high-fat diet. Low-starch diets produce low blood glucose and insulin levels after eating, which may reduce the amount of glucose taken up by the muscle cells. High fat diets increase free fatty acid concentrations in the blood, which may promote the use of fat for energy (via free fatty acid oxidation) over glucose metabolism. Horses with the most severe clinical signs often show the greatest improvement on the diet.

Dietary recommendations usually include a combination of calorie restriction, reduction of daily NSC content, and an increase in dietary fat. Diet recommendations need to be balanced with the animal's body condition score and exercise level, as it may be beneficial to wait on increasing dietary fat after an obese animal has lost weight. The diet should have <10% of digestible energy coming from NSC, and 15–20% of daily digestible energy coming from fat.

=== Exercise ===
Horses with PSSM show fewer clinical signs if their exercise is slowly increased over time (i.e. they are slowly conditioned). Additionally, they are much more likely to develop muscle stiffness and rhabdomyolysis if they are exercised after prolonged stall rest.

Horses generally have fewer clinical signs when asked to perform short bouts of work at maximal activity level (anaerobic exercise), although they have difficulty achieving maximal speed and tire faster than unaffected horses. They have more muscle damage when asked to perform lower intensity activity over a longer period of time (aerobic activity), due to an energy deficit in the muscle.
