= False Impression =

Novel by Jeffrey Archer

- First edition (UK)
- Author: Jeffrey Archer
- Language: English
- Publisher: Macmillan (UK); St. Martin's Press (US)
- Publication place: United Kingdom
- Media type: Print (hardcover)
- Pages: 385
- ISBN: 1-4050-3255-3

False Impression is a mystery novel by English author Jeffrey Archer, first published in February 2005 by Macmillan (ISBN 1405032553). The novel was published in several countries.

== Plot summary ==
False Impression concerns an international journey through several countries and continents, including London, New York, Bucharest and Tokyo, and includes historical information about the September 11 attacks on New York, which the protagonist, Anna Petrescu, escapes after being fired by the dishonest banker Bryce Fenston. From this point on, the book tells the story of Anna trying to help Arabella Wentworth, a British aristocrat, to recover her family's fortune by selling a historical painting by Vincent van Gogh, which Bryce Fenston is intent on acquiring. She is followed closely by Olga Krantz, a mercenary on service to Fenston, and by Jack Delaney, an FBI agent who is investigating Fenston and trying to discover if Anna is still working for Fenston. Anna succeeds in throwing both off her trail and makes arrangements to sell the painting to a Japanese steel magnate named Nakamura. In the end Krantz is shot, for the second time in a few days, and later captured and sent to the Belmarsh prison. The painting is successfully sold to the steel magnate, Anna accepts a job as CEO of his foundation, Jack Delaney gathers enough proof to arrest Fenston, and Anna and Jack begin a romantic relationship.
