= Impressive (software) =

- Other names: KeyJNote
- Original author: Martin J. Fiedler
- Initial release: 5 September 2005; 20 years ago
- Stable release: 0.12.1 / 28 August 2019; 6 years ago
- Preview release: 0.13.0-beta2 / 31 May 2020; 5 years ago
- Repository: svn.emphy.de/impressive/trunk/impressive/
- Written in: Python
- Operating system: Microsoft Windows, Linux, FreeBSD, MacOS, PC-BSD
- Platform: cross-platform
- Type: Presentation program
- License: GPLv2
- Website: impressive.sourceforge.net

Impressive is a free and open-source software that displays presentation slides with 3D-effects. It is a lightweight and easy to use console presentation software with focus on PDF documents and images. It was started by Martin Fiedler in 2005.

== Features ==
Impressive is a simple presentation program that displays slide show PDF documents, LaTeX slides or digital images in the JPEG, PNG, TIFF and BMP file formats, adding 3D effects. Presentation slides can be created in an external software application of choice and Impressive used for displaying them. Impressive features a timer, multi-monitor setups and fully customizable keyboard and mouse controls, with an optimal keyboard, computer mouse and digital pen input handling. Impressive can be used to present JPG based photographic albums and in generall full sets of documentation in open source or copy-left formats with older or low power computer hardware and from the console.

Basic features of the software are smooth alpha-blended slide transitions and an overview function. The overview screen, available anytime by clicking a key, reveals a thumbnail grid of all slide-pages. One can select a specific page, click on it, and zoom it back in to the presentation screen.

Highlight boxes help direct the focus of attention of the audience on a specific part of the current slide by dragging a rectangle on the screen while holding down the left mouse button. With the exception of the selected rectangle, the presentation screen greys out and gets blurry. Multiple highlight boxes per slide are possible, and slides containing highlit boxes can be saved for future reuse.

Spotlight effects deliver dynamic highlighting effects. Controlled by a special key a highlighting circle will appear and follow the mouse cursor as it moves over the slide.

== Program ==
Impressive is written in the Python programming language, and PyGame is used as the windowing API. Its intended user interface is the command-line.

The computer graphics rendering of PDF document slides is delivered by Xpdf, MuPDF or Ghostscript. OpenGL is used by Impressive for hardware acceleration as a prerequisite for the graphical effects and various 'eye candy'. While hardware with graphics processing units (GPU) supporting OpenGL 2.0 or OpenGL ES 2.0 are required, Impressive even runs on the Raspberry Pi.

== License ==
Impressive is open-source under the GNU General Public License version 2.0 (GPLv2).
