= Rhizobium leguminosarum exopolysaccharide glucosyl ketal-pyruvate-transferase =

Identifiers
- EC no.: 2.5.1.98

Databases
- IntEnz: IntEnz view
- BRENDA: BRENDA entry
- ExPASy: NiceZyme view
- KEGG: KEGG entry
- MetaCyc: metabolic pathway
- PRIAM: profile
- PDB structures: RCSB PDB PDBe PDBsum
Search
- PMC: articles
- PubMed: articles
- NCBI: proteins

Rhizobium leguminosarum exopolysaccharide glucosyl ketal-pyruvate-transferase (EC 2.5.1.98, PssM) is an enzyme with systematic name phosphoenolpyruvate:(D-GlcA-beta-(1->4)-2-O-Ac-D-GlcA-beta-(1->4)-D-Glc-beta-(1->4)-(3-O-CH3-CH2CH(OH)C(O)-D-Gal-beta-(1->4)-D-Glc-beta-(1->4)-D-Glc-beta-(1->4)-D-Glc-beta-(1->6))-2(or3)-O-Ac-D-Glc-alpha-(1->6))n 4,6-O-(1-carboxyethan-1,1-diyl)transferase . This enzyme catalyses the following chemical reaction

phosphoenolpyruvate + [D-GlcA-beta-(1->4)-2-O-Ac-D-GlcA-beta-(1->4)-D-Glc-beta-(1->4)-[3-O-CH3-CH2CH(OH)C(O)-D-Gal-beta-(1->4)-D-Glc-beta-(1->4)-D-Glc-beta-(1->4)-D-Glc-beta-(1->6)]-2(or3)-O-Ac-D-Glc-alpha-(1->6)]_{n} $\rightleftharpoons$ [D-GlcA-beta-(1->4)-2-O-Ac-D-GlcA-beta-(1->4)-D-Glc-beta-(1->4)-[3-O-CH3-CH2CH(OH)C(O)-D-Gal-beta-(1->3)-4,6-CH3(COO-)C-D-Glc-beta-(1->4)-D-Glc-beta-(1->4)-D-Glc-beta-(1->6)]-2(or3)-O-Ac-D-Glc-alpha-(1->6)]_{n} + phosphate

The enzyme is responsible for pyruvylation of subterminal glucose in the acidic octasaccharide repeating unit of the exopolysaccharide of Rhizobium leguminosarum.
