= Equine exertional rhabdomyolysis =

Muscular syndrome of horses

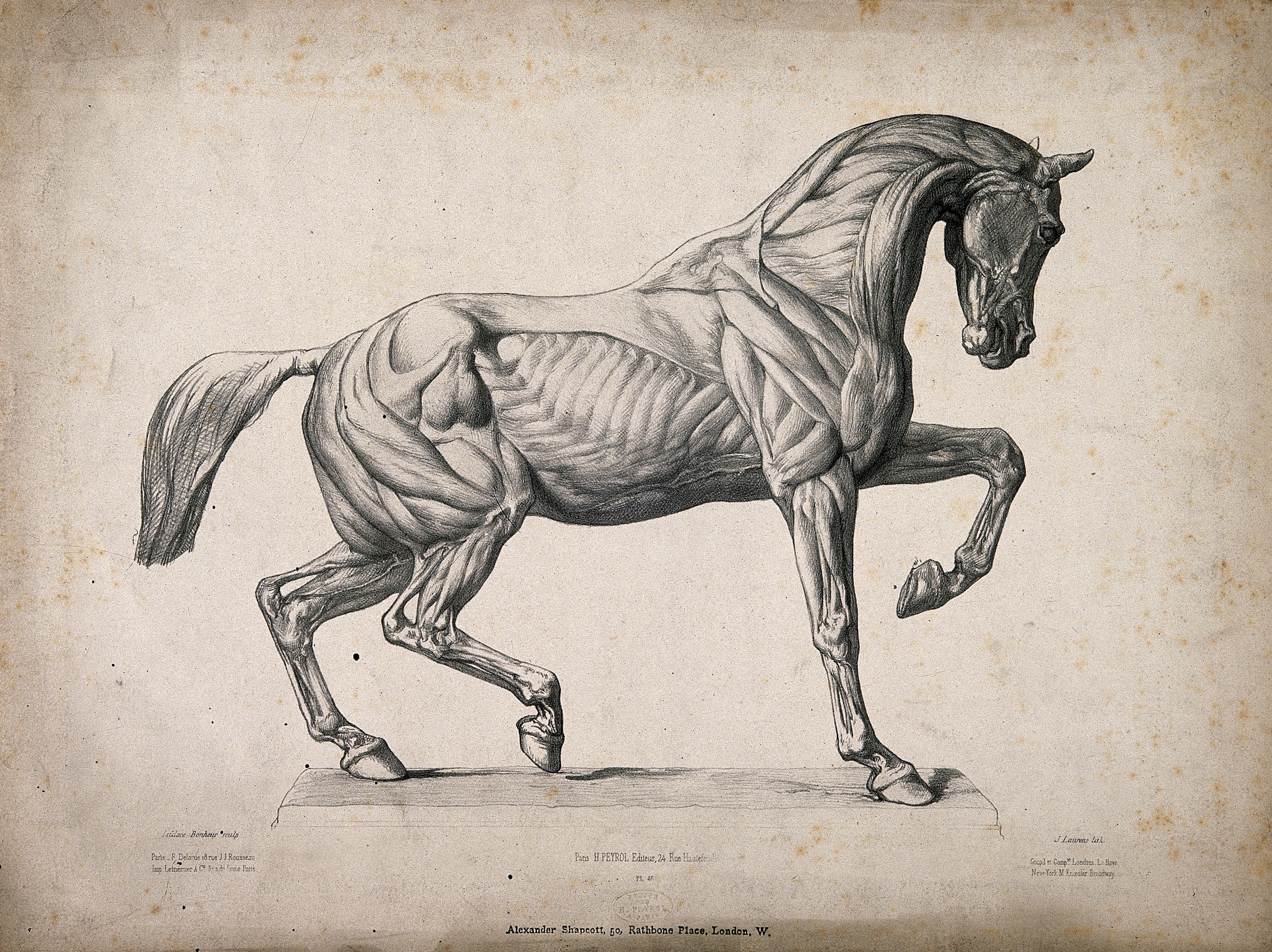
Equine Musculoskeletal Engraving

Equine exertional rhabdomyolysis (ER) is a syndrome that affects the skeletal muscles within a horse. This syndrome causes the muscle to break down which is generally associated with exercise and diet regime. Depending on the severity, there are various types of ER, including sporadic (i.e., Tying-Up, Monday Morning Sickness/Disease, Azoturia) and chronic (i.e., Polysaccharide Storage Myopathy (PSSM) and Recurrent Exertional Rhabdomyolysis (RER)).

== Types of equine exertional rhabdomyolysis (ER) ==
Equine Exertional Rhabdomyolysis (ER) is a general term used to define both sporadic - (infrequent) and chronic - (repeated) manifestations of the condition. The severity of the condition defines what type of ER a horse has.

=== Sporadic equine exertional rhabdomyolysis (ER) ===
The types of equine ER that are considered sporadic include tying-up, also commonly referred to as Monday morning sickness and/or Monday morning disease, and azoturia also known as black water disease, set fast, and/or paralytic myoglobinuria. Tying-up related is mild as compared to azoturia, which is the more severe case of sporadic ER.

Sporadic equine exertional rhabdomyolysis (ER) can be found in any horse regardless of breed, age, or gender. Most cases relate to excessive glycogen stored due to diet patterns.

=== Chronic equine exertional rhabdomyolysis (ER) ===
Chronic equine exertional rhabdomyolysis (ER) includes the predisposition of two main types, polysaccharide storage myopathy (PSSM) and recurrent exertional rhabdomyolysis (RER). Each type is specific to horses based on factors of breed, age, and genetics.

Polysaccharide Storage Myopathy (PSSM) is commonly found in calm muscular breeds such as quarter horses and Belgian drafts. However, any horse that can store excess amounts of glycogen, usually genetic, can develop this form of ER.

Recurrent Exertional Rhabdomyolysis (RER) is commonly found in breeds that are high strung such as Arabians and thoroughbreds. However, any horse can develop this type of ER if it displays abnormal muscle contractions.

== Causes and Process of ER ==
Beyond the probable hereditary factor, no other single cause is known to trigger ER in horses. Due to the "Exertional" component, exercise is seen in every case of ER regardless of type and severity. However, exercise cannot alone be the singular cause of ER, rather it is always accompanied by another factor. In the end several factors together can cause ER.

Other factors that will pair with exercise to form potential ER can be dependent on the type of ER.

Sporadic ER can include the following possible factors:

- The overfeeding of simple carbohydrates (grass-hay, corn)
- Excessive heat with electrolyte imbalances, especially seen with potassium
- The work of a horse after a period of rest, if diet was not reduced
- Hormone imbalance
- Thyroid hormone imbalance with hypothyroidism
- Vitamin E deficiency
- Muscles worked without proper training causes contractions leading to myopathy

Chronic ER can include the following factors:

- Genetic excessive storage of glycogen (carbohydrate storage in the body) paired with abnormal polysaccharide sugar intake - strictly related to Polysaccharide Storage Myopathy (PSSM)
- Excessive rest periods followed by intense return to work on a high-grain diet - Strictly related to Polysaccharide Storage Myopathy (PSSM)
- Abnormal muscle contractions - strictly related to Recurrent Exertional Rhabdomyolysis (RER)
- Hormonal imbalances - strictly related to Recurrent Exertional Rhabdomyolysis (RER)
- Stress and over stimulation - strictly related to Recurrent Exertional Rhabdomyolysis (RER)

=== Sporadic ER Process ===
The more factors that are present, the greater the likelihood that the horse will develop ER. However, the most common cause of ER is an imbalance between the animal's diet and its workload, especially on a high-grain diet.

Sporadic ER occurs if there is an imbalance of glycogen in muscles. On days the animal is not being ridden or working, if the horse ingests feed packed with simple carbohydrates, this can cause too much energy in the form of glucose to be created. When this extra energy is stored, it creates excessive amounts of glycogen in the muscles. Once the horse returns to work and/or exercise, the glycogen can rapidly form to usable energy. If there is too much of it, this can cause an imbalance, which can form into Sporadic ER.

The excess glycogen within the muscle cells that lack oxygen begin to function anaerobically to produce the needed Adenosine Triphosphate. The anaerobic work creates a buildup of waste products, lactic acid, and heat. This subsequently alters the cell by preventing the cell's enzymes from functioning and the myofilaments from contracting efficiently. The cell membranes may then be damaged if the horse is forced to continue work, which allows muscle enzymes and myoglobin to leak into the bloodstream.

This leads to the body building up a store of glycogen from converted carbohydrates in muscle cells. Glycogen is then depleted during work, and restocked when a horse rests. Oxygen-carrying blood metabolizes glycogen, but the blood can not flow fast enough to metabolize the excess stored glycogen. The glycogen that is not metabolized aerobically (by the oxygenated blood) must then be metabolized anaerobically, which then creates the cell waste products and heat, and ER has begun.

Myoglobin can be released into the bloodstream from damaged muscle tissue. If released, myoglobin is not easily cleansed form the bloodstream. Due to this issue it can transfer to the Nephrons which connect to the kidneys. The kidneys, much like the blood stream, are not meant to cleanse myoglobin from themselves; this can lead the Nephrons to be blocked which could lead to kidney failure, and if severe enough could be fatal.

=== Chronic ER Process ===
Chronic ER occurs in horses with a potential genetic link to ER; however, this depends on the type of chronic ER.

In the case of Polysaccharide Storage Myopathy (PSSM) the storage of excess glycogen is also common for this type of chronic ER, however, it is more a predisposed genetic condition, which can occur more frequently. Rather than the excess storage of glycogen due to high-grain diets and excessive rest, excess glycogen is stored because insulin stored in the muscles tells it to. However, if excessive rest is also allowed, this can be cause for an even greater probability that PSSM ER could develop.

Regarding Recurrent Exertional Rhabdomyolysis (RER) it is muscular contractions that can lead to this type of ER. When contracting muscles, intercellular calcium is released. If the horse has a predisposed condition that allows for abnormal muscle contraction, calcium ions are abnormally released. The calcium can then become free-roaming which can trigger abnormal muscle contractions.

There are also toxicities that can cause signs of ER. For example, if a horse were to ingest the blister beetles and/or Day Blooming Jasmine - a broadleaf evergreen shrub, each can cause signs of ER. The blister beetle is known to distribute a toxin known as cantharidin. If ingested, this toxin can cause severe gastrointestinal issues, which if left untreated could cause nephritis. Ingesting ionophores toxins, such as those found in day blooming jasmine, can cause the heart muscle to become inflamed.

== Symptoms ==
A horse developing ER can start to show signs as early as directly after exercise, however, for mild cases, signs may not be seen until after the horse is cooled down. Signs for both sporadic and chronic ER can include a reluctance to move, stiffness or shortened gait when the animal is forced to move typically found in the hind legs, and muscle spasms or cramps, with hard, painful muscles (especially the hindquarters) when palpated. Other signs include excessive sweating, and labored breathing, which can be caused from the pain, increased pulse and red urine which can be directly linked to potential myoglobin being released into the kidneys.

If an observer is unfamiliar with ER, initial symptoms may appear to be tiredness or perhaps lameness, but the condition is far more complex.

Signs of a severe bout of Sporadic or Chronic ER may include reluctance to move, lying down and refusal to rise, remaining in a singular stance such as sit, and can develop lameness permanently due to muscle deterioration. Usually, a correlation exists between how long is needed for the signs to be seen and how severe the bout of ER is, with the more severe bouts displaying signs right after work has begun.

If signs of severe ER are seen, the horse should not be moved. Movement can cause further muscle damage. If the animal is far from the barn, trailering it back is preferable to walking. A veterinarian should then be contacted.

== Treatment ==
Treatment for cases of ER both Sporadic and Chronic should be handled by a licensed veterinarian.

=== Mild or moderate cases ===
For mild or moderate cases a vet may recommend or prescribe a Nonsteroidal anti-inflammatory drug (NSAID). These are drugs such as Flunixin meglumine (Banamine), Naproxen (Equiproxen), or Ketoprofen. This will help to bring the inflammation down while also acting as a pain reliever. NSAID's should not be used for prolonged periods of time as they can cause damage to the kidneys. Grain or pellets should be withheld. Introducing diet changes should be done gradually, and feed should be done according to work amount. To improve blood flow to the muscles and help with muscle spasms, heat therapy and equine massage may be beneficial.

For bouts of Sporadic ER, a horse can be turned out to pasture after allowing for a few days of rest and continued use of prescribed medications should there be any.

=== Severe cases ===
A horse may need fluids, especially if its urine is colored, it is receiving NSAIDs, or it is dehydrated. Fluids increase the production of urine that, in turn, helps flush out the excess, and potentially damaging, myoglobin from the kidneys and reduce NSAID-produced kidney damage. Fluids should be administered until the urine is clear, which usually takes from a few hours to a few days.

Vasodilators, such as acepromazine, can help improve blood flow to the muscles, but acepromazine only should be administered if it is prescribed by a licensed veterinarian, as it can lower the animal's blood pressure and can cause collapse in a severely dehydrated horse. The human drug dantrolene is sometimes given to alleviate the muscle spasms and prevent further degeneration of muscle tissue.

Vitamin E is an antioxidant, so may help prevent further cell degeneration in the affected muscles. However, vitamin E products must be used with caution if they also contain selenium.

Bicarbonate does not help offset any lactic acid in the bloodstream, as lactic acid generally only accumulates in the affected muscles.

Except to get to its stall, a horse showing signs of severe ER should not be moved until comfortable enough to do so eagerly. This may take several days. After this point, hand-walking the horse a few times each day or turnout in a pasture or paddock is needed.

=== Chronic ER Cases ===
For horses who exhibit chronic ER, treatment will vary according to genetic and in some cases breed. Management is key for treating horses with Chronic ER as in most cases this type of ER doesn't go away. Reducing the trigger effects will help with management of the animal.

In some cases a veterinarian may prescribe tranquilizers if the horse is thrashing or nervous. This will help to keep the horse calm and provide some pain relief. Tranquilizers may also be advised to be used during training upon the horse returning to work.

Changing diet regime to a high-fat low-starch can be beneficial for the horse, as it can help with excitement.

=== Returning the animal to work ===
Symptoms may take several days to several weeks to subside, all depending on severity and type of ER. If initial symptoms have subsided a horse may be allowed turn-out. A horse may be returned to work if symptoms have ceased and is no longer on NSAIDs or other prescribed drugs related to treatment of ER, this can otherwise can hide signs of another bout of ER. If NSAIDs or other treatment drugs are needed to keep the horse comfortable, or if the horse is reluctant to continue work, the animal is not yet ready for a return to its regular training program. Blood tests such as Creatine Kinase Concentration (CK), Aspartate Transaminase Levels (AST), and/or Lactate Dehydrogenase (LDH) should be normal before the horse is returned to work.

== Prognosis ==
Depending on the damage to the muscle tissue and the type of ER prognosis can vary. Signs of a positive prognosis may include a horse being able to stay up and not lying down too much. If the horse appears to be back to normal within 24 hours, the prognosis is better. In some cases, if the horse goes into kidney failure due to untreated myoglobinuria, results could be fatal.

== Prevention ==
=== Diet ===
For bouts of Sporadic ER, reducing any extra energy in a horse's diet is essential. Decreasing carbohydrates and increasing the daily intake of hay or pasture can usually accomplish this. Grain may need to be cut in half and feed ration should also be downsized prior to rest days. Feeding a well balanced diet of both vitamins and minerals can also be beneficial.

For bouts of Chronic ER, a high-fat low-starch diet can be beneficial. Gradually the horse should be introduced to this new diet. For some cases of Chronic ER such as RER, the horse may need a higher intake of calories. This is where feeds specially created and designed for ER will be necessary.

=== Exercise ===
For bouts of Sporadic ER proper conditioning is essential in prevention. In using proper training techniques a horse should be warmed up thoroughly before intense training and/or riding. The same should be done when cooling down. Ensure that the horse is cared for to allow the immune system to recover before continuing training.

A horse ideally should receive exercise once or twice a day to prevent the recurrence of ER. Breaks in the horse's exercise schedule should be avoided.

For bouts of Chronic ER, the focus should be on preventing overexcitement. This can be accomplished by allowing pasture time, utilizing a hot walker, and minimizing stall time. Horses with Chronic ER should also be injected with a low-dose tranquilizer during intense training to help with overexcitement.

=== Supplements and drugs ===
As with any supplements and drugs, conferring with a veterinarian as to the recommended dosages is best. Some drugs are not allowed in competition and may need to be withheld a few days before.

Adding potassium and salt to the diet may be beneficial to horses that suffer from recurrent bouts of ER both chronic and sporadic. Horses in hard training may need a vitamin E supplement. The horse may also be deficient in selenium and in need of supplement.

Other drugs that have been used with success include phenytoin, dantrolene, and dimethylglycine.
