= Joe Hancock =

Quarter Horse stallion and sire (1926–1943)

Joe Hancock P-455
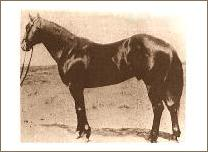
- Breed: Quarter Horse
- Sire: John Wilkens
- Grandsire: Peter McCue
- Dam: Hancock mare
- Maternal grandsire: Percheron stud
- Sex: Stallion
- Foaled: 1926
- Country: United States
- Color: brown
- Breeder: John Jackson Hancock
- Owner: 6666 Ranch

Record
- unraced officially

Earnings
- unraced officially

Major wins
- unraced

Awards
- unraced and unshown

Honors
- AQHA Hall of Fame

Joe Hancock (1926–1943) was an influential Quarter Horse sire in the early years of the American Quarter Horse Association (or AQHA).

== Life ==
Joe Hancock was registered as number 455 in the American Quarter Horse Association (or AQHA). He was foaled most probably in 1926, although the dates are somewhat hazy. He was a brown stallion, registered as bred by an unknown breeder, but later research determined that his breeder was John Jackson Hancock. His sire was a son of Peter McCue named John Wilkens and his dam was a half Percheron mare, although the AQHA's stud book gives his dam as "unknown." John Wilkens was inbred to the Thoroughbred stallion Voltigeur, as well as being a descendant of the Thoroughbred Glencoe. When he was registered, he was owned by the Tom L. Burnett Estate in Fort Worth, Texas, which later became the 6666 Ranch.

Joe Hancock had a streak on his face and, when grown, stood 15.3 hands high. Unlike his sire, he had good feet.

== Racing career ==
Joe Hancock raced in match races for a number of years, although no official records of these races exist. At one point, there were advertisements run in the Fort Worth Star Telegram and the Daily Oklahoman stating that "Joe Hancock is open to the world, from standing start to 3/8ths of a mile." There were no folks willing to match their horses against Joe Hancock. All of Joe Hancock's racing took place before the formation of the AQHA in 1940.

== Breeding record ==
By the time the AQHA was founded, Joe Hancock was busy siring ranch horses on the 6666 Ranch. He sired seven foals that earned their Race Register of Merit with the AQHA. He also sired two foals that earned their Performance Register of Merit with the AQHA – Brown Joe Hancock and Red Man.

== Death and honors ==
Joe Hancock died in 1943 and in 1992 he was inducted into the AQHA Hall of Fame. In 2007 Western Horseman magazine chose Joe Hancock as number three on their list of top ten ranch horse bloodlines.

== Pedigree ==
Barney Owens
Dan Tucker
Lady Bug
Peter McCue
Voltigeur (TB)
Nora M (TB)
Kitty Clyde (TB)
John Wilkens
Alarm (TB)
Wawekus (TB)
Maggie B B (TB)
Katie Wawekus (TB)
Voltigeur (TB)
Lucy Hitt (TB)
Miss Hitt (TB)
Joe Hancock
unknown
Percheron stallion
unknown
Hancock mare
unknown
Mundell mare
unknown
