= First impression =

First impression or first impressions may refer to:

== Terminology ==
- First impression (law), legal term for (a) the initial presentation to a court of a particular question of law, or (b) a case which sets forth a completely original issue of law for decision by the courts
  - Prima facie
- First impression (psychology), a term used in psychology
- First edition, or first impression, the first printing of a book or other printed publication

== Film and television ==
- First Impressions (TV series), a 1988 American situation comedy that aired on CBS
- First Impressions (game show), aka. First Impressions with Dana Carvey, a 2016 American television game show that aired on USA Network
- "First Impressions" (Angel), a 2000 television episode
- "First Impressions" (Doctors), a 2004 television episode
- "First Impressions" (Hotel Portofino), a 2022 television episode
- "First Impressions" (The Royal), a 2003 television episode

== Literature ==
- First Impressions, the original title of Jane Austen's novel Pride and Prejudice

== Music ==
- First Impressions (musical), a 1959 Broadway musical based on Pride and Prejudice
- First Impressions (album), by Olivia Newton-John, 1974
- First Impressions, an album by the Impressions, or the title song, 1975
- First Impressions, an album by Tom Harrell, 2015
- First Impressions (James TW EP), 2016
- First Impressions (Thrice EP), 1999
