= Old Sorrel =

Quarter Horse stallion and sire

- Breed: Quarter Horse
- Sire: Hickory Bill
- Grandsire: Peter McCue
- Dam: Dr. Rose mare
- Maternal grandsire: unknown
- Sex: Stallion
- Foaled: 1915
- Died: 1945
- Country: United States
- Color: Chestnut
- Breeder: George Clegg
- Owner: King Ranch

Honors
- American Quarter Horse Hall of Fame

Old Sorrel, sometimes known as The Old Sorrel (1915–1945), was a Quarter Horse stallion who was the foundation of the King Ranch linebreeding program for Quarter Horses, and the cornerstone of the King Ranch horse breeding program.

== Life ==
Old Sorrel was foaled in 1915 and was purchased that same year, by Caesar Kleberg of King Ranch.

proved himself worth breeding through ranch work on the ranch, before being used as the foundation of the King Ranch Quarter Horse linebreeding program. He died in 1945, with his last foal crop being in 1943. He was a sorrel stallion bred by George Clegg of Alice, Texas and sold by Clegg as a foal along with his dam for $125 to the King Ranch. The King Ranch owned him until he died at the age of 31 in 1949.

== Career ==
J. K. Northway, the veterinarian on the King Ranch, described Old Sorrel as

I saw Richard Kleberg and George Clegg rope off him and ride him all morning, and then race him in the afternoon. Although a stallion, and treated as such, his daily work consisted of regular ranch routine with the remuda. Bob had made him into a superior cow horse in every respect. You could rope, cut, or do any other ranch work on him, and he was not just adequate – he was superior in every respect.

Robert J. Kleberg III, the Bob in the quote from Northway, who was one of the owners of the King Ranch and who managed it from the 1920s through to the 1950s, said that the Old Sorrel was "the best cow horse I ever rode, but he was also a good running horse. He had that well balanced look and the feel of a racehorse."

When the American Quarter Horse Association (or AQHA) was founded in 1940, The Old Sorrel was already twenty-five years old, but the King Ranch registered him amongst the very first horses that the AQHA accepted for registration. He was given number 209 in the registry, and registered as bred by George Clegg of Alice, Texas. His sire was Hickory Bill by Peter McCue and out of a Dr. Rose mare. The dam was a mare of Thoroughbred breeding that Clegg had bought from a Dr. Rose who was a dentist in Mexico as well as running a few ranches. Rose had bought some Thoroughbred mares in Kentucky to improve his horses, and eventually sold some of the mares to Clegg, without any breeding being attributed to any of them.

== Breeding record ==
The Old Sorrel sired 116 horses registered with the AQHA, but through the linebreeding program the King Ranch used, almost every horse the King Ranch registered from 1940 to the early 1960s was at least a descendant of Old Sorrel, and most were heavily inbred to him.

Among his famous offspring were Cardinal, Solis, Little Richard P-17, Tomate Laureles P-19, Silver King, Macanudo and Hired Hand. His grandsons included Wimpy P-1, Ranchero, Peppy, and Pep-Up.

== Honors ==
He was inducted into the AQHA Hall of Fame in 1990.

== Pedigree ==
Barney Owens
Dan Tucker
Lady Bug (Butt Cut)
Peter McCue
Voltigeur (TB)
Nora M (TB)
Kitty Clyde (TB)
Hickory Bill
Himyar (TB)
The Hero (TB)
Lulu S (TB)
Lucretia M
Jack Traveler
Bird
Kitty Clyde (TB)
Old Sorrel 1915 Chestnut
unknown
Dr. Rose Mare
unknown
