= American Quarter Horse =

American horse breed

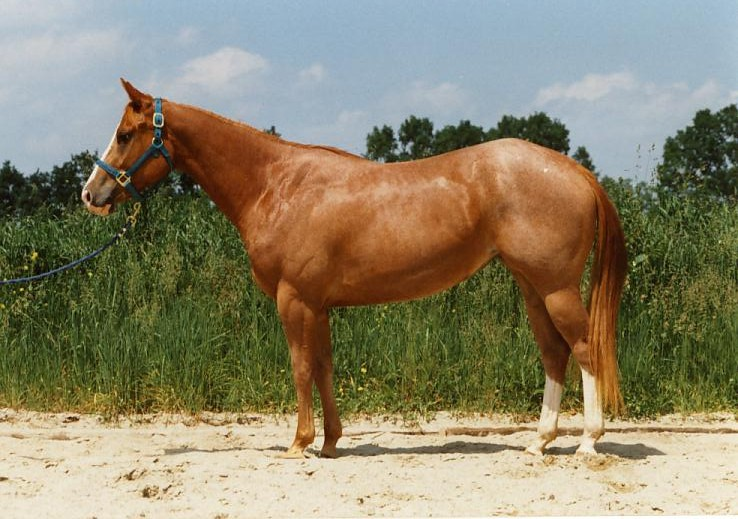
- A chestnut American Quarter Horse
- Other names: Quarter Horse
- Country of origin: United States

Traits
- Distinguishing features: Great speed over short distances; short, refined head; strong, well-muscled body, featuring a broad chest and powerful, rounded hindquarters

Breed standards
- American Quarter Horse Association (AQHA)

The American Quarter Horse, or Quarter Horse, is an American breed of horse that excels at sprinting short distances. Its name is derived from its ability to outrun other horse breeds in races of 1/4 mi (0.40 km) or less; some have been clocked at speeds up to 44 mph (71 km/h). The development of the Quarter Horse traces to the 1600s.

The American Quarter Horse is the most popular breed in the United States, and the American Quarter Horse Association is the largest breed registry in the world, with almost three million living American Quarter Horses registered in 2014. The American Quarter Horse is well known both as a race horse and for its performance in rodeos, horse shows, and as a working ranch horse.

The compact body of the American Quarter Horse is well suited for the quick maneuvers required in reining, cutting, working cow horse, barrel racing, calf roping, and other western riding events, especially those involving live cattle. The American Quarter Horse is also used in English disciplines, driving, show jumping, dressage, hunting, and many other equestrian activities.

The Texas Legislature designated the American Quarter Horse as the official "State Horse of Texas" in 2009, and Oklahoma also designated the Quarter Horse as its official state horse in 2022.

== Breed history ==
=== Colonial era ===
In the 1600s, imported English Thoroughbred horses were first bred with assorted local horses on the Eastern seaboard of colonial America.

One of the most famous of these early imports was Janus, a Thoroughbred who was the grandson of the Godolphin Arabian. He was foaled in 1746, and imported to colonial Virginia in 1756. The influence of Thoroughbreds like Janus contributed genes crucial to the development of the colonial "Quarter Horse". The resulting horse was small, hardy, quick, and was used as a work horse during the week and a race horse on the weekends.

As flat racing became popular with the colonists, the Quarter Horse gained even more popularity as a sprinter over courses that, by necessity, were shorter than the classic racecourses of England. These courses were often no more than a straight stretch of road or flat piece of open land. When competing against a Thoroughbred, local sprinters often won. As the Thoroughbred breed became established in America, many colonial Quarter Horses were included in the original American stud books. This began a long association between the Thoroughbred breed and what would later become officially known as the "Quarter Horse", named after the 1/4 mile (0.40 km) race distance at which it excelled. Some Quarter Horses have been clocked at up to 44 mph (71 km/h).

=== Westward expansion ===
In the 19th century, pioneers heading West needed a hardy, willing horse. On the Great Plains, settlers encountered horses that descended from the Spanish stock Hernán Cortés and other Conquistadors had introduced into the viceroyalty of New Spain, which became the Southwestern United States and Mexico.

The horses of the West included herds of feral animals known as Mustangs, as well as horses domesticated by Native Americans, including the Comanche, Shoshoni and Nez Perce tribes. As the colonial Quarter Horse was crossed with these western horses, the pioneers found that the new crossbred had innate "cow sense", a natural instinct for working with cattle, making it popular with cattlemen on ranches.

=== Development as a distinct breed ===
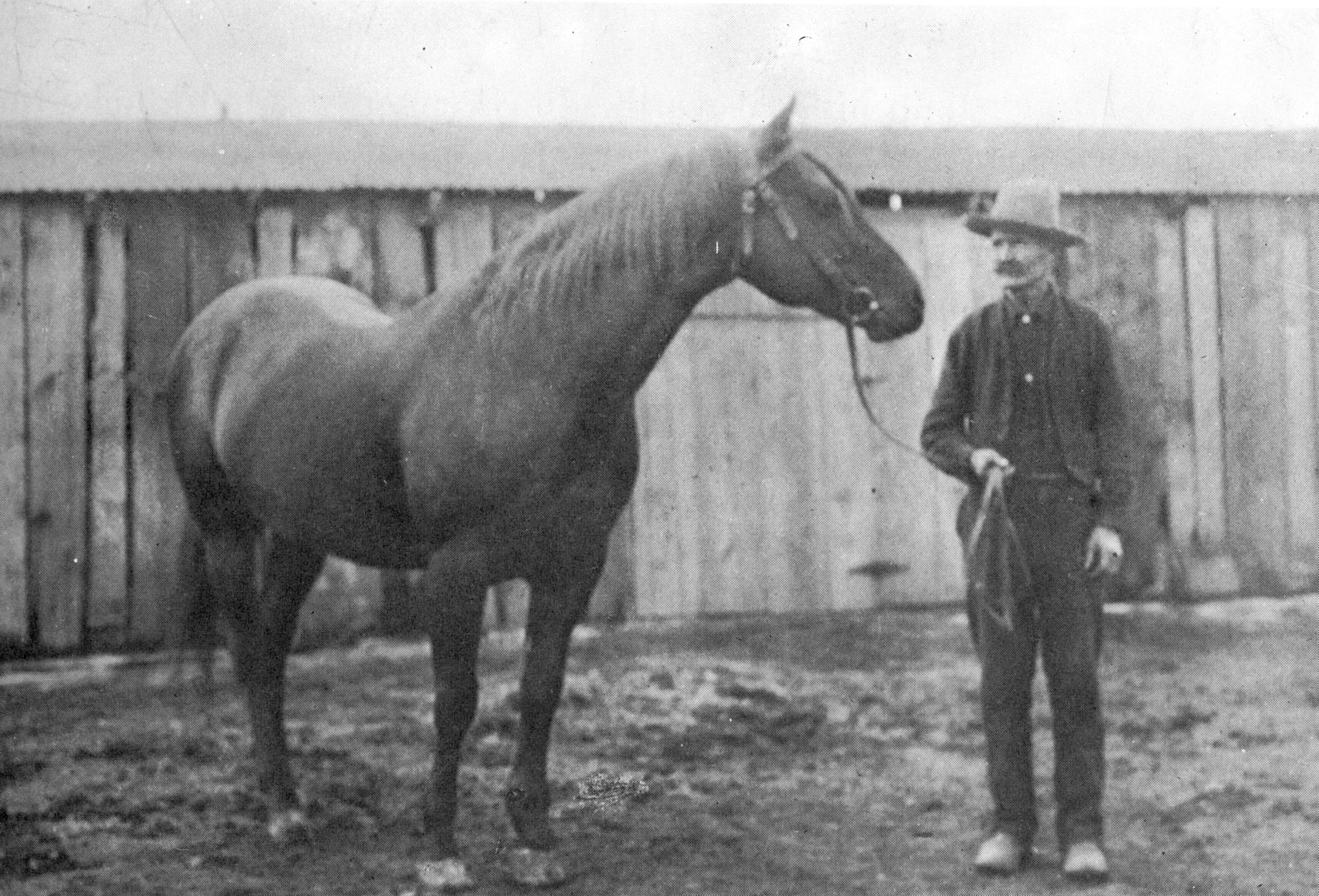
A photograph of Peter McCue, taken in Oklahoma around 1905

Early foundation sires of Quarter Horse type included Steel Dust, foaled 1843; Shiloh (or Old Shiloh), foaled 1844; Old Cold Deck (1862); Lock's Rondo, one of many "Rondo" horses, foaled in 1880; Old Billy—again, one of many "Billy" horses—foaled c. 1880; Traveler, a stallion of unknown breeding, known to have been in Texas by 1889; and Peter McCue, foaled 1895, registered as a Thoroughbred but of disputed pedigree. Another early foundation sire for the breed was Copperbottom, foaled in 1828, who tracks his lineage through the Byerley Turk, a foundation sire of the Thoroughbred horse breed.

The main duty of the ranch horse in the American West was working cattle. Even after the invention of the automobile, horses were still irreplaceable for handling livestock on the range. Thus, major Texas cattle ranches, such as the King Ranch, the 6666 (Four Sixes) Ranch, and the Waggoner Ranch played a significant role in the development of the modern Quarter Horse. The skills required by cowboys and their horses became the foundation of the rodeo, a contest which began with informal competition between cowboys and expanded to become a major competitive event throughout the west. The Quarter Horse dominates in events that require speed as well as the ability to handle cattle.

Sprint races were also popular weekend entertainment and racing became a source of economic gain for breeders. As a result, more Thoroughbred blood was added into the developing American Quarter Horse breed. The American Quarter Horse also benefitted from the addition of Arabian, Morgan, and even Standardbred bloodlines.

In 1940, the American Quarter Horse Association (AQHA) was formed by a group of horsemen and ranchers from the Southwestern United States dedicated to preserving the pedigrees of their ranch horses. After winning the 1941 Fort Worth Exposition and Fat Stock Show grand champion stallion, the horse honored with the first registration number, P-1, was Wimpy, a descendant of the King Ranch foundation sire Old Sorrel. Other sires alive at the founding of the AQHA were given the earliest registration numbers Joe Reed P-3, Chief P-5, Oklahoma Star P-6, Cowboy P-12, and Waggoner's Rainy Day P-13. The Thoroughbred race horse Three Bars, alive in the early years of the AQHA, is recognized by the American Quarter Horse Hall of Fame as one of the significant foundation sires for the Quarter Horse breed. Other significant Thoroughbred sires seen in early AQHA pedigrees include Rocket Bar, Top Deck and Depth Charge.

== "Appendix" and "Foundation" horses ==
Since the American Quarter Horse was formally established as a breed, the AQHA stud book has remained open to additional Thoroughbred blood via a performance standard. An "Appendix" American Quarter Horse is a first generation cross between a registered Thoroughbred and an American Quarter Horse or a cross between a "numbered" American Quarter Horse and an "appendix" American Quarter Horse. The resulting offspring is registered in the "appendix" of the American Quarter Horse Association's studbook, hence the nickname. Horses listed in the appendix may be entered in competition, but offspring are not initially eligible for full AQHA registration. If the Appendix horse meets certain conformational criteria and is shown or raced successfully in sanctioned AQHA events, the horse can earn its way from the appendix into the permanent studbook, making its offspring eligible for AQHA registration.

Since Quarter Horse/Thoroughbred crosses continue to enter the official registry of the American Quarter Horse breed, this creates a continual gene flow from the Thoroughbred breed into the American Quarter Horse breed, which has altered many of the characteristics that typified the breed in the early years of its formation. Some breeders argue that the continued addition of Thoroughbred bloodlines are beginning to compromise the integrity of the breed standard. Some favor the earlier style of horse and have created several separate organizations to promote and register "Foundation" Quarter Horses.

== Modern American Quarter Horse ==
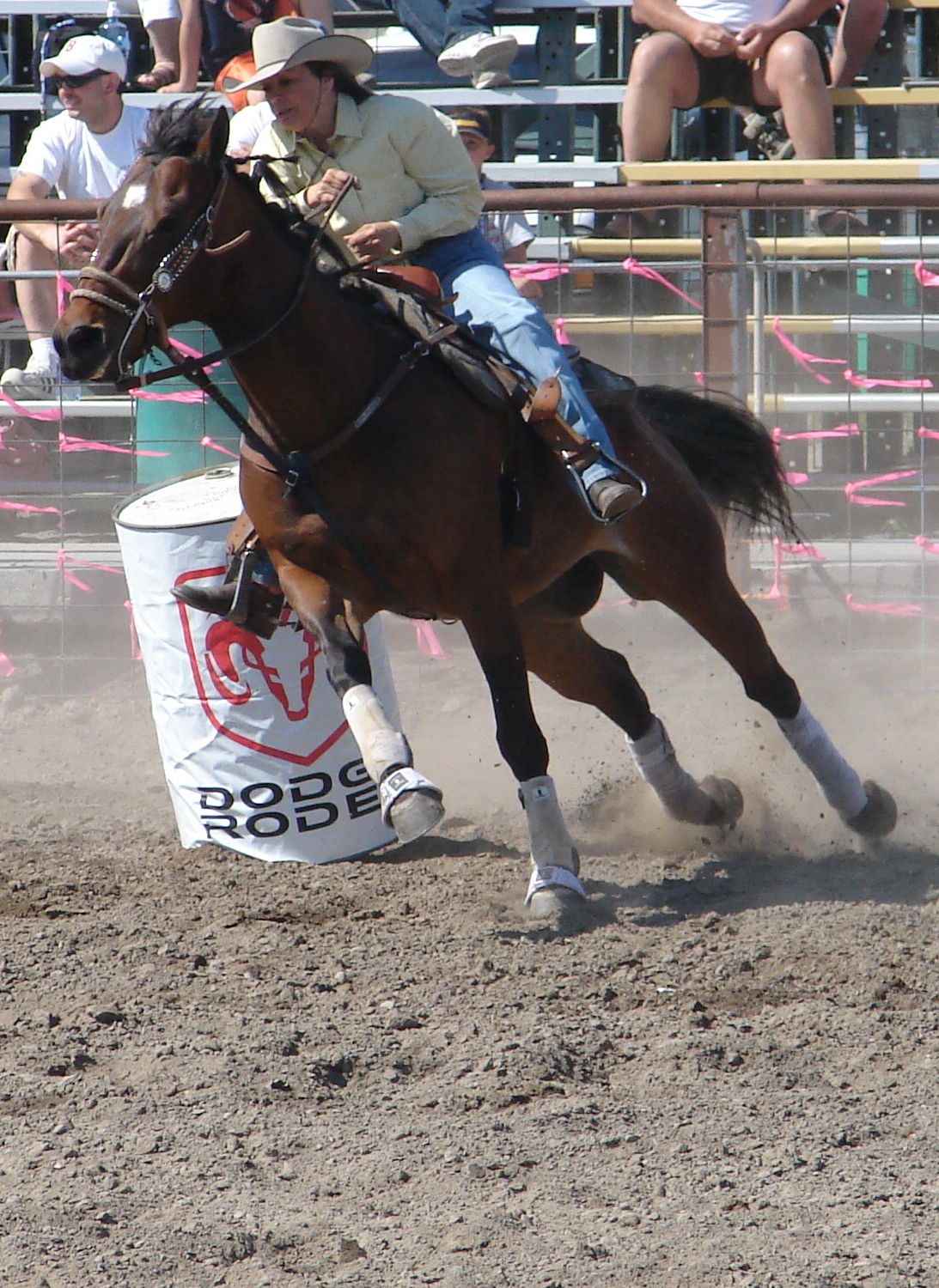
The Quarter Horse is well-suited for the western disciplines.

The American Quarter Horse is a show horse, race horse, reining and cutting horse, rodeo competitor, ranch horse, and all-around family horse. Quarter Horses are commonly used in rodeo events such as barrel racing, calf roping and team roping; and gymkhana or O-Mok-See. Other stock horse events such as cutting and reining are open to all breeds but are dominated by American Quarter Horse.

The breed is not only well-suited for western riding and cattle work. Many race tracks offer Quarter Horses a wide assortment of pari-mutuel horse racing with earnings in the millions. Quarter Horses have also been trained to compete in dressage and show jumping. They are also used for recreational trail riding and in mounted police units.

The American Quarter Horse has also been exported worldwide. European nations such as Germany and Italy have imported large numbers of Quarter Horses. Next to the American Quarter Horse Association (which also encompasses Quarter Horses from Canada), the second largest registry of Quarter Horses is in Brazil, followed by Australia. In the UK the breed is also becoming very popular, especially with the two Western riding Associations, the Western Horse Association and The Western Equestrian Society. The British American Quarter Horse breed society is the AQHA-UK. With the internationalization of the discipline of reining and its acceptance as one of the official seven events of the World Equestrian Games, there is a growing international interest in Quarter Horses. The American Quarter Horse is the most popular breed in the United States, and the American Quarter Horse Association is the largest breed registry in the world, with nearly 3 million American Quarter Horses registered worldwide in 2014.

== Breed characteristics ==
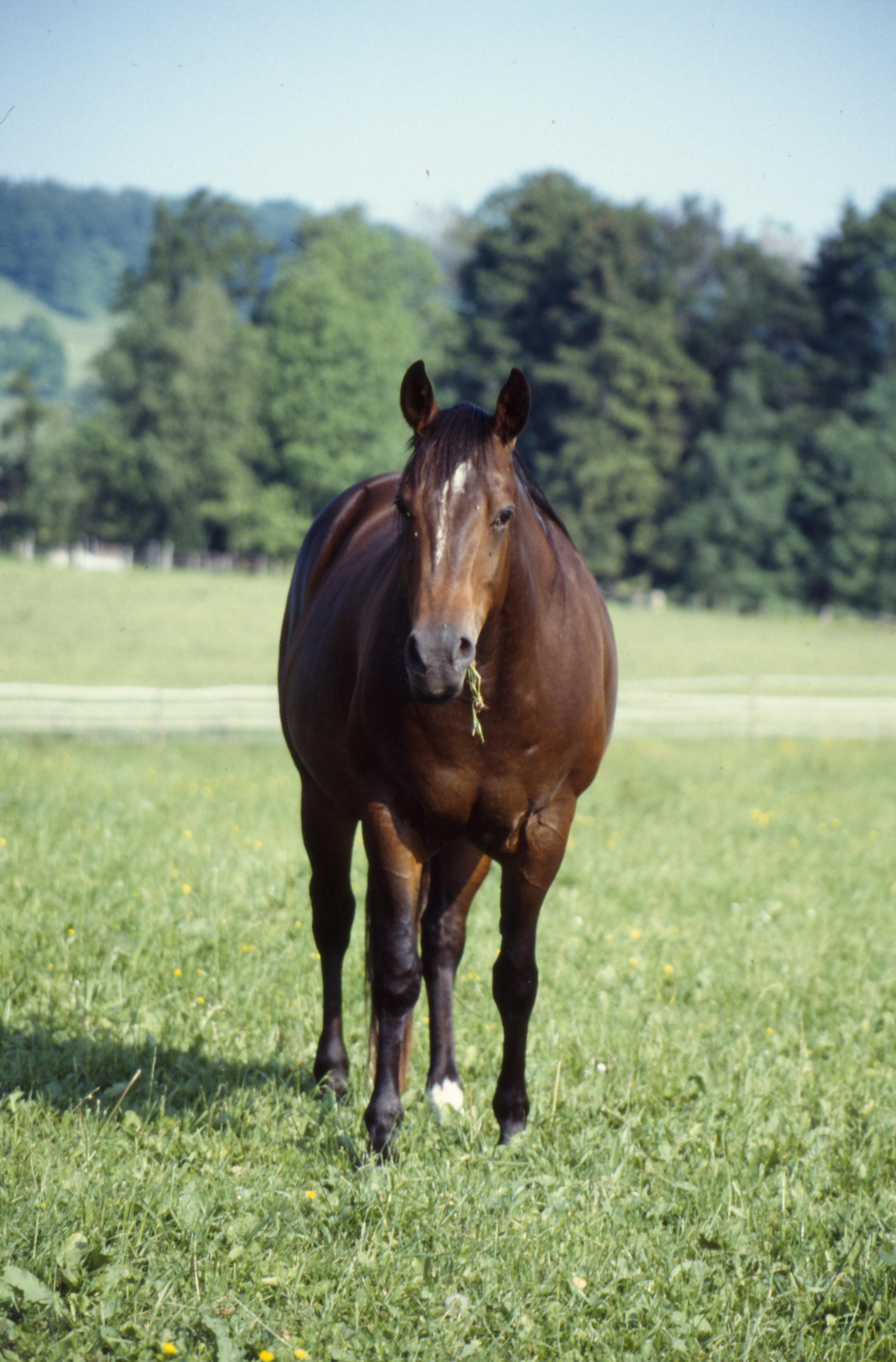
A halter-type Quarter Horse

The Quarter Horse has a small, short, refined head with a straight profile, and a strong, well-muscled body, featuring a broad chest and powerful, rounded hindquarters. They usually stand between 14 and 16 hands (56 and 64 inches, 142 and 163 cm) high, although some Halter-type and English hunter-type horses may grow as tall as 17 hands (68 inches, 173 cm).

There are two main body types: the stock type and the hunter or racing type. The stock horse type is shorter, more compact, stocky and well-muscled, yet agile. The racing and hunter type Quarter Horses are somewhat taller and smoother muscled than the stock type, more closely resembling the Thoroughbred.

Quarter Horses come in nearly all colors. The most common color is sorrel, a brownish red, part of the color group called chestnut by most other breed registries. Other recognized colors include bay, black, brown, buckskin, palomino, gray, dun, red dun, grullo (also occasionally referred to as blue dun), red roan, blue roan, bay roan, perlino, cremello, and white. In the past, spotted color patterns were excluded, but now with the advent of DNA testing to verify parentage, the registry accepts all colors as long as both parents are registered.

=== Stock type ===
A stock horse is a horse of a type that is well suited for working with livestock, particularly cattle. Reining and cutting horses are smaller in stature, with quick, agile movements and very powerful hindquarters. Western pleasure show horses are often slightly taller, with slower movements, smoother gaits, and a somewhat more level topline – though still featuring the powerful hindquarters characteristic of the Quarter Horse.

=== Halter type ===
Horses shown in-hand in Halter competition are larger yet, with a very heavily muscled appearance, while retaining small heads with wide jowls and refined muzzles. There is controversy amongst owners, breeder and veterinarians regarding the health effects of the extreme muscle mass that is currently fashionable in the specialized halter horse, which typically is 15.2 to 16 hands (62 to 64 inches, 157 to 163 cm) and weighs in at over 1,200 pounds (540 kg) when fitted for halter competition. Not only are there concerns about the weight to frame ratio on the horse's skeletal system, but the massive build is also linked to hyperkalemic periodic paralysis (HYPP) in descendants of the stallion Impressive (see Genetic diseases below).

=== Racing and hunter type ===
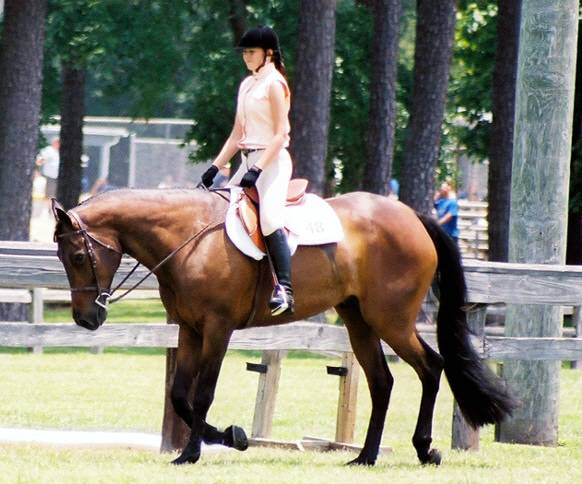
A Quarter Horse warming up for hunt seat competition

Quarter Horse race horses are bred to sprint short distances ranging from 220 to 870 yards. Thus, they have long legs and are leaner than their stock type counterparts, but are still characterized by muscular hindquarters and powerful legs. Quarter Horses race primarily against other Quarter Horses, and their sprinting ability has earned them the nickname, "the world's fastest athlete." The show hunter type is slimmer, even more closely resembling a Thoroughbred, usually reflecting a higher percentage of appendix breeding. They are shown in hunter/jumper classes at both breed shows and in open USEF-rated horse show competition.

== Genetic diseases ==
Several genetic diseases are of concern to Quarter Horse breeders. Most can now be identified by DNA testing so that breeders do not inadvertently produce foals with these conditions:

- Hyperkalemic periodic paralysis (HYPP), which is caused by an autosomal dominant gene originally linked to the stallion Impressive. It is characterized by uncontrollable muscle twitching and substantial muscle weakness or paralysis. Because it is a dominant gene, only one parent has to have the gene for it to be transmitted to offspring. There is a DNA test for HYPP, which is required by the AQHA. Since 2007, the AQHA has barred registration of horses that possess the homozygous form (H/H) of the gene, and though heterozygous (H/N) horses are still eligible for registration, altering that status is periodically discussed. Additionally, all Quarter Horses born in 2007 or later that are confirmed to be descendants of Impressive must carry a note about the risks of HYPP on their registration papers. Due to HYPP, there have been some rule changes for show competition, including the creation of a "Performance Halter class" in which a horse must possess a Register of Merit in performance or racing before it can compete.
- Myosin-heavy chain myopathy (MYHM) is a genetic muscle disease added to the AQHA genetic testing panel in 2022. It is a genetic dominant condition, though not all horses that inherit the gene will show clinical signs of being affected and the environmental triggers are not well understood at present. An estimated 7% of all Quarter Horses carry this gene. There are two forms, each linked to the same genetic variant. Affected horses may exhibit one or both forms of the condition. The first is Immune-Mediated Myositis (IMM). It may occur in response to a vaccination or infection, following which the immune system misinterprets the muscle cells as foreign and rapidly attacks them. Horses initially experience stiffness, weakness, and a decreased appetite followed by the rapid loss of 40% of muscle mass within 72 hours. The second form of MYHM is Nonexertional Rhabdomyolysis (compare to PSSM, below), which often presents as stiffness and possible swelling of muscles along the back and haunches without exercise. Clinical signs include pain, muscle cramping, and muscle damage, which may or may not result in muscle loss. When the condition is triggered, horses can recover but may have more frequent episodes. Horses that are homozygous (My/My) may have more severe symptoms.
- Malignant hyperthermia (MH) causes a horse's body to release uncontrolled amounts of calcium into the bloodstream when subjected to certain stressors, resulting in painful muscle cramps, extremely high temperature up to 113 degrees Fahrenheit, irregular heart rhythm, excessive sweating, and shallow breathing. It manifests when horses receive certain anesthesia drugs or in response to stressors such as overwork or excitement. Caused by a mutated allele, ryanodine receptor 1 gene (RyR1) at nucleotide C7360G, generating a R2454G amino acid substitution, it is inherited as an autosomal dominant. Horses that carry PSSM or MYHM along with MH have more severe episodes.
- Hereditary Equine Regional Dermal Asthenia (HERDA), also known as hyperelastosis cutis (HC). This is caused by an autosomal recessive gene, and thus produces affected offspring only when both parents transmit the gene, but may produce unaffected carriers if only one copy is transmitted. Horses affected by this disease have a collagen defect that results in the layers of skin not being held firmly together. Thus, when the horse is ridden under saddle or suffers trauma to the skin, the outer layer of the skin often splits or separates from the deeper layer, or can tear off completely. It rarely heals without disfiguring scars. Sunburn can also be a concern. In dramatic cases, the skin can split along the back and even roll down the sides, with the horse literally being skinned alive. Most horses with HERDA are euthanized for humane reasons between the age of two and four years. Researchers at Cornell University and Mississippi State University have theorized that the sire line of the foundation stallion Poco Bueno is linked to the disease. In 2007, researchers working independently at Cornell University and at the University of California, Davis announced that a DNA test for HERDA has been developed. Over 1,500 horses were tested during the development phase of the test, which is now available to the general public through both institutions. Approximately 3.5% of all Quarter Horses are carriers, as are as many as 28% of horses in cutting and related working cow horse disciplines.
- Glycogen Branching Enzyme Deficiency (GBED) is a recessive genetic disease in which the horse lacks an enzyme necessary for storing glycogen. In affected horses the heart and skeletal muscles cannot function, leading to rapid death. The disease manifests in foals who are homozygous for the lethal GBED allele, meaning both parents carry one copy of the gene. The stallion King P-234 has been linked to this disease. A DNA blood test is available. Roughly 10% of all Quarter Horses carry this gene.
- Equine polysaccharide storage myopathy, also called EPSM or PSSM, is a metabolic muscular condition in horses that causes tying up, and is also related to a glycogen storage disorder. There are two forms, PSSM-1 and PSSM-2. PSSM-1 is found in Quarter Horses and has a genetic test available. PSSM-2, which is primarily found in other breeds, has no genetic test available but can be diagnosed with a muscle biopsy. PSSM-1 has been traced to three specific but undisclosed bloodlines in Quarter Horses, with an autosomal recessive inheritance pattern. 11% of the Quarter Horse population carries PSSM, and 48% of Quarter Horses with symptoms of neuromuscular disease have PSSM. To some extent the disease can be diet controlled with specialized low-starch diets, but genetic testing is advised before breeding as the condition exists at a subclinical level in approximately 6% of the general Quarter Horse population.
- Lethal White Syndrome (LWS) is fatal when homozygous. Affected foals are born pure white in color with an underdeveloped intestinal tract that prevents them from defecating, thus dying within days if not euthanized first. Although "cropout" Quarter Horses with pinto markings were not allowed to be registered for many years because white markings were thought to be a result of undesirable crossbreeding, the gene that causes the condition also creates the frame overo color pattern when heterozygous, and the color pattern was not always visibly expressed. Thus, the condition has continued to appear periodically in Quarter Horse foals. There is a DNA test for this condition, and in part because DNA testing can verify parentage and because the genetic mechanism of LWS is now understood, AQHA has repealed its cropout rules, allowing horses with white patterns to be registered.
- Cleft Palate: a birth defect linked to multiple causative factors including genetics, hormones, mineral deficiency, tranquilizers, and steroids. Cleft palates are extremely uncommon, but as most of the research done on the condition has utilized Quarter Horses, the defect is linked to the breed. The surgery to repair a cleft palate has about a 20% success rate. Clinical signs include: lifting head high when eating, dropping head low to drink, coughing when beginning of exercise, and taking an extremely long time to fully administer oral medications placed in the side of the jaw.

== See also ==
- Quarab
- Quarter pony

== Sources ==
- American Quarter Horse Association (1961). Official Stud Book and Registry Combined Books 1-2-3-4-5. Amarillo, TX: American Quarter Horse Association.
- Church, Stephanie L. (2006-09-14). "ACVIM 2006: Prevalence of PSSM in Quarter Horses". The Horse Online News (# 7628). Archived from the original on 6 June 2008.
- Close, Pat (1994). Legends 2: Outstanding Quarter Horse Stallions and Mares. Colorado Springs: Western Horseman. ISBN 978-0-911647-30-3.
- Denhardt, Robert M. (1979). The Quarter Running Horse: America's Oldest Breed. Norman, OK: University of Oklahoma Press. ISBN 978-0-8061-1500-9.
- Mackay-Smith, Alexander (1983). The Colonial Quarter Race Horse. Richmond, VA: Whittet & Shepperson.
- Sellnow, Les (2007-05-28). "HERDA: DNA Tests Available for Disfiguring Skin Disease". The Horse Online News.
- Valberg SJ, Mickelson JR, Gallant EM, MacLeay JM, Lentz L, de la Corte F (July 1999). "Exertional rhabdomyolysis in quarter horses and thoroughbreds: one syndrome, multiple aetiologies". Equine Vet J Suppl. 30 (30): 533–8. doi:10.1111/j.2042-3306.1999.tb05279.x. PMID 10659313.
- Wiggins, Walt (1978). The Great American Speedhorse: A Guide to Quarter Racing. New York: Sovereign Books. ISBN 978-0-671-18340-0.
