= List of cowboy halls of fame =

Hall of Fame

This list of cowboy halls of fame encompasses cowboy and western halls of fame defined for this context as institutions (including nonprofit organizations, government entities, and private businesses). Museums that exist only in cyberspace (i.e., virtual museums) are also included. To use the sortable table, click on the icons at the top of each column to sort that column in alphabetical order; click again for reverse alphabetical order.

== Halls of fame ==
Name	City	County	State/ Province	Established	Summary	Ref
All Cowboy & Arena Champions Hall of Fame				2016	The All Cowboys & Arena Champions Hall of Fame is an internet-based hall of fame for the purpose of recognizing top individuals in the rodeo and arena-related world who were top hands but, for whatever reason, chose to compete only at state or regional basis. All Cowboy & Arena Champions Hall of Fame inductees	
American Quarter Horse Hall of Fame	Amarillo	Potter County	Texas	1982	The American Quarter Horse Hall of Fame was created by the American Quarter Horse Association (AQHA). It inducts both people and horses. Inductees are those who have contributed to the quarter industry in an exceptionally meaningful way. AQHA Hall of Fame inductees	
Bull Riding Hall of Fame	Fort Worth	Tarrant County	Texas	2012	The Bull Riding Hall of Fame, located at the Cowtown Coliseum in the Fort Worth Stockyards in Fort Worth, Texas, is a hall of fame for the sport of bull riding. Bull Riding Hall of Fame inductees	
California Rodeo Salinas Hall of Fame	Salinas	Monterey County	California	2010	A cowboy hall of fame in Salinas, California, that honors individuals who helped establish the rodeo as well as rodeo competitors. Hall of Fame Members by Category	
Canadian Pro Rodeo Hall of Fame	Ponoka	Ponoka County	Alberta	1979	The Canadian Pro Rodeo Hall of Fame honors contestants and others involved in rodeo for outstanding performance and contribution to rodeo. It also recognizes the performances of outstanding livestock contestants. It also collects and displays historic artifacts. Canadian Pro Rodeo Hall of Fame inductees	
Cheyenne Frontier Days Old West Museum	Cheyenne	Laramie County	Wyoming	1978	The museum also has a hall of fame exhibit for the rodeo. The rodeo dates back to 1897. Cheyenne Frontier Days Hall of Fame inductees	
Cowboy Keeper Hall of Fame	Gresham	Multnomah County	Oregon	2006	The Cowboy Keeper Hall of Fame awards the Cowboy Keeper Award. The foundation that runs this award is the National Day of the Cowboy organization.	
Dublin Rodeo Heritage Museum	Dublin	Erath County	Texas	2004	This museum covers the days when the Dublin Rodeo hosted one of the largest events during the 1930s through 1950s.	
Ellensburg Rodeo Hall of Fame	Ellensburg	Kittitas County	Washington	1997	This is a cowboy hall of fame. Each inductee has a biography in a file. The hall of fame also collects memorabilia. Inductees	
Hall of Great Westerners	Oklahoma City	Oklahoma County	Oklahoma	1955	The Hall of Great Westerners is one of the halls of the National Cowboy & Western Heritage Museum in Oklahoma City, Oklahoma. Its focus is to honor the great men and women of the American West. Hall of Great Westerners	
Hall of Great Western Performers	Oklahoma City	Oklahoma County	Oklahoma	1955	The Hall of Great Western Performers is one of the halls of fame of the National Cowboy & Western Heritage Museum in Oklahoma City, Oklahoma. It is dedicated to honoring those who have contributed to the making of Western television and films throughout the centuries. Great Western Performers	
Idaho Rodeo Hall of Fame	Gooding	Gooding County	Idaho	2013	The hall of fame is a non-profit organization that exists to preserve the Western way. Its focus is individuals in rodeo who use their sport to assist ranching and farming. Inductees	
Indian National Finals Rodeo Hall of Fame	Browning	Glacier County	Montana	1976	The hall of fame was created to preserve Indian rodeo throughout whatever areas it can access.	
Kansas Cowboy Hall of Fame	Dodge City	Ford County	Kansas	2002	This hall of fame resides at the Boot Hill Museum. The first inductees were selected in 2002.	
Lordsburg Hidalgo County Museum	Lordsburg	Hidalgo County	New Mexico		This museum has a very small presence in Lordsburg, New Mexico. The features an exhibition room for World War II. It also features a hall of fame room for Hidalgo County Growers Association.	
Michigan Quarter Horse Association Hall of Fame	Rockford	Kent County	Michigan	1980s	A hall of fame that recognizes individuals and horses who have impacted the association and the breed. Past inductees	
Montana Cowboy Hall of Fame	Great Falls	Cascade County	Montana	2003	The Montana Hall of Fame exists to preserve and bequeath the Montana cowboy way of life and other heritage. Inductees	
National Cowboy & Western Heritage Museum	Oklahoma City	Oklahoma County	Oklahoma	1955	The National Cowboy and Western Heritage Museum has three halls of fame and many more awards. It also has many exhibits at all times. The National Rodeo Hall of Fame, Hall of Great Westerners, and the Hall of Great Western Performers are the well known halls of fame.	
National Cowgirl Museum and Hall of Fame	Fort Worth	Tarrant County	Texas	1975	This hall of fame was established to honor women of the American West. It includes exhibits, a research library, and more. It also includes a hall of fame. All honorees	
National Multicultural Western Heritage Museum	Fort Worth	Tarrant County	Texas	2001	This museum was founded to recognize the contributions of many groups from the Western Frontier. Groups include Hispanic, Native American, European, Asian, and African descent. Inductees.	
National Reined Cow Horse Association Hall of Fame	Pilot Point	Denton County	Texas	1949	The National Reined Cow Horse Association (NRCHA) created the National Reined Cow Horse Association Hall of Fame to recognize extraordinary individuals in the equestrian sport of working cow horse.	
National Reining Horse Association Hall of Fame	Oklahoma City	Oklahoma County	Oklahoma	1986	This National Reining Horse Association Hall of Fame (NRHA) was created by the National Reining Horse Association (NRHA) for the Hall of Fame to recognize extraordinary athletes in the sport of reining.	
National Rodeo Hall of Fame	Oklahoma City	Oklahoma County	Oklahoma	1955	The National Rodeo Hall of Fame is one of the halls of fame of the National Cowboy & Western Heritage Museum in Oklahoma City, Oklahoma. The hall pays tribute to rodeo's greatest performers who are responsible for making the way for today's rodeo champions. National Rodeo Hall of Fame inductees	
National Snaffle Bit Association Hall of Fame	Gurnee	Lake County	Illinois	1983	This National Snaffle Bit Association Hall of Fame (NASB) was created by the National Snaffle Bit Association (NSBA) for the NSBA Hall of Fame to recognize individuals in the equestrian sport of pleasure riding. List of inductees.	
North Dakota Cowboy Hall of Fame	Medora	Billings County	North Dakota	1995	This hall of fame seeks to preserve the state's historic and modern lifestyle. Inductees	
Oahu Cattlemen's Association Paniolo Hall of Fame	Oahu	Honolulu County	Hawaii	1999	The Paniolo Hall of Fame recognizes individuals "for their contribution to the paniolo heritage and for perpetuating the industry".	
Pendleton Round-Up and Happy Canyon Hall of Fame	Pendleton	Umatilla County	Oregon	1969	The Pendleton Round-Up and Happy Canyon Hall of Fame is a hall of fame located in Pendleton, Oregon, United States. It was the first hall of fame started by an individual show, the Pendleton Round-Up. Exhibits focus on show memorabilia, and cowboy artifacts, and tens of other types of items.	
Professional Bull Riders: Heroes and Legends	Oklahoma City	Oklahoma County	Oklahoma	1996	The PBR Heroes and Legends honors many different participants in rough stock rodeo, but its main focus is bull riding. Awardees.	
ProRodeo Hall of Fame	Colorado Springs	El Paso County	Colorado	1979	This museum educates the public about rodeo, its impact on Western America culture. It also recognizes rodeo notables. Inductees	
Rex Allen Arizona Cowboy Museum and Willcox Cowboy Hall of Fame	Willcox	Cochise County	Arizona	1989	This museum and hall of fame is named for cowboy Rex Elvie Allen. It includes many types of memorabilia. The hall of fame has inductees from 1983 through the present. Willcox Cowboy Hall of Fame Inductees	
St. Paul Rodeo Hall of Fame	St. Paul	Marion County	Oregon	1998	This rodeo hall of fame was created by the St. Paul Rodeo Association. The rodeo has a long history. The inductees include many types of participants of both human and livestock. Inductees	
Texas Cowboy Hall of Fame	Fort Worth	Tarrant County	Texas	1997	Today, the Texas Cowboy Hall of Fame honors individuals from rodeo and the western world who have made significant contributions in their fields. Texas Cowboy Hall of Fame inductees	
Texas Rodeo Cowboy Hall of Fame	Fort Worth	Tarrant County	Texas	1975	The Texas Rodeo Cowboy Hall of Fame is a museum and hall of fame dedicated to rodeo in the Cowtown Coliseum in the historic Fort Worth Stockyards. Inductees	
Texas Rodeo Hall of Fame	Pecos	Reeves County	Texas	2004	The Texas Rodeo Hall of Fame has inducted individuals in all areas of rodeo, locally in the Pecos area, but all across the country as well. Hall of Fame members	
Texas Trail of Fame	Fort Worth	Tarrant County	Texas	1997	The Texas Trail of Fame honors individuals and livestock who have contributed to the Western lifestyle. The hall of fame is located in the historic Fort Worth Stockyards in the Fort Worth Stockyards Historic District. On the walkways throughout, bronze inlaid markers are placed for each. Inductees by Year	
Utah Cowboy and Western Heritage Museum	Ogden	Weber County	Utah	2012	The Utah Cowboy and Western Heritage Museum is a state-recognized museum which deals in artifacts of the American frontier. It also contains the Utah Cowbow Hall of Fame.	
Western Heritage Museum and Lea County Cowboy Hall of Fame	Hobbs	Lea County	New Mexico	1978	The Cowboy Hall of Fame inducts up to four individuals annually. Individuals must have roots in the county. Individuals are exceptional in either rodeo or ranching. Lea County Cowboy Hall of Fame inductees	
Wyoming Cowboy Hall of Fame	Casper	Douglas County	Wyoming	2013	The Wyoming Cowboy Hall of Fame exists to enrich Wyoming's cowboy and ranch heritage. Hall of Fame inductees	
