= National Reining Horse Association Hall of Fame =

Equestrian organization

- Established: 1986
- Location: Oklahoma City, OK
- Type: Hall of fame
- Website: NRHA

This National Reining Horse Association Hall of Fame was created by the National Reining Horse Association (NRHA) for the Hall of Fame to recognize extraordinary athletes, both human and equine, in the sport of Reining. It was founded in 1986 to honor and distinguish these individuals. Since the inception of the organization, both people and equine have contributed to its growth. The NRHA considers all of these individuals contributions exceptional to this sport. The Reining Horse Foundation instituted this hall of fame to continually acknowledge these individuals, and their display is a permanent exhibit which can be visited at the NHRA headquarters in Oklahoma City, Oklahoma.

- Awarded in a previous year

== Inductees ==
=== Equine inductees ===
Inductee Year	Inductee Name	AQHA Reference
1986	No inductees	
1987	No inductees	
1988	Continental King	
1989	Joe Cody	
1990	Enterprise Lady	
1990	Glenda Echols	
1991	High Proof	
1992	Hollywood Smoke	
1992	Banker Bar Leo	
1993	Mr Doin Good	
1994	No inductees	
1995	Cee Blair Sailor	
1995	Great Pine	
1996	Diamonds Sparkle	
1996	Topsail Cody	
1996	Trashadeous	
1997	Be Aech Enterprise	
1997	Jodieann	
1998	Great Simon Sez	
1998	Mr Feelin Good	
1999	No inductees	
2000	Hollywood Dun It	
2001	No inductees	
2002	Miss Cee Blair	
2003	Dodsons Little Star	
2004	Smart Chic Olena	
2008	Mr Gun Smoke	
2008	Taris Little Vintage	
2008	Miss Okie Too	
2009	Custom Chrome	
2009	Mega Ditto	
2010	Rest Stop	
2010	Nu Chex To Cash	
2011	Boomernic	
2011	Collena Chic Olena	
2011	Shining Spark	
2011	Wimpys Little Step	
2012	Wimpys Little Chic	
2013	No inductees	
2014	No inductees	
2015	Miss Tinseltown	
2016	Princess in Diamonds	
2016	Ebony Shines	
2016	Magnum Chic Dream	
2017	Smart Like Juice	
2018	Dun It For Chex	
2019	Wimpy Chic	

=== People inductees ===
Inductee Year	Inductee Name
1986	Dale Wilkinson
1987	No inductees
1988	R. D. Baker
1988	Stretch Bradley
1988	Mickie Glenn
1988	Paul Horn
1988	Bill Garvey
1989	C. T. Fuller
1989	Kaye Potts
1990	Paul Schuh
1990	Guy Gauthier
1991	No inductees
1992	Jim Willoughby
1992	Bob Loomis
1992	Bill Horn
1992	Bob Anthony
1993	Dick Pieper
1994	Clark Bradley
1994	John Snobelen
1995	No inductees
1996	No inductees
1997	No inductees
1998	No inductees
1999	No inductees
2000	Richie Greenberg
2000	Tim McQuay
2000	Tim Bartlett
2001	Frank Costantini
2002	No inductees
2003	Linda Matthews
2004	Fleuterio Arcese
2004	Pat Feuerstein
2004	Charles Smith
2004	Dick & Barb Waltenberry
2005	Clint Haverty
2006	Doug Mihholland
2006	Rocky Dare
2007	Keith Bradley
2008	American Quarter Horse Association
2008	Dr. Jim Morgan, DVM
2009	Roger Brazeau
2009	Mike Flarida
2010	Jack Brainard
2011	John Hoyt
2012	Shawn Flarida
2012	Bob Kiser
2012	Mandy McCutcheon
2012	Ronnie Sharpe
2013	Rick Weaver
2013	Carol Trimmer
2014	Colleen McQuay
2015	Gabriel Diano
2016	Don Motsenbocker
2017	Carol Rose
2017	Rosanne Sternberg
2018	Bill Bradley
2018	Vaughn Zimmerman*
2019	Roberto Cuoghi
2019	Claudio Risso

== NRHA Dale Wilkinson Lifetime Achievement Award ==
Award Year	Awardee Name
2008	Sally Brown
2009	Don Burt
2009	Don Hotz
2010	CR Morrison
2012	Tracy Lynch
2014	Jerry Kimmel
2014	Pat Warren
2015	Ken Eppers
2015	Bob Stinner
2016	Sharon Barr
2016	Mehl Lawson
2017	Tim Katona
2018	Lyle Lovett*
2018	William Shatner
2019	David Silva

== Million dollar earners ==
=== Million dollar riders ===
2019 Dean Brown 2022 Gabriel

=== Million dollar dams ===
2019 Dun It For Chex

=== Million dollar sires ===
- 2019 Cromed Out Mercedes
- 2019 Spat Olena
- 2019 Big Chex To Cash

=== Two million dollar sires ===
- 2019 Hollywoodstinseltown
- 2019 Spooks Gotta Whiz

=== Three million dollar sires ===
2019 Gunners Special Nite

=== Four million dollar sires ===
2019 Smart Like Juice

=== Six million dollar sires ===
- 2019 Magnum Chic Dream
- 2019 Smart Spook

=== Seven million dollar sires ===
Smart Chick Olena

=== Eleven million dollar sires ===
- 2019 Gunner
- 2019 Wimpys Little Step

== See also ==
- Campdrafting
- Cutting (sport)
- Horse show
- National Reining Horse Association
- National Reined Cow Horse Association
- National Reined Cow Horse Association Champions
- National Reined Cow Horse Association Hall of Fame
- Ranch sorting
- Reining
- Stock horse
- Team penning
- Western riding
- Western saddle
