= Shining Spark =

Quarter Horse show horse and sire

- Shining Spark
- Breed: American Quarter Horse
- Discipline: Reining
- Sire: Genuine Doc
- Grandsire: Doc Bar
- Dam: Diamonds Sparkle
- Maternal grandsire: Mr Diamond Dude
- Sex: Stallion
- Foaled: January 18, 1989
- Died: December 27, 2021 (aged 32)
- Country: United States
- Color: Palomino
- Breeder: Carol Rose
- Owner: Carol Rose

Other awards
- $10 Million Sire

Honors
- National Reining Horse Association Hall of Fame; National Reining Horse Association Four Million Dollar Sire

Shining Spark (January 18, 1989 – December 27, 2021) was an American reining Quarter horse. Shining Spark is in the National Reining Horse Association Hall of Fame (NHRA) Hall of Fame. He is a 2013 NHRA Four Million Dollar Sire. He is also a National Reined Cow Horse Association (NRHCA) Four Million Dollar Sire. He sired 1,316 foals after his quarter horse career.

== Early life ==
Shining Spark was born on January 18, 1989. He was bred by Carol Rose, who owned him his entire life. He was a Palomino Quarter Horse. He was sired by Genuine Doc and out of American Quarter Horse Hall of Fame (AQHA) mare Diamonds Sparkle. He became the anchor of Carol Rose's breeding program.

His sire, Genuine Doc, was the Senior Cutting Reserve World Champion. His dam, Diamonds Sparkle, is the 1979 AQHA Superhorse. His dam is also a member of the NRHA Hall of Fame. His sire Genuine Doc was bred, raised, and trained by those whom Rose picked as only the best. Genuine Doc is a leading sire of reining and cutting horses. Doc is an AQHA Superhorse sire. Doc has progeny bearing numerous AQHA and NHRA world champions.

== Career ==
By 1990, Rose was an experienced breeder and showman. She had learned by showing horses such as Gay Bars Gen, Zan Parr Bar, and Genuine Doc.Through these horses, she had earned world championships in the National Cutting Horse Association (NCHA) and AQHA venues. She was on a journey to become the No. 1 breeder. Rose already knew what it took to make a good performance horse. She wanted a horse with all the traits, including being a pretty horse but with athletic conformation, and a good mind.

When Shining Spark was a long yearling, Rose had her trainer, Jeff Petska, start him. It didn't take long for him to call Rose over to the pen to see how quickly he stopped at such a young age. He had a lot of stop in him too. Rose originally planned to make him a cutting horse. Bobby Lewis, also her trainer, suggested he might excel in reining events. They sent him to acclaimed horse trainer Bob Lewis. Lewis took sixth place at the 1992 NRH Futurity, from among 408 entries. Shining Spark was an open reserve champion at the Lazy E Classic the next year. Following those events, Rose wanted to show the stallion herself. She inquired of Tim and Colleen McQuay if they would assist her with him.

Trainer Tim McQuay led Shining Spark to win the 1993 AQHA junior reining world champion with a score of 227.5. He beat out another horse who scored 225. It was an important win for Rose. Then, in 1994, they won the National Reining Horse Association Derby. He was marked a score of 230.5. to win his NRHA Derby title. He earned $16,000 in his showing career, a significant amount in that time period.

Shining Spark reached leading sire status for the first time in 2003. He kept that status until September 2021. He was the first sire to reach Three Million Sire Status in the NRCHA. He is the Number One Maternal Grandsire of Cow Horse Money Earners per Equi-Stat records.

== Progeny ==
Shining Spark's progeny eclipse both reining and reined cow competition. They also overshadow the competition in roping events. In 2005, his progeny won four World Championships. He has sired more than 1,300 (1,316) foals. He has earned more than ten million dollars. In 2002, he was the youngest stallon to secure the NRHA million dollar sire title. He is the first all-time leading sire for the National Reined Cow Horse Association (NRHCA). High earners in AQHA shows include Bald N Shiney, Shining Smokin Spark, and Shiners Diamond Jill.

He was also a broodmare sire. Foals from his daughters earned over $24.1 million. His highest money-earning progeny in the NRCHA is Smart Shinetta. She is a 2002 mare sired by Docs Hickory and out of Smart Hickory. She has $128,169.92 in the books. A granddaughter in reining, Shiners Chic has $315,876. Another granddaughter that was a top money earner and decorated bridle horse was CD Dee Vee Dee.

== Awards ==
- Earnings top spot current $4,192,214.26
- Progeny cow horse earnings $4,536,790
- 1993 - AQHA Junior Reining World Championship
- 1994 - NHRA Open Derby World Championship
- 2002 - One Million Dollar Sire NRHA
- 2003 - Two Million Dollar Sire NRHA
- 2004 - One Million Dollar Sire NRCHA
- 2006 - Two Million Dollar Sire NRCHA
- 2008 - Three Million Dollar Sire NRHA
- 2013 - Four Million Dollar Sire NRHA
- Three Million Dollar Sire NRCHA
- Four Million Dollar Sire NRCHA

== Honors ==
- 2013 National Reining Horse Association (NRHA) Four Million Dollar Sire.
- 2011 National Reining Horse Association Hall of Fame
- National Reined Cow Horse Association (NRCHA) Four Million Dollar Sire

== Death and legacy ==
Shining Spark and Carol Rose were living in Gainesville, Texas, at the end of his life. Rose had Shining Spark euthanized when he was 33 years old on December 27, 2021. He had many illnesses caused by his old age.

He made his biggest mark by siring 1,316 registered American Quarter Horses from 26 crops. His progeny earned 37,546 AQHA points. They have also earned more than $10 million in performance earnings. Some top performers he sired are NRHA Open Futurity Champion Shining N Sassy with $259,262. Also, AQHA Superhorse Shine by the Bay with $178,699. And also world champion A Shiner Named Sioux with $161,891.

== Pedigree ==
Lightning Bar
Doc Bar
Dandy Doll
Genuine Doc
Gay Bar King
Gay Bars Gen
Princess Piper
Shining Spark
Blondy's Dude
Mr Diamond Dude
Miss Patsy Blake
Diamonds Sparkle
Clabber Question
Pollyanna Rose
Irene Vee
