= Carol Rose (horse breeder) =

American horsewoman and horse breeder

Carol Rose (born 1941) is a champion horsewoman. She is a world-class show woman and breeder. She became a leader during a time when men dominated the field.

== Life ==
Carol Rose was born Carol Alison Ramsey in 1941 in Palo Alto, California. Rose was still a child when she started competing in equestrian events. Her mother taught her to ride and take care of horses. From age 6, she was involved in working cow horse classes and competition In 1966, Rose moved to Gainesville, Texas, and 2 years later married horseman and future hall of fame inductee Matlock Rose.

== Career ==
By 1976, the Roses had bred or acquired many Quarter Horses who became American Quarter Horse Association (AQHA) show horses, hall of famers, and important sires.

They were showing cutting horses around the country. In 1975, they got the opportunity to stand American Quarter Horse Hall of Fame inductee Peppy San on their Gainesville, Texas, ranch. Later that year Carol's mother gifted her a stallion named Peponita. They also acquired Zan Parr Bar and Genuine Doc. By this time they were well established in breeding. After their divorce in June 1984, Rose retained Zan Parr Bar and Genuine Doc. In 1986 Rose bought Diamonds Sparkle. Diamonds Sparkle joined the American Quarter Horse Hall of Fame in 2007 and the National Reining Horse Association Hall of Fame in 1996. She foaled the stallion Shining Spark, who became noted in reining, by becoming a $4 million sire and joining the NRHA Hall of Fame like his dam.

Rose became a champion in non-pro cutting competition. She is currently one of the leading breeders and exhibitors of quarters in the industry. Rose has judges' cards with many equestrian associations. For AQHA, she was a judge 14 years. In the NCHA, she has $124,003 in rider earnings. In the NRHA, she has owner earnings. In the NRHA, she has rider earnings of $76,900. In 2008, she bred the NRHA Open Futurity champion Shining N Sassy.

=== Honors ===
- NCHA Horse Hall of Fame Peponita owned by Matlock and Carol Rose
- 1976 NCHA Non-Pro Hall of Fame - Carol Rose
- 2001 National Cowgirl Museum and Hall of Fame
- 2004 Texas Cowboy Hall of Fame
- 2010 American Quarter Horse Hall of Fame
- 2017 National Reining Horse Association Hall of Fame
