= Hollywood Dun It =

American Quarter Horse stallion and sire

Hollywood Dun It (1983 – 2005) was an American Quarter Horse who excelled in reining and was a record-setting stallion. He was known for his charismatic demeanor and passing on his trait of a big stop and athletic turning style, both desirable characteristics of reining horses.

== Pedigree ==
Hollywood Dun It was dun-colored American Quarter Horse stallion foaled in 1983. He was euthanized on March 30, 2005 at the age of 22. He was sired by Hollywood Jac 86 and out of Blossom Berry.

Zantanon
King
Jabalina
Easter King
Cuate
Gocha H
Jane By Darity
Hollywood Jac 86
Gold Rush
Hollywood Gold
Triangle Lady 17
Miss Hollywood
Buggins
Miss Buggins 86
Joe Graham Mare
Hollywood Dun It
Blue Rock
John Berry
Lady Joe Tom
Dun Berry
Scooter Waggoner
Fishs Streak
Taffy Fish
Blossom Berry
Tres Bars
Mr Tres Bars
Jenny Jones
Regina Bella
Possum Belle
Tina Regina
Little Dunny 2

== Owners ==
Dun It was bred by Gwen L. Steif of Kildeer, Illinois. However, he was later purchased by Tim and Colleen McQuay of Tioga, Texas, and their business partner Jennifer Easton from Saint Mary's Point, Minnesota. Tim McQuay was a trainer who surpassed the $2,000,000 earnings mark in the National Reining Horse Association (NHRA).

== Career ==
Hollywood Dun It first major championship was in 1986 when then trainer Tim McQuay rode him to the NHRA Open Futurity Reserve Champion. In 1987 he was named the NRHA Open Derby Champion and the NRHA Open Superstakes Champion. In competition Dun It won $65,808 of NRHA winnings.

== Offspring/Breeding ==
Dun It was retired and used solely at stud beginning in 1988. Dun It was the first sire to produce foals with earnings at $3,000,000 and then $4,000,000. He became the second stallion to reach $6,000,000 after his death--$6,007,133 to be exact. Six of his offspring have won over $100,000 in NRHA Lifetime Earnings After his death in 2005, limited amounts of frozen semen remained available from McQuay Stables, and As of 2011, he was the recorded sire of 1,209 American Quarter Horses. Those seven horses are Hollywoodstinseltown, Reminic N Dunit, Hollywood Vintage, Matt Dillon Dun It, Hollywood, Hollywood Downtown, and BH Hollywood Lady. His foals have won many prestigious titles, including NRHA Futurity, NRHA Derby, NRHA Superstakes, All American Quarter Horse Congress Futurity, National Reining Breeders Classic, as well as gold medals in international competition. He has also produced horses that have performed well in other disciplines such as working cow horse, horse, and barrel racing.

== Hall of Fame ==
In 2000, Hollywood Dun It was inducted into the National Reining Horse Association Hall of Fame. In 2012, he was inducted into the American Quarter Horse Association Hall of Fame.

== Other information ==
When Hollywood Dun It died, he was suffering from severe health problems including testicular cancer. In his honor, there is now an NHRA award deemed "Hollywood Dun It."

In 1998, Hollywood Dun It became the first reining horse to be made into a Breyer Horse Creation. The response and sales were so good to the model that it became a collector's item and was taken off of the production line. In 2002, his son followed in his footsteps and Dun Gotta Gun was also made into a Breyer Horse.

== See also ==
- List of historical horses
