= Matlock Rose =

Cutting horse trainer. (1924-2008)

- Matlock Rose and Peppy San
- Birth name: Berry Matlock Rose
- Occupation: Horse trainer
- Discipline: NCHA cutting AQHA performance horses
- Born: August 12, 1924; Little Elm, Texas
- Died: January 5, 2008 (aged 83); Van, Texas
- Spouse(s): "Freddie" Bush Rose; Joy Fields Rose; Carol Ramsey Rose (married 1968–divorced 1984); LaVerne Johnson Rose
- Major wins/Championships: AQHA World Champion, 5 times NCHA World Champion
- Lifetime achievements: NCHA Rider Hall of Fame, NCHA Member Hall of Fame, AQHA Hall of Fame, Texas Cowboy Hall of Fame

Significant horses
- Peppy San, Pepponita, Jesse James, Stardust Desire, Christmas Four

Matlock Rose, born Berry Matlock Rose (1924–2008), was a professional horse trainer for over 60 years. He established a reputation as an all-around cowboy and trainer of champions. Rose was often described as stonefaced, a man of few words, but long held the respect of his peers. He was referred to as a trainers' trainer, and considered a legend. He trained multiple AQHA world champions, five NCHA world champions, was inducted into the American Quarter Horse Hall of Fame in 2001, as well as both the NCHA Rider Hall of Fame and the NCHA Members Hall of Fame. The first famous cutting horse he trained was Jesse James and many other great horses followed but he was best known for training Peppy San and Peponita.

== Early life ==
Matlock Rose was born and raised in North Texas near Hill Town, later known as Little Elm which is located approximately 15 mi (24 km) from Aubrey, Texas. He was the only son of five children born to Pauline and Sam Rose. Sam farmed oats, wheat, maize and corn, and also raised cattle. As a small boy, Matlock often rode double in the saddle with his father to check cattle. He grew up working on the family ranch under his father's guidance, which is where he learned horsemanship and developed his early skills as a trainer. He knew how to shoe horses, and train them in various disciplines but he was particularly fond of calf roping and cutting. He was also a good competitor as he demonstrated early on in high school playing catcher on a championship baseball team. After graduating, he served in the U.S. Navy during World War II.

== Early career ==
Matlock trained and showed many horses in various performance disciplines to earn their championships, including halter, reining, roping and cutting in AQHA horse show competition. He also competed successfully in NCHA cutting horse events.

After his service in the Navy, Matlock returned to ranch work and secured his first major job training Quarter Horses at 3D's Stock Farm for W.T. Waggoner from 1946 to 1948. At the time, Bob Burton was foreman of the horse division, and Pine Johnson, who trained and showed Poco Bueno, was their cutting horse trainer. His next job was at Lester Goodson's J3 Ranch in Magnolia, Texas. It was at J3 Ranch that he and Bubba Cascio worked together and became longtime friends.

Matlock left J3 Ranch and went to work for Ben Fussell who had purchased Jessie James. The pair were reunited and ended the year with an NCHA Reserve World Championship.

From 1953 to 1958, Matlock worked for B.F. Phillips at the Phillips Ranch, Frisco, Texas. He showed horses in AQHA halter and performance events, the latter of which including roping and cutting. In 1957, he showed Steel Bars at halter to earn the AQHA High Point Halter Stallion award. His next job was with Pinehurst Ranch for Edgar Brown III of Houston, Texas, until 1959 when he partnered with George Tyler, Gainesville, Texas. They advertised their horse business in the Quarter Horse Journal using the slogan, "Our horses are broke, and we are too." From 1960 to 1963, Matlock worked at the G.B. Howell Ranch in Seagoville, Texas, and "had great influence on both the cutting and Quarter Horse worlds." It was in 1962 at the NCHA Futurity that Matlock rode Peppy San to win Reserve Futurity Open Champion. In 1963, Howell dispersed his Quarter Horse business.

== Rose Ranch ==
In 1964, Matlock established the Matlock Rose Ranch located north of Gainesville, Texas. A year later, he purchased a cutting mare named Stardust Desire in partnership with his long time friend George Tyler. She eventually sold to the Douglas Lake Cattle Company, Ltd. owned by C.N. "Chunky" Woodward, a Canadian rancher and businessman. Matlock continued to show the mare for Woodward and in 1966, the pair won their first NCHA World Championship. In 1967, Matlock was reunited with Peppy San, the senior sire for Woodward's Douglas Lake Cattle Company. The pair won the 1967 NCHA World Championship.

== Personal life ==
Matlock's son, Sam, was the result of his previous marriage to "Freddie" Bush Rose (1927 - 2004), sister to Stanley Bush, NCHA Rider Hall of Fame (1989) and NCHA Members Hall of Fame Honoree (2003). His second marriage was to Joy Fields, and resulted in two daughters, Julie and Judy. His third marriage was to Carol Ramsey in 1968, and they resided on Matlock's training and Quarter Horse breeding facility in Gainesville, Texas, where they stood several world champion stallions, including Peppy San and Zan Parr Bar, both of whom were inducted into the AQHA Hall of Fame. Matlock and Carol hauled together on the show circuit competing in NCHA and AQHA sponsored events throughout the US. They divorced in 1984, and as part of the divorce settlement, Carol kept Zan Parr Bar and Genuine Doc, while Matlock took Peppy San and Peponita and relocated to Van, Texas. He later met and married LaVerne Johnson.

=== Major career wins ===
- 1951 NCHA Reserve World Champion riding Jesse James
- 1966 World Champion riding Stardust Desire
- 1967 NCHA World Champion and NCHA Tournament of Champions Champion riding Peppy San
- 1968 NCHA Top Ten and NCHA Tournament of Champions Champion riding Christmas Four
- 1969 NCHA Futurity Winner riding Cee Bars Joan
- 1970 NCHA Top Ten riding Moira Girl
- 1971 NCHA Top Ten riding Gay Bars Gen
- 1974 NCHA Derby Co-Champion riding Chucky's Monkey
- 1975 NCHA World Champion riding Peppy's Desire
- 1976 NCHA (twice) Top Ten riding Chunky's Monkey and Peponita
- 1978 AQHA World Champion Senior Cutting Horse riding Peponita
- 1979 NCHA World Champion and NCHA Finals Champion riding Peponita.
