= National Reining Horse Association =

Equestrian organization

- Sport: Reining
- Founded: 1966
- Countries: United States
- Most recent champion: (United States) What A Wave
- Website: NRHA

The National Reining Horse Association (NRHA) is an American nonprofit organization whose purpose is to promote the reining horse.

== History and mission ==
The NRHA was founded in 1966 in Coshocton, Ohio, and later moved its headquarters to Oklahoma City, Oklahoma.

The NRHA approves shows for all breeds of horses, and for all levels of riders from beginning amateurs to professional trainers. They also sponsor the NRHA Futurity for three-year-old horses.

The NRHA also sponsors the NRHA Derby, for horses ages 4–6 years old. These horses compete for more than $600,000 added in purse money. Held in late spring and early summer, this event takes place in Oklahoma City, Oklahoma. The NRHA Derby also hosts the Collegiate Reining Championships.

The NRHA's objective is to "promote and encourage development of and public interest in agriculture and ranching through the promotion of public Reining Horse Shows; the development of suitable and proper standards of performance and judging intended to govern all Reining Horse Contests sponsored and approved by the National Reining Horse Association; to encourage the development and breeding of better Reining Horses; and to develop and disseminate informational material deemed desirable to provide contestants and spectators a better understanding of a proper performance of the Reining Horse in the show arena."

== Reining ==
Reining is a western riding event that judges the athletic ability and willingness of the horse to perform patterns that each consist of certain maneuvers. To rein a horse is not only to guide him but to control his every movement, the best reined horse will guide with little or no apparent resistance and will be dedicated to completely.

== Hall of Fame ==
The NRHA Hall of Fame recognizes individuals who have been “exceptional in their individual accomplishments and exceptional in their contribution to the sport of Reining.” The selection procedure for inducting people into the NRHA Hall of Fame is based on criteria such as how long they have been involved in the organization, show record, and how they have influenced the NRHA. The selection procedure for inducting horses into the Hall of Fame is based on criteria such as show record, the show record of their offspring, and any additional awards they may have earned

== See also ==
- Campdrafting
- Cutting (sport)
- Horse show
- National Reining Horse Association Hall of Fame
- National Reined Cow Horse Association
- Ranch sorting
- Reining
- Stock horse
- Team penning
- Western riding
- Western saddle

== Sources ==
- National Reining Horse Association. 2007 Handbook: By-Laws, Rules, and Regulations Judges Guide. 2007.
- Strickland, Charlene (1998). Competing in Western Shows & Events. Pownal, VT: Storey Publishing. ISBN 1-58017-031-5.
