= Diamonds Sparkle =

Quarter Horse show mare and broodmare

- Breed: Quarter Horse
- Discipline: Reining; Roping; Halter; Western pleasure
- Sire: Mr Diamond Dude
- Grandsire: Blondy's Dude
- Dam: Pollyanna Rose
- Maternal grandsire: Clabber Question
- Sex: Mare
- Foaled: 1974
- Died: November 2002 (aged 28)
- Country: United States
- Color: Palomino
- Breeder: M. J. Sprouse and Jerald Freeman
- Owner: Carol Rose

Other awards
- AQHA Performance Register of Merit; AQHA Champion; 1979 AQHA World Show Superorse; 1979; AQHA World Champion Senior Heading; AQHA Superior Steer Roping

Honors
- National Reining Horse Association Hall of Fame; American Quarter Horse Hall of Fame

Diamonds Sparkle (born 1974) was an outstanding show horse and Quarter horse broodmare. She was inducted into the AQHA Hall of Fame.

== Background ==
Diamonds Sparkle was registered as number 1,004,317 with the American Quarter Horse Association (or AQHA). She was registered as a 1974 palomino mare, bred and owned by M. J. Sprouse and Jerald Freeman of Bixby, Oklahoma. Her sire was a son of Blondy's Dude out of a mare that traced to Wimpy P-1 and Oklahoma Star P-6. Diamonds Sparkle's dam was out of a mare that traced to Three Bars (TB), Bert, and Clabber.

== Competitive career ==
Diamonds Sparkle was the AQHA World Show Superhorse winner in 1979 as well as being the 1979 AQHA World Champion Senior Heading Horse. She earned 23 AQHA Halter Points, 39 AQHA Heeling Points, 22 AQHA Heading Points, 31 AQHA Western Pleasure Points, and 28 AQHA Reining Points. She also earned an AQHA Championship and an AQHA Superior Steer Roping Horse award.

== Breeding record ==
Diamonds Sparkle's offspring include Sparkles Rosezana, winner of the 1985 National Reining Horse Association (or NRHA) Futurity; Zans Diamond Sun, 1987 AQHA World Champion in Junior Reining; Sparkles Suzana, 1989 NRHA Derby Champion; Genuine Redskin, 1990 NRHA Derby Champion; Shining Spark, 1994 NRHA Derby Champion; and Spark O Lena, 1996 AQHA Reserve World Show Superhorse. Her son Shining Spark in 2005 reached the milestone of being the sire of foals that had earned over $2 million in NRHA competition. She died in November 2002. Sparkles Rosezana, Zans Diamond Sun and Sparkles Suzana were sired by fellow Hall of Fame member Zan Parr Bar.

== Honors ==
Diamonds Sparkle was inducted into the AQHA Hall of Fame in 2007. In 1996 she was inducted into the National Reining Horse Association Hall of Fame.

== Pedigree ==
King P-234
Small Town Dude
Uncle's Pet
Blondy's Dude
Blondy Plaudit
Blondy Queen
Johnnie Adair
Mr Diamond Dude
Wimpy II
Dawson's Glory
Brown Betty Dawson
Miss Patsy Blake
Shiloah
Dolly Raper
Pet Wisdom
Diamonds Sparkle
Three Bars (TB)
Clabber Bar
Peggy N
Clabber Question
Question Mark
Foolish Question
Foolish Wind
Pollyanna Rose
Sir Barton
Bert Barton
Rodeo Queen
Irene Vee
Smokey Moore
Smoky's Taffy
Miss Cayenne
