= Stock horse =

Type of horse

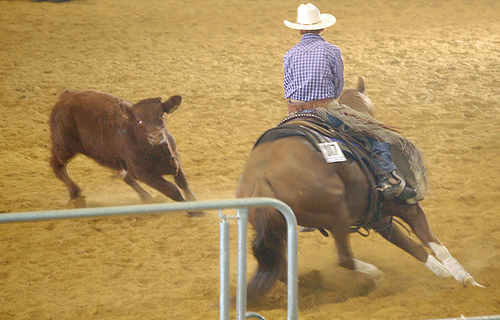
A cutting horse working a cow

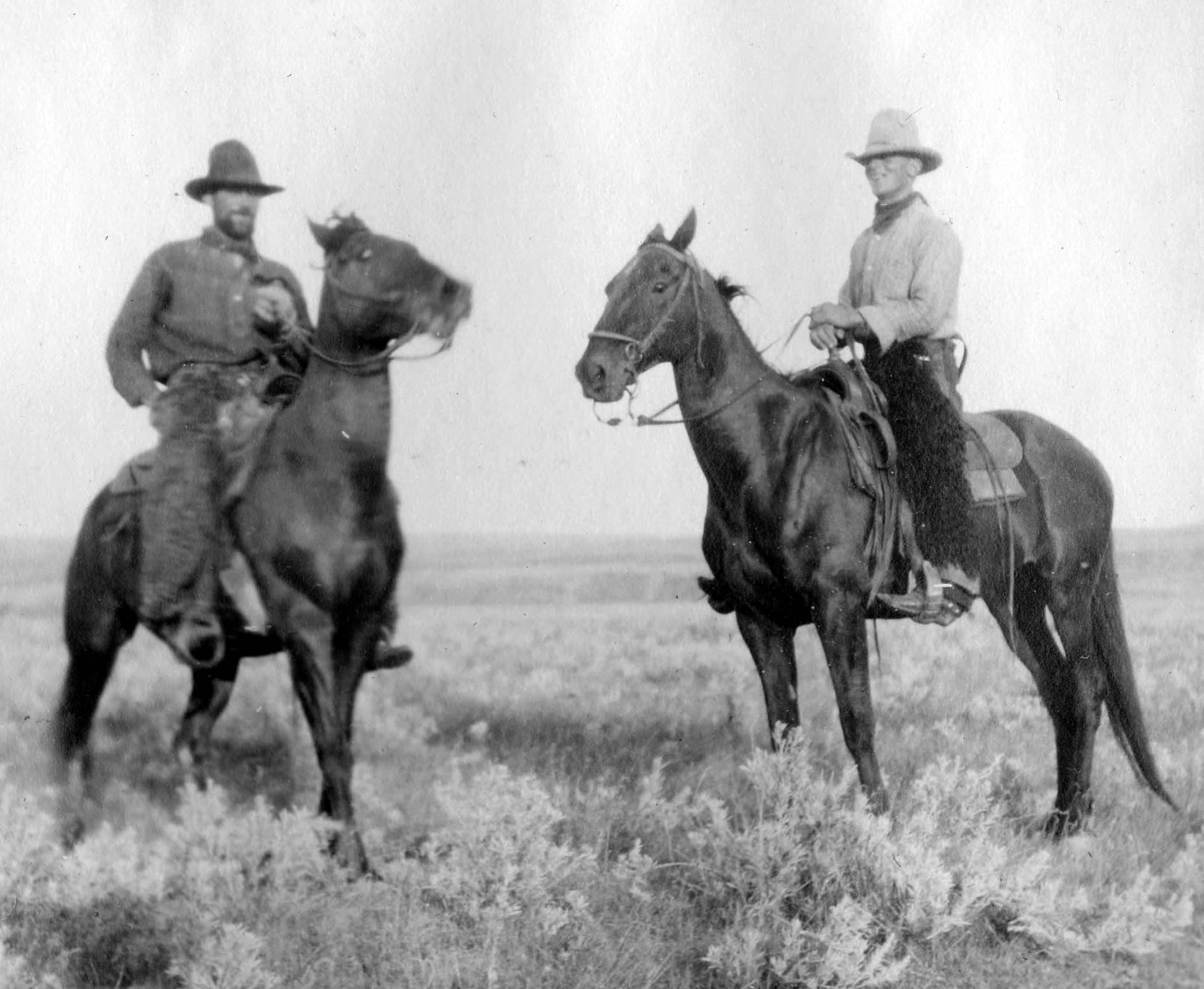
Montana cowboys and their horses, circa 1910

A stock horse is a horse of a type that is well suited for working with livestock, particularly cattle. The related cow pony or cow horse is a historic phrase, still used colloquially today, referring to a particularly small agile cattle-herding horse; the term dates to 1874. The word "pony" in this context has little to do with the animal's size, though the traditional cow pony could be as small as 700 to 900 pounds (320 to 410 kg) and less than 14 hands (56 inches, 142 cm) high.

Such horses are characterized by agility, quickness, and powerful hindquarters. They are usually noted for intelligence and "cow sense," having an instinctive understanding of how to respond to the movement of cattle so as to move livestock in a desired manner with minimal or no guidance from their rider. Such horses are used both as working animals on livestock ranches or stations, and are also seen in competition where horses are evaluated on their ability to work cattle.

The term may refer to any of the following:

- A horse used for ranch work or for competition based on the movements of a working ranch horse, including:
  - campdrafting
  - cutting
  - ranch sorting
  - reining
  - rodeo, particularly calf roping and team roping
  - team penning
  - working cow horse
  - An outdated term for reining or working cow horse competition.
- Any breed used for ranch or cattle work in the United States, or work on cattle stations in Australia, including:
  - Australian Stock Horse
  - American Quarter Horse
  - American Paint Horse
  - Appaloosa
  - Banker horse
  - Carolina Marsh Tacky
  - Florida Cracker Horse
- Any other horse used for western riding, ranch work or for stock horse types of competition.
- Any breed or type of light riding horse of a phenotype that includes a powerful build with heavily muscled hindquarters that appears suitable for work as a stock horse. This includes some representatives of a variety of breeds and crossbreeds, such as the cutting horse. Breeds with stock horse-type representatives include:
  - Arabian horse
  - Morab
  - Morgan horse
  - Mustang
  - Pony of the Americas
  - Quarab

== See also ==
- List of horse breeds
- Glossary of equestrian terms
- Cowboy
