= Blondy's Dude =

Quarter Horse stallion, showhorse, and sire

- Breed: Quarter Horse
- Discipline: Halter; Cutting; Reining
- Sire: Small Town Dude
- Grandsire: King P-234
- Dam: Blondy Queen
- Maternal grandsire: Blondy Plaudit
- Sex: Stallion
- Foaled: 1957
- Country: United States
- Color: Sorrel
- Breeder: Homer S. Foutz

Other awards
- AQHA Performance Register of Merit; AQHA Champion

Honors
- American Quarter Horse Hall of Fame

Blondy's Dude (1957–1981) was an influential Quarter Horse show horse and sire. He was posthumously inducted into the AQHA Hall of Fame.

== Background ==
Blondy's Dude was a 1957 sorrel stallion sired by Small Town Dude and out of Blondy Queen. His sire was a son of King P-234 and his dam was a descendant of Plaudit.

== Cutting and reining career ==
Blondy's Dude was an American Quarter Horse Association (or AQHA) Champion and a Performance Register of Merit earner. Morgan Freeman bought him in 1961, after seeing him at a reining competition as well as at an informal cutting. The horse earned 45 Halter points as well as four cutting and eight reining points with the AQHA. Morgan's son Jerald said that Blondy's Dude was very much a people horse, that he liked to follow people around.

== Stud record and honors ==
Among Blondy's Dude's famous offspring were Mighty Blonde, Small Town Babe, Dude's Ann, Okie Star Dude, Hy Fashion Blond, and Dude's Baby Doll. Among his famous grandget was Diamonds Sparkle. His offspring earned twenty-five AQHA Championships, along with Superior Performance horse awards and many Performance Register of Merits. Three of his foals earned year end High Point Awards with the AQHA, and one was a multiple times World Champion at the Youth World Show. His offspring excelled in many different disciplines, having earned Superior Performance awards in Western Pleasure, Reining, Barrel Racing, Hunter Under Saddle, Trail, Roping, and Pole Bending.

Blondy's Dude was inducted into the AQHA Hall of Fame in 2001. He died in 1981 and was buried in Morgan Freeman's front yard in the town of Skiatook, Oklahoma with a marker stating "God gives his best to those that leave the choice to him. Owned and Loved by Morgan Freeman."

== Pedigree ==
Little Joe
Zantanon
Jeanette
King P-234
Strait Horse
Jabalina
mare by Traveler
Small Town Dude
Little Joe
Zantanon
Jeanette
Uncle's Pet
Captain Joe
mare by Captain Joe
Benavides mare
Blondy's Dude
King Plaudit (TB)
Plaudit
Colorado Queen
Blondy Plaudit
Lani Chief (TB)
Lani Act
Flaxy Act
Blondy Queen
Yellow Jacket
Yellow Boy P-18
Bonnie Wilkens
Johnnie Adair
unknown
JA Ranch quarter mare
unknown
