= Sandy Collier =

American horse rider

Sandy Collier was inducted into the National Cowgirl Museum and Hall of Fame in 2011. Collier was named one of the "Top 50 Riders of All Time in All Disciplines” by Horse & Rider magazine.

== Life ==
Collier was born in Massachusetts. At age 6, Collier started showing horses in an English saddle. In 1972, at age 19, Collier was employed at the Tajiguas Ranch in Santa Barbara, California. She performed a wide variety of chores for the ranch. In 1980 she began her own business training. In 1992, two of her clients, David and Paula Hunsicker had her search for a snaffle bit prospect. At the Tejon Ranch, she met future NRCHA hall of famer Doug Williamson and found the horse. There was something about one mare that piqued her attention. Collier bought Miss Rey Dry and won the 1993 Snaffle Bit Futurity Open Championship. Collier is the only woman to win this race. She resides in Buellton, California.

== Career ==
Collier won the AQHA Jr. Cow Horse World Championship. She won the NRCHA Hackamore Classic Championship. She is the first woman winner of the NRCHA World Champion Snaffle Bit Futurity. In 2001, Collier won the Futurity Open Reserve Championship. In 2002, she won the AQHA Junior Working Cow Horse World Championship on Sheza Shinette. She won the NRCHA World Champion Snaffle Bit Futurity Reserve Co-Championship. She won the NRCHA Stallion Stakes Champion. She won the NRHA Limited Open Champion. She won the AQHA World Champion.

Collier is a AAA-rated NRCHA judge. She's also a member of the NRCHA Board of Directors. Collier is a clinician, the co-author of a book and some articles, and has published some DVDs, all on horsemanship.

=== Honors ===
- 2020 Art of the Cowgirl Master Horseman
- 2013 National Reined Cow Horse Association Hall of Fame
- Western Lifetime Achievement Award presented by Monty Roberts of Join-Up
