= Zan Parr Bar =

20th-century American Quarter Horse stallion

- Breed: Quarter Horse
- Discipline: Calf roping Halter
- Sire: Par Three
- Grandsire: Three Bars (TB)
- Dam: Terry's Pal
- Maternal grandsire: Poco Astro
- Sex: Stallion
- Foaled: 1974
- Died: November 25, 1987 (aged 13)
- Country: United States
- Color: Chestnut
- Breeder: Bobbie Silva
- Owner: Carol Rose; Bill Gibford

Other awards
- AQHA Performance Register of Merit; AQHA Champion; AQHA Superior Halter Horse; Superior Steer Roping Horse

Honors
- American Quarter Horse Hall of Fame

Zan Parr Bar (1974–1987) was an American Quarter Horse stallion who excelled at halter and at calf roping, as well as being a sire of show horses. A grandson of Three Bars, he was shown in halter as well as under saddle, or while ridden, in both regular riding classes and in roping events. He retired from showing in 1980 to become a breeding stallion, where he sired over 600 foals, with many show winners. He died in 1987 and was inducted into the American Quarter Horse Association's (AQHA) Hall of Fame in 2010.

== Early life ==
Zan Parr Bar was a chestnut stallion sired by Par Three, a son of AQHA Hall of Fame member Three Bars, a Thoroughbred stallion. His dam, or mother, was Terry's Pal, a daughter of Poco Astro. He was bred by Bobbie Silva of Tulare, California, and was foaled on April 30, 1974. At four months old he was bought by Bill Gibford, a professor at California Polytechnic State University, who named him Zan Parr Bar, with the Zan part of the name referring to the horse's distant ancestor Zantanon, and the Parr and Bar referring to Par Three and Three Bars. At maturity, he stood 15.3 hands (160 cm) high and weighed 1,250 pounds (570 kg).

== Beginning show career ==
Gibford showed Zan Parr Bar as a two-year-old in halter, earning some Grand Champion and Reserve Grand Championships. While at a show in California, Texas breeder Carol Rose saw Zan Parr Bar, and tried to purchase him from Gibford, who had been her advisor at California Polytechnic State University (Cal Poly), but Gibford would not sell, only compromising at allowing Rose the right of first refusal if he ever did sell the horse. A month later, Gibford called Rose, and informed her that he was in fact entertaining offers for the stallion, and she immediately flew to California and finalized the deal for the horse. As Rose put it, "I was on a plane at eight the next morning, there by three, and by 5:30, the deal was done. At six, someone else who'd made an offer showed up."

== Show career ==
Rose moved the stallion to Texas, and her then-husband Matlock Rose continued the horse's halter career. At the same time, Zan Parr Bar began showing western pleasure, earning 19 points in the discipline with the AQHA by the end of 1977, enough for a Performance Register of Merit. In 1978, the stallion began showing in steer roping, training with Billy Allen and earning a Superior Steer Roping horse title as well as an AQHA Champion title by the end of 1978.

During Zan Parr Bar's show career he earned an AQHA Champion, Performance Register of Merit, Superior Halter Horse and Superior Steer Roping Horse. He was the 1977 High Point Halter Stallion and World Champion Three-Year-Old Stallion. In 1979 he was the World Champion Aged Stallion in Halter as well as the High Point Steer Roping Horse. In 1980 he repeated as World Champion Aged Halter stallion. By the end of his showing career, in AQHA shows he had earned 245 points in halter, 278 points in steer roping, 38 points in western pleasure, 20 points in calf roping, and 13 points in reining.

== Breeding career ==
Zan Parr Bar retired from showing after 1980, becoming a full-time breeding stallion. He sired a number of World Champion horses, including Reprise Bar, Zan Parr Jack, and Zan Gold Jack. Crossed with fellow Hall of Fame member Diamonds Sparkle, Zan Parr Bar produced Sparkles Rosezana, Zans Diamond Sun and Sparkles Suzana. In total, he sired 652 foals out of 12 foal crops, with his foals earning 22 AQHA Champion honors, 31 World Champion titles, 6 Superior Halter titles, 204 Performance Register of Merits, and 143 Superior Performance honors in various disciplines. His foals earned almost 25,000 points in almost all the types of show ring classes offered by the AQHA. One of his foals, Reprise Bar, earned the AQHA Superhorse title at the 1984 AQHA World Show. Five of his offspring won all-around high point awards, earning the most points in a given year in a specific discipline in AQHA shows.

== Death and honors ==
Zan Parr Bar died of colitis X on November 25, 1987, and was buried at the Southwest Stallion Station in Elgin, Texas. He was inducted into the AQHA Hall of Fame in 2010.

== Pedigree ==
Percentage (TB)
Three Bars (TB)
Myrtle Dee (TB)
Par Three
Ed Echols
Annie Echols
Orphan Annie
Zan Parr Bar
Poco Danny
Poco Astro
Solo Mount
Terry's Pal
Semotan's Streak
Gold Raider
Dusty Dun
