= American Cutting Horse Association =

The American Cutting Horse Association (ACHA) is a membership association that was formed to promote the sport of cutting horse competition. The ACHA is headquartered in Brenham, Texas. They have developed rules of conduct for ACHA sponsored cutting events, sponsor an annual world championship competition, and also keep show records and maintain the lifetime earnings for horse and rider. Four affiliates comprise the ACHA, including the South West Texas Cutting Horse Association in Belton, Texas, the South Texas Cutting Horse Association in Brenham, Texas, the American Western Sports Cutting Horse Association in Sulpher Springs, Texas, and the American Oklahoma Cutting Horse Association in Corn, Oklahoma.
