= Lordsburg Hidalgo County Museum =

Coordinates: 32°20′51.2″N 108°42′5.6″W

The Lordsburg Hidalgo County Museum is located in Lordsburg, New Mexico. It features a World War II Internment and POW exhibit and a Hidalgo County Cattle Growers Association Hall of Fame Room. Other exhibits include mining, rocks and minerals, antique tools, area ranching heritage, bottles and railroads.
