= Campdrafting =

Sport involving a horse and rider working cattle

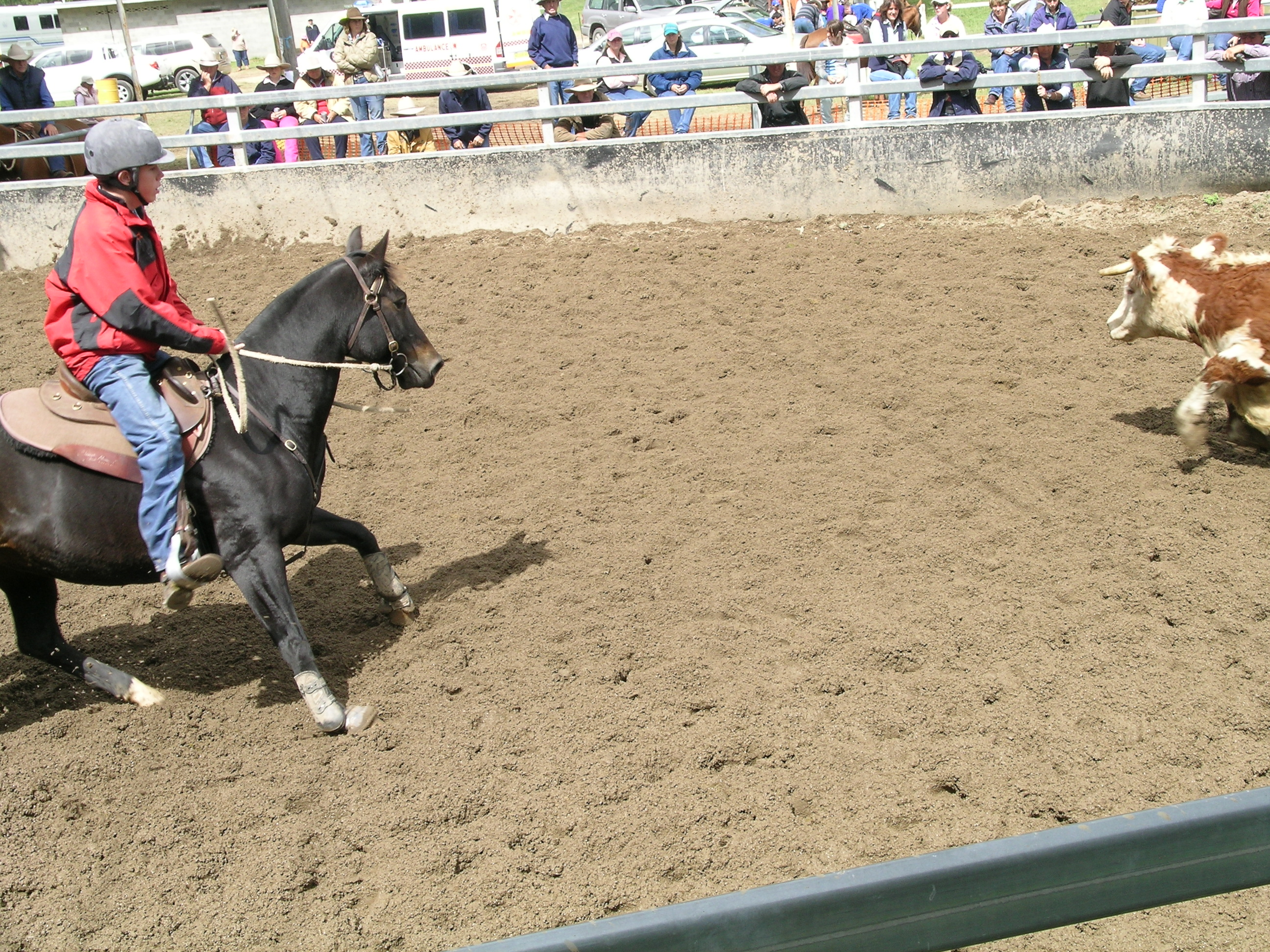
A junior cutting out on the "camp"

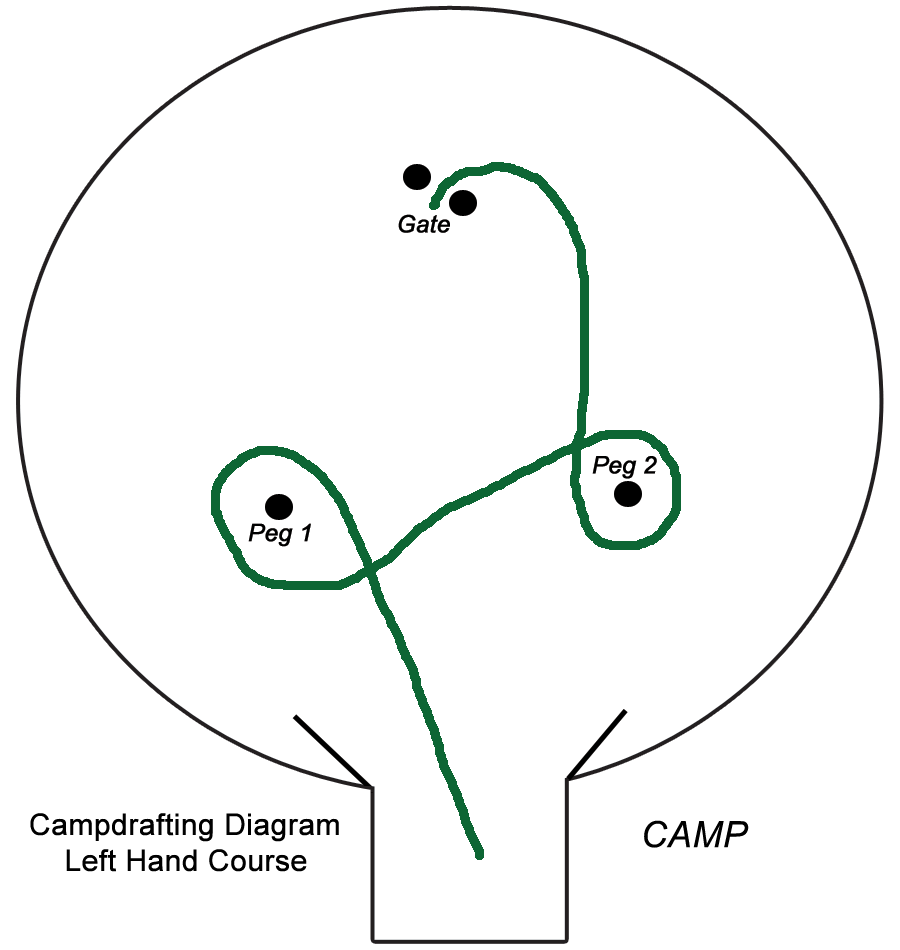
Standard left hand campdrafting course, once the steer or heifer is cut out

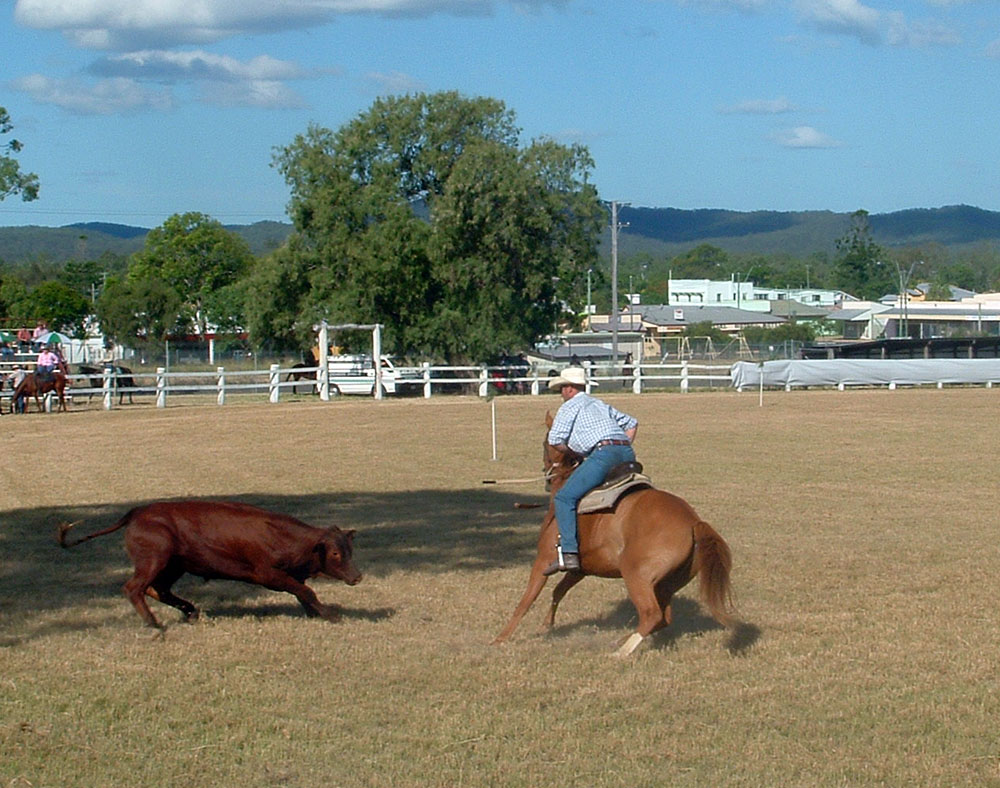
This competitor has lost control of his beast.

Campdrafting is a unique Australian sport involving a horse and rider working cattle. The riding style is Australian stock, somewhat akin to American Western riding and the event is similar to the American stock horse events such as cutting, working cow horse, team penning, and ranch sorting.

In a campdrafting competition, a rider on horseback must "cut out" one beast from the mob of cattle in the yard or the "camp" and block and turn the beast at least two or three times to prove to the judge that they have the beast under control; then take it out of the yard and through a course around pegs involving right and left hand turns in a figure eight, before guiding it through two pegs known as "the gate". The outside course must be completed in less than 40 seconds. Events for juniors 8 years and under 13 years have one sound beast in the camp or yard at all times. In other events it is recommended that there shall be a minimum of six head of sound stock in the camp at any time.

Up to a total of 100 points are scored by horse and rider: "Cut out" is worth a total of 26 points; horse work up to a further 70 points; and 4 points for the course. Most (signalled by a crack of the judge's stockwhip) occur when a competitor loses his beast more than twice on the camp; losing control of the beast in the arena or running a beast onto the arena fence. A "tail turn" executed by a horse in the opposite direction of the beast's line of travel also incurs disqualification at any stage of the draft.

The sport requires skill in selecting a beast from the mob that will run well, but is not too fast for the particular horse being ridden.

== History ==
It is thought the sport developed in outback Queensland among the stockmen and drovers in informal competitions to prove horse skills. The first formal campdrafting competition occurred in Tenterfield at the Tenterfield Show Society's 1885 show. Competing at this event was Clarence Smith, a cattleman and horse breeder near Tenterfield, on the Northern Tablelands, New South Wales. He went on to create the rules and judging procedures that the rules of today remain similar to.

The Warwick Gold Cup is one of the premier events on Australia's campdraft calendar where around 1,800 camp drafters compete for prize money over about four days of competition. Paradise Lagoons in Queensland is the venue of the richest campdraft in Australia with A$230,000 of prize money distributed over the four days of competition. The Acton Super Beef Open Campdraft has prize money of $80,000. This event, alone attracted 605 entries, which was conducted with two rounds and a final. The Queensland Triple Crown of campdrafting consists of the Condamine Bell, Chinchilla Grandfather Clock and Warwick Gold Cup campdrafts. Walcha, New South Wales, has held the National titles on several occasions as the district is one of the few able to supply the quantities of quality cattle needed for these big events.

Most campdrafting days schedule an open, maiden, novice, ladies' and junior events. Larger competition days may also include a draft for stallions and even bareback riders. Campdrafting has become a very popular family sport, with the husband, wife and a child sometimes competing on one horse in the ladies' campdraft, junior 'draft and then in another drafting event with the man up. There are 30,000 campdrafters (horses) currently (2008) registered and competing at various locations in Australia.

The Equine influenza outbreak in Australia during 2007 and 2008 saw many horse events cancelled including campdrafting. During this time some shows ran small campdraft events using motorcycles instead of horses.

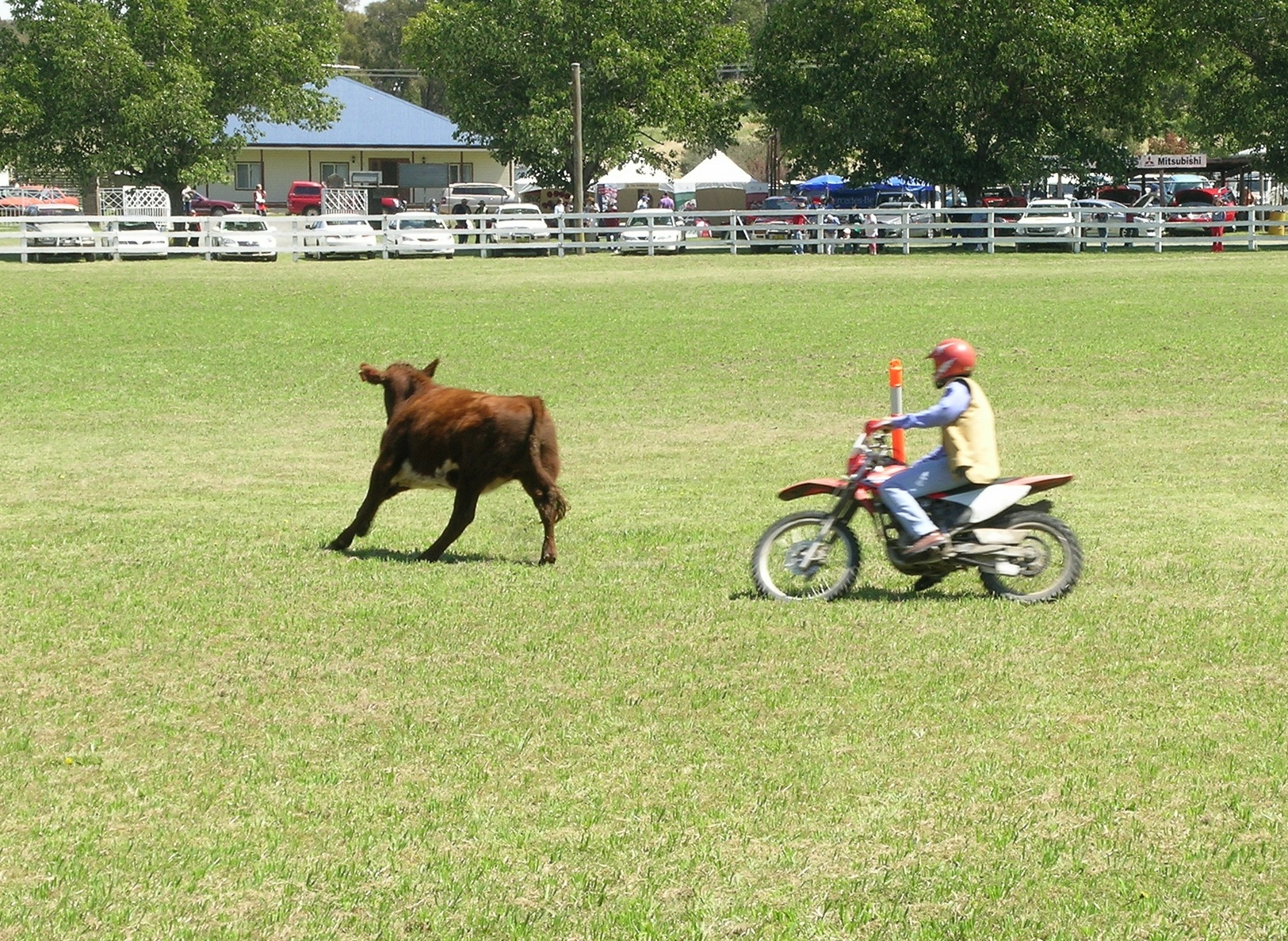
Motorcycle campdrafting, during the Equine Influenza outbreak

The Acton family has constructed a $3,000,000 purpose designed and constructed campdrafting complex situated on their property, Paradise Lagoons near Rockhampton, Queensland. In July 2008, $230,000 (A$) in prize money was available to successful competitors who competed here. During 2008, $500,000 was spent upgrading spectator facilities in preparation for the event. The annual Paradise Lagoons campdrafting events now have three non-stop arenas that operate for four days for increased prizemoney.

In February 2009 the richest campdraft, the $50,000 Landmark Classic Campdraft was held at the Australian Equine and Livestock Events Centre, Tamworth. Following this a new Australian record was established for a non-Thoroughbred horse sale when the annual Landmark Classic Campdraft Horse Sale was held here. The 320 horses sold here for $2.9 million to a top of $46,000 and an average of $9,075.

'Open campdrafting' is still practised on cattle properties when selected beasts are drafted from the mob while they are in their paddock, instead of droving the cattle for yard drafting.

The National Campdraft Council of Australia was formed around 2000 and oversees the four campdrafting bodies which are the Australian Bushmen's Campdraft and Rodeo Association (based in Tamworth), the Australian Campdraft Association (in Queensland), the Southern Campdrafters Association and Gippsland Campdraft Association (GCA). Campdrafting is recognised by the Australian Institute of Sport as a national sport.

== The horse ==
The ideal horse for this work is considered to be about 15 hands and agile enough to take a beast from the camp without trouble. He then needs the speed to control the beast and the body weight to push a big bullock round by pressure on his shoulder, if needed. Beyond this, he has to be willing, and have the cattle sense necessary in this most exacting, and often dangerous trial of strength between man, horse, and beast. A bigger horse is typically not suited to the sharp turns in this sport. A polo or polocrosse horses' work requirements are somewhat similar.

A good campdrafting horse does not take his eye off the beast and the rider has to watch his own seat when the horse is propping and turning on the job. If the steer will not be readily persuaded into making any particular turn, he may then be "shouldered" into position by the horse pushing him in the right direction.

The most popular breed of horse for campdrafting is the Australian Stock Horse. These horses developed from bloodlines of various breeds, some tracing back to stock that arrived with the earliest Australian colonists. Formal recognition of Australian Stock Horses as a distinct breed began in June 1971 when over one hundred campdrafters and horse breeders met to form the Australian Stock Horse Society.

The first sale of campdraft focused horses was held at the Landmark Classic Campdraft Sale, Tamworth on 24 May 2008. The 103 horses sold to (A$)$51,000 and averaged $10,456.

== See also ==
- Australian Stock Horse
