= Team penning =

Western equestrian sport

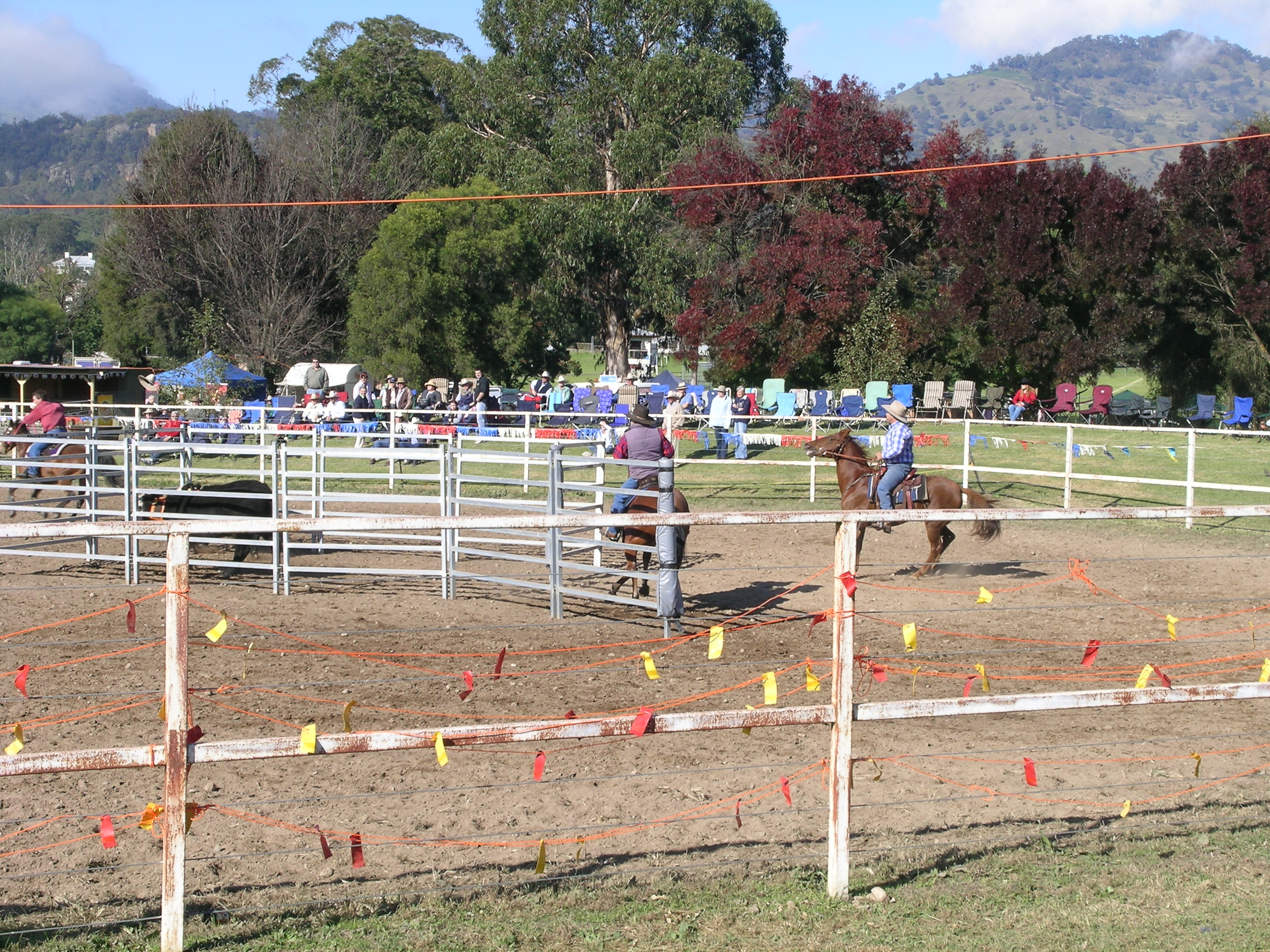
Team penning, Murrurundi, New South Wales

Team penning is a western equestrian sport that evolved from the common ranch work of separating cattle into pens for branding, doctoring, or transport.

Today it is a fast-paced event that gives a team of three riders on horseback from 60 to 90 seconds (depending on the class or the sanctioning of the event) to separate three specifically identified cattle from a herd of 30, and put them into a 16' x 24' pen through a 10' opening, at the opposite end of the arena.

The sport features 30 head of cattle, typically yearling beef cattle (mature cows or bulls are not allowed), with numbers affixed to their back, three each wearing a number from 0 through 9 or with colored collars attached. Timing starts once the line judge has dropped his flag as the lead rider's horse crosses the foul line. At that time, the announcer identifies the cattle to be separated by calling out a randomly drawn number or collar color. The riders must cut out the three head that have been nominated, take them to the opposite end of the arena, pen them and call for time.

Teamwork is the key with all three riders working in harmony to cut out the correct cattle and drive them to the pen while keeping the rest of the herd (sometimes called trash or dirty cattle) back.

The history of the sport is thought to date back to 1942 when brothers Ray and Joe Yanez, along with Canadian cowboy Bill Schwindt were sorting steers from a herd of cattle on a Ventura County, California ranch. During a lunch break the trio reportedly came upon the idea of organizing what were routine cowboy chores into a competitive sport, one in which cowboys could showcase their horsemanship. The first organized competition is thought to have taken place at the Ventura County Fair in August 1949.

Today, the sport is a fast-growing western horse sport in the United States, Canada, Australia, and Europe. In North America, the primary team penning sanctioning organization is the United States Team Penning Association (USTPA), headquartered in Fort Worth, Texas. There are an estimated 93,000 active team penners in North America.

== Related ==
- Ranch sorting
- Campdrafting
- Cutting (sport)
- Working cow horse
