= Ranch sorting =

Western-style equestrian sport

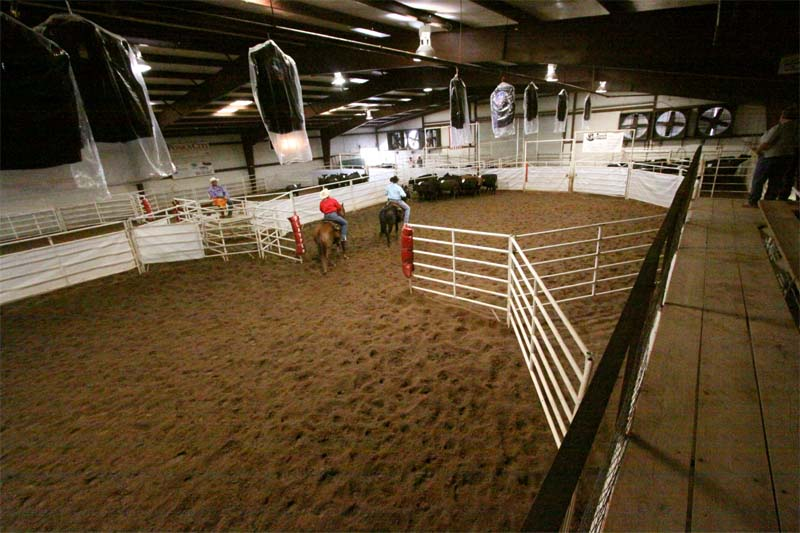
Ranch Sorting practice in Ponca City, Oklahoma

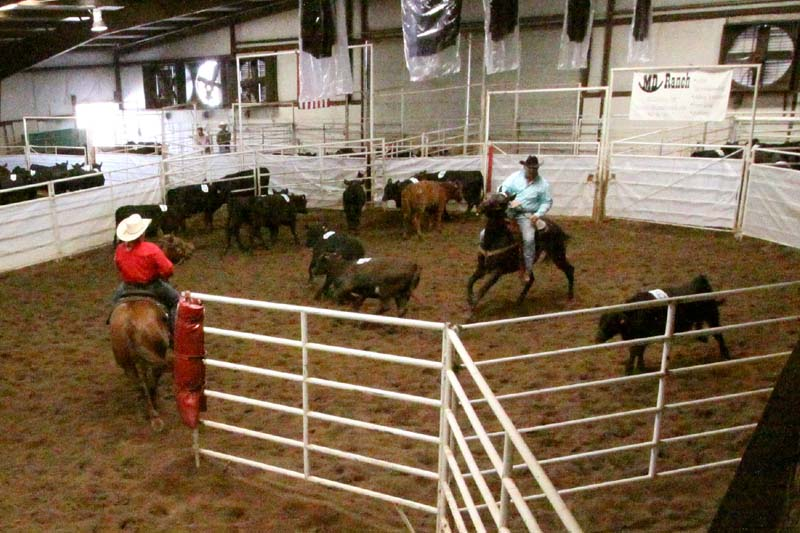
Riders move cattle one at a time from one pen to the other.

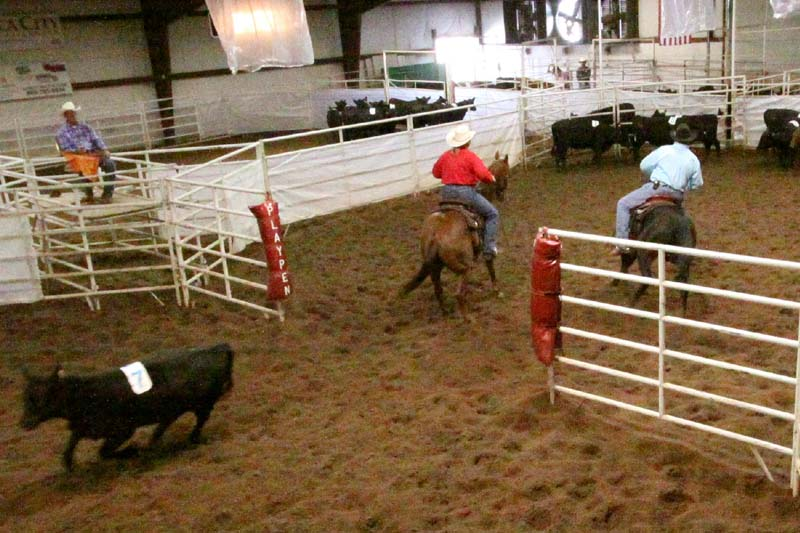
Once the correctly numbered calf goes through the gate the team moves on to the next calf. The fastest time to get 10 calves from one pen to the other wins.

Ranch sorting is a western-style equestrian sport that evolved from the common ranch work of separating cattle into pens for branding, doctoring, or transport. Ranch Sorting is an event that pits a team of two riders on horseback against the clock. Teamwork is the key with both riders working in harmony to cut out the correct cattle and drive them to the pen while keeping the wrong numbered cattle back. There are several variations of ranch sorting with one, two or three riders on the team, but all require sorting the cattle from one pen to the other in the correct order.

== Setup and rules ==
Ranch sorting and its sister discipline, team penning, are regulated by the United States Team Penning Association (USTPA), headquartered in Fort Worth, Texas. The USTPA was founded in 1993 in Fort Worth with the purpose of attracting more participants and educating them to the sports of Team Penning and Ranch Sorting.

Ranch sorting is performed in two pens that are fifty to sixty feet long with a twelve to sixteen foot opening between the pens. The corners of the pens are cut at 45 degrees. Both pens are the same size and sorting can take place from either pen to the other.

At the beginning, there are ten calves at the end of one of the pens with numbers on their sides for identification. The judge raises the flag and when the riders cross the gap between the two pens the clock starts and the competition begins. The team of two riders have to move the cattle one at a time from one pen to the other in numerical order, starting with a random number called by the judge. The fastest time wins. If a calf gets from one pen to the other out of order, then the team is disqualified.

== Levels ==
Ranch Sorting contestants are rated from a #1 (Beginner) to #9 (professional) based on their ability level. Classifications of #1 are Beginners, #2 are Rookies, #3 and #4 are for participants of Novice ability, classifications of #5 and #6 for amateur participants and classifications of #7, #8 and #9 are for Open or Professional participants.

== Related equestrian sports ==
There are several other equestrian sports related to ranch sorting. Team penning is similar competition except that a team of three riders on horseback have from 60 to 75 seconds to separate three cattle from a herd and put them into a single pen. Open arena ranch sorting also has three riders on horseback, but in an 'open arena' with numbered cows at the far end. As the riders cross a white line, the announcer says a number between 0 and 9. Starting with that number, riders have 75 seconds to sort the cattle, in order, over the white line. Cutting is a sport where a horse and rider are judged on their ability to separate a calf away from a cattle herd and keep it from returning to the herd for a set period of time. In Australia, Campdrafting is an event where a rider on horseback must "cut out" one animal from the "mob" (herd) of cattle, and "camp", block and turn it at least two or three times to prove to the judge that they have the beast under control.

== See also ==
- Cowboy
- Reining
- Rodeo
