= National Reined Cow Horse Association =

Equestrian organization

- Sport: Working cow horse
- Founded: 1949
- Countries: United States
- Most recent champions: Life By The Drop and Chris Dawson (2024)
- Website: nrcha.com

The National Reined Cow Horse Association (NRCHA) is an equestrian organization in Pilot Point, Texas, United States, that began by promoting and staging Working cow horse events.

== History ==
The National Reined Cow Horse Association (formerly known as the California Reined Cow Horse Association) was founded in 1949. Its purpose is to continue the centuries long tradition process of training used by the vaqueros of California. The reined cow horse was a necessity in the 18th to 19th century on ranches. However, by the beginning of the 20th century, the need for this type of horse dissipated, especially during the Great Depression. Later, it was revived as a luxury sport, and the NRCHA now is the association that promotes and educates competitors about the sport.

== Organization ==
=== Events ===
- Celebration of Champions – the World Championship Show features the top ranked horses and riders.
- NRCHA Stallion Stakes – Four and five-year-olds by subscribed stallions compete in snaffle bit and hackamore events.
- Tres Osos Cowhorse Derby – Four and five-year-old horses compete in several events, many had competed in snaffle bit futurities at age three.
- Hackamore Classic – For five year old horses. Must not have been shown in a bridle down the fence previously at a judged reined cow horse event.
- Snaffle Bit Futurity – Three year old horses compete in three separate events. The most popular event.
- The NRCHA also sanctions events by other associations, holds clinics, holds special events, and holds premium media events.

=== Hall of Fame ===
The Hall of Fame of the association includes both horses and people; there is a hall of merit for those who have contributed outside the show pen.

=== Champions ===
The association makes various annual awards to members, for champion horse-rider pairs, for high-earning riders and for high-earning sires.

In 1993 the Open snaffle bit champions were Sandy Collier on Miss Rey Dry.

Million-dollar sires have included Shining Spark ($4,139,387.73), Smart Chic Olena ($3,208,841.59) and Smart Little Lena ($1,214,960.01).
