= Reining =

Type of western horse riding competition

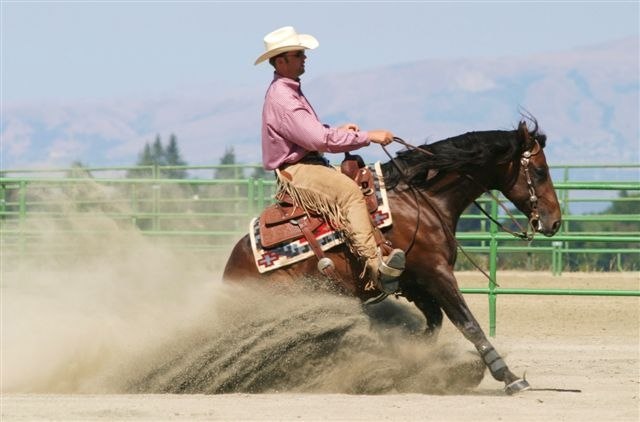
- A competitor performing the sliding stop, one of the signature and most crowd-pleasing moves of a reining horse
- Highest governing body: International Federation for Equestrian Sports (FEI)
- First played: United States

Characteristics
- Contact: no
- Team members: individual and team at international levels
- Mixed-sex: yes
- Type: indoor or outdoor
- Equipment: horse, western saddle and related horse tack, including bit, spurs, chaps, and headstall.
- Venue: Arena indoor or outdoor with dirt or similar footing suitable for the horse

Presence
- Country or region: Worldwide

Reining is a western riding competition for horses in which the riders guide the horses through a precise pattern of circles, spins, and stops. All work is done at the lope (a version of the horse gait more commonly known worldwide as the canter), or the gallop (the fastest of the horse gaits). Originating from working cattle, reining requires the horse to be responsive and in tune with its rider, whose aids should not be easily seen, and judges the horse on its ability to perform a set pattern of movements. The horse should be willingly guided or controlled with little or no apparent resistance and dictated to completely. A horse that pins his ears, conveys a threat to his rider, refuses to go forward, runs sideways, bounces his rear, wrings his tail in irritation, or displays an overall poor attitude is not being guided willingly, and is judged accordingly. If a horse jogs or breaks gait it is a 0.The Change needs to be in the middle of the arena.

== Origins ==
Throughout the colonization of the Americas, dating back to the earliest Spanish settlers in what today is Mexico and the Southwestern United States, including Texas and California, ranchers needed to manage cattle from horseback. Cattle were moved, branded, doctored, sorted, and herded, often on open range without the benefit of fences, barns or other means of holding the animals. A good cowboy needed a quick and nimble horse, one that could change directions quickly, stop "on a dime," and sprint after an errant cow. The horse needed to be controlled mostly by legs and weight, ridden with only one hand and a light touch on the reins, so that the cowboy's attention could also be on tasks that could include handling a lariat (to rope cattle), opening a gate, or simply waving a hand, hat or rope to move along a reluctant herd animal. Informal demonstrations of these ideal characteristics amongst ranch cowboys and vaqueros evolved into the sport of reining, as well as the related events of cutting and working cow horse as well as several other horse show classes.

Other nations with traditions of herding livestock on vast areas, such as Australia and Argentina, developed similar traditions that have blended into the sport as it has expanded worldwide.

== Movements ==
The reining pattern includes an average of eight to twelve movements which must be executed by the horse. Patterns require the following movements:

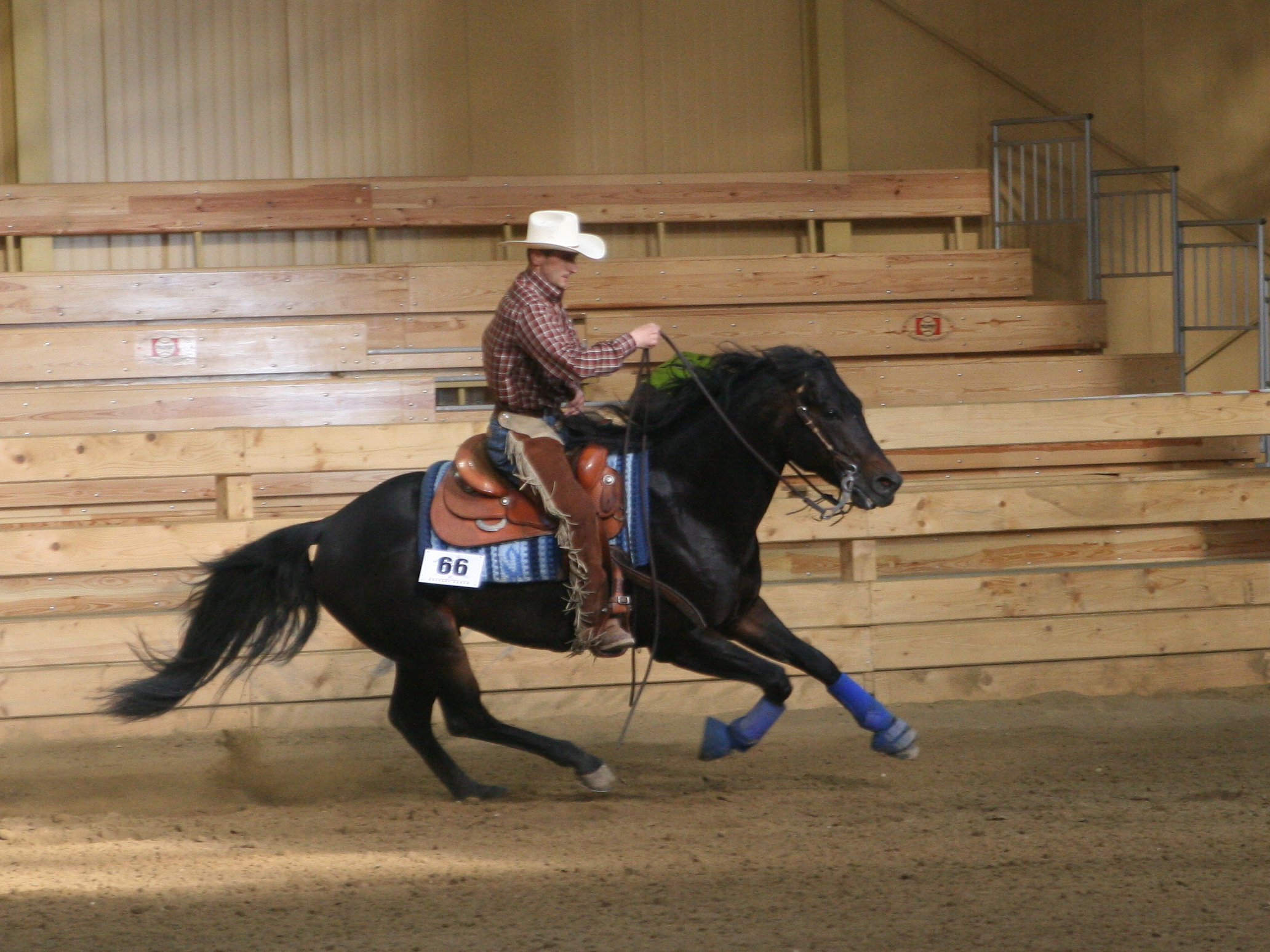
Circles are performed at speed

- Circles: the horse must perform large, fast circles at a near-gallop and smaller, slow circles at a lope. They should be perfectly round, with the rider dictating the pace of the horse. There should be an easily seen change of speed as the rider transitions from the large, fast to the small, slow circles. Most circles incorporate changes of direction that require a flying change of lead.
- Flying lead change: the horse changes its leading front and hind legs at the lope mid-stride, during the suspension phase of the gait. The horse should not break gait nor change speed. It can be used for as turning and direction. While completing a change at speed can improve one's score, precision is the most important factor in judging: A horse taking more than one stride to complete the change, or a horse that changes early, late, or that changes only the front feet and not the hind feet will be penalized.
- Rundown: the horse gallops or "runs" along the long side of the arena, at least 20 feet (6 m) from the fence or rail. A rundown is a required movement prior to a sliding stop and a rollback to the designated direction (either towards the judge or towards the nearest wall depending on the pattern).

- Sliding Stop: the horse accelerates to a gallop and then suddenly comes to a complete halt, planting its hind feet in the footing and allowing its hind feet to slide several feet, while continuing to let its front feet "walk" forward. The back should be raised upward and hindquarters come well underneath. A particularly powerful stop may, depending on arena conditions, produce flying dirt and a cloud of dust. The movement should finish in a straight line, and the horse's position should not change. This movement is a crowd favorite, along with spins (see below).
- Back or Backup: the horse backs up quickly for at least 10 feet (3 m). The horse must back in a perfectly straight line, stop when asked and hesitate a moment before the next movement. It is judged on how quick, smooth and straight the line is.
- Rollback: the horse immediately, without hesitation, performs a 180-degree turn after halting from a sliding stop, and immediately goes forward again into a lope. The horse must turn on its hindquarters, bringing its hocks well under, and the motion should be continuous with no hesitation.

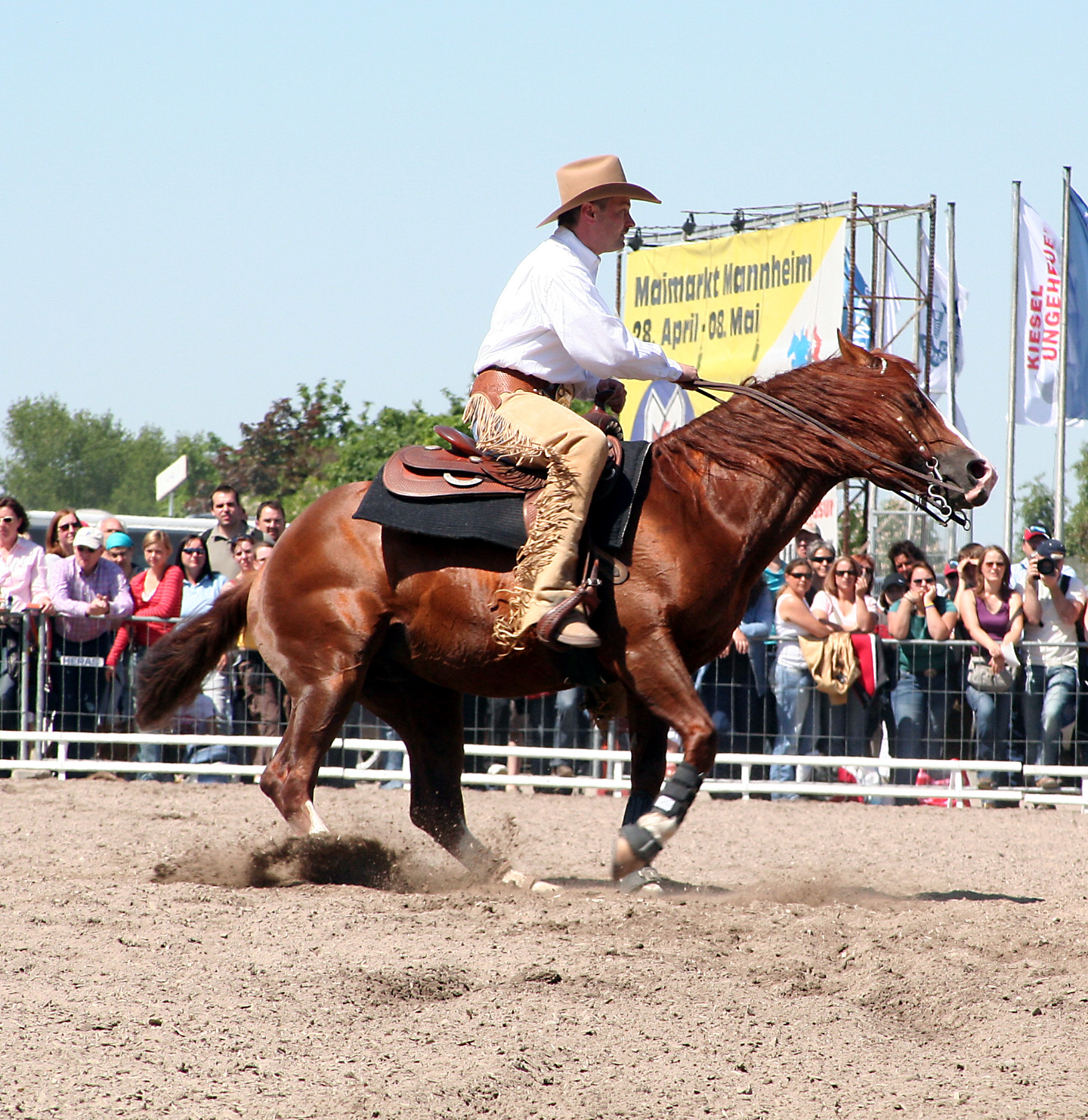
The spin is one of the most difficult and crowd-pleasing maneuvers

- Spins or Turnarounds: beginning from a standstill, the horse spins 360 degrees or more (up to four and one-quarter full turns) in place around its stationary inside hind leg. The hind pivot foot remains in essentially the same location throughout the spin, though the horse will pick it up and put it down as it turns. Spins are judged on correctness, smoothness, and cadence. Speed adds to the difficulty and will improve the score of a correctly done spin. A pattern requires at least one set of spins in each direction. Horses must stop the spin in the designated place or be penalized for over or under spinning. The term Pivot is sometimes used to describe a turn on the hindquarters of up to 360 degrees where the horse has to keep a rear pivot foot stationary. In 4-H competition, pivots of 90, 180, or 360 degrees are sometimes used in pattern classes to introduce youth riders to reining concepts.
- Pause or Hesitate: the horse is asked to stand still for a few seconds to "settle" between certain movements in the reining pattern, particularly after spins. Pauses are not judged as a movement per se, but a horse that is ill-mannered or behaves with impatience when asked to wait will be penalized.

== Scoring ==
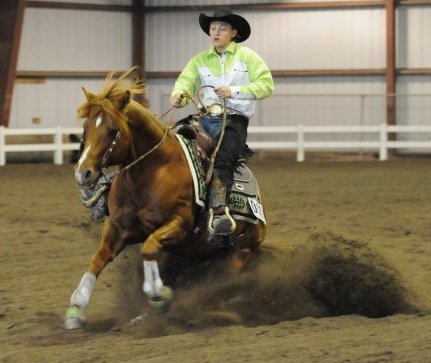
A proper sliding stop requires a horse to keep its head down, back rounded, hindquarters well underneath the body, and to "walk" with the front legs as the hind legs slide.

Scoring is on the basis of 70 and it is an average score for a horse that made no errors but also did not perform maneuvers with a higher level of difficulty. Points for each maneuver are added or subtracted by 1/2-, 1-, and 1 1/2-point increments for each of the 7 to 8 maneuvers in the designated pattern as follows:

- −1 1/2 for an extremely poor execution
- −1 for very poor
- −1/2 for poor
- 0 for correct with no degree of difficulty
- +1/2 for good execution
- +1 for very good
- +1 1/2 for excellent

Each part of the pattern is judged on precision, smoothness, and finesse. The "degree of difficulty" for each maneuver, typically related to speed and agility, is also assessed. Increased speed increases the difficulty of most movements and the potential for a high score. For example, a perfectly executed fast spin will score higher than an equally perfectly executed slow one. A score below 70 reflects deductions for poorly performed movements or penalties, a score above 70 reflects that some or all movements were above average.

In addition to the scores for each maneuver, a large variety of penalties may be assessed for specific infractions. Penalties may range from a half-point to five points for each infraction, and in some cases a significant error may result in a zero score for the run. Certain misbehaviors may incur penalty points beyond a poor score for a given maneuver. Significant errors, such as going off pattern or using illegal equipment, will result in a "zero score". Under NRHA rules, horses with a zero score cannot earn a placing or advance in a multi-go event, though they may be eligible for a payout if there is a small number of horses in the entire competition. Some sanctioning organizations other than NRHA may allow a horse in a small class to earn an award for last place. Major mistakes, such as failure to present the horse for an equipment check, a rider with illegal equipment or one who abuses the animal in specified ways, result in a "no score," which prevents the horse from earning any award or payout, even if it is the only horse in the class.

== The horse ==
Reining may be performed by any horse, but the Stock horse breeds, particularly the American Quarter Horse, dominate the field. The reining horse must be agile, quick, and very responsive to the rider's commands. Powerful hindquarters are required to hold position in a sliding stop or a rollback, excellent coordination is required for proper spins and flying lead changes. Correct leg conformation is essential, as the limbs and joints are often under considerable stress in competition. The horse must also have an excellent temperament to perform with both speed and precision.

== Equipment and attire ==
Riders must use a western saddle. Spurs are allowed, but whips are not. Bridles are western-styled, without a noseband or cavesson. The bosal style hackamore is also allowed on "junior" horses. There are very strict rules about what types of bits and bosals are legal.

For protection, horses usually wear brushing boots on their lower front legs as well as skid boots on their hind fetlocks. Bell boots, which wrap around the pastern and protect the hoof and coronary band, are also usually seen, sometimes only on the front feet, other times on all four feet. Exercise bandages are also another form of protection that is used, this helps give support to the tendons and ligaments, and prevents bruising and irritation. These can be used on all four legs but if wrapped improperly can cause damage.

Reining horses are usually fitted with special horseshoes on the hind feet called slide plates. Slide plates have wider bar steel and are smoother than regular horseshoes, with even the nail heads filed to be flush with the shoe. When the horse plants its hind feet for a sliding stop, the shoes allow the hind legs to slide along the ground with less resistance. Slide plates often have long trailers to help the horse's hind legs slide in a straight path as well as a rolled toe so that the front of the hoof does not accidentally catch the ground.

Riders must wear a long-sleeved shirt, jeans, and cowboy boots. In most competitions, they also wear chaps. Gloves are optional. There has historically been less difference between men's and women's attire in reining than in most western events, though women's clothing is more influenced by fashion trends from Western pleasure competition, and thus women sometimes wear brighter colors, and are more apt to add a decorated jacket or vest, though usually not as flashy as in other horse show events. Wearing a certified equestrian helmet is permitted by some organizations, though not commonly used.

== Bit and Hackamore rules ==
Horses in most types of reining competition are required to perform in a curb bit. In most cases, riders with a horse in a curb must give all rein commands with only one hand.

Riders may use both hands when a horse is ridden with a snaffle bit or a bosal hackamore. However, snaffles and hackamores ridden with both hands are usually limited only to special classes for horses between the ages of three and five years old. Most of the time, with the exception of "freestyle" classes, snaffle bit and hackamore horses do not compete directly against curb bit horses, though specific details vary depending on the particular sanctioning organization. In the last thirty years, the snaffle bit is the more common headgear used on younger horses, but in the past, the hackamore was more common. Some local or regional competitions offer a non-sanctioned "novice horse" division where horses of any age who have limited experience as reining horses can be ridden two-handed in a snaffle.

Sometimes reining classes at breed shows are split into "junior horse" and "senior horse" divisions. Depending on the breed, Junior horses are either 3, 4 or 5 years old, and allowed to show in a snaffle or bosal. Senior horses who age out of the junior horse divisions at age six must be shown in a curb. The rules have changed over the years to reduce the stress on young horses. Junior horse divisions at one time were limited to horses that were only 3 and, sometimes, 4 years old. Expansion to age five parallels the standards set by the FEI and in endurance competitions, recognizing that the physical and mental development of most young horses is not considered complete until that time. Further, though many western stock horse breeds are started under saddle at the age of two, they generally are not physically or mentally ready to be entered into any type of reining competition at that age and in some cases are prohibited from entering any performance class until at least 2 1/2 years old. Both the NRHA and many breed associations offer snaffle bit futurities, usually for three-year-old horses, which pay very large purses.

== Reining competition ==
Reining as a sport was first recognized by the American Quarter Horse Association (AQHA) in 1949, and later by the United States Equestrian Federation (USEF) in its western division and within a number of its breed divisions. The National Reining Horse Association (NRHA) was formed in 1966 in the United States, and developed a worldwide membership as well as standardized rules and patterns that significantly influenced other organizations, including the AQHA and USEF. The sport of reining became an FEI-recognized discipline in 2000, and FEI-sanctioned reining competitions are held across the world, including at the World Equestrian Games. In 2011, USA Reining was established to serve as the reining sport affiliate for the USEF and FEI competition structure in the United States.

Individual divisions at a reining competition vary with the sanctioning organization. However, standard classes include those limited to junior or senior horses, to horses of a specific age (such as three-year-olds), classes for professional, "non-pro," or amateur riders (those who do not work with horses for pay), youth riders of various ages, adult riders over age 40 or 50, as well as open events for all competitors. Classes may also be limited by the experience level of the horse or the rider.

=== National ===
In individual nations where reining competitions are held, national organizations usually oversee the sport. Reining classes can be held at a stand-alone competition just for reiners, or as one category within many different classes offered at a horse show. For example, in the United States, the National Reining Horse Association (NRHA) creates patterns and develops judging standards, sanctioning events open to all breeds. However, the United States Equestrian Federation (USEF) and its reining discipline affiliate, USA Reining, are the national organizations overseeing FEI and high performance competition in the USA, but also work with the NRHA in non-FEI open reining competition sanctioned by the USEF, and in individual horse breed show reining competition governed by the USEF, such as Morgans or Arabians. Breed organizations that sanction their own shows, including those for Quarter Horses (AQHA), Appaloosas (ApHC), and American Paint Horses (APHA) also cooperate with the NRHA.

=== International ===
International competitions are regulated by the International Federation for Equestrian Sports (FEI). Reining was an FEI discipline from the year 2000, up until 2021. Reining is growing in popularity around the world, including Europe and Australia. It was added as a part of the World Equestrian Games, beginning in 2002.

=== Freestyle ===
A competitor in Freestyle reining, dressed as Miss Piggy

Freestyle reining allows a horse and rider team to incorporate reining movements into a three and one-half minute musical routine, akin to the KUR Freestyle competition in Dressage, but with elements that resemble the freestyle events in human competitions such as figure skating. Under NRHA rules, costumes are allowed, though not required; riders may ride with one, two or even no hands on any type of NRHA approved bit; props, within certain limits, are allowed; and the show management may allow special arena lighting. Freestyle reining competitions have no specific rules as to saddle, though humane equipment is required. Allowing "no hands" means that some competitors may perform without a bridle, which increases the difficulty of the movements. The rider must include a specified number of spins, stops and flying lead changes in a performance. Rollbacks, rein backs and dressage type maneuvers such as the half-pass may be added and scored. Competitors are judged on technical merit and artistic impression. At some competitions, an applause meter is added and may contribute to the artistic impression portion of the score.

College Level

Equestrian is a Division 1 and Division 3 sport recognized by the NCAA. Single discipline teams are in Division 3, only competing in English, and Division 1 teams consist of English and Western, including reining, horsemanship, flat, and jumping.

== See also ==
- Horse
- Campdrafting
- Cutting (sport)
- Cowboy
- Ranch
- Ranch sorting
- Team penning
- Western riding
- Working cow horse
- International Federation for Equestrian Sports (FEI)
- United States Equestrian Federation (USEF)
- American Quarter Horse Association (AQHA)
- National Reining Horse Association (NRHA)
- National Reined Cow Horse Association (NRCHA)
