= Cutting (sport) =

Western-style equestrian competition

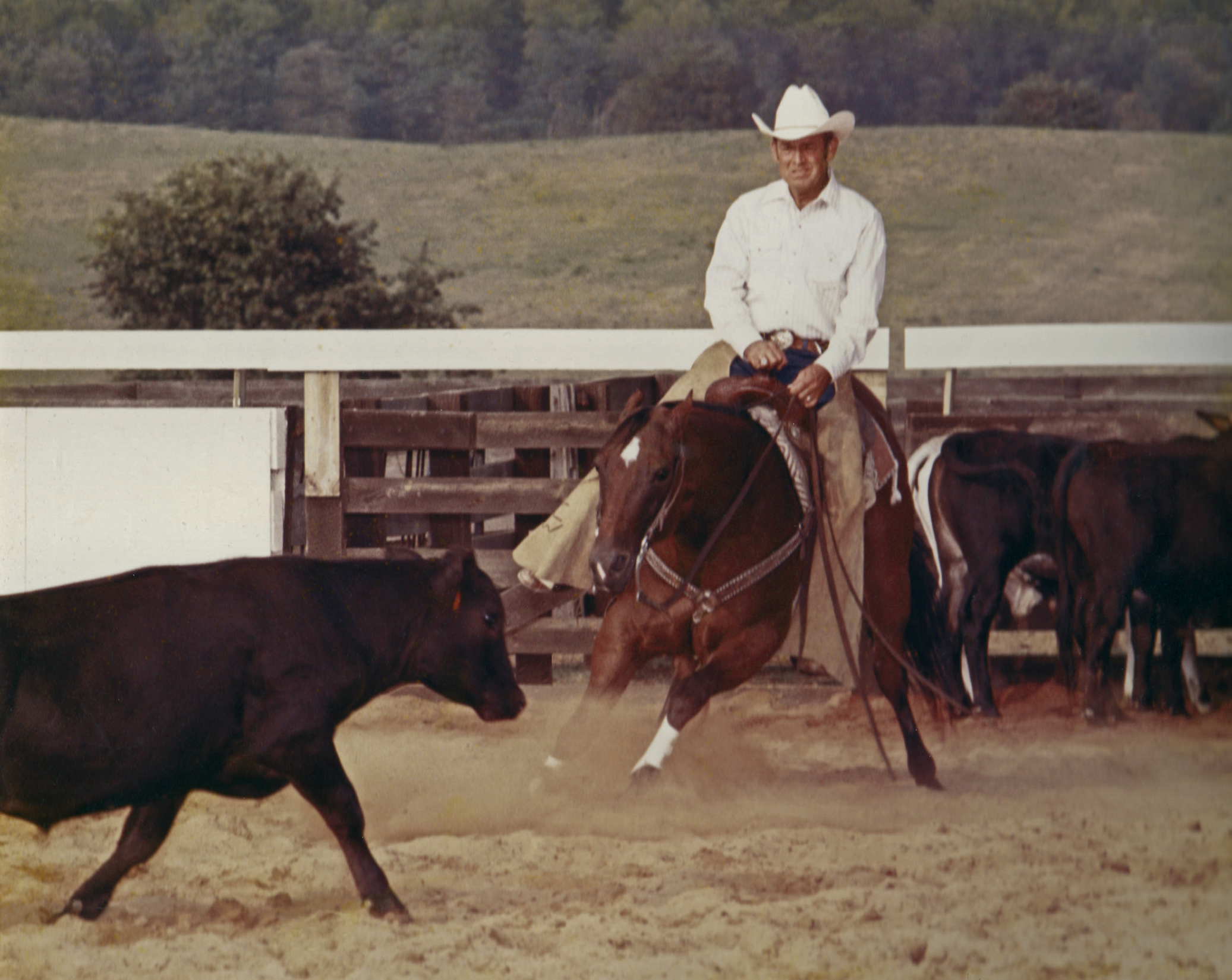
- A cutting horse working a cow
- Clubs: National Cutting Horse Association (NCHA)

Characteristics
- Mixed-sex: yes
- Type: Western riding
- Equipment: Western saddle; bridle with bit, or hackamore; split reins; optional chaps and spurs
- Venue: National Cutting Horse Association events, single-breed horse shows, American Cutting Horse Association events, annual stock shows and rodeos

Young cutting horse at training clinic

Cutting is a western-style equestrian competition in which a horse and rider work together before a judge or panel of judges to demonstrate the horse's athleticism and ability to handle cattle. Modern competition utilizes a 2 1/2 minute performance, called a "run". Each contestant is assisted by four helpers: two are designated as turnback riders, who help to keep cattle from running off to the back of the arena, the other two are designated as herd holders to keep the cattle bunched together and prevent potential strays from escaping into the work area. Cutting cattle are typically young steers and heifers that customarily range in size from 400 to 650 lb (180 to 290 kg). They usually are of Angus or Hereford lineage though may be a mix of crossbred beef cattle, including Charolais Braford or Brahman lineage.

A contestant is required to make at least two cuts from the herd, one of which must be a cut from deep inside the herd while the other(s) can be peeled from the edges. Once the selected cow has been driven clear of the herd, the contestant commits the horse by dropping the rein hand to feed slack and give the horse its head. At that point, it is almost entirely up to the horse except for allowable leg cues from the rider to prevent the cow from returning to the herd. Judges score a run on a scale from 60 to 80, with 70 being an average score.

Cutting dates back to a time when ranchers in the American West hired cowboys to work herds of cattle out on the open range. Certain horses specialized in sorting and separating individual cattle from the herd when needed. Cutting moved from the open range to modern arena competition, often held indoors. Some sanctioned events at the national and international level offer added million dollar purses.

Cutting horse competition is primarily governed by the rules and regulations established by the National Cutting Horse Association (NCHA) located in Fort Worth, Texas, with affiliates in Australia and Europe. Other events may be governed by different sets of rules, such as those of the American Cutting Horse Association, or limited to a single horse breed and sanctioned by a breed association. The NCHA may approve independent events upon request, provided the classes offered meet the qualifications and adhere to the rules established by the NCHA.

== Description ==
A cutting horse is said to possess an innate ability to anticipate or read a cow's intended moves; an ability commonly referred to as having cow sense or cow smarts. Competitive cutting horses are well-trained and conditioned athletes with skills honed to constrain the movement of a cow and prevent it from returning to the herd. Such horses are able to stop and turn instantaneously, in sync with a cow's every move. The harder a cow tries to get back the herd, the more instinct, skill and athleticism are required of the horse to stay head to head with the cow, and the higher the competition score. A common analogy is a basketball point guard holding off a defender. American Quarter Horses and other horse breeds with Quarter Horse ancestry, such as American Paint Horses are the most popular choices for the sport, although other breeds with stock horse type are also used, particularly in breed-specific competition.

== History ==
The sport evolved from tasks performed by horses on cattle ranches in the American West. Ranch horses worked herds of cattle and often had to separate specific individuals from the herd for branding and various treatments such as vaccinating, castrating and deworming. Early cutting competitions were held among local ranchers and cowboys to determine who had the best cutting horse. In 1898, the first cutting horse competition known to be advertised to the public was held in Haskell, Texas. On March 14, 1908, the Old North Side Coliseum, now known as the Cowtown Coliseum in Fort Worth, Texas, hosted the first indoor cutting horse contest which grew into the Southwestern Exposition and Fat Stock Show. In 1918, the Fort Worth Stock Show hosted the world's first indoor rodeo, and added a cutting horse exhibition in 1919, held in connection with the rodeo. With the growth of cutting horse contests, a group of cutting horse owners decided to establish a universal set of rules and regulations, and founded the National Cutting Horse Association (NCHA) in 1946.

== Cattle ==
A variety of cattle breeds are used for cutting horse competition but the preferred types are young steers and heifers ranging in size from 400 to 650 lb (180 to 290 kg). The most popular breeds among cutters include Angus, Hereford, or crossbreeds of those types, as well as other breeds of beef cattle, such as Charolais and Brahman, or various crosses of those breeds. The ability of a competitor to pick the best cows to show their horse is a highly developed skill that will either make or break a run. When possible, cutters will watch other competitors show to see how the cattle react, and which cows make the best candidates. When selecting a cow from the herd, riders may use characteristics or markings to identify an individual animal to select an animal offering the horse its best opportunity for a good run. The cow selected by a rider needs to challenge but not overwhelm the horse.

== Competition rules ==
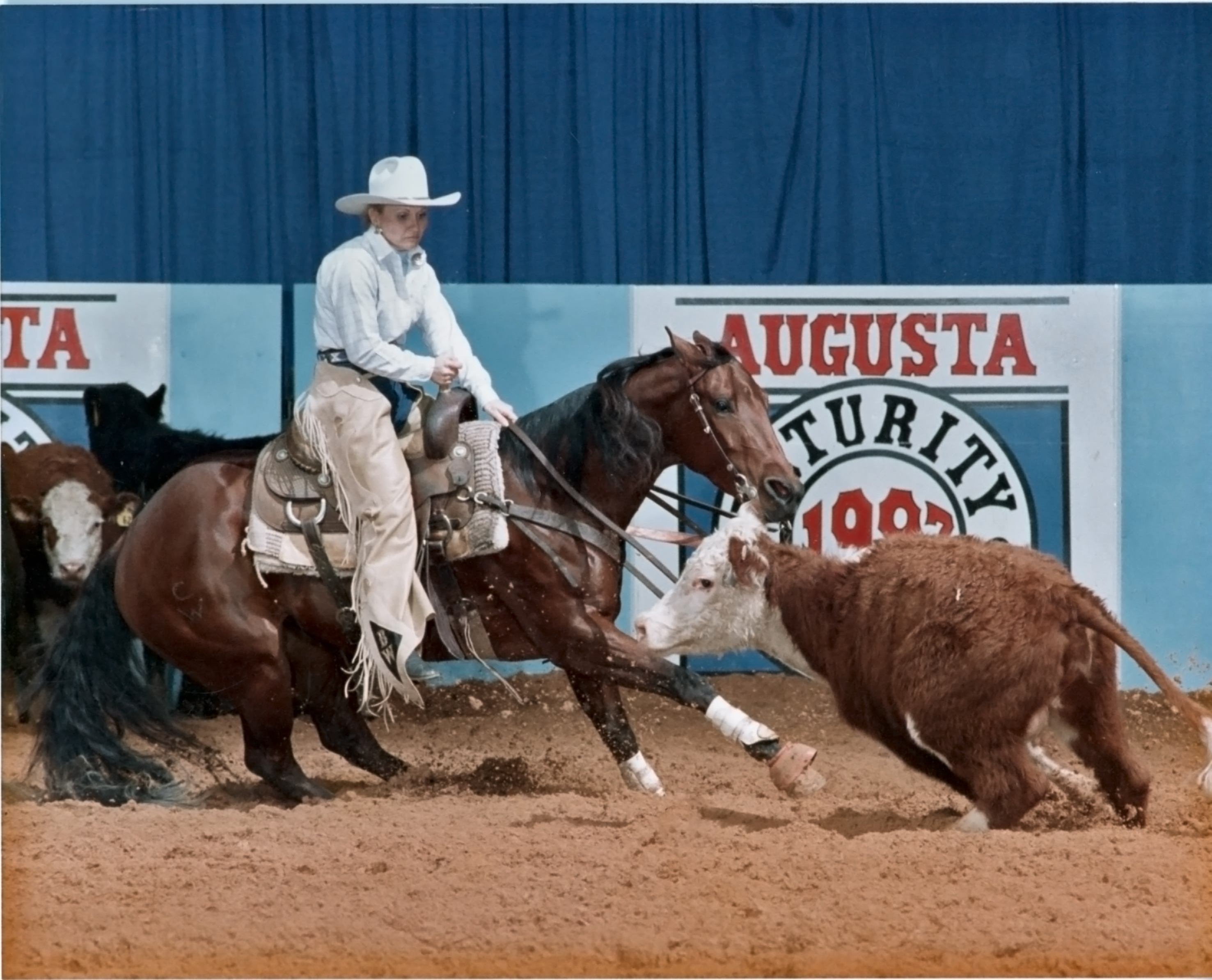
The goal of cutting is to separate a cow from its herd and prevent it from returning. A person riding the horse in competition wears western clothing, including a cowboy hat. The horse is ridden with a western-style cutting saddle and a bridle.

The National Cutting Horse Association (NCHA) is the primary organization that governs open cutting competitions, and the organization's rules are generally adopted by other entities that offer cutting at competitions not governed by the NCHA. NCHA events are open to registered and non-registered horses regardless of breed, although Quarter Horses are most common. Breed associations may host competition limited to a single breed.

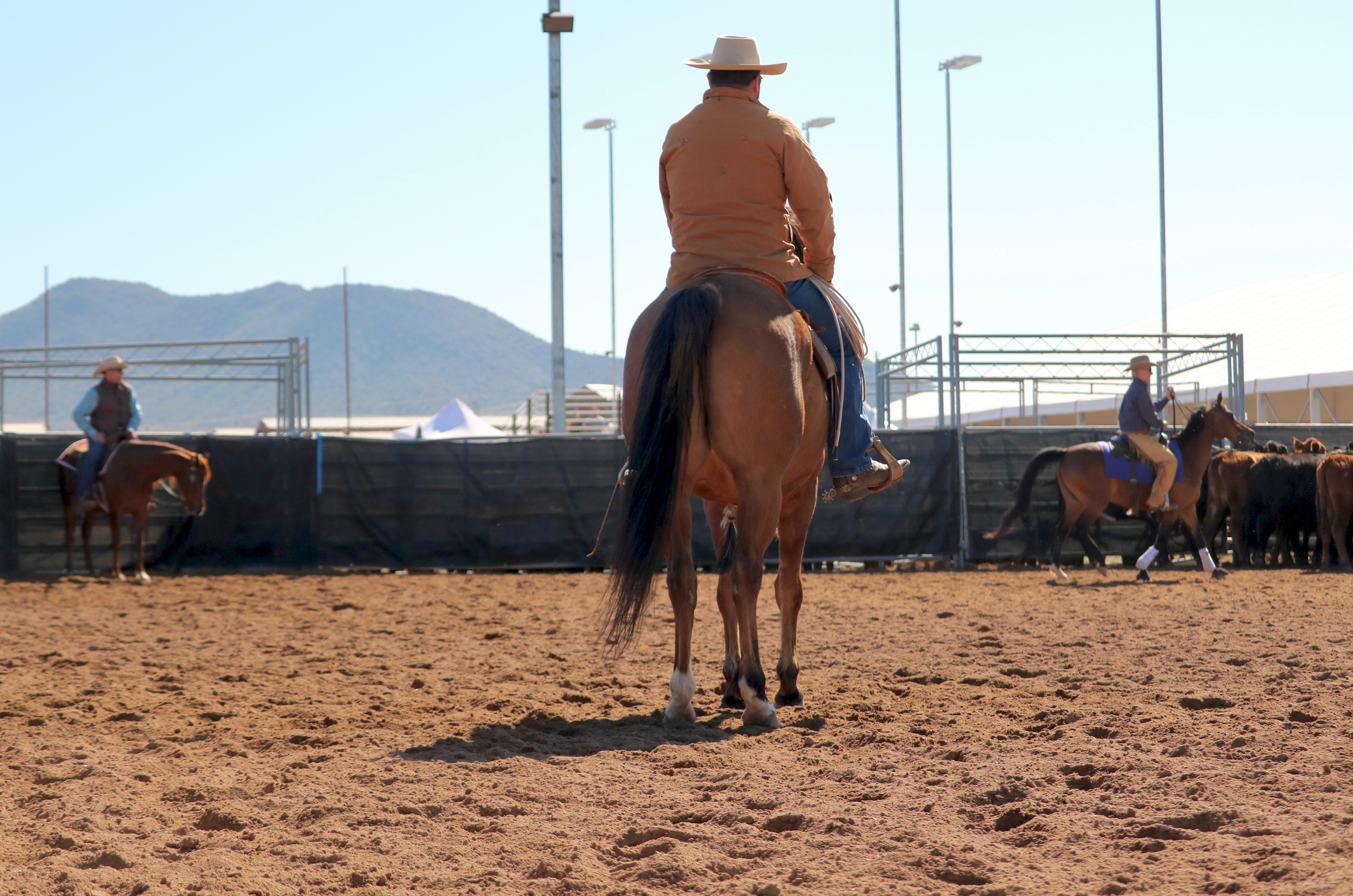
Turnback riders prevent the cow from running away from the cutting horse

Cutting events consist of individual runs in each class within a respective division. Each contestant is allowed 2½ minutes to show their horse to a panel of judges. A contestant is assisted by four helpers of their choice: two are designated as turnback riders who keep cattle from running off to the back of the arena, and the other two are designated as herd holders to keep the remaining cattle bunched together and prevent potential strays from escaping into the work area. A contestant is required to make at least two cuts from the herd, one of which must be a cut from deep inside the herd; others can be peeled from the edges. Once the cut has been made and the selected animal has been driven clear of the herd, the contestant commits the horse to that cow by dropping the rein hand to the horse's neck which gives the horse its head. At that point it is almost entirely up to the horse to prevent the calf from returning to the herd. Judges will score a run on a scale from 60 to 80, with 70 being an average score.

A performance is judged on a number of factors, including the overall attitude of the horse (called "courage") as well as its eye appeal, herd work, control of the cow, degree of difficulty, time worked, and working without visible control by the rider. A rider can be disqualified for using illegal equipment, leaving the working area before the time limit is reached, and for inhumane treatment of the horse. A horse and rider team is penalized if forced off a cow, if the horse charges a cow, excessive herd holder help, and judges either add or take away points based on the horse and rider's performance throughout their run.

Variables considered in judging include:

- confidence when entering the herd with minimal disturbance;
- making a clean cut by setting up a cow in the middle of the working area;
- level of skill and the degree of difficulty involved in containing a cow as close to the center of the working area as possible, all on a loose rein without disturbing the herd;
- the horse's show of courage when handling difficult situations, such as holding a cow that pushes exceptionally hard to return to the herd;
- overall eye appeal of the work;

Penalties that subtract from a score include:

- causing noticeable disturbance to the herd upon entering or during the work;
- failure to make a deep cut;
- using the back fence to turn a cow;
- rider quitting a cow while it is facing the horse and still in motion (illegal quit or hot quit);
- horse independently quitting a cow;
- allowing a cow to get back to the herd;
- rider reining, cueing or positioning the horse during a work;

A rider can be disqualified for using illegal equipment, leaving the working area before the time limit is reached, and for inhumane treatment of the horse. A western saddle is required. A breast collar and back cinch are optional. A bridle or hackamore is required. Riders must wear western wear, including a hat, though a safety helmet may be substituted. Martingales and tiedowns are prohibited. Brushing boots and back or skid boots are recommended for the horse's leg protection during competition. Chaps are not required but are recommended.

Competition divisions common in cutting are:

- Professional: "any person who has trained horses astride in any equine discipline cattle/cow events for direct or indirect remuneration or is a Hall of Fame equine trainer in any discipline shall be considered a professional by [the National Cutting Horse Association], with the exception of those who have been granted a change of status."
- Non-pro: "a person who has not received direct or indirect remuneration to work in any manner in the following activities on the premises of a cutting horse training operation: showing, training or assisting in training a cutting horse or cutting horse rider."
- Amateur: A rider with lifetime earnings less than $50,000 in cutting competition. They also cannot work for money at a horse training facility, nor can they be married to a professional trainer.
- Youth: Riders must be 18 years old or younger to compete as a youth.

== Competition circuit ==
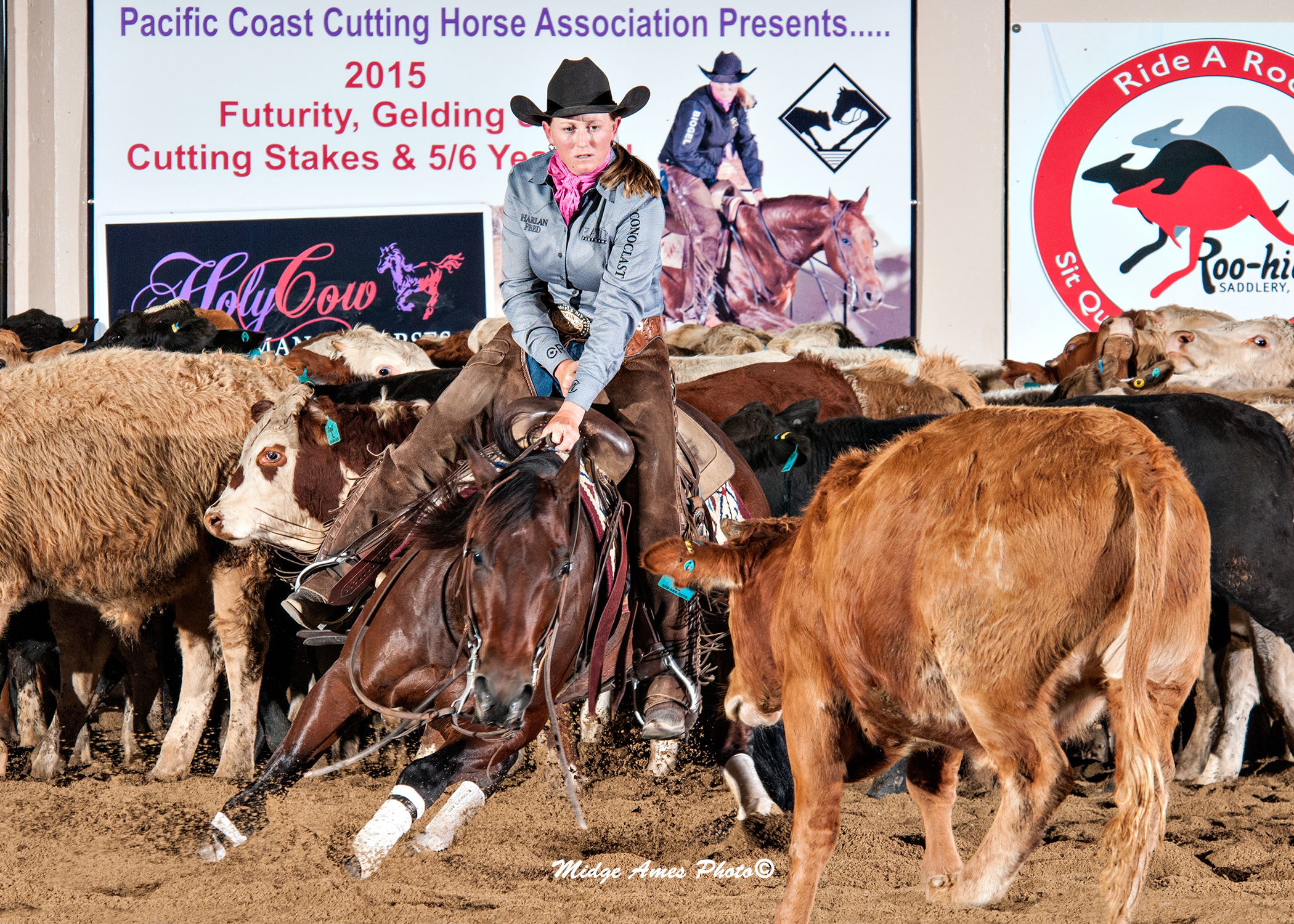
Futurity competition

Among the events drawing the most entrants are limited aged events, known as futurities, which offer large purses and added money in classes that offer competitors a chance to win hundreds of thousands of dollars, possibly millions.

Cutting's "Triple Crown" begins with the NCHA Futurity, an event limited to three-year-old horses. Following the Futurity is the NCHA Super Stakes, and the NCHA Derby for four-year-olds, usually held in conjunction with the Summer Spectacular. Five- and six-year-olds compete in the NCHA classic/challenge. There are also NCHA affiliates that host limited aged events that immediately follow the NCHA Futurity, such as the Pacific Coast Cutting Horse Association Futurity (PCCHA Futurity) held in Paso Robles, California, and the Augusta Futurity held in Augusta, Georgia. Events open to older, experienced horses offer classes with lifetime earning limits on the rider, including limited amateur and limited nonpro classes.

The NCHA also promotes weekend and circuit cutting events that are hosted by an NCHA affiliate or other entity. In order to be NCHA Open Championship Cutting classes, they must obtain approval from the NCHA, meet all NCHA standing rule requirements, and have an added purse of at least $200.00 per day.

== Terminology ==
- Area Work-Offs: The original name for the NCHA National Championships.
- Back fence: An area of the fence behind the cattle. A horse is penalized 3 points each time the cow being worked stops or turns within 3 feet (0.9 meters) of the back fence.
- Baldy: a cow with a large white marking or "bonnet" covering the face.
- Blow up: When a horse or cow panics.
- Brindle: A cow with a mottled coat color.
- Cheat: A horse that looks for an easy way out of working correctly.
- Collected: A horse that is balanced under the rider so that it can quickly respond to the moves of a cow.
- Commit: Show intention to work a specific cow by looking at it and stepping towards it.
- Cut for shape: When a rider selects a cow on the edge of the herd rather than riding through the herd and driving a cow out.
- Deep cut: To select a cow from well within the herd, not from the edge of the herd. Under NCHA rules, the cutter must make at least one deep cut per run.
- Draw cattle: A horse's ability to make cows look at them and come towards them.
- Drop on a cow: Crouching posture of the horse when a cow has been cut and separated and the rider drops his rein hand on the horse's neck.
- Dry work: Basic cutting horse training done without the use of cattle also known as flatwork.
- Frosted: a cow with white markings on the tips of the ears.
- Heading a cow: Occurs when a rider places a horse in front of a cow in order to stop the cow or to force it to change directions.
- Herd holder: One of two riders positioned on each side of the herd to help the cutter make his cut and to keep the herd grouped while the cutter works. They help to control the majority of the cattle so the rider can focus on the single cow they are trying to separate from the herd.
- Mott: A cow with multiple colors on the face.
- Sweep: The horse sits back on its rear end and moves its front end, front legs extended, with a cow.

== Organizations ==
The National Cutting Horse Association governs most cutting horse competition in the United States. They offer affiliate designation to clubs and organizations that meet NCHA affiliate guidelines. In 2015, there were 132 NCHA affiliates worldwide including the US, Australia, Brazil, Canada, Czech Republic, France, Germany, Italy, Netherlands, Sweden, and Switzerland.

NCHA-Australia is one such affiliate with 53 of its own designated affiliates throughout Australia. They host over 200 cutting horse competitions in Brisbane, Melbourne and at Sydney Royals. They also sponsor a 3 yr. old cutting futurity in May or June each year at the Australian Equine and Livestock Events Centre (AELEC), Tamworth, New South Wales.

The American Cutting Horse Association (ACHA) is an independent cutting horse association with its own established rules and regulations. They sponsor an annual aged event championship show in September which includes divisions for 3 yr. old, 4 yr. old, and 5 & 6 yr. old cutting horses. As of year-end 2015, the ACHA was not recognized as an NCHA affiliate, and has four affiliates of its own, including the South West Texas Cutting Horse Association, Belton, Texas, the South Texas Cutting Horse Association, Brenham, Texas, the American Western Sports Cutting Horse Association, Sulpher Springs, Texas, and the American Oklahoma Cutting Horse Association, Corn, Oklahoma.

== See also ==
- Campdrafting
- Ranch Sorting
- Team penning
- Working cow horse
