= Working cow horse =

Western-style equestrian competition event

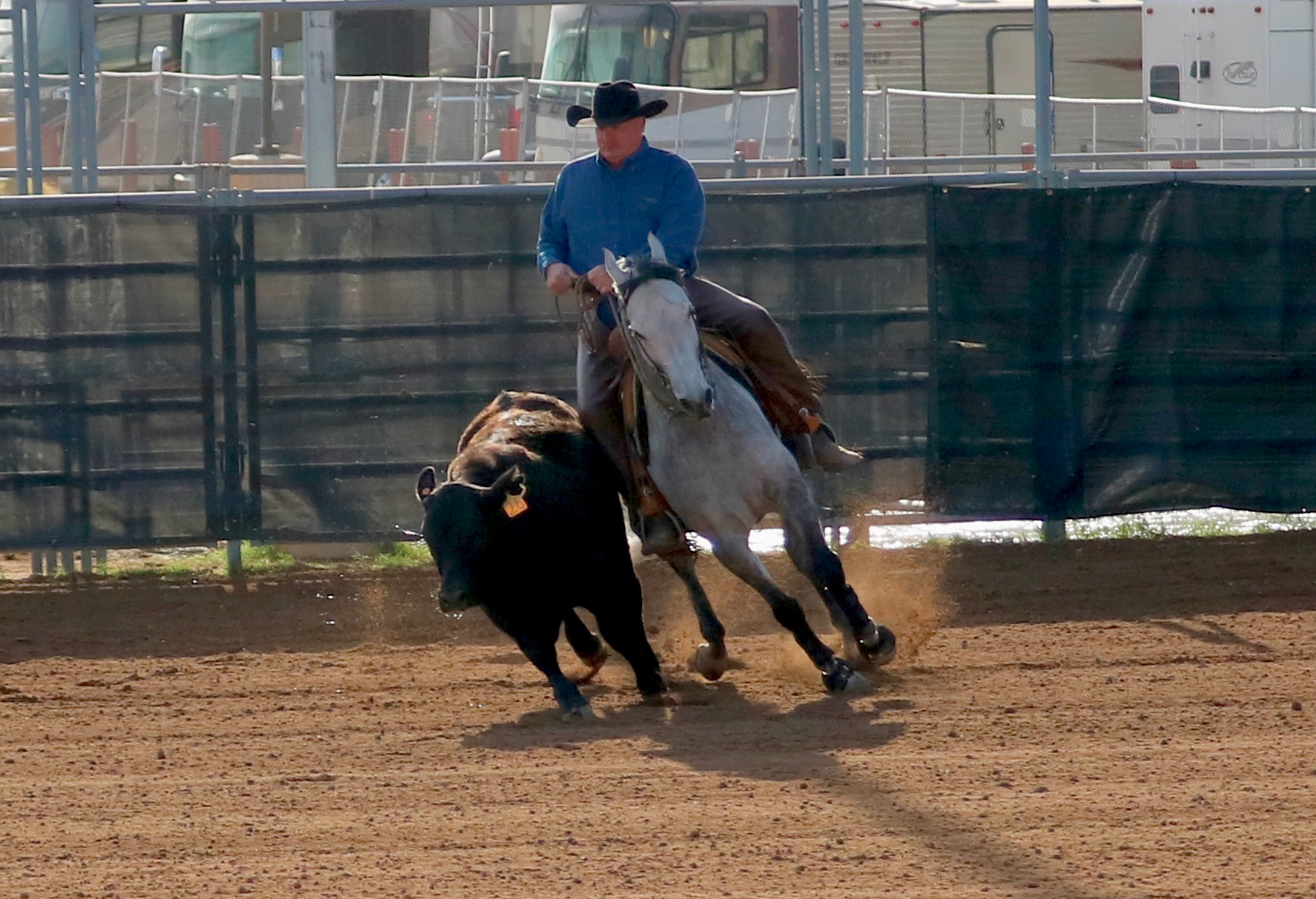
- Highest governing body: National Reined Cow Horse Association; European Reined Cow Horse Association

Characteristics
- Team members: no
- Mixed-sex: yes
- Type: cattle-herding competition

Presence
- Country or region: North America; Europe
- Olympic: no
- Paralympic: no

Working cow horse or reined cow horse is a type of Western riding competition in which horse and rider are tested for ability to work cattle. It is organised by the National Reined Cow Horse Association in North America, and by the European Reined Cow Horse Association in Europe. Horses are judged on accuracy, timing, and responsiveness.

== Competition ==
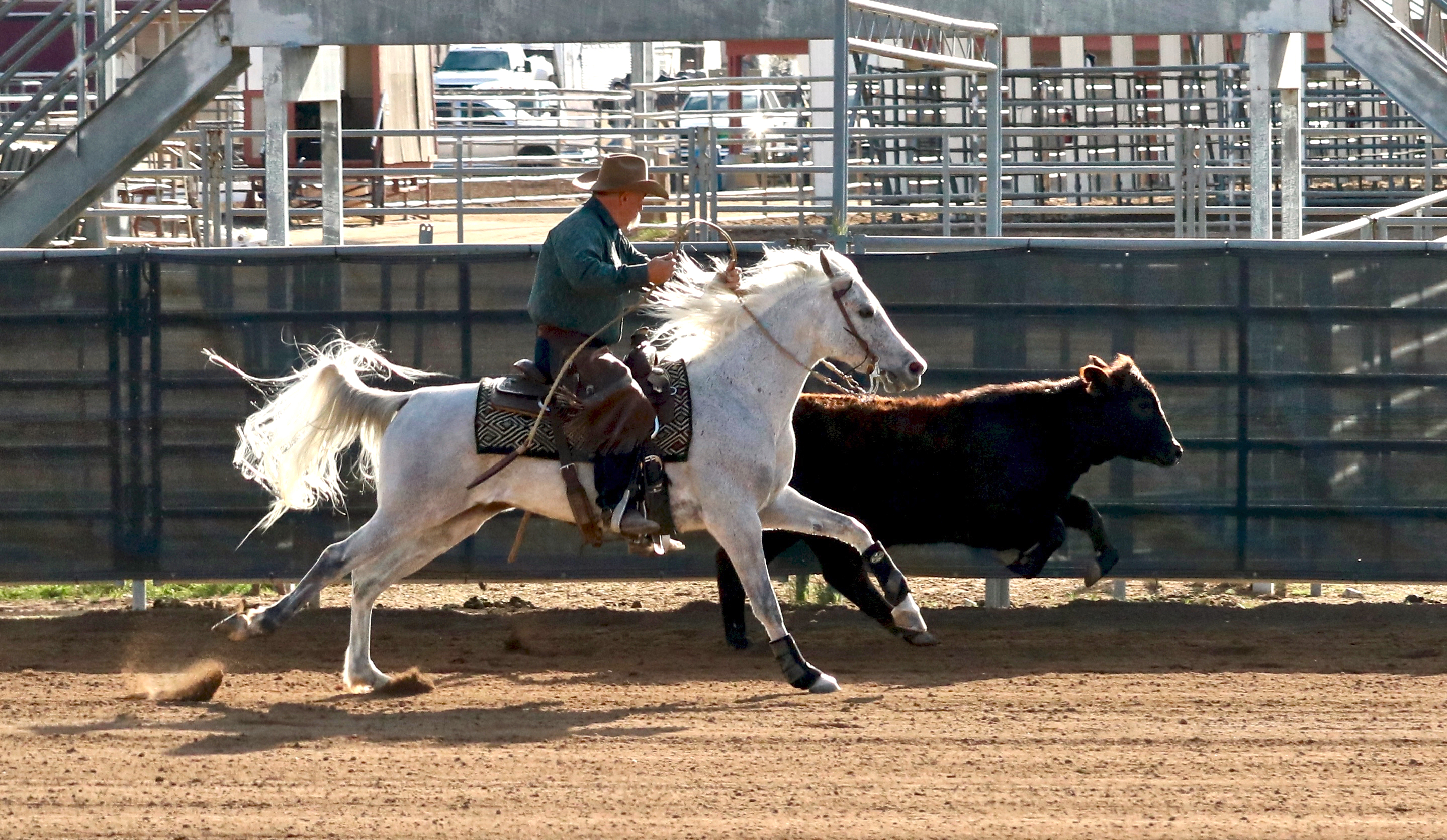
Arabian horse competing

Reined cow horse events which are "open" to all breeds and held by the National Reined Cow Horse Association (NRCHA). Working cow horse events are also held at breed specific shows, such as at an American Quarter Horse Association or Arabian Horse Association show, The general rules between various organizations are usually similar to the NRCHA in that the horse is required to perform two or three different sorts of work in one or two sessions. One session consists of reining work, where a reining pattern is performed. This is often referred to as the "dry work." The other is the cow work, where a single cow is released into the arena and the horse is asked to first hold the cow at one end of the arena (known as "boxing") then run the horse along the rail of the arena, turning it back without the aid of the fence (known as "fencing"). Lastly, the horse maneuvers the cow into the center of the arena and cause the cow to circle in a tight circle in each direction (known as "circling"). All this must be accomplished before the cow is exhausted. In three event competition, a "Herd Work" session is also included. The herd work is similar to cutting where a single cow is "cut" from a herd of cattle and prevented from returning to the herd by the intervention of the horse and rider. Herd work is most often included in three-year-old futurity and four- and five-year-old derby classes. Herd work is also included in a "Bridle Spectacular" class. (The Arabian Horse Association omits the reining work in its breed shows.) The horse is judged on the ability to control the cow, as well as speed, balance, responsiveness to the rider.

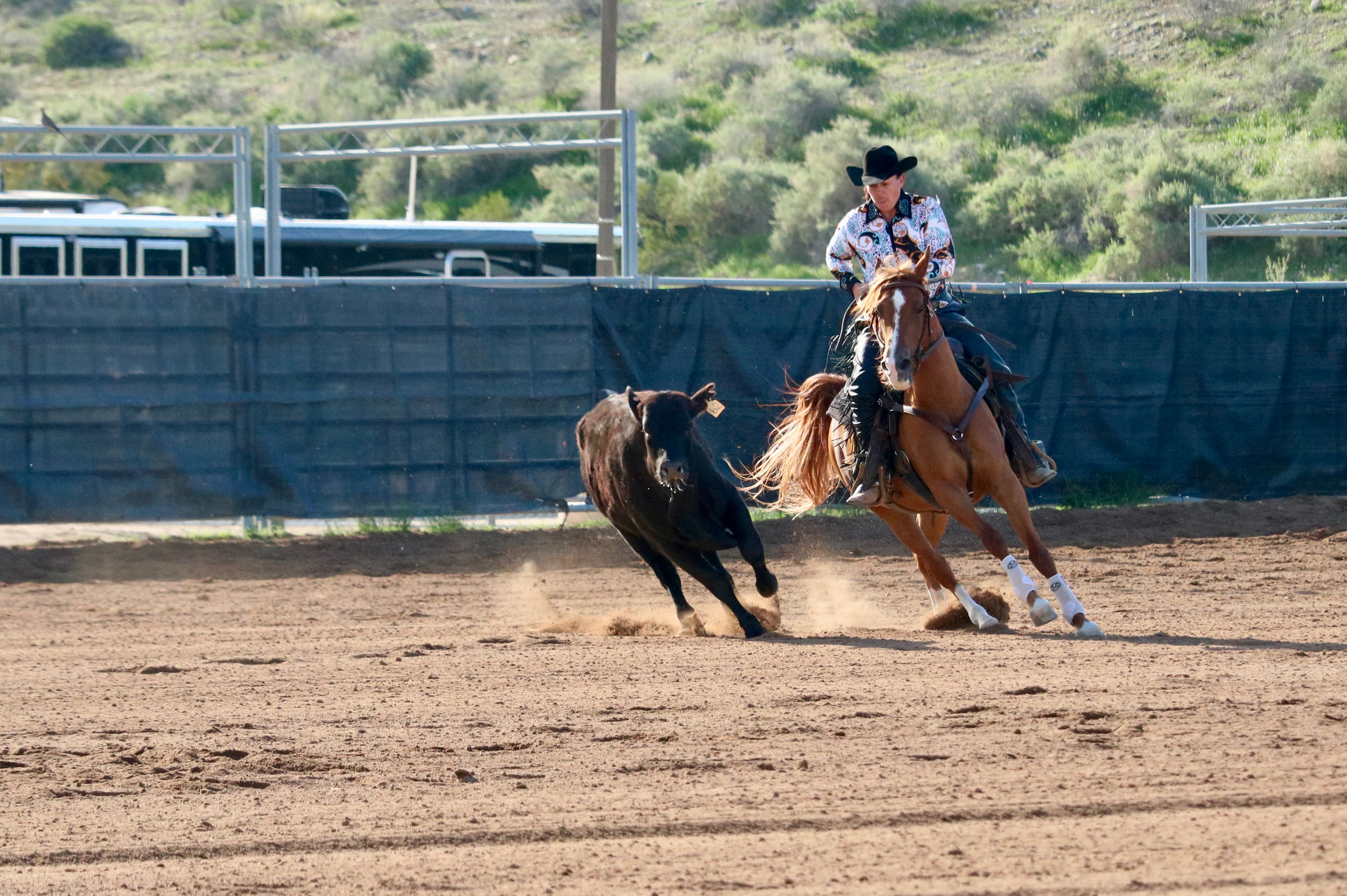
A young horse competing in a snaffle bit
