= List of halls and walks of fame =

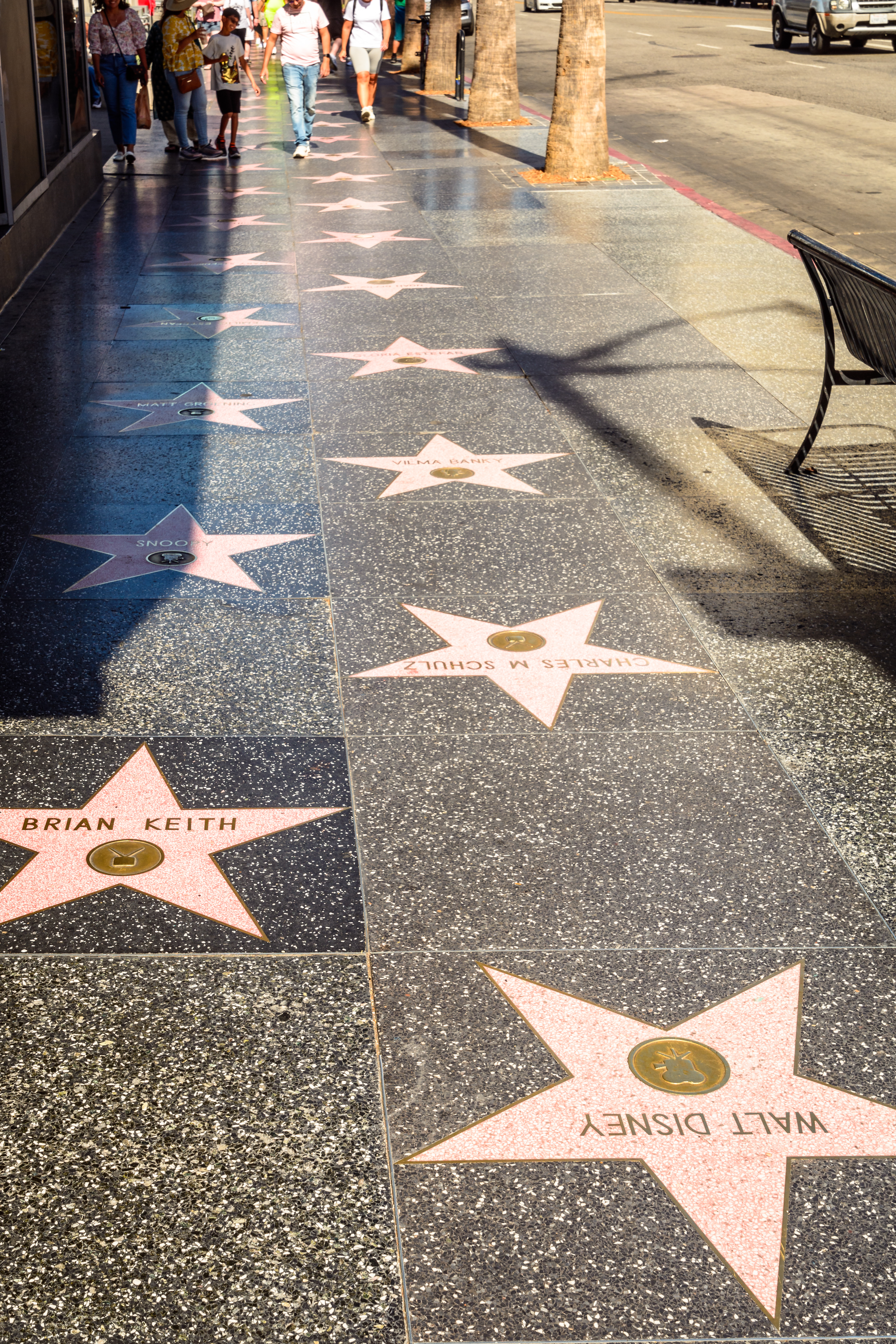
Hollywood Walk of Fame, Los Angeles, California, U.S.

A hall of fame, wall of fame, or walk of fame is a list of individuals, achievements, or other entities, usually chosen by a group of electors, to mark their excellence, accomplishments and fame in their field. In some cases, these halls of fame consist of actual halls or museums that enshrine the honorees with sculptures, plaques, and displays of memorabilia and general information regarding the inducted recipients. Sometimes, the honorees' plaques may instead be posted on a wall (hence a "wall of fame") or inscribed on a sidewalk (as in a "walk of fame", "walk of stars", or "avenue of fame"). In other cases, the hall of fame is more figurative and consists of a list of names of noteworthy people and their achievements and contributions. The lists are maintained by an organization or community, and may be national, state, local, or private.

== Etymology ==
The term "hall of fame" first appeared in German with the Ruhmeshalle, built in 1853 in Munich. The Walhalla memorial in Bavaria was conceived in 1807 and built between 1830 and 1842.

Inspired by the Ruhmeshalle, the English-language term was popularised in the United States by the Hall of Fame for Great Americans, a sculpture gallery dedicated in 1901. Located in the Bronx in New York City, it is on the campus of Bronx Community College (until 1973 the University Heights campus of New York University).

The meaning of fame has changed over the years, originally meaning 'renown' for achievement, as opposed to today's more common meaning of 'celebrity'.

== Halls of fame ==
=== Agriculture and livestock ===
- Agricultural Hall of Fame of Quebec
- Australian Stockman's Hall of Fame
- Canadian Agricultural Hall of Fame
- Hidalgo County Cattle Growers Association Hall of Fame
- National Agricultural Center and Hall of Fame
- Potato Hall of Fame

=== Arts ===
==== Culinary ====
- African American Chefs Hall of Fame
- American Academy of Chefs Culinary Hall of Fame
- Barbecue Hall of Fame
- Candy Hall of Fame
- Georgia Barbecue Hall of Fame
- Kansas City Barbeque Society Hall of Fame
- North Carolina Bar-B-Q Hall of Fame

==== Media and theater ====
- Alabama Stage and Screen Hall of Fame
- American Theater Hall of Fame
- American TV Game Show Hall of Fame
- Arkansas Entertainers Hall of Fame
- Art Directors Guild Hall of Fame
- Australian Media Hall of Fame
- Australian Television Logie Hall of Fame
- AVN Hall of Fame
- BC Entertainment Hall of Fame
- Black Filmmakers Hall of Fame
- Burlesque Hall of Fame
- Canadian Broadcast Hall of Fame
- Canadian Cartoonist Hall of Fame
- Canadian News Hall of Fame
- Circus Hall of Fame
- Disney Legends
- Georgia Newspaper Hall of Fame
- Georgia Radio Hall of Fame
- Hall of Great Western Performers
- International Clown Hall of Fame
- International Photography Hall of Fame and Museum
- Mascot Hall of Fame
- National Association of Black Journalists Hall of Fame
- National Museum of Dance and Hall of Fame
- OTO Award Hall of Fame
- Radio Hall of Fame
- The Southern Legends Entertainment & Performing Arts Hall of Fame
- Television Hall of Fame
- Texas Film Hall of Fame
- Transformers Hall of Fame
- XRCO Hall of Fame

==== Music ====
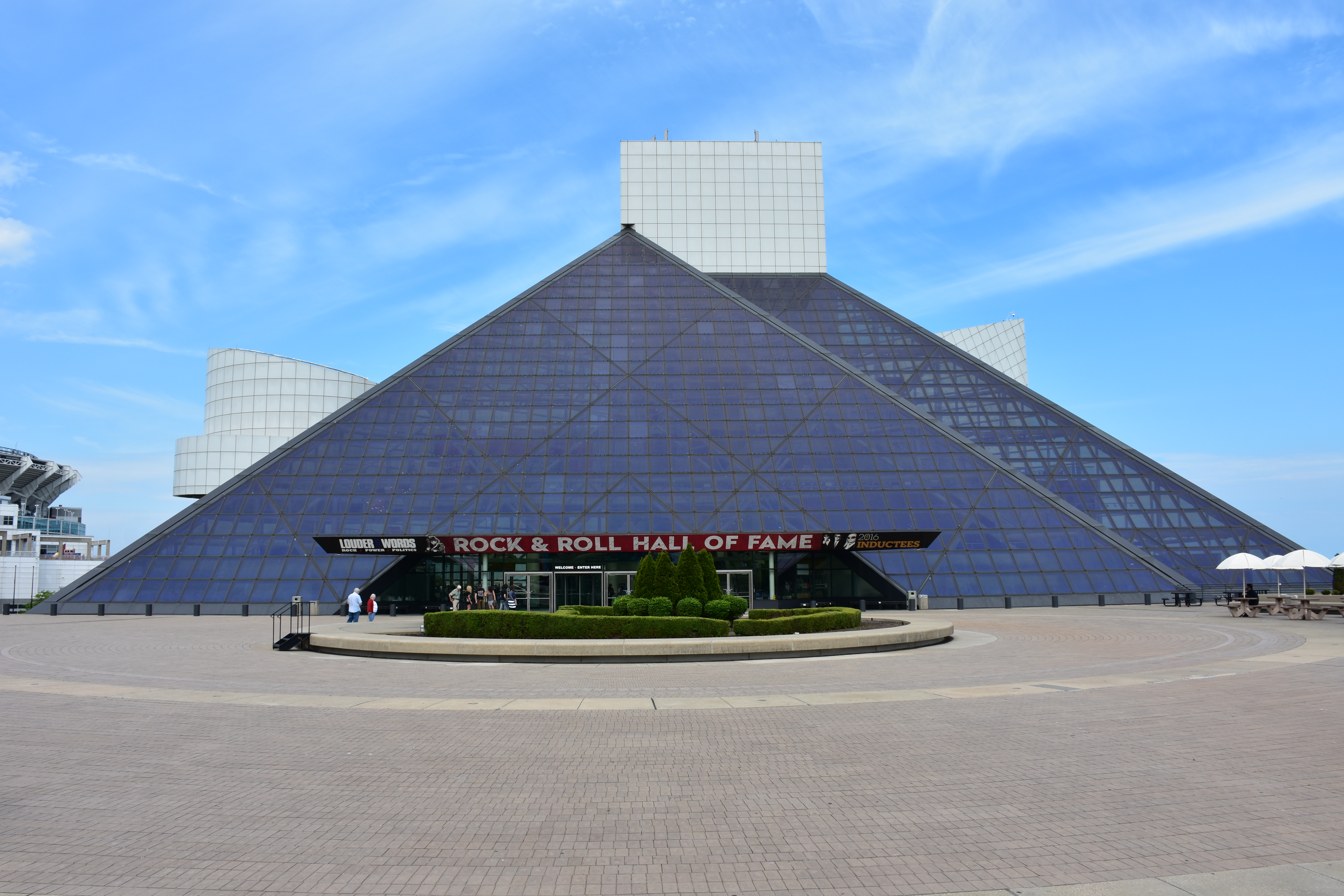
Rock and Roll Hall of Fame, Cleveland, Ohio, U.S.

- Alabama Jazz Hall of Fame
- Alabama Music Hall of Fame
- American Banjo Museum Hall of Fame
- American Classical Music Hall of Fame and Museum
- The Apollo Theatre Hall of Fame (New York City)
- Australian Recording Industry Hall of Fame
- Australian Roll of Renown
- Australian Songwriters Hall of Fame
- Beat Hall of Fame
- Big Band and Jazz Hall of Fame
- Billboard Latin Music Hall of Fame
- Blues Hall of Fame
- Brooklyn Jazz Hall of Fame and Museum
- Canadian Country Music Hall of Fame
- Canadian Music Hall of Fame
- Canadian Opera Hall of Fame
- Canadian Songwriters Hall of Fame
- Colorado Music Hall of Fame
- Country Music Hall of Fame
- Dance Music Hall of Fame
- Down Beat Jazz Hall of Fame
- Georgia Music Hall of Fame
- Gospel Music Hall of Fame
- Grammy Hall of Fame (for recordings)
- Grammy Lifetime Achievement Award (for people)
- Hawaiian Music Hall of Fame
- Hip Hop Hall of Fame
- Hit Parade Hall of Fame
- International Bluegrass Music Hall of Fame
- International Latin Music Hall of Fame
- International Polka Music Hall of Fame
- Iowa Rock 'n' Roll Hall of Fame
- Irish Music Hall of Fame
- Latin Grammy Hall of Fame (for recordings)
- Latin Songwriters Hall of Fame
- Long Island Music Hall of Fame
- Louisiana Music Hall of Fame
- Metal Hall of Fame
- Memphis Music Hall of Fame
- Minnesota Music Hall of Fame
- Mississippi Musicians Hall of Fame
- Musicians Hall of Fame and Museum
- Nashville Songwriters Hall of Fame
- New Jersey Music Hall of Fame
- New Zealand Music Hall of Fame
- North Carolina Music Hall of Fame
- Oklahoma Jazz Hall of Fame
- Oklahoma Music Hall of Fame
- Omaha Black Music Hall of Fame
- Oregon Music Hall of Fame
- Polka Hall of Fame
- Rhythm and Blues Music Hall of Fame
- Rockabilly Hall of Fame
- Rock and Roll Hall of Fame
- Songwriters Hall of Fame
- Southern Gospel Museum and Hall of Fame
- Steel Guitar Hall of Fame
- Swedish Music Hall of Fame
- Tejano Roots Hall of Fame
- Texas Country Music Hall of Fame
- Texas Gospel Music Hall of Fame
- UK Music Hall of Fame
- Vocal Group Hall of Fame
- West Virginia Music Hall of Fame
- Western Music Association Hall of Fame
- Women Songwriters Hall of Fame

==== Writing ====
- Colorado Authors Hall of Fame
- First Fandom Hall of Fame award
- Georgia Writers Hall of Fame
- Kentucky Writers Hall of Fame
- Missouri Writers Hall of Fame
- National Literary Hall of Fame for Writers of African Descent
- Nevada Writers Hall of Fame
- New York State Writers Hall of Fame
- North Carolina Literary Hall of Fame
- Prometheus Award Hall of Fame
- Romance Writers of America Hall of Fame
- Science Fiction and Fantasy Hall of Fame
- Will Eisner Award Hall of Fame

==== Other ====
- International Best Dressed Hall of Fame List
- Quilters Hall of Fame

=== Business ===
==== General ====
- Canadian Business Hall of Fame
- Connecticut Business Hall of Fame
- Kansas Business Hall of Fame
- Queensland Business Leaders Hall of Fame
- U.S. Business Hall of Fame

==== Marketing and advertising ====
- American Advertising Federation Hall of Fame
- Marketing Hall of Fame

==== Mining ====
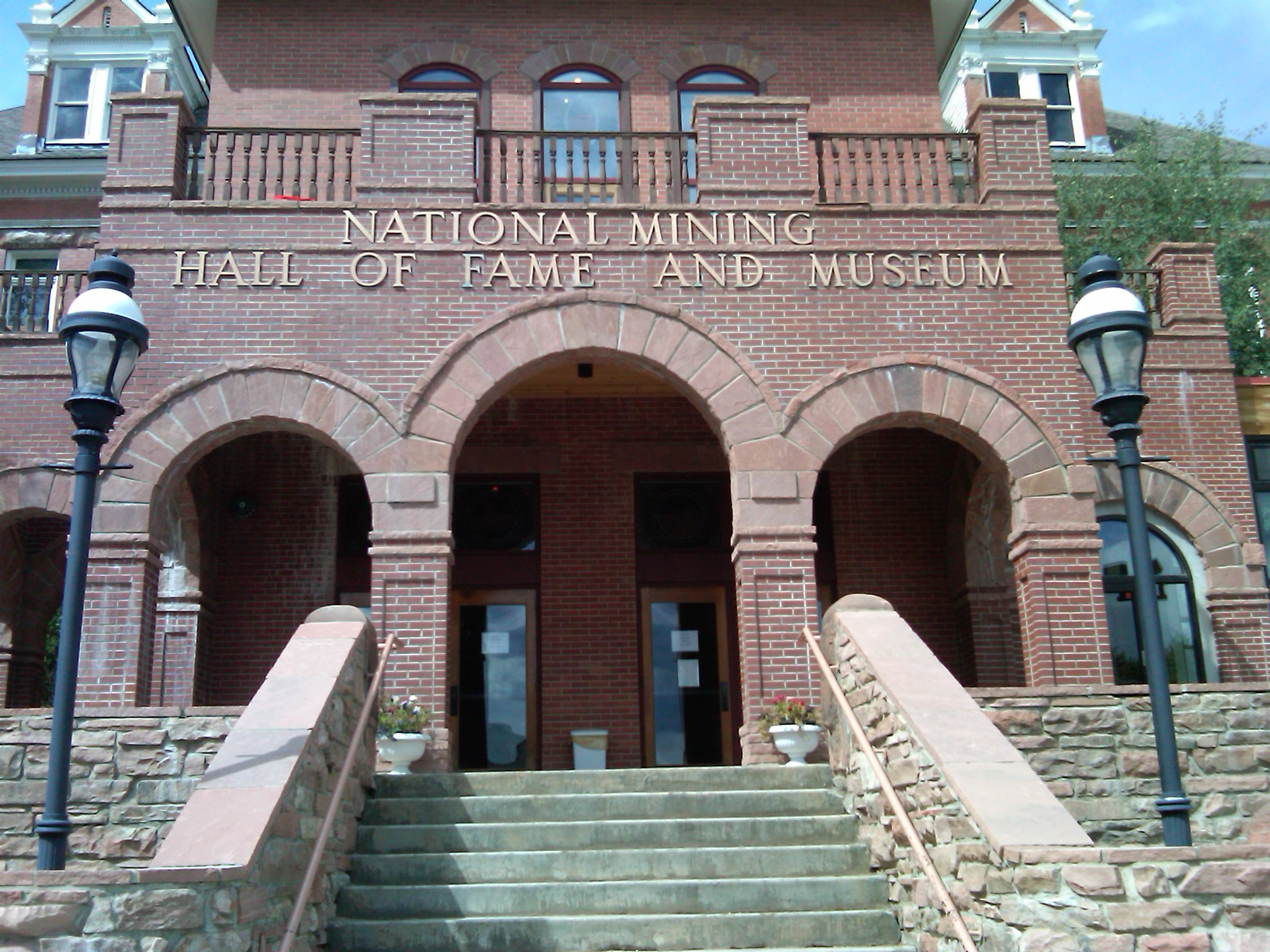
National Mining Hall of Fame, Leadville, Colorado, U.S.

- Australian Prospectors & Miners' Hall of Fame
- Canadian Mining Hall of Fame
- National Mining Hall of Fame

==== Other ====
- Accounting Hall of Fame
- Gaming Hall of Fame
- Insurance Hall of Fame
- Sporting Goods Industry Hall of Fame

=== Civil rights ===
- Florida Civil Rights Hall of Fame
- National Abolition Hall of Fame and Museum
- Panthéon

=== Cowboy and rodeo ===
- Australian Stockman's Hall of Fame
- Bull Riding Hall of Fame
- California Rodeo Salinas Hall of Fame
- Canadian Pro Rodeo Hall of Fame
- Cheyenne Frontier Days Old West Museum
- Ellensburg Rodeo Hall of Fame
- Idaho Rodeo Hall of Fame
- Indian National Finals Rodeo Hall of Fame
- Kansas Cowboy Hall of Fame
- Montana Cowboy Hall of Fame
- National Cowgirl Museum and Hall of Fame
- National Multicultural Western Heritage Museum
- National Rodeo Hall of Fame
- North Dakota Cowboy Hall of Fame
- Pendleton Round-Up and Happy Canyon Hall of Fame
- Professional Bull Riders: Heroes and Legends
- ProRodeo Hall of Fame
- Rex Allen Arizona Cowboy Museum and Willcox Cowboy Hall of Fame
- Rodeo Hall of Fame
- St. Paul Rodeo Hall of Fame
- Texas Cowboy Hall of Fame
- Texas Rodeo Cowboy Hall of Fame
- Texas Rodeo Hall of Fame
- Texas Trail of Fame
- Utah Cowboy and Western Heritage Museum
- Western Heritage Museum & Lea County Cowboy Hall of Fame
- Wyoming Cowboy Hall of Fame

=== Education ===
- International Adult and Continuing Education Hall of Fame
- National High School Hall of Fame
- National Teachers Hall of Fame

=== LGBT ===
- Chicago LGBT Hall of Fame
- LGBTQ Sports Hall of Fame
- Q Hall of Fame

=== Military and first responder ===
- American Police Hall of Fame & Museum
- Military Intelligence Hall of Fame
- Quartermaster Hall of Fame
- Texas Ranger Hall of Fame

=== Science and technology ===
==== Aviation and space ====
- Arizona Aviation Hall of Fame
- Arkansas Aviation Hall of Fame
- Aviation Hall of Fame and Museum of New Jersey
- Canada's Aviation Hall of Fame
- Colorado Aviation Hall of Fame
- Empire State Aviation Hall of Fame
- Georgia Aviation Hall of Fame
- International Air & Space Hall of Fame
- International Space Hall of Fame
- Iowa Aviation Hall of Fame
- Iranian Science and Culture Hall of Fame
- Minnesota Aviation Hall of Fame
- National Aviation Hall of Fame
- Naval Aviation Hall of Honor
- North Carolina Aviation Hall of Fame
- South Dakota Aviation Hall of Fame
- Space Camp Hall of Fame
- Texas Aviation Hall of Fame
- United States Astronaut Hall of Fame
- Utah Aviation Hall of Fame
- Women in Aviation International Pioneer Hall of Fame

==== Maritime ====
- American Sailboat Hall of Fame
- Australian Sailing Hall of Fame
- International Maritime Hall of Fame
- ISAF Sailing Hall of Fame
- National Maritime Hall of Fame

==== Medical ====
- American Nurses Association Hall of Fame
- Canadian Medical Hall of Fame

==== Motor vehicle ====
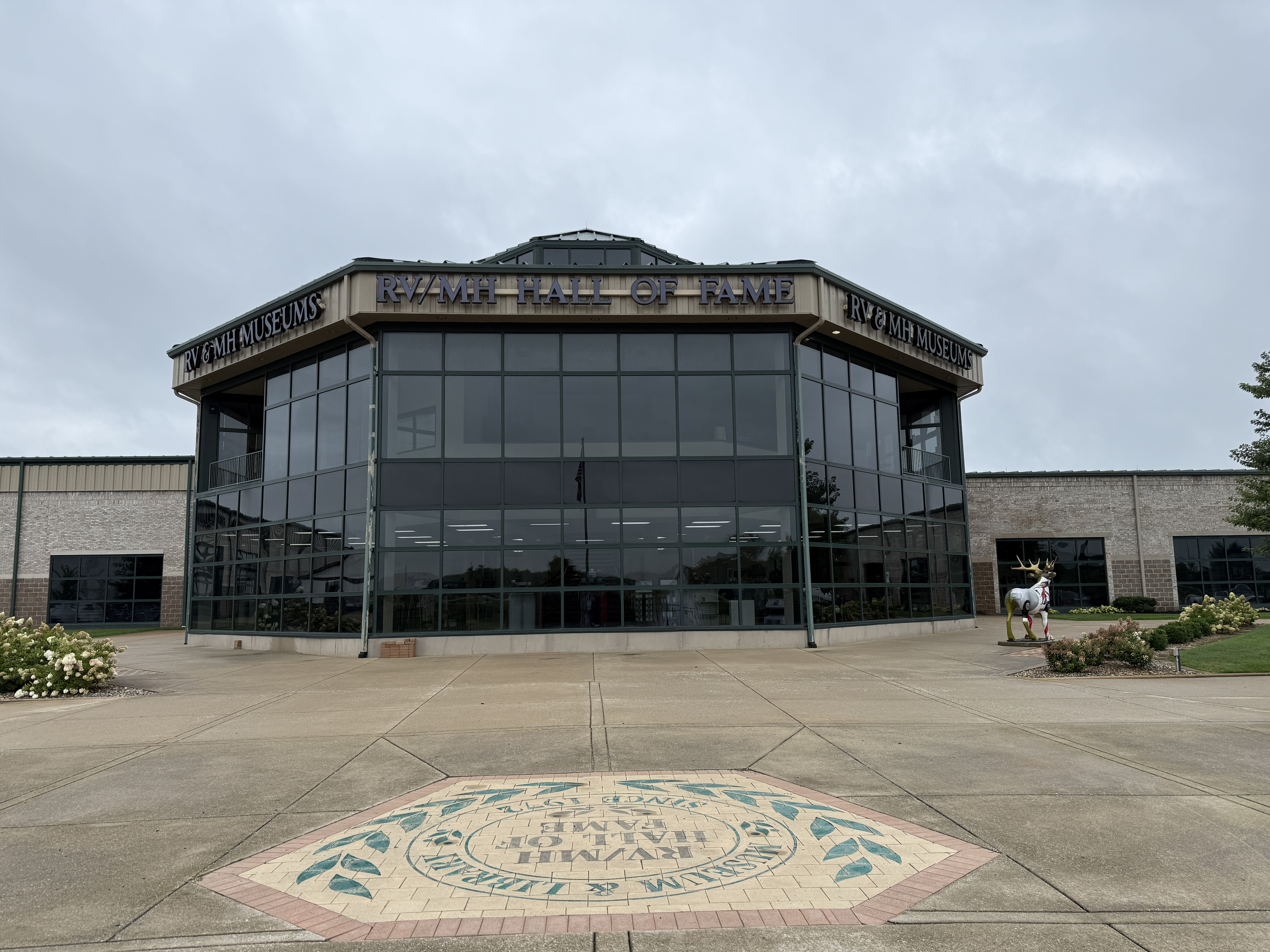
RV/MH Hall of Fame, Elkhart, Indiana, U.S.

- Automotive Hall of Fame
- Corvette Hall of Fame
- Japan Automotive Hall of Fame
- Model Car Hall of Fame
- Motorcycle Hall of Fame
- National Road Transport Hall of Fame
- RV/MH Hall of Fame
- Sturgis Motorcycle Museum & Hall of Fame

==== Rail ====
- National Railroad Hall of Fame
- National Railroad Museum and Hall of Fame
- North America Railway Hall of Fame

==== Other ====
- Academy of Interactive Arts and Sciences' Hall of Fame
- Canadian Science and Engineering Hall of Fame
- Consumer Electronics Hall of Fame
- Florida Inventors Hall of Fame
- Internet Hall of Fame
- International Rubber Science Hall of Fame
- Korea Science and Technology Hall of Fame
- National Cyber Security Hall of Fame
- National Inventors Hall of Fame
- New Jersey Inventors Hall of Fame
- Robot Hall of Fame
- Scottish Engineering Hall of Fame
- Women in Science Hall of Fame

=== Sports and games ===
==== Multiple sports ====
- Aboriginal and Islander Sports Hall of Fame
- ACT Sport Hall of Fame
- Alabama Sports Hall of Fame
- Alaska Sports Hall of Fame
- Alberta Sports Hall of Fame
- American Indian Athletic Hall of Fame
- Arizona Sports Hall of Fame
- Arkansas Sports Hall of Fame
- Bay Area Sports Hall of Fame
- BC Sports Hall of Fame
- California Sports Hall of Fame
- Canadian Black Belt Hall of Fame
- Canadian Olympic Hall of Fame
- Canada's Sports Hall of Fame
- Chicagoland Sports Hall of Fame
- Colorado Sports Hall of Fame
- Delaware Sports Museum and Hall of Fame
- England Athletics Hall of Fame
- FIDAL Hall of Fame
- Florida Sports Hall of Fame
- Georgia Sports Hall of Fame
- Germany's Sports Hall of Fame
- Gothenburg Sports Hall of Fame
- Greater Cleveland Sports Hall of Fame
- Hawaii Sports Hall of Fame
- Houston Sports Hall of Fame
- Idaho Athletic Hall of Fame
- Indiana Sports Hall of Fame
- International Jewish Sports Hall of Fame
- International Women's Sports Hall of Fame
- Iowa Sports Hall of Fame
- Kansas Sports Hall of Fame
- Kentucky Athletic Hall of Fame
- Kingston and District Sports Hall of Fame
- LGBTQ Sports Hall of Fame
- London Youth Games Hall of Fame
- Louisiana Sports Hall of Fame
- Maine Sports Hall of Fame
- Manitoba Sports Hall of Fame and Museum
- Maryland State Athletic Hall of Fame
- Michigan Sports Hall of Fame
- Mississippi Sports Hall of Fame
- Missouri Sports Hall of Fame
- National Italian American Sports Hall of Fame
- National Jewish Sports Hall of Fame and Museum
- National Polish-American Sports Hall of Fame
- National Sports Hall of Fame
- New Brunswick Sports Hall of Fame
- New Mexico Sports Hall of Fame
- New Zealand Coaches Hall of Fame
- North Carolina Sports Hall of Fame
- North Dakota Sports Hall of Fame
- Northwestern Ontario Sports Hall of Fame
- Nova Scotia Sport Hall of Fame
- Oklahoma Sports Hall of Fame
- Ontario Sports Hall of Fame
- Oregon Sports Hall of Fame
- Ottawa Sport Hall of Fame
- Paralympic Hall of Fame
- Pennsylvania Sports Hall of Fame
- Philadelphia Jewish Sports Hall of Fame
- Philadelphia Sports Hall of Fame
- Rhode Island Heritage Hall of Fame
- Slovenian Athletes Hall of Fame
- Southern California Jewish Sports Hall of Fame
- South Carolina Athletic Hall of Fame
- South Dakota Sports Hall of Fame
- Sport Australia Hall of Fame Awards
- Sports Hall of Fame of New Jersey
- Sports Hall of Fame Suriname
- State of Washington Sports Hall of Fame
- Staten Island Sports Hall of Fame
- Tennessee Sports Hall of Fame
- Texas Sports Hall of Fame
- United States Olympic & Paralympic Hall of Fame
- Utah Sports Hall of Fame
- Vermont Sports Hall of Fame
- Virginia Sports Hall of Fame and Museum
- Washington DC Sports Hall of Fame
- West Virginia Sports Hall of Fame
- Western Australian Hall of Champions
- Wisconsin Athletic Hall of Fame
- Women's Sports Hall of Fame

==== Aquatics ====
- Aquatic Hall of Fame and Museum of Canada
- International Swimming Hall of Fame
- Swimming Australia Hall of Fame
- USA Water Polo Hall of Fame
- Water Polo Australia Hall of Fame
- Water Ski Hall of Fame and Museum

==== Association football ====
- AS Roma Hall of Fame
- ACF Fiorentina Hall of Fame
- Asian Football Hall of Fame
- Brazilian Football Museum Hall of Fame
- Brentford F.C. Hall of Fame
- Canada Soccer Hall of Fame
- D.C. United Hall of Tradition
- English Football Hall of Fame
- Finnish Football Hall of Fame
- Football Australia Hall of Fame
- Football Federation Australia Hall of Fame
- Football Hall of Fame Western Australia
- Gwladys Street's Hall of Fame
- Inter Milan Hall of Fame
- Ipswich Town F.C. Hall of Fame
- Israeli Football Hall of Fame
- Italian Football Hall of Fame
- National Soccer Hall of Fame
- Norwich City F.C. Hall of Fame
- Premier League Hall of Fame
- Scottish Football Hall of Fame
- St. Louis Soccer Hall of Fame
- Sydney FC Hall of Fame
- Torino FC Hall of Fame
- U.S. Soccer Hall of Fame
- United Soccer Coaches Hall of Fame
- WSL Hall of Fame

==== Australian rules football ====
- Australian Football Hall of Fame
- East Fremantle Football Club Hall of Fame
- Fremantle Football Hall of Legends
- Queensland Football Hall of Fame
- South Australian Football Hall of Fame
- South Fremantle Football Club Hall of Fame
- Tasmanian Football Hall of Fame
- West Australian Football Hall of Fame

==== Baseball and softball ====
- American Baseball Coaches Association Hall of Fame
- Angels Hall of Fame
- Baltimore Orioles Hall of Fame
- Babe Ruth League Hall of Fame
- Baseball Australia Hall of Fame
- Boston Red Sox Hall of Fame
- Braves Hall of Fame
- Buffalo Baseball Hall of Fame
- California League Hall of Fame
- Canadian Baseball Hall of Fame
- Caribbean Baseball Hall of Fame
- Chicago Cubs Hall of Fame
- Cincinnati Reds Hall of Fame and Museum
- Cleveland Guardians Hall of Fame
- Congressional Baseball Hall of Fame
- Cuban Baseball Hall of Fame
- Florida State League Hall of Fame
- International League Hall of Fame
- International Softball Federation Hall of Fame
- Japanese Baseball Hall of Fame
- Legends of Dodger Baseball
- Mexican Professional Baseball Hall of Fame
- Minnesota Twins Hall of Fame
- Montreal Expos Hall of Fame
- NABA Hall of Fame
- National Baseball Hall of Fame and Museum
- National College Baseball Hall of Fame
- National Fastpitch Coaches Association Hall of Fame
- National Softball Hall of Fame
- New York Mets Hall of Fame
- New York State Baseball Hall of Fame
- Pacific Coast League Hall of Fame
- San Diego Padres Hall of Fame
- Seattle Mariners Hall of Fame
- South Dakota Amateur Baseball Hall of Fame
- St. Louis Cardinals Hall of Fame and Museum
- Tampa Bay Rays Hall of Fame
- Texas League Hall of Fame
- Texas Rangers Hall of Fame
- Venezuelan Baseball Hall of Fame and Museum

==== Basketball ====
- Australian Basketball Hall of Fame
- EuroLeague Hall of Fame
- FIBA Hall of Fame
- Finnish Basketball Hall of Fame
- French Basketball Hall of Fame
- Greek Basketball League Hall of Fame
- Indiana Basketball Hall of Fame
- Italian Basketball Hall of Fame
- Philippine Basketball Association Hall of Fame
- Naismith Basketball Hall of Fame
- National Collegiate Basketball Hall of Fame
- NYC Basketball Hall of Fame
- VTB United League Hall of Fame
- Women's Basketball Hall of Fame

==== Board and card games ====
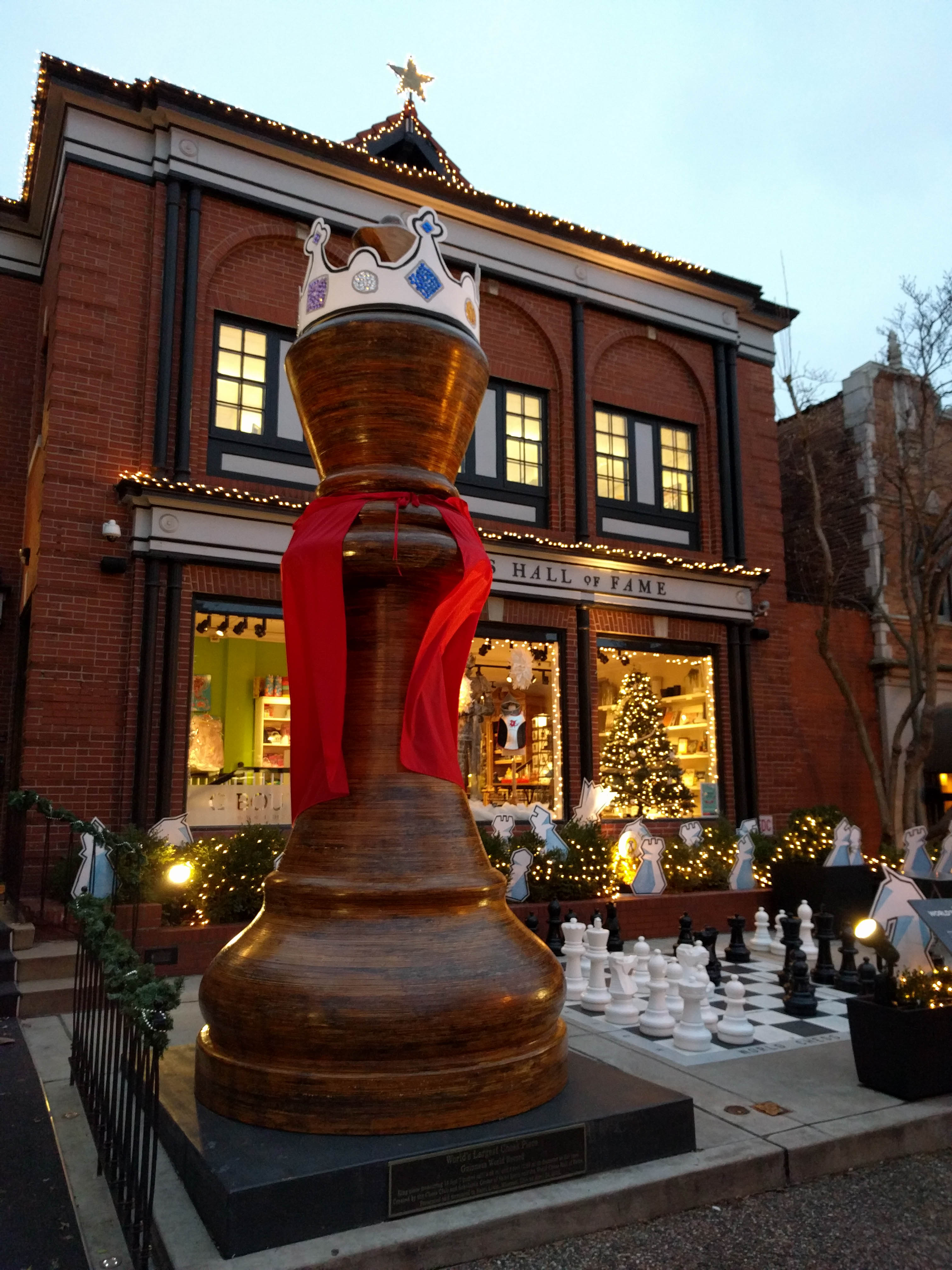
World Chess Hall of Fame, St. Louis, Missouri, U.S.

- ACBL Hall of Fame
- Blackjack Hall of Fame
- Charles Roberts Awards Hall of Fame
- Magic: The Gathering Hall of Fame
- Nihon Ki-in Hall of Fame
- Poker Hall of Fame
- World Chess Hall of Fame

==== Bowling ====
- International Bowling Hall of Fame
- United States Bowling Congress Hall of Fame

==== Boxing ====
- Australian National Boxing Hall of Fame
- Bare Knuckle Boxing Hall of Fame
- International Boxing Hall of Fame
- International Women's Boxing Hall of Fame
- Minnesota Boxing Hall of Fame
- Nevada Boxing Hall of Fame
- Pennsylvania Boxing Hall of Fame
- Ring 8 and New York State Boxing Hall of Fame

==== Cricket ====
- Australian Cricket Hall of Fame
- Bradman Museum & International Cricket Hall of Fame
- Cricket Hall of Fame
- ICC Cricket Hall of Fame
- Pakistan Cricket Hall Of Fame

==== Cycling ====
- British Cycling Hall of Fame
- Cycling Australia Hall of Fame
- Mountain Bike Hall of Fame
- Union Cycliste Internationale Hall of Fame
- United States Bicycling Hall of Fame
- VPCC Cycling Hall of Fame

==== Esports ====
- League of Legends - Hall of Legends
- Counter-Strike - HLTV Hall of Fame

==== Equestrian ====
- Aiken Thoroughbred Racing Hall of Fame and Museum
- American Quarter Horse Hall of Fame
- Australian Racing Hall of Fame
- The British Horse Society Equestrian Hall of Fame
- British Horseracing Hall of Fame
- British Steeplechasing Hall of Fame
- Calder Race Course Hall of Fame
- Canadian Horse Racing Hall of Fame
- Fair Grounds Racing Hall of Fame
- Harness Racing Museum & Hall of Fame
- Inter Dominion Hall of Fame
- Japan Racing Association Hall of Fame
- Korea Racing Authority Equine Museum
- Michigan Quarter Horse Association Hall of Fame
- National Museum of Racing and Hall of Fame
- National Reined Cow Horse Association Hall of Fame
- National Reining Horse Association Hall of Fame
- National Snaffle Bit Association Hall of Fame
- NCHA Horse Hall of Fame
- NCHA Members Hall of Fame
- NCHA Rider Hall of Fame
- New Zealand Racing Hall of Fame
- New Zealand Trotting Hall of Fame
- Polo Hall of Fame
- United States Show Jumping Hall of Fame

==== Fishing ====
- IGFA Fishing Hall of Fame
- National Fresh Water Fishing Hall of Fame

==== Fitness, weightlifting, and bodybuilding ====
- International Fitness and Bodybuilding Federation Hall of Fame
- National Fitness Hall of Fame
- USA Weightlifting Hall of Fame

==== Flying disc games ====
- Disc Golf Hall of Fame
- USA Ultimate Hall of Fame

==== Golf ====
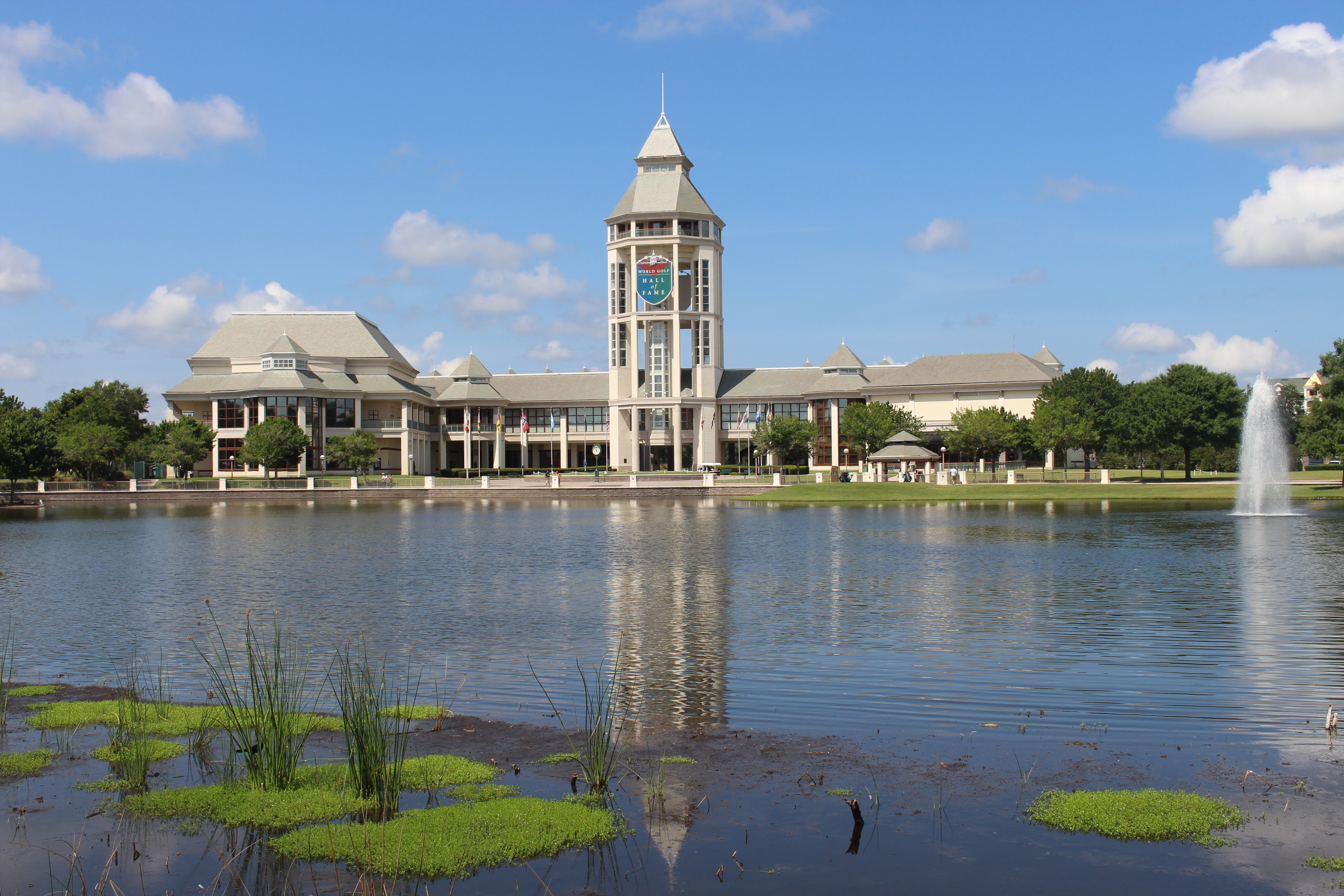
World Golf Hall of Fame, Pinehurst, North Carolina, U.S.

- Caddie Hall of Fame
- Canadian Golf Hall of Fame
- Connecticut Golf Hall of Fame
- GCAA Hall of Fame
- National Black Golf Hall of Fame
- Tennessee Golf Hall of Fame
- Wisconsin Golf Hall of Fame
- World Golf Hall of Fame

==== Gridiron football ====
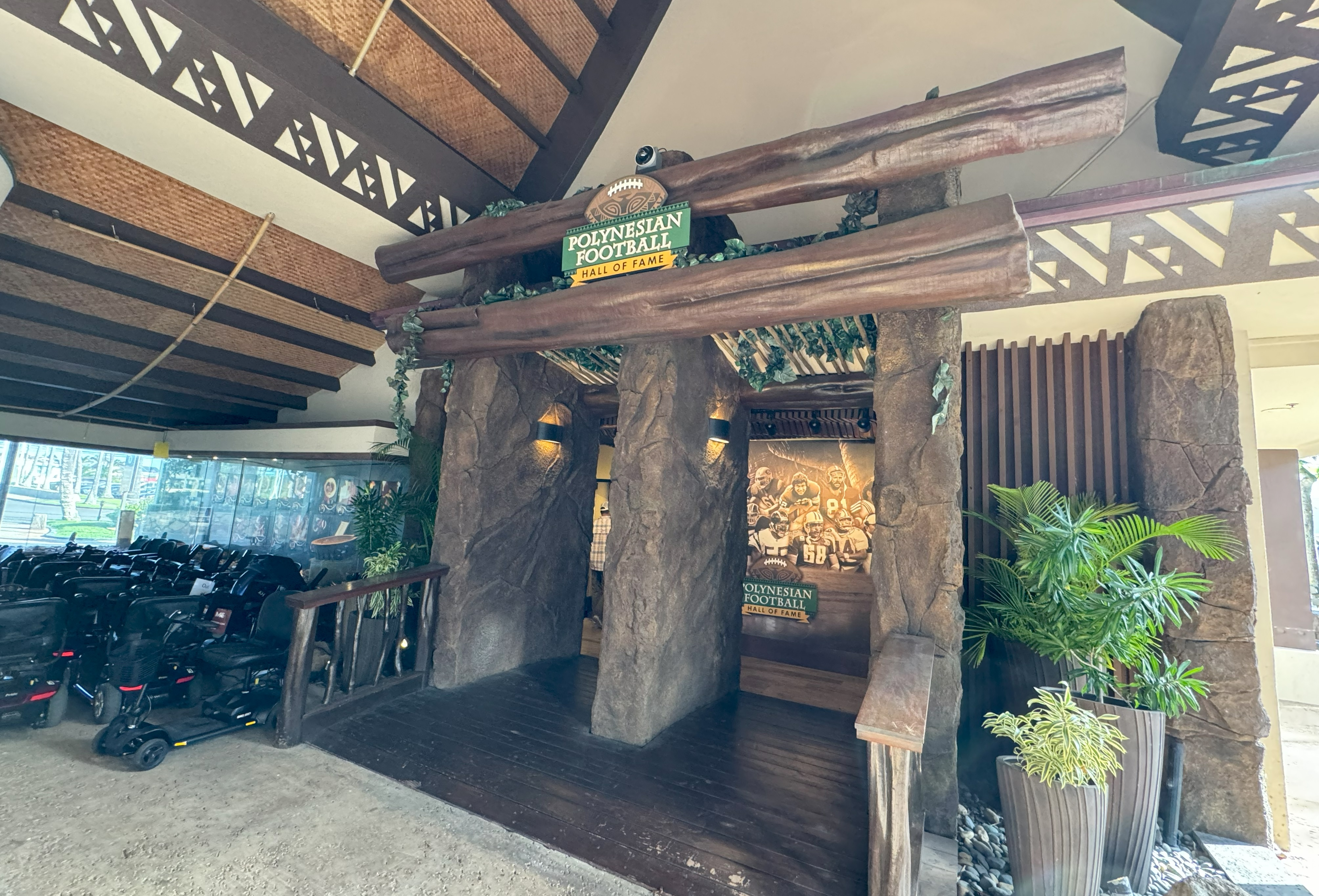
Polynesian Football Hall of Fame, Oahu, Hawaii, U.S.

- American Football Kicking Hall of Fame
- Arena Football Hall of Fame
- Canadian Football Hall of Fame
- College Football Hall of Fame
- Green Bay Packers Hall of Fame
- Helms Pro Football Hall of Fame
- Los Angeles Chargers Hall of Fame
- Indiana Football Hall of Fame
- New England Patriots Hall of Fame
- Polynesian Football Hall of Fame
- Pro Football Hall of Fame
- South Carolina Football Hall of Fame

==== Ice hockey ====
- AHL Hall of Fame
- ECHL Hall of Fame
- Finnish Hockey Hall of Fame
- French Ice Hockey Hall of Fame
- German Ice Hockey Hall of Fame
- Hockey Hall of Fame
- IIHF Hall of Fame
- Manitoba Hockey Hall of Fame
- Original Hockey Hall of Fame
- Phantoms Hall of Fame
- Philadelphia Flyers Hall of Fame
- Slovak Hockey Hall of Fame
- Slovenian Hockey Hall of Fame
- Swedish Bandy Hall of Fame
- Swedish Hockey Hall of Fame
- United States Hockey Hall of Fame
- Wisconsin Hockey Hall of Fame
- World Hockey Association Hall of Fame

==== Lacrosse ====
- Australian Lacrosse Hall of Fame
- Canadian Lacrosse Hall of Fame
- National Lacrosse Hall of Fame and Museum
- National Lacrosse League Hall of Fame
- Professional Lacrosse Hall of Fame

==== Martial arts ====
- Australasian Martial Arts Hall of Fame
- UFC Hall of Fame
- World Tae Kwon Do Federation Hall of Fame

==== Motorsports ====
- Australian Motor Sport Hall of Fame
- Australian Speedway Hall of Fame
- Canadian Motorsport Hall of Fame
- FIA Hall of Fame
- MotoGP Hall of Fame
- Indianapolis Motor Speedway Hall of Fame Museum
- International Monster Truck Hall of Fame
- International Motorsports Hall of Fame
- Michigan Motor Sports Hall of Fame
- Motorcycle Hall of Fame
- Motorsports Hall of Fame of America
- NASCAR Hall of Fame
- National Dirt Late Model Hall of Fame
- National Midget Auto Racing Hall of Fame
- National Museum of Racing and Hall of Fame
- National Sprint Car Hall of Fame
- New England Auto Racers Hall of Fame
- Northeast Dirt Modified Hall of Fame
- Off-Road Motorsports Hall of Fame
- Rally Hall of Fame
- SCCA Hall of Fame
- Supercars Hall of Fame
- West Coast Stock Car/Motorsports Hall of Fame

==== Racket sports ====
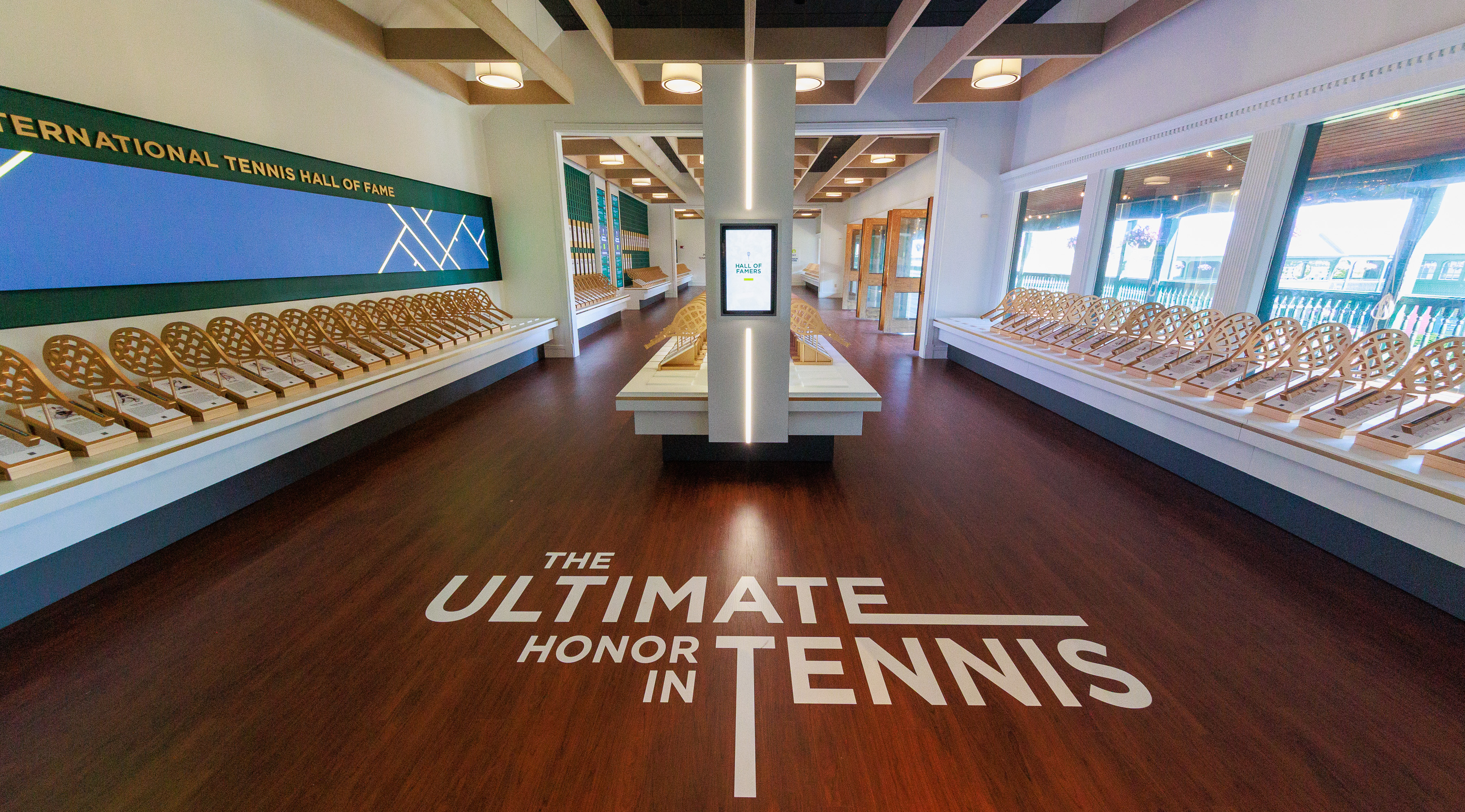
International Tennis Hall of Fame, Newport, Rhode Island, U.S.

- Australian Tennis Hall of Fame
- Badminton Hall of Fame
- International Tennis Hall of Fame
- ITTF Hall of Fame
- Pickleball Hall of Fame

==== Rugby ====
- Australian Rugby League Hall of Fame (est. 2002)
- Bulldogs Hall of Fame (est. 2007)
- Leeds Rhinos Hall of Fame
- Rugby Football League Hall of Fame (est. 1988)
- Rugby League Hall of Fame (est. 1988)
- St Helens R.F.C. Hall of Fame
- US Rugby Hall of Fame
- Widnes Vikings Hall of Fame (est. 1992)
- Wigan Warriors Hall of Fame (est. 1998)
- World Rugby Hall of Fame

==== Sailing ====
- America's Cup Hall of Fame
- ISAF Sailing Hall of Fame
- National Sailing Hall of Fame

==== Skateboarding ====
- Skate Canada Hall of Fame
- Skateboarding Hall of Fame

==== Sports media ====
- American Sportscasters Association Hall of Fame
- NAB Broadcasting Hall of Fame
- National Sports Media Association Hall of Fame
- US Basketball Writers Association Hall of Fame

==== Track and field ====
- International Association of Athletics Federations Hall of Fame
- National Distance Running Hall of Fame
- National Track and Field Hall of Fame
- RRCA Distance Running Hall of Fame
- USATF Masters Hall of Fame

==== Video games ====
- AIAS Hall of Fame
- International Video Game Hall of Fame
- World Video Game Hall of Fame

==== Winter sports ====
- Canadian Curling Hall of Fame
- Canadian Ski Hall of Fame
- Colorado Ski and Snowboard Hall of Fame
- Manitoba Curling Hall of Fame
- Swedish Curling Hall of Fame
- United States Curling Association Hall of Fame
- United States Figure Skating Hall of Fame
- United States National Ski Hall of Fame and Museum
- Vermont Ski and Snowboard Hall of Fame
- World Curling Federation Hall of Fame
- World Figure Skating Hall of Fame

==== Wrestling ====
- AAA Hall of Fame
- CZW Hall of Fame
- Glorias de Lucha Libre Hall of Fame
- Hardcore Hall of Fame
- TNA Hall of Fame
- International Professional Wrestling Hall of Fame
- National Wrestling Hall of Fame
- New England Pro Wrestling Hall of Fame
- NWA Hall of Fame
- NWA Wrestling Legends Hall of Heroes
- Professional Wrestling Hall of Fame
- ROH Hall of Fame
- Southern California Pro-Wrestling Hall of Fame
- Southern Wrestling Hall of Fame
- St. Louis Wrestling Hall of Fame
- TNA Hall of Fame
- WCW Hall of Fame
- Wrestling Observer Newsletter Hall of Fame
- WWE Hall of Fame

==== Other ====
- Archery Hall of Fame
- Australian Netball Hall of Fame
- Billiard Congress of America Hall of Fame
- Croquet Hall of Fame
- International Gymnastics Hall of Fame
- International Volleyball Hall of Fame
- Professional Darts Association Hall of Fame
- Roller Derby Hall of Fame
- Soaring Hall of Fame
- US Ballooning Hall of Fame
- USA Field Hockey Hall of Fame
- USA Shooting Hall of Fame

=== Toys ===
- National Bobblehead Hall of Fame and Museum
- National Toy Hall of Fame
- Toy Industry Hall of Fame

=== Women's ===
- Alabama Women's Hall of Fame
- Alaska Women's Hall of Fame
- Arizona Women's Hall of Fame
- Arkansas Women's Hall of Fame
- Chicago Women's Hall of Fame
- Colorado Women's Hall of Fame
- Connecticut Women's Hall of Fame
- D.C. Women's Hall of Fame
- El Paso Women's Hall of Fame
- Florida Women's Hall of Fame
- Garrett County Women's Hall of Fame
- Georgia Women of Achievement
- Hall of Fame of Delaware Women
- Iowa Women's Hall of Fame
- Kentucky Women Remembered
- Lebanon County Women's Hall of Fame
- Louisiana Center for Women in Government and Business Hall of Fame
- Maine Women's Hall of Fame
- Maryland Women's Hall of Fame
- Michigan Women's Hall of Fame
- National Women's Hall of Fame
- New Jersey Women's Hall of Fame
- North Carolina Women's Hall of Fame
- Ohio Women's Hall of Fame
- Okaloosa County Women's Hall of Fame
- Oklahoma Women's Hall of Fame
- Oregon Women of Achievement
- Singapore Women's Hall of Fame
- Tasmanian Honour Roll of Women
- Tennessee Women's Hall of Fame
- Texas Women's Hall of Fame
- Victorian Honour Roll of Women

=== Miscellaneous ===
- Alabama Hall of Fame
- American Bladesmith Society Hall of Fame
- Arkansas Black Hall of Fame
- Asian Hall of Fame
- Blacks in Colorado Hall of Fame
- California Hall of Fame
- California Social Work Hall of Distinction
- Canadian Disability Hall of Fame
- Cooperative Hall of Fame
- Criminals Hall of Fame
- DeMolay International Hall of Fame
- Etobicoke Hall of Fame
- Hall of Fame for Great Americans – the first hall of fame
- Hall of Famous Missourians
- Hall of Great Westerners
- International Scuba Diving Hall of Fame
- Library Hall of Fame
- Louisiana Political Museum and Hall of Fame
- National Hall of Fame for Famous American Indians
- National Museum of American Jewish History Hall of Fame
- National Native American Hall of Fame
- National Stuttering Association Hall of Fame
- Nebraska Hall of Fame
- New Jersey Hall of Fame
- Oklahoma Hall of Fame
- Orange County Hall of Fame
- Rose Hall of Fame
- South Carolina Hall of Fame
- South Dakota Hall of Fame
- Scandinavian-American Hall of Fame
- Texas Trail of Fame
- Walhalla Memorial
- Wallace Monument Hall of Heroes

== Walls of fame ==
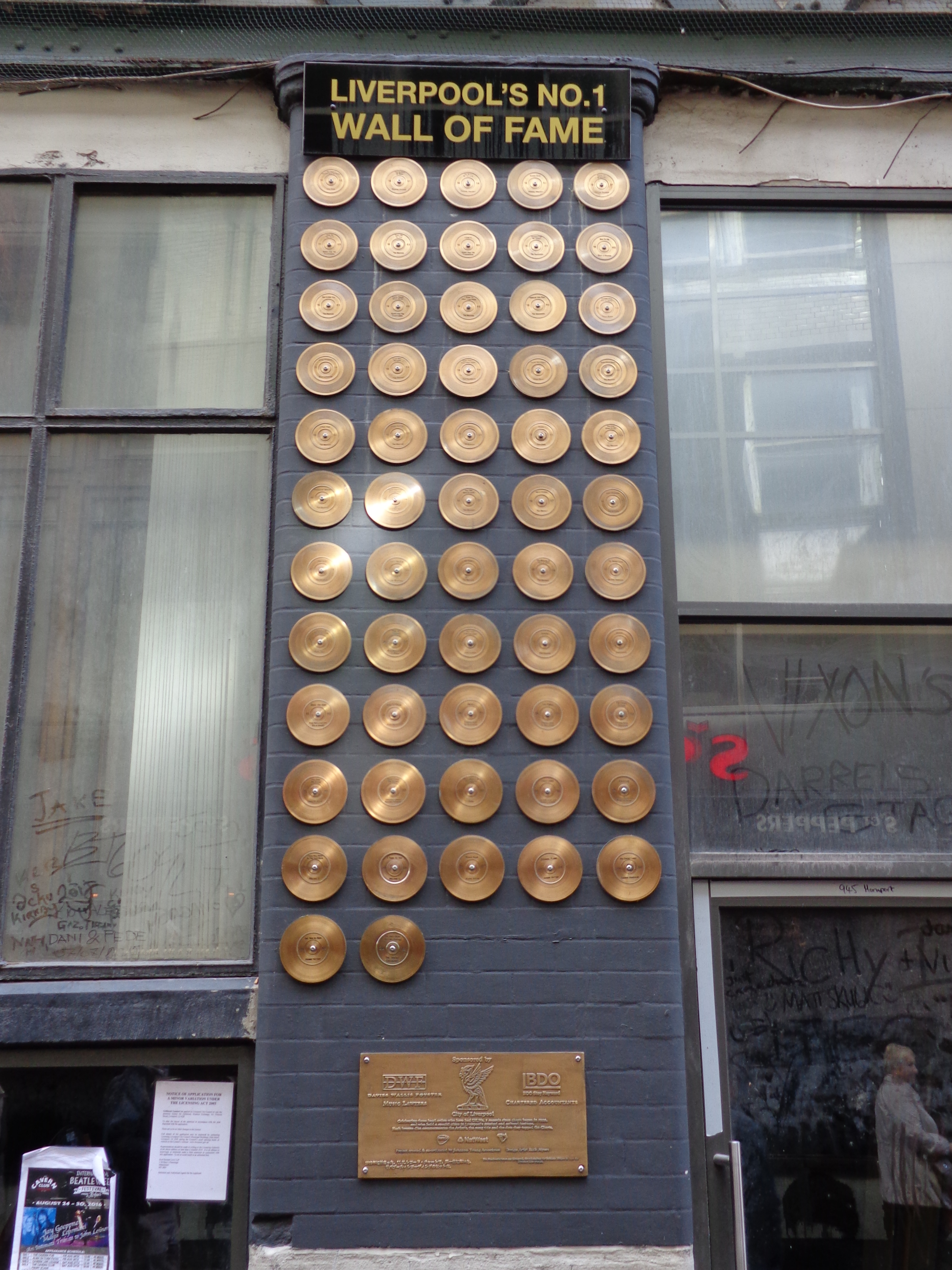
Liverpool Wall of Fame, Liverpool, England

- Alassio wall
- Buffalo Bills Wall of Fame
- Liverpool Wall of Fame
- Milwaukee Braves Wall of Honor
- Milwaukee Brewers Wall of Honor
- Missouri Wall of Fame
- National LGBTQ Wall of Honor
- Philadelphia Baseball Wall of Fame
- Piteå Wall of Fame
- Presidential Walk of Fame
- San Francisco Giants Wall of Fame
- Syracuse Baseball Wall of Fame

== Walks of fame ==
=== Asia ===
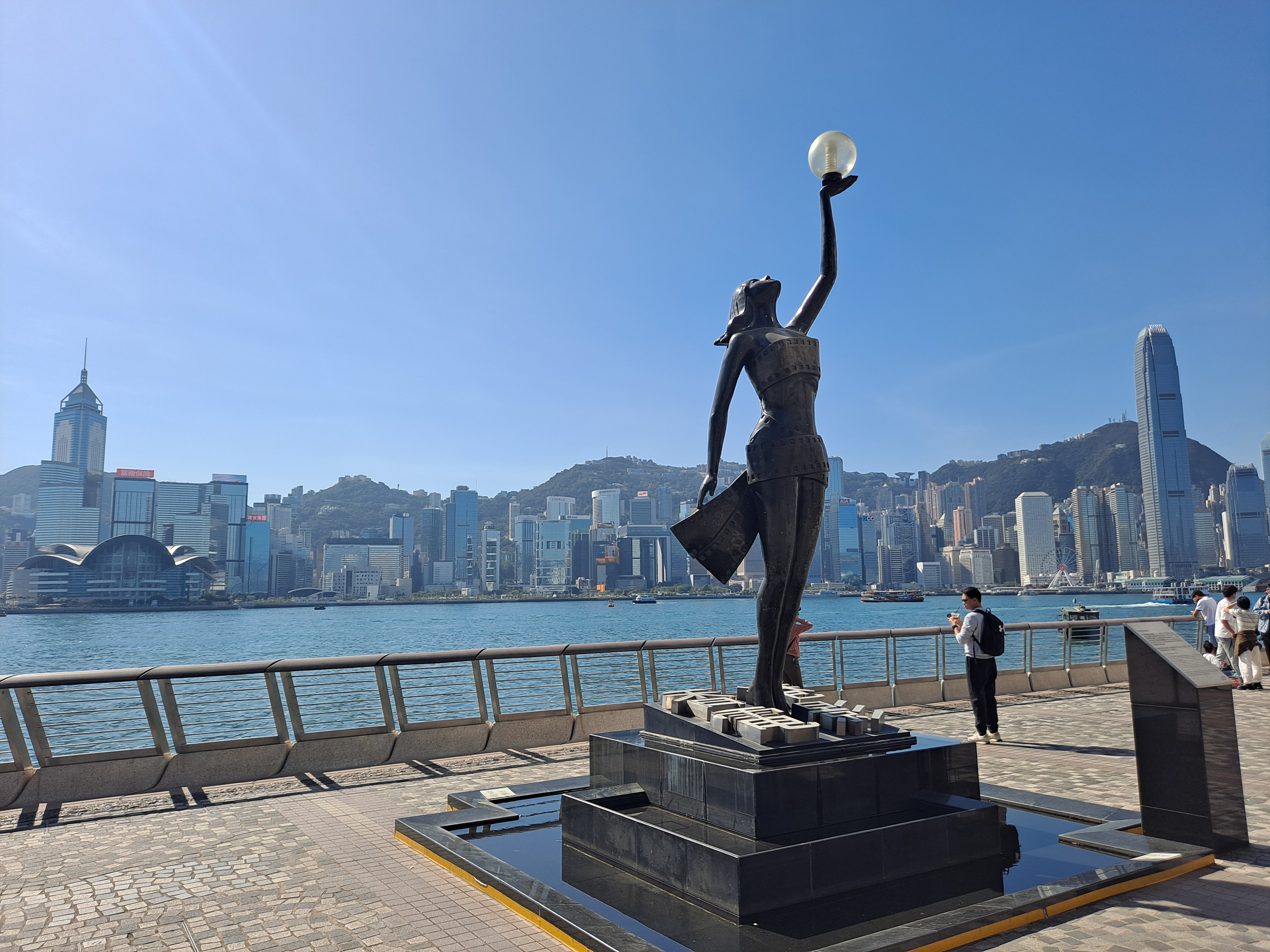
Hong Kong Avenue of Stars, Hong Kong

- The Dubai Stars (Dubai, United Arab Emirates)
- Eastwood City Walk of Fame (Quezon City, Philippines)
- Hong Kong Avenue of Stars (Hong Kong)
- Walk of the Stars (Mumbai, India)

=== Europe ===
==== England ====
- Believe Square (Wigan)
- Birmingham Walk of Stars (Birmingham)
- Dog Walk of Fame (London)
- London Avenue of Stars (London)
- Music Walk of Fame (Camden)
- Sheffield Legends (Sheffield)
- Wembley Arena Square of Fame (London)

==== Germany ====
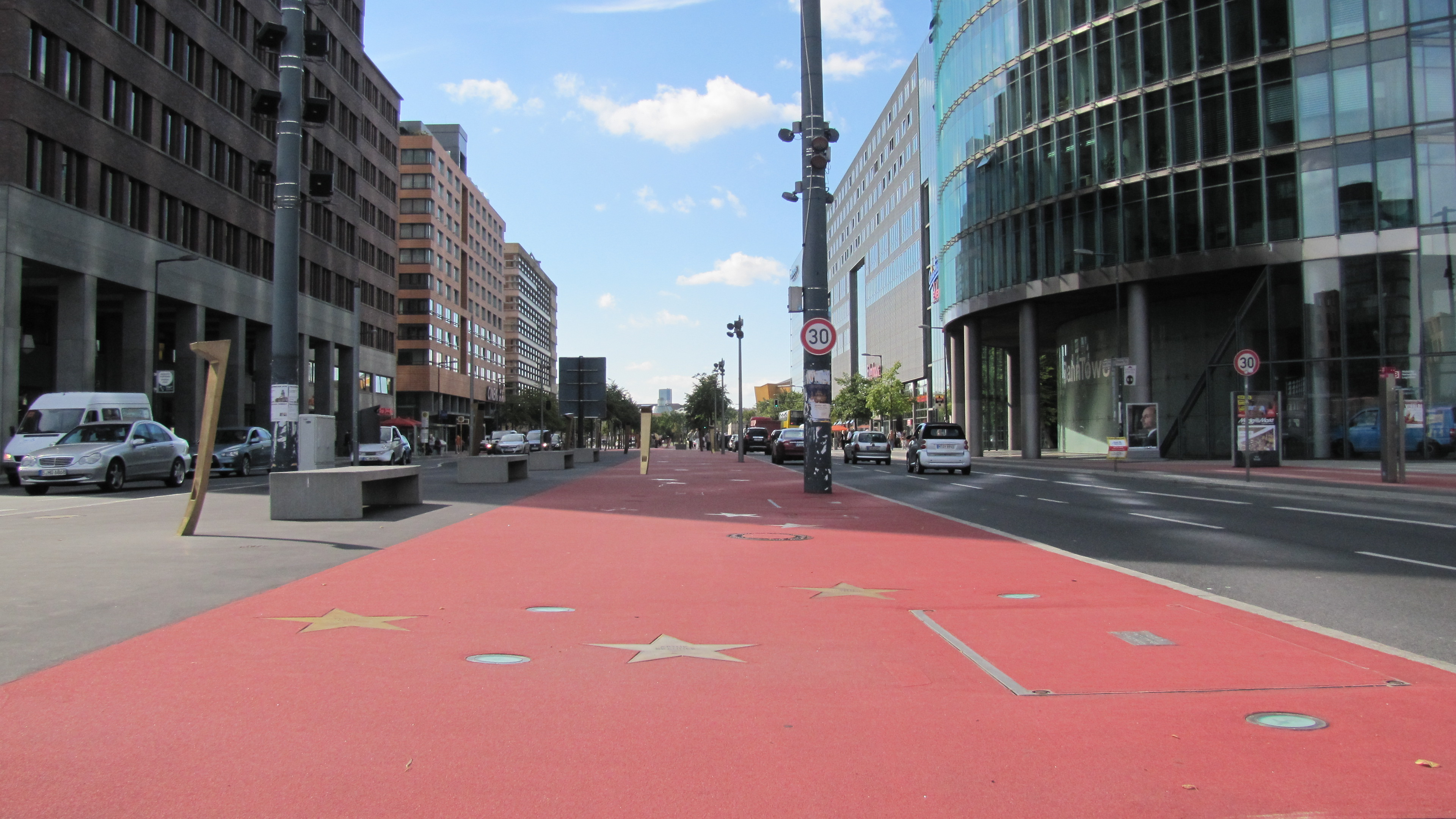
Boulevard der Stars (de), Berlin, Germany

- Boulevard der Stars (Berlin)
- Munich Olympic Walk of Stars (Munich)
- Walk of Fame of Cabaret (Mainz)

==== Ukraine ====
- Walk of the Brave (Kyiv)
- Odesa Walk of Fame (Odesa)

==== Other ====
- Almeria Walk of Fame (Almería, Spain)
- Bergen Walk of Fame – (Bergen, Norway)
- Golden Foot — The Champions Promenade (Monte Carlo, Monaco)
- Kazan Alley of Tatar Stars (Kazan, Russia)
- Łódź Walk of Fame (pl) (Łódź, Poland)
- Sea Breeze Walk of Fame (Baku, Azerbaijan)
- Street Of Stars (Madrid, Spain)
- Street of the Tripods (Athens, Greece), dates to 4th century BC
- Tampere Walk of Fame (Tampere, Finland)
- Walk of Fame Bucharest (Bucharest, Romania)
- Walk of Fame of Italian sport (Rome, Italy)

=== North America ===
==== Canada, Ontario ====
- Brampton Arts Walk of Fame (Brampton)
- Canada's Walk of Fame (Toronto)
- Italian Walk of Fame (Toronto)
- Mississauga Walk of Fame (Mississauga)
- Sault Ste Marie Walk of Fame (Sault Ste. Marie)
- Scarborough Walk of Fame (Toronto)
- Town of Caledon Walk of Fame (Caledon)

==== United States, California ====
- Aerospace Walk of Honor (Lancaster)
- Anaheim Walk of Stars (Anaheim)
- Avenue of the Athletes (Los Angeles)
- Flight Path Walk of Fame (Los Angeles)
- Golden Age of Porn Walk of Fame (West Hollywood)
- Hollywood Walk of Fame (Los Angeles)
- Hollywood's Rockwalk (Los Angeles)
- Long Beach Motorsports Walk of Fame (Long Beach)
- Palm Springs Walk of Stars (Palm Springs)
- Porn Block of Fame (Los Angeles)
- Rainbow Honor Walk (San Francisco)
- Rodeo Drive Walk of Style (Beverly Hills)
- Sacramento Walk of Stars (Sacramento)
- Studio City Walk of Fame (Los Angeles)
- Walk of Game (San Francisco)
- Walk of Western Stars (Santa Clarita)

==== United States, New York City ====
- Bronx Walk of Fame
- Madison Square Garden Walk of Fame
- New Rochelle Walk of Fame
- Yiddish Theatre Walk of Fame
- Theatre 80 Walk of Fame

==== United States, Other ====
- American Family Field Walk of Fame (Milwaukee, Wisconsin)
- America's Walk of Honor (Valley Forge, Pennsylvania)
- Black Music & Entertainment Walk of Fame (Atlanta, Georgia)
- Black Music Walk of Fame (Cincinnati, Ohio)
- Calle Ocho Walk of Fame (Miami, Florida)
- Clarksdale Walk of Fame (Clarksdale, Mississippi)
- Entrepreneur Walk of Fame (Cambridge, Massachusetts)
- The Extra Mile (Washington DC)
- Gennett Walk of Fame (Richmond, Indiana)
- International Civil Rights Walk of Fame (Atlanta, Georgia)
- Las Vegas Walk of Stars (Las Vegas, Nevada)
- Michigan Walk of Fame (Lansing, Michigan)
- Milwaukee Brewers Walk of Fame (Milwaukee, Wisconsin)
- Music City Walk of Fame (Nashville, Tennessee)
- New Orleans Walk of Fame (New Orleans, Louisiana)
- Paramount Plaza Walk of Fame (Grafton, Wisconsin)
- St. Louis Walk of Fame (St. Louis, Missouri)
- StarWalk (Nashville, Tennessee)
- Walk of Champions (Tuscaloosa, Alabama)
- West Texas Walk of Fame (Lubbock, Texas)
- US Space Walk of Fame (Titusville, Florida)

==== Other ====
- Paseo de las Luminarias (Mexico City, Mexico)

=== South America ===
- Vídeo Show Walk of Fame (Rio de Janeiro, Brazil)
- Walk of Glory (Bueno Aires, Argentina)
- Walk of the Amazon Heroes (Iquitos, Peru)

=== Oceania ===
==== Australia ====
- Adelaide Festival Centre Walk of Fame (Adelaide)
- Australian of the Year Walk (Canberra)
- Australian Film Walk of Fame (Sydney)
- Jubilee 150 Walkway (Adelaide)
- Sydney Writers Walk (Sydney)

== See also ==
- Hall of Honor
