= Football Hall of Fame =

Football Hall of Fame may refer to one of the below notable entities.

Association football is also known as soccer in some regions. Australian rules football is played professionally only in Australia, although it is also contested elsewhere at the amateur level. Gridiron football includes American football (both professional and college), Arena football, and Canadian football.

Physical locations, when known, are noted. Some of the entities do not maintain a physical presence.

== Association football ==
- Asian Football Hall of Fame
- English Football Hall of Fame, located in Manchester, England, U.K.
- Finnish Football Hall of Fame, located in Valkeakoski, Finland
- Football Australia Hall of Fame
- Football Hall of Fame Western Australia
- Israeli Football Hall of Fame
- Japan Football Hall of Fame, located in Bunkyo, Tokyo, Japan
- National Soccer Hall of Fame, located in Frisco, Texas, U.S.
- Scottish Football Hall of Fame, located in Glasgow, Scotland, U.K.

== Australian rules football ==
- Australian Football Hall of Fame
- South Australian Football Hall of Fame
- Tasmanian Football Hall of Fame, located in York Park, Launceston, Tasmania
- West Australian Football Hall of Fame

== Gridiron football ==
=== American football ===
- Black College Football Hall of Fame, located in Canton, Ohio, U.S.
- College Football Hall of Fame, located in Atlanta, Georgia, U.S.
- Hispanic Football Hall of Fame
- Indiana Football Hall of Fame, located in Richmond, Indiana, U.S.
- Polynesian Football Hall of Fame, located in Oahu, Hawaii, U.S.
- Pro Football Hall of Fame, located in Canton, Ohio, U.S.
- South Carolina Football Hall of Fame

=== Arena football ===
- Arena Football Hall of Fame
- Indoor Football League Hall of Fame

=== Canadian football ===
- Canadian Football Hall of Fame, located in Hamilton, Ontario, Canada

== See also ==
- Hall of Fame (disambiguation)
