= Hall of Honor =

Hall of Honor may refer to:

== Military ==
- National Purple Heart Hall of Honor, Windsor, New York
- Texas A&M University Corps of Cadets Hall of Honor, College Station, Texas
- Texas Military Hall of Honor, Austin, Texas
- United States Army Officer Candidate School Hall of Honor, Columbus, Georgia
- United States Army Ranger Hall of Honor, Columbus, Georgia
- United States National Security Agency Hall of Honor, Fort Meade, Maryland
- United States Naval Aviation Hall of Honor, Pensacola, Florida

== Music ==
- International Bluegrass Music Hall of Fame, Owensboro, Kentucky (until 2006 known as the International Bluegrass Music Hall of Honor)

== Sports ==
- Pac-12 Conference Hall of Honor
- Texas A&M University Athletics Hall of Honor
- University of Michigan Athletic Hall of Honor
- University of Texas Men's Athletics Hall of Honor
- University of Texas Women's Athletics Hall of Honor

== Other ==
- Hall of Honour at the Centre Block of Parliament Hill, Ottawa, Canada
- Texas Heritage Hall of Honor, Dallas, Texas

== See also ==
- Hall of fame (disambiguation)
- List of halls and walks of fame
