= Cricket Hall of Fame (Hartford, Connecticut) =

Cricket attraction in Hartford, Connecticut

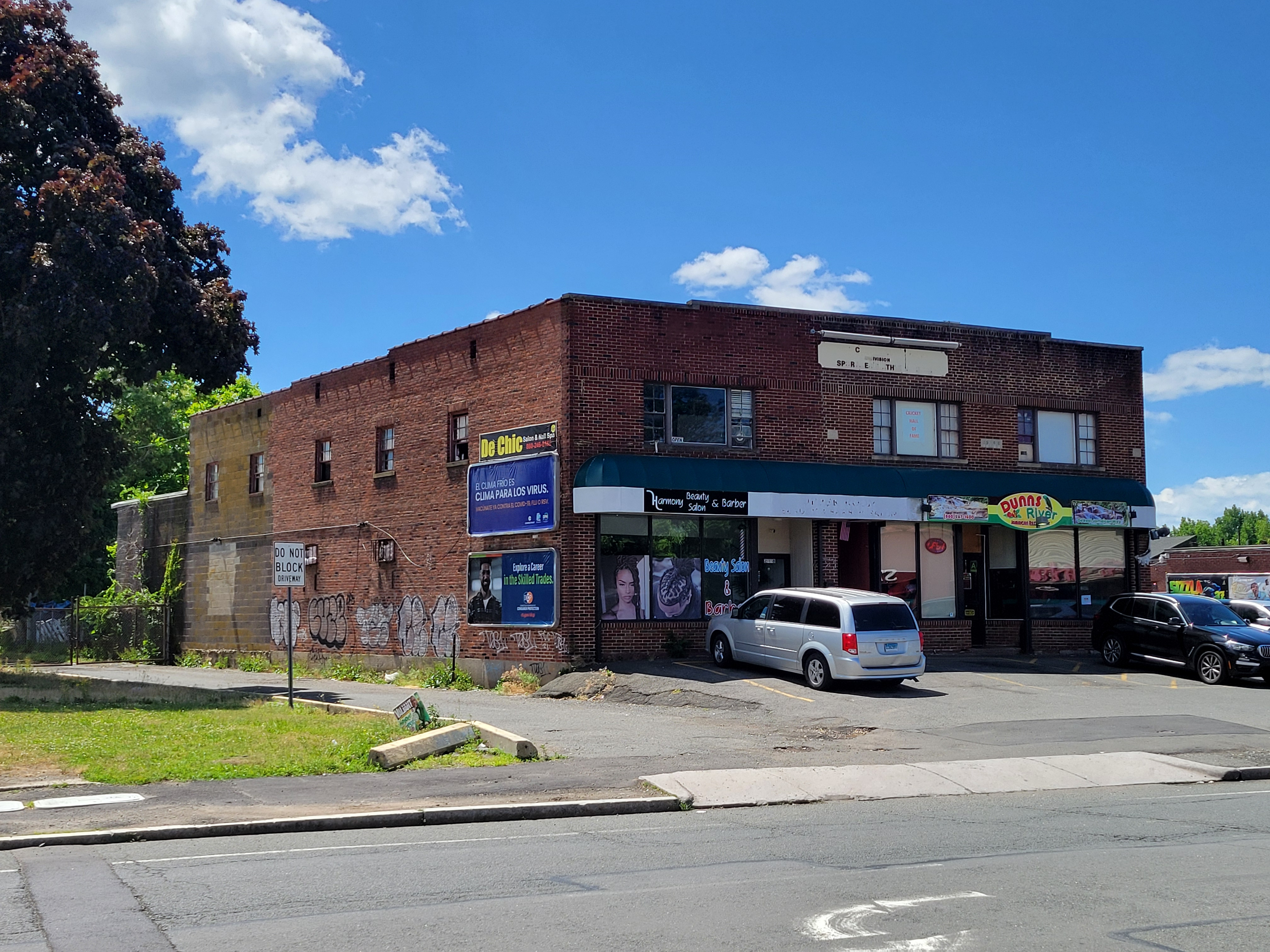
- Cricket Hall of Fame at 3000 Main Street
- Established: 1980
- Location: Hartford, Connecticut, United States
- Coordinates: 41.7931°N 72.666°W
- Type: Museum and hall of fame
- Website: crickethofmuseum.org

The Cricket Hall of Fame is an attraction located in Hartford, Connecticut, U.S.A.. Founded in 1980, it is the first international cricket hall of fame in the world. Every year it hosts an induction ceremony on first Saturday of October, drawing inductees from around the world. Inductees are selected for two categories: players of distinction or someone who has done something to advance the sport of cricket. The Cricket Hall of Fame is supported by the Sportsmen's Athletic Club of Hartford, Connecticut. (Since 1963)

The Cricket Hall of Fame Museum houses many historical cricket artifacts donated by past inductees and supporters. Items include trophies, uniforms, equipment, books, photographs and articles that demonstrate the history of the sport over time.
