= Boxing Hall of Fame =

Boxing Hall of Fame could refer to:

- International Boxing Hall of Fame (IBHOF), located in Canastota, New York
- The Ring magazine Hall of Fame, located at Madison Square Garden, New York City

== See also ==
- Hall of fame (disambiguation)
