= ISAF Sailing Hall of Fame =

- Established: November 23, 1964
- Location: Herreshoff Marine Museum
- Type: Hall of fame
- Website: www.sailing.org/halloffame/home.php

The ISAF Sailing Hall of Fame is the World Sailing's Hall of Fame launched by the International Sailing Federation.

== History ==
To mark the 100 anniversary of the International Sailing Federation, the ISAF Sailing Hall of Fame was launched in 2007 to celebrate the persons across the world who have achieved greatness in the sport of sailing. Sailors will be inducted into the Hall of Fame every third year of the Executive Committee's tenure.

== Members ==
It has inducted sailors on two occasions:

- Olin Stephens, Ellen MacArthur, Paul Elvstrøm, Barbara Kendall, Éric Tabarly and Robin Knox-Johnston were announced and awarded on 5 November 2007 at a dinner at the Estoril Casino, Estoril, Portugal.
- Dennis Conner, Alessandra Sensini, Harold Vanderbilt, Peter Blake, Buddy Melges, Valentin Mankin and Torben Grael were inducted at the 2015 Annual Conference in Sanya, China.
