= Studio City Walk of Fame =

Walk of Fame honoring film and television in Studio City

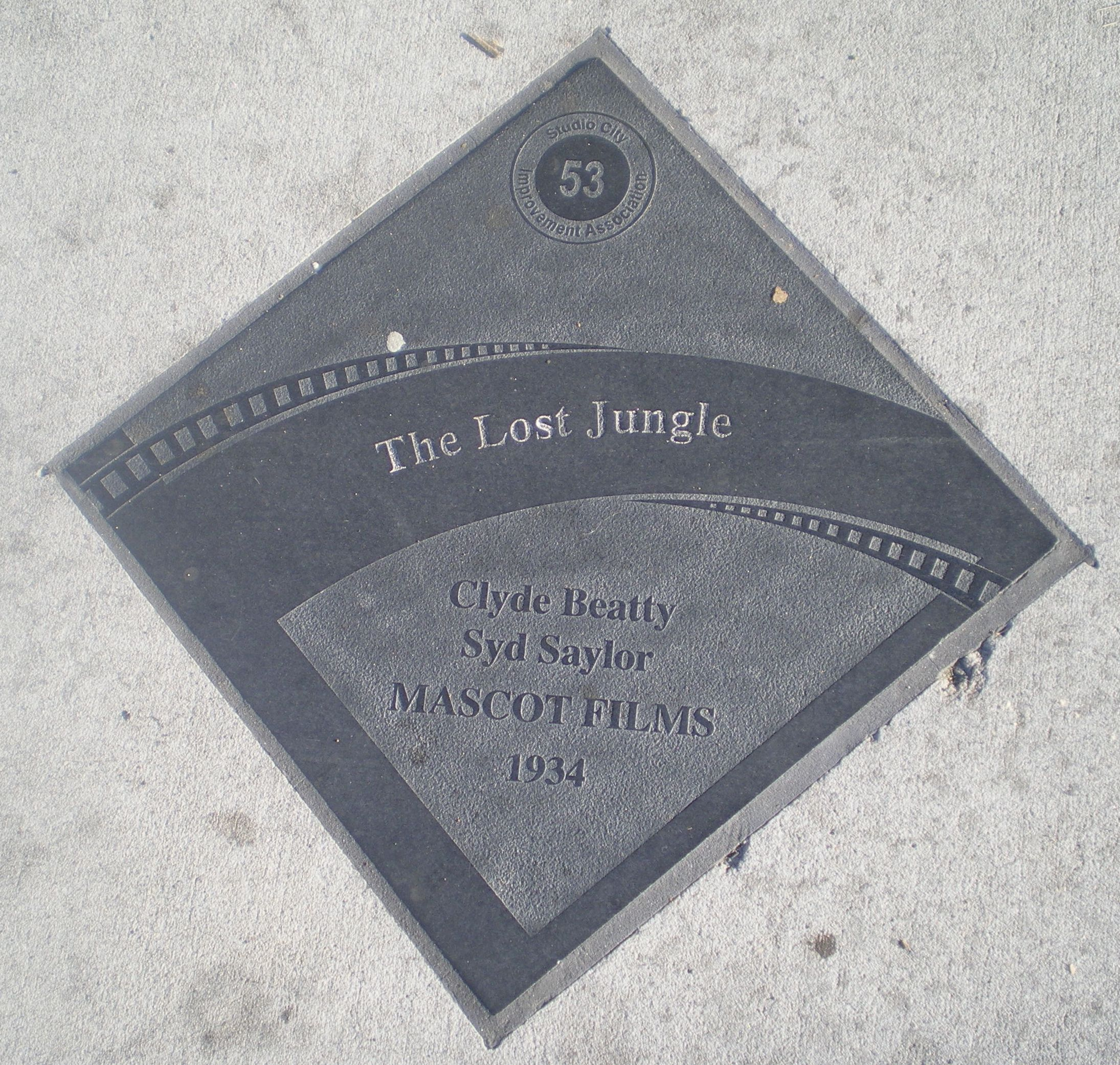
- Plaque for The Lost Jungle on the Studio City Walk of Fame

- Location in Los Angeles
- Established: 2003
- Location: Studio City, California, U.S.
- Coordinates: 34.143579°N 118.395262°W

The Studio City Walk of Fame is a walk of fame located in Studio City, California that honors the area's contribution to the entertainment industry.

== Description ==
The Studio City of Fame consists of 300 granite diamonds embedded in the sidewalk along Ventura Boulevard between Carpenter Avenue and Rhodes Avenue. It is part of the Studio City Property and Business Improvement District.

== History ==
A previous Walk of Fame was established on Ventura Boulevard in Studio City in the 1960s. It consisted of thirteen small brass sidewalk plaques spaced twenty feet apart, honoring actors such as Elke Sommer, Marjorie Lord, Rhys Williams, and Jay Novello. By the late 1980s, the Walk was covered in weeds and garbage.

The current Studio City Walk of Fame was established by the Studio City Improvement Agency and the Los Angeles Cultural Affairs Commission in 2003. It honors the area's contributions to the entertainment industry, both movies and television.

== Honorees ==
Honorees on the Studio City Walk of Fame include:

=== Movies ===
- Macbeth (Orson Welles’s version)
- Republic Pictures westerns (numerous)

=== Television shows ===
- Gilligan's Island
- Hill Street Blues
- Leave it to Beaver
- Rawhide
- Seinfeld
- Will and Grace

== See also ==
- List of Halls and Walks of Fame
