= Hall of fame (disambiguation) =

A hall of fame is an attraction or list recognizing people or accomplishments in a given field.

Hall of Fame may also refer to:

== Music ==
=== Albums ===
- Hall of Fame (Count Basie album), 1950s
- Hall of Fame (The Moody Blues album), 2000
- Hall of Fame (Big Sean album)
- Hall of Fame (Polo G album)
- Hall of Fame: A Tribute to Bob Marley's 50th Anniversary, an album by Bunny Wailer
- F2D Presents: Hall of Fame, a 2017 album by South African hip hop collective Fresh 2 Def

=== Songs ===
- "Hall of Fame" (song), 2012, by The Script
- "Hall of Fame", a 2023 song by Stray Kids from 5-Star

== See also ==
- Boxing Hall of Fame (disambiguation)
- Hall of Honor (disambiguation)
