= Walk of the Brave =

Memorial in Kyiv, Ukraine

- Ukrainian: Алея сміливості (Алея сміливости)
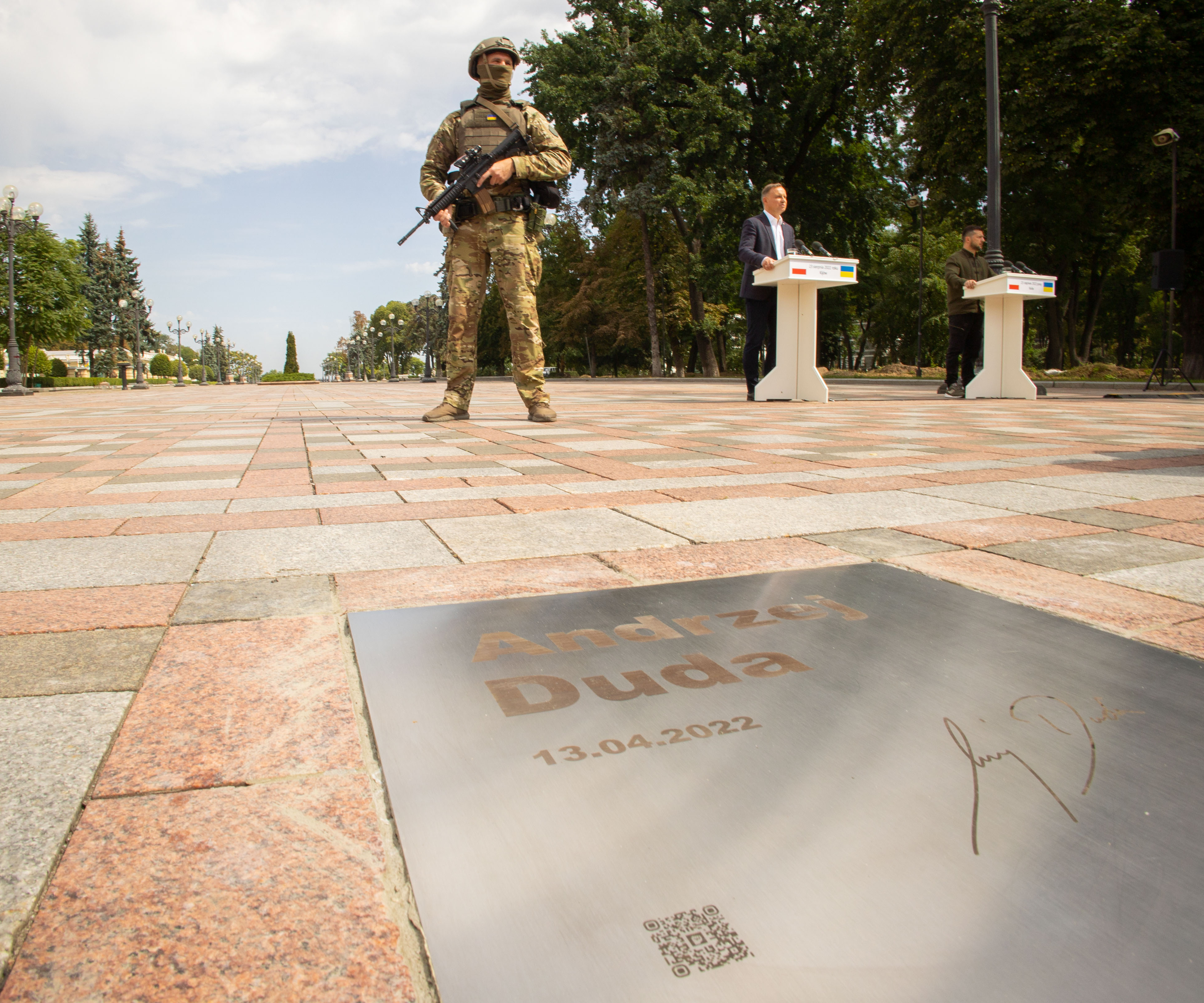
- The first foreign leader to be honored on the Walk of the Brave – President of Poland Andrzej Duda
- Interactive map of Walk of the Brave
- Location: Kyiv, Ukraine
- Coordinates: 50°26′51.6″N 30°32′18.4″E
- Type: alley
- Opening date: 23 August 2022
- Website: https://walkofthebrave.com/

The Walk of the Brave was laid in Kyiv on the initiative of President of Ukraine Volodymyr Zelenskyy for the 31st anniversary of Ukraine's independence. The place was not chosen by chance, because it was on the Constitution Square opposite the Verkhovna Rada.

The Walk features leaders and countries who have supported Ukraine during the 2022 Russian invasion of Ukraine.

== History ==
The Walk of the Brave was laid on Constitution Square near the Verkhovna Rada building in Kyiv to mark the 31st anniversary of Ukraine's independence.

The Walk features leaders and countries who have supported Ukraine during the 2022 Russian invasion of Ukraine.

The President of Poland Andrzej Duda was the first to be honored. He personally took part in the opening.

== Leaders who are honored on the Walk of the Brave ==
All leaders of countries and opinion leaders who visited Ukraine from February 24 to August 24 will be immortalized on the Walk of the Brave, but only the following plaques were solemnly opened:

=== Poland ===
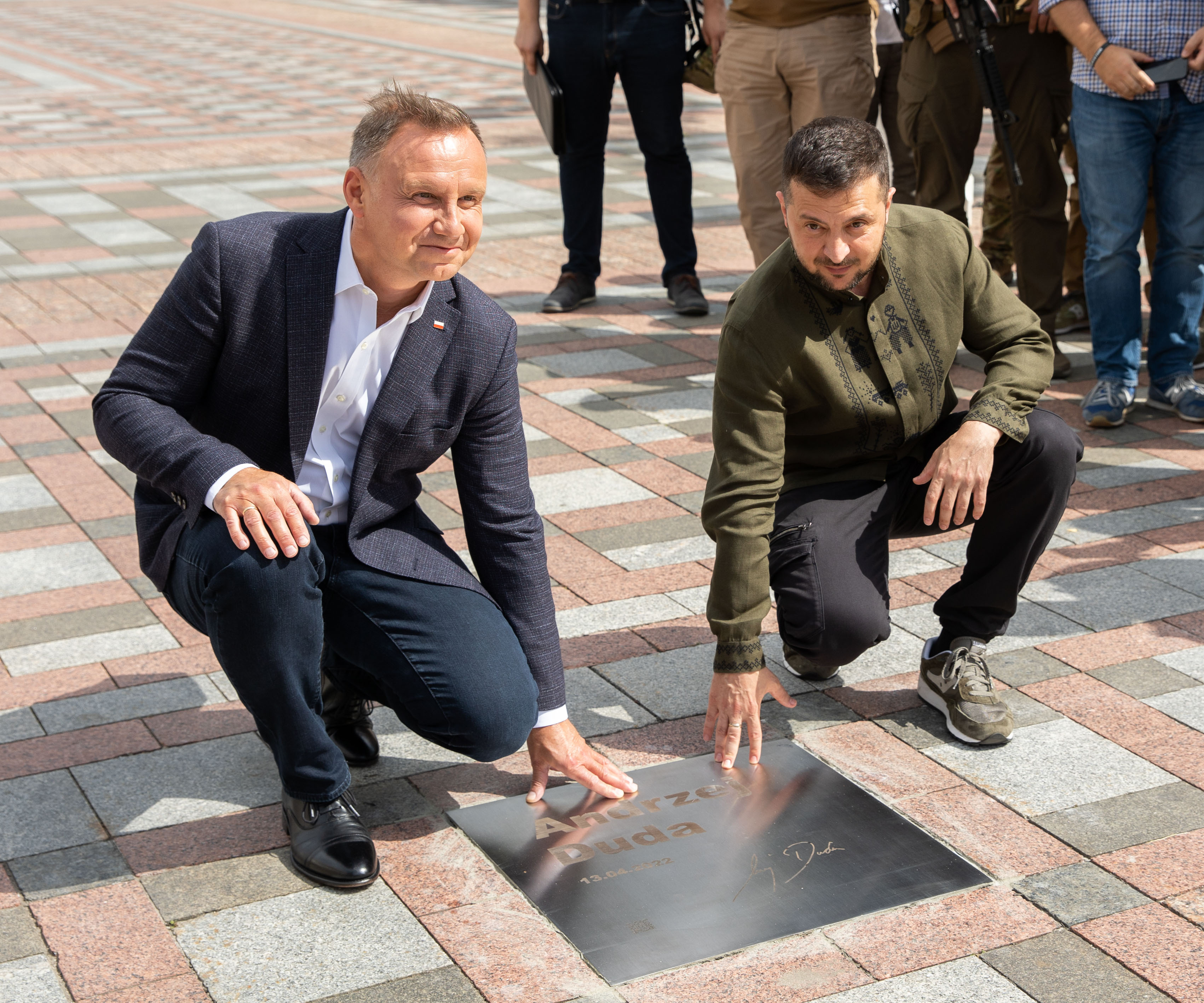
The President of Ukraine Volodymyr Zelenskyy and the President of the Republic of Poland Andrzej Duda took part in the opening of the Walk of the Brave on Constitution Square in Kyiv

The President of Poland Andrzej Duda was the first to be honored.

“Today I want to open the Walk of the Brave in the presence of President of Poland Andrzej Duda. His name will always be on this Walk. It is a symbol of bravery, a symbol of friendship, of support for Ukraine when it is really needed,” Volodymyr Zelenskyy stated.

=== United Kingdom ===
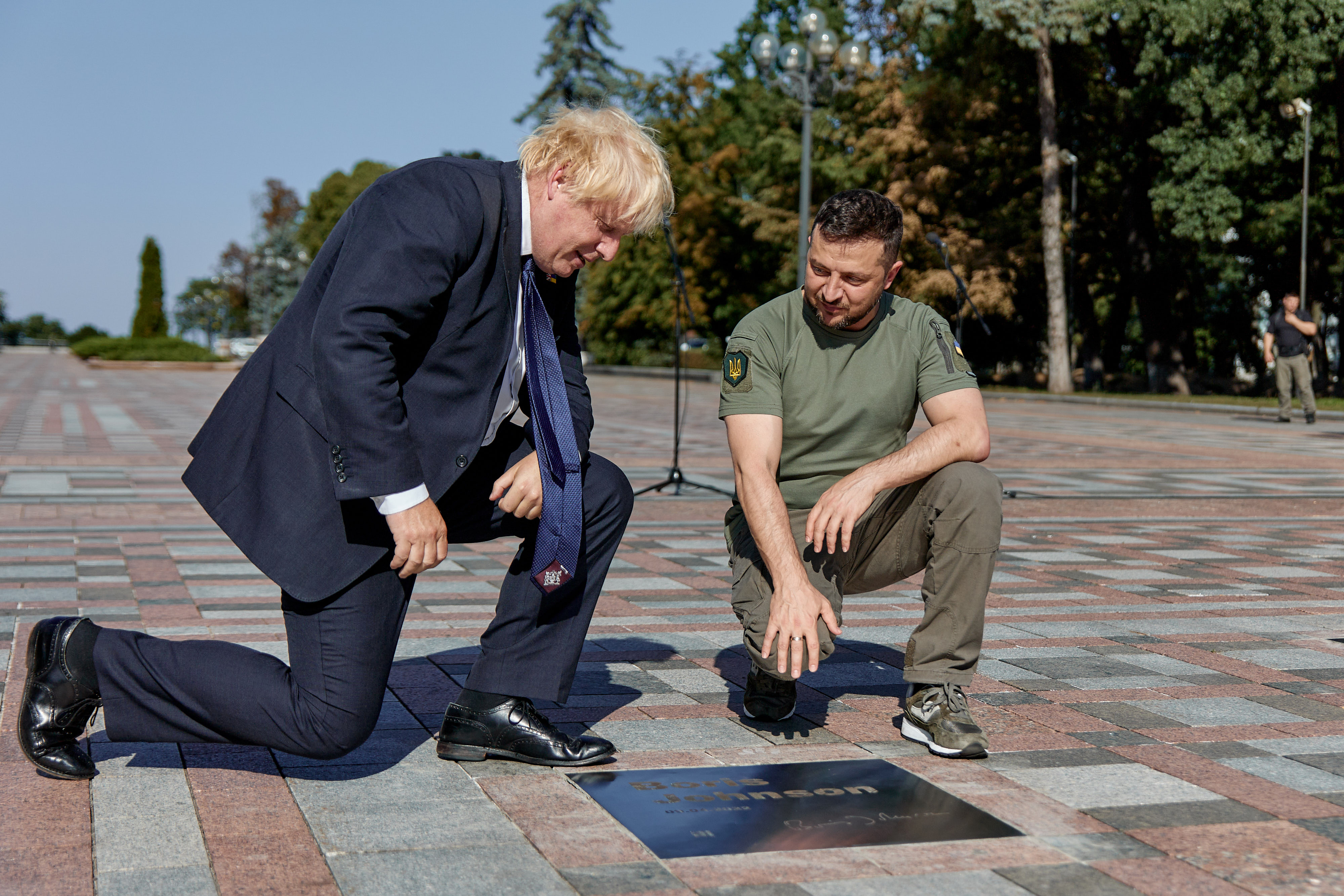
The President of Ukraine Volodymyr Zelenskyy and the Prime Minister of Great Britain Boris Johnson on Constitution Square in Kyiv

On August 24, 2022, a plaque honoring Boris Johnson was unveiled.

“We are personally grateful to Boris Johnson for his leadership, grateful for all these months of support, grateful to the society of Great Britain for the great help that the great power - Great Britain - provided to us every day, constantly, during the full-scale invasion,” said the President of Ukraine.

“We will thank not only in words, but also historically. Therefore, the name of Prime Minister of Great Britain Boris Johnson will appear on this Walk of the Brave today,” he said.

=== Latvia ===
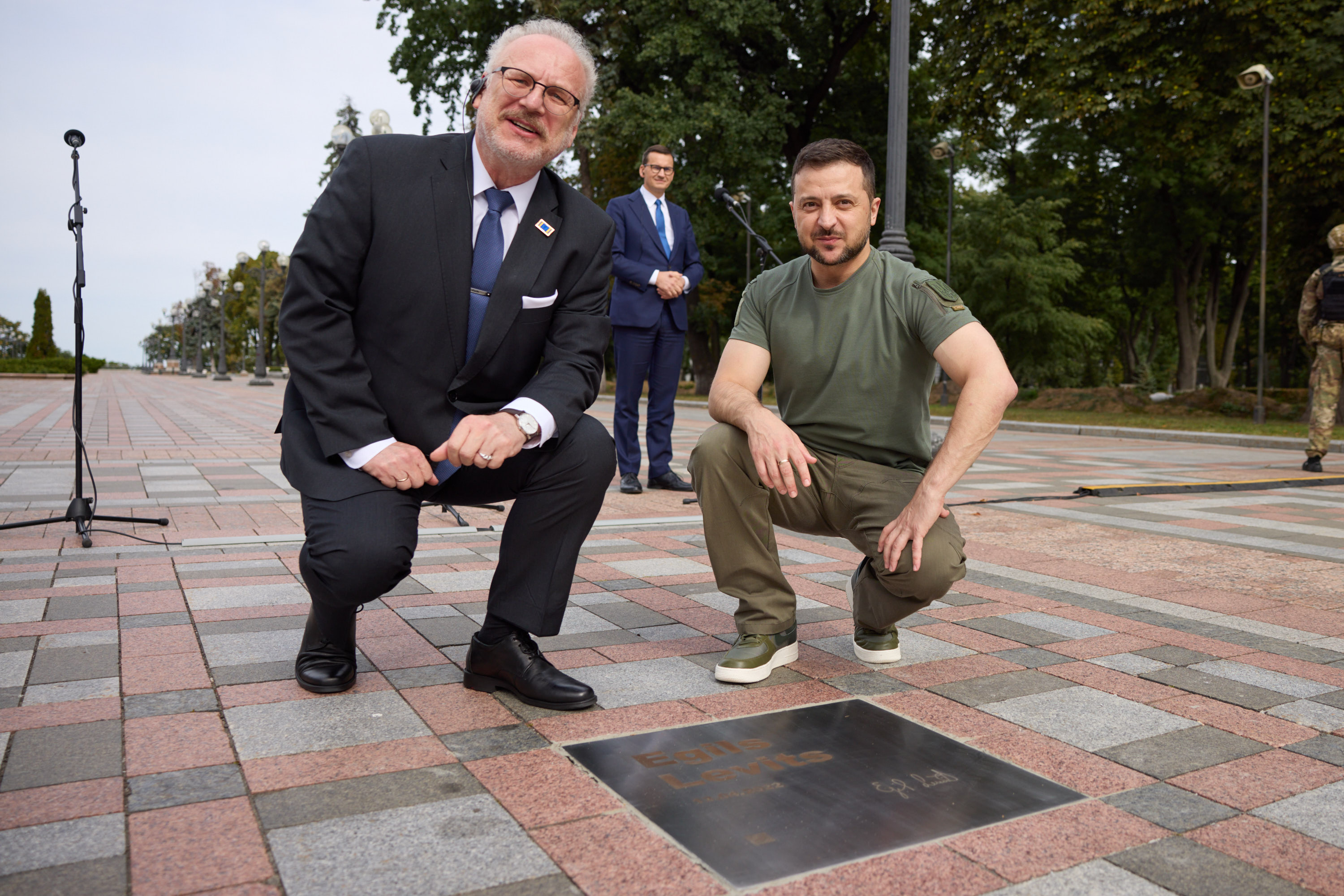
The President of Ukraine Volodymyr Zelenskyy and the President of Latvia Egils Levits

On September 9, 2022, during a visit to Ukraine, the President of Latvia Egils Levits together with the President of Ukraine Volodymyr Zelenskyy opened a plaque with his name on the Walk of the Brave.

=== Czech Republic, Poland, and Slovenia ===
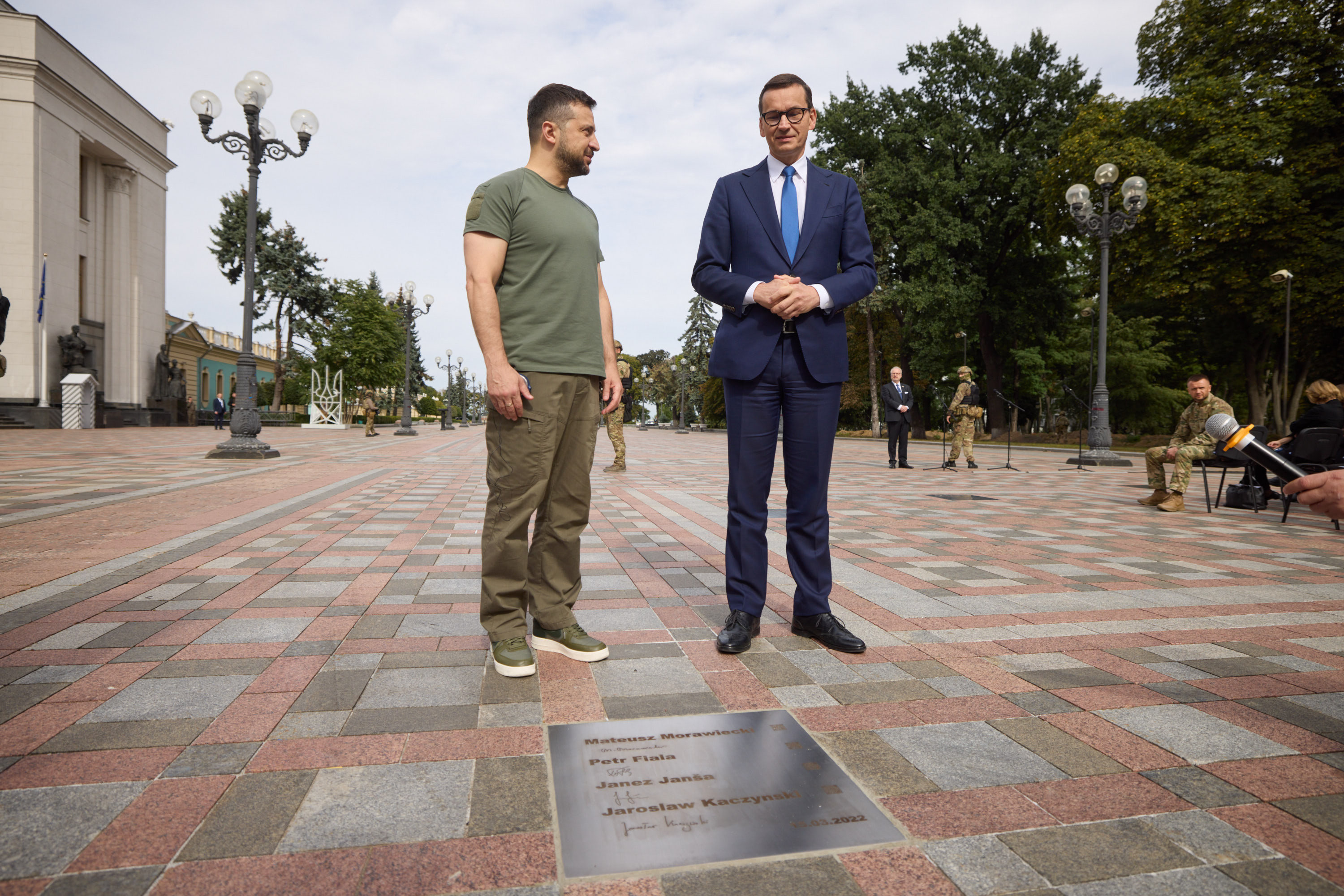
The President of Ukraine Volodymyr Zelenskyy with the Prime Minister of Poland Mateusz Morawiecki

On March 15 the Prime Minister of Poland Mateusz Morawiecki, the Prime Minister of Czech Republic Petr Fiala, and the Prime Minister of Slovenia Janez Janša, as well as the Deputy Prime Minister of Poland for Security Affairs, the leader of the ruling Law and Justice party, Jarosław Kaczyński, were the first of all foreign leaders to visit Ukraine from the beginning of the 2022 Russian invasion of Ukraine.

On September 9, 2022, the Prime Minister of Poland, Mateusz Morawiecki, together with the President of Ukraine, Volodymyr Zelenskyy, opened a plaque on which the names of all 4 politicians were displayed.

=== United States ===
On February 21, 2023, the President of the United States, Joe Biden was honored with a plaque on the Walk of the Brave. Biden had made a surprise visit to Ukraine on the same day to show support for their fight against Russia.

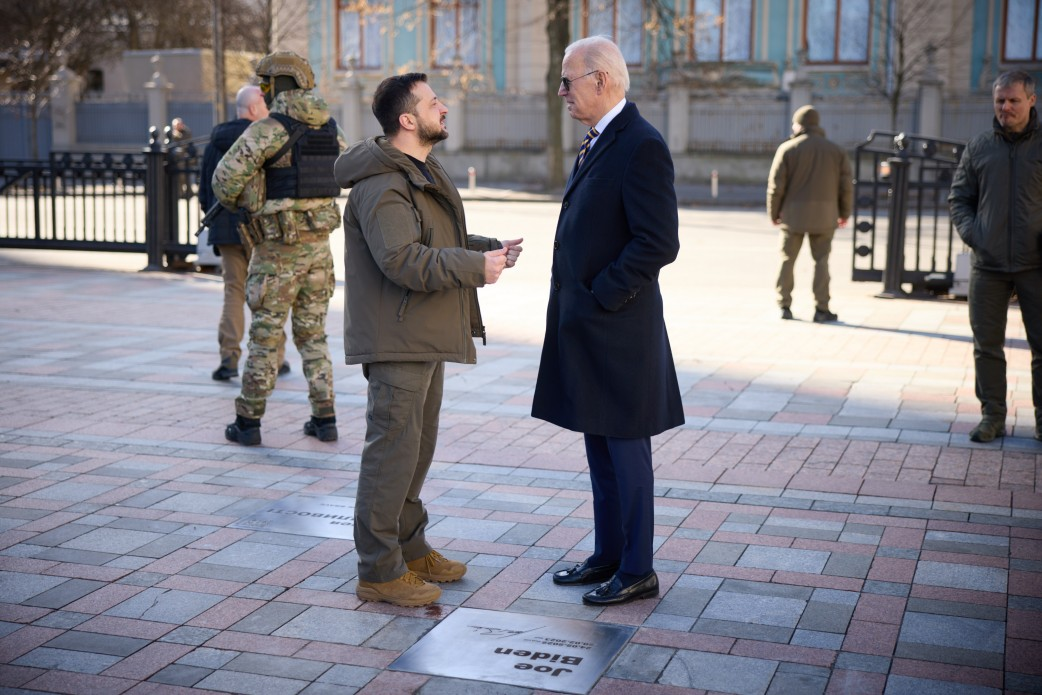
Volodymyr Zelenskyy and Joe Biden unveiled a plaque dedicated to the U.S. President on the Walk of the Brave

=== European Union ===
“In times of war, we gather on this square not by a coincidence, as here are the names of world leaders who supported our state, our people, our economy and during this war stood by our side against the aggression of the Russian Federation. I would like the name of the honorable President of the European Commission, Ursula von der Leyen, to appear on this Walk today,” Volodymyr Zelenskyy said during a ceremony unveiling a plaque in her honor.

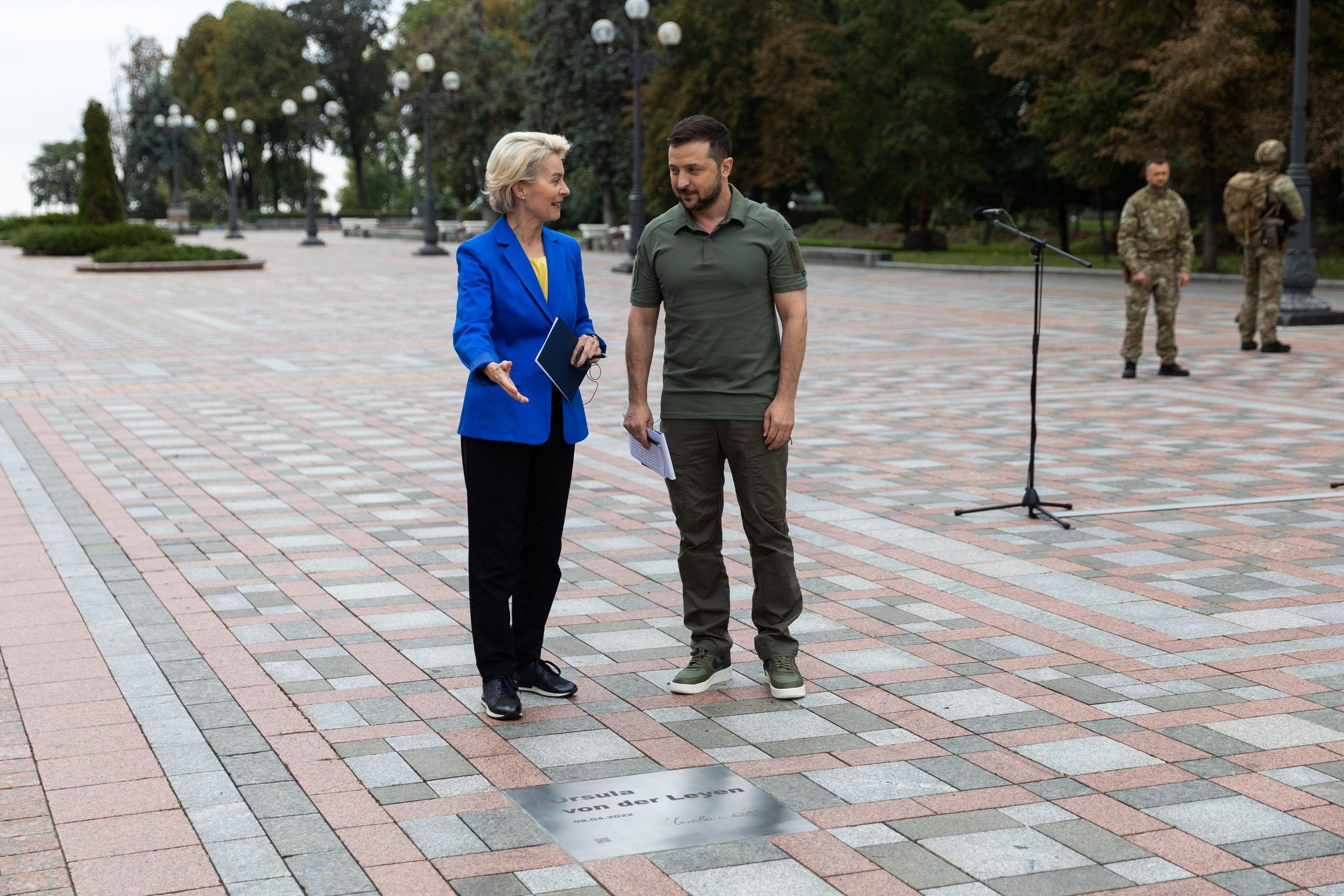
Meeting of the President of Ukraine with the President of the European Commission

== List of leaders who are honored on the Walk of the Brave ==
| Name | Title | Country | Date |
|---|---|---|---|
| Andrzej Duda | President of Poland | Poland | April 13, 2022 |
| Boris Johnson | Prime Minister of the United Kingdom | United Kingdom | April 9, 2022 |
| Egils Levits | President of Latvia | Latvia | April 13, 2022 |
| Petr Fiala | Prime Minister of the Czech Republic | Czech Republic | March 15, 2022 |
| Janez Janša | Prime Minister of Slovenia | Slovenia | March 15, 2022 |
| Jarosław Kaczyński | Deputy Prime Minister of Poland | Poland | March 15, 2022 |
| Mateusz Morawiecki | Prime Minister of Poland | Poland | March 15, 2022 |
| Ursula von der Leyen | President of the European Commission | European Union | April 8, 2022 |
| Roberta Metsola | President of the European Parliament | European Union | April 1, 2022 |
| Micheál Martin | Prime Minister of Ireland | Ireland | July 6, 2022 |
| Charles Michel | President of the European Council | European Union | April 20, 2022 |
| Mette Frederiksen | Prime Minister of Denmark | Denmark | April 21, 2022 |
| Andrej Plenković | Prime Minister of Croatia | Croatia | May 8, 2022 |
| Magdalena Andersson | Prime Minister of Sweden | Sweden | April 7, 2022 |
| Gitanas Nausėda | President of Lithuania | Lithuania | April 13, 2022 |
| Karl Nehammer | Chancellor of Austria | Austria | April 9, 2022 |
| António Costa | Prime Minister of Portugal | Portugal | May 21, 2022 |
| Alar Karis | President of Estonia | Estonia | April 13, 2022 |
| Justin Trudeau | Prime Minister of Canada | Canada | May 9, 2022 |
| Sean Penn | Actor and filmmaker | United States | February 24, 2022 |
| José Andrés | Chef and restaurateur | United StatesSpain | March 29, 2022 |
| Ināra Mūrniece | Speaker of the Saeima | Latvia | March 23, 2022 |
| Jüri Ratas | President of Riigikogu | Estonia | March 24, 2022 |
| Viktorija Čmilytė-Nielsen | Speaker of the Seimas | Lithuania | March 24, 2022 |
| Zuzana Čaputová | President of Slovakia | Slovakia | May 31, 2022 |
| Edi Rama | Prime Minister of Albania | Albania | June 15, 2022 |
| Justin Trudeau | Prime Minister of Canada | Canada | May 9, 2022 |
| Ingrida Šimonytė | Prime Minister of Lithuania | Lithuania | April 11, 2022 |
| Mark Rutte | Prime Minister of the Netherlands | Netherlands | July 11, 2022 |
| Pedro Sánchez | Prime Minister of Spain | Spain | April 21, 2022 |
| Antony Blinken | United States Secretary of State | United States | April 25, 2022 |
| António Guterres | Secretary-General of the United Nations | United Nations | March 24, 2022 |
| Xavier Bettel | Prime Minister of Luxembourg | Luxembourg | June 21, 2022 |
| Ben Wallace | Secretary of State for Defence | United Kingdom | June 10, 2022 |
| Olaf Scholz | Chancellor of Germany | Germany | June 16, 2022 |
| Emmanuel Macron | President of France | France | June 16, 2022 |
| Alejandro Giammattei | President of Guatemala | Guatemala | July 25, 2022 |
| Maia Sandu | President of Moldova | Moldova | June 27, 2022 |
| Mario Draghi | Prime Minister of Italy | Italy | June 16, 2022 |
| Richard Branson | founder of the Virgin Group Aid to Ukraine | United Kingdom | June 29, 2022 |
| Anthony Albanese | Prime Minister of Australia | Australia | July 3, 2022 |
| Kiril Petkov | Prime Minister of Bulgaria | Bulgaria | April 28, 2022 |
| Dritan Abazović | Prime Minister of Montenegro | Montenegro | June 15, 2022 |
| Joe Biden | President of the United States | United States | February 24, 2022 |
| Jonas Gahr Støre | Prime Minister of Norway | Norway | July 1, 2022 |
| Klaus Iohannis | President of Romania | Romania | June 16, 2022 |
| Howard Graham Buffett | Chairman and CEO of the Howard G. Buffett Foundation | United States | June 21, 2022 |

== See also ==
- Government and intergovernmental reactions to the 2022 Russian invasion of Ukraine
- United24
- Be Brave Like Ukraine
