= RV/MH Hall of Fame =

Museum in Indiana, United States

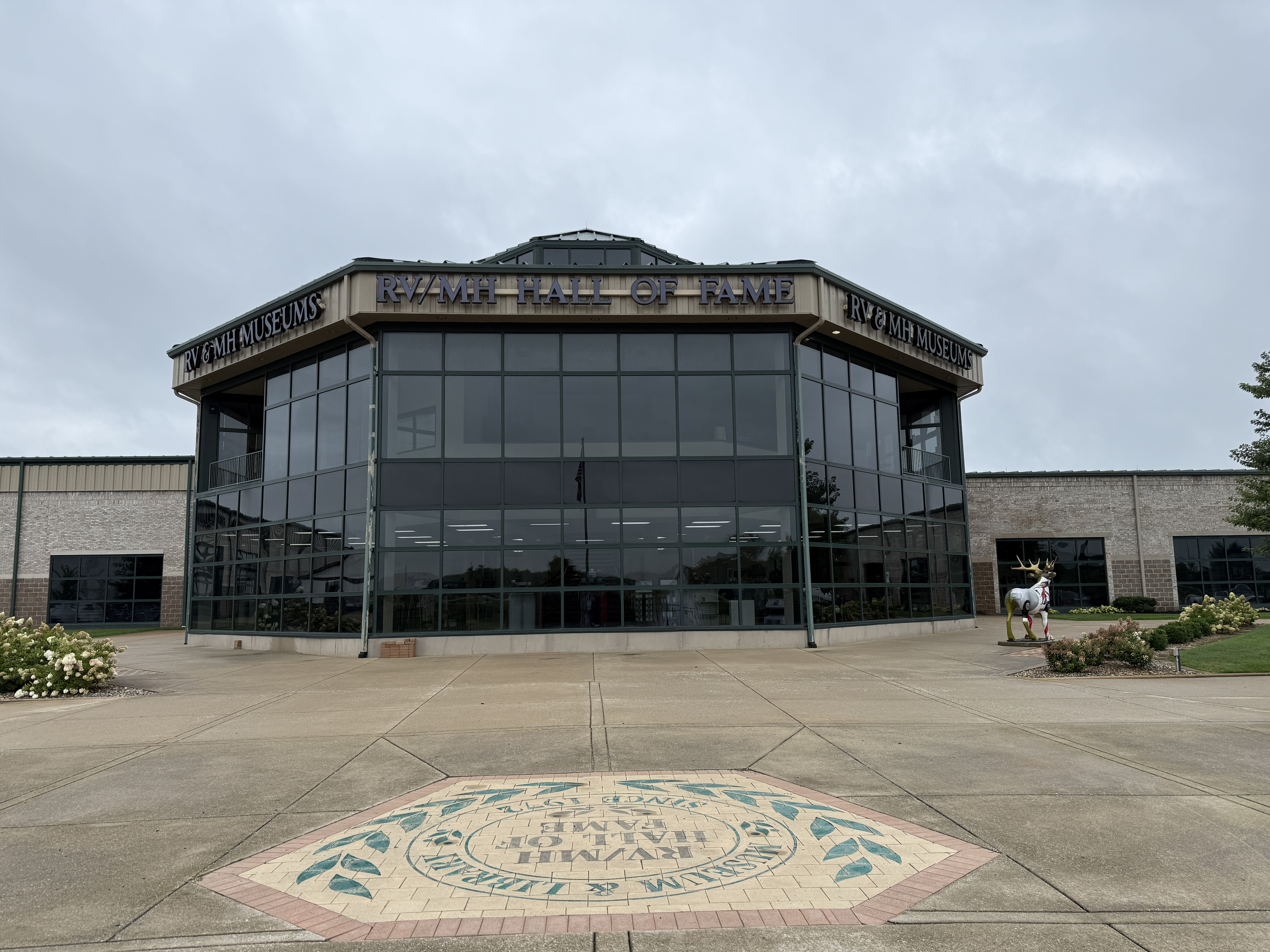
- Established: 1991
- Location: 21565 Executive Parkway; Elkhart, Indiana
- Coordinates: 41.729122°N 85.878456°W
- Type: Automobile
- Website: http://www.rvmhhalloffame.org

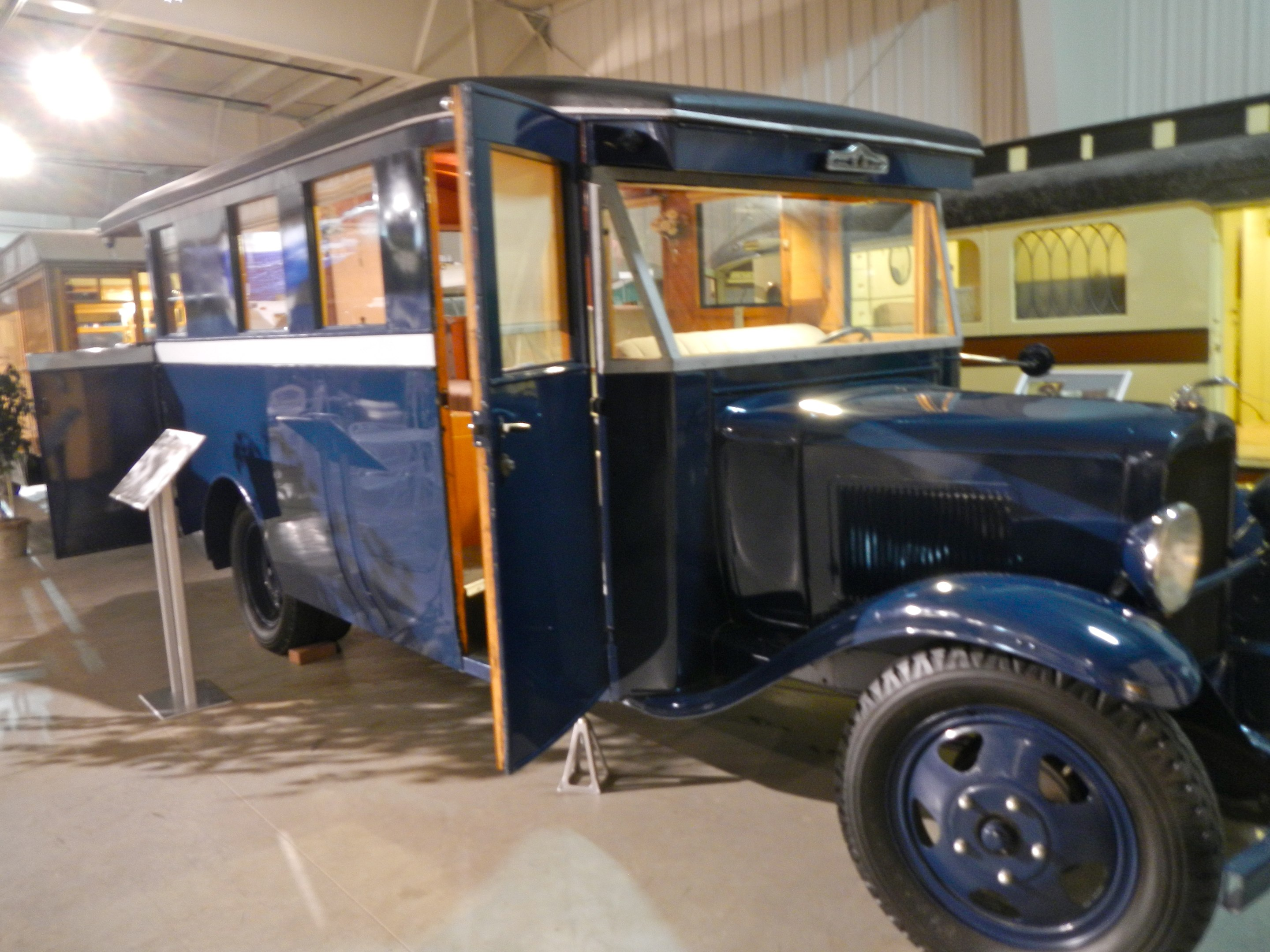
Mae West's RV (c. 1931)

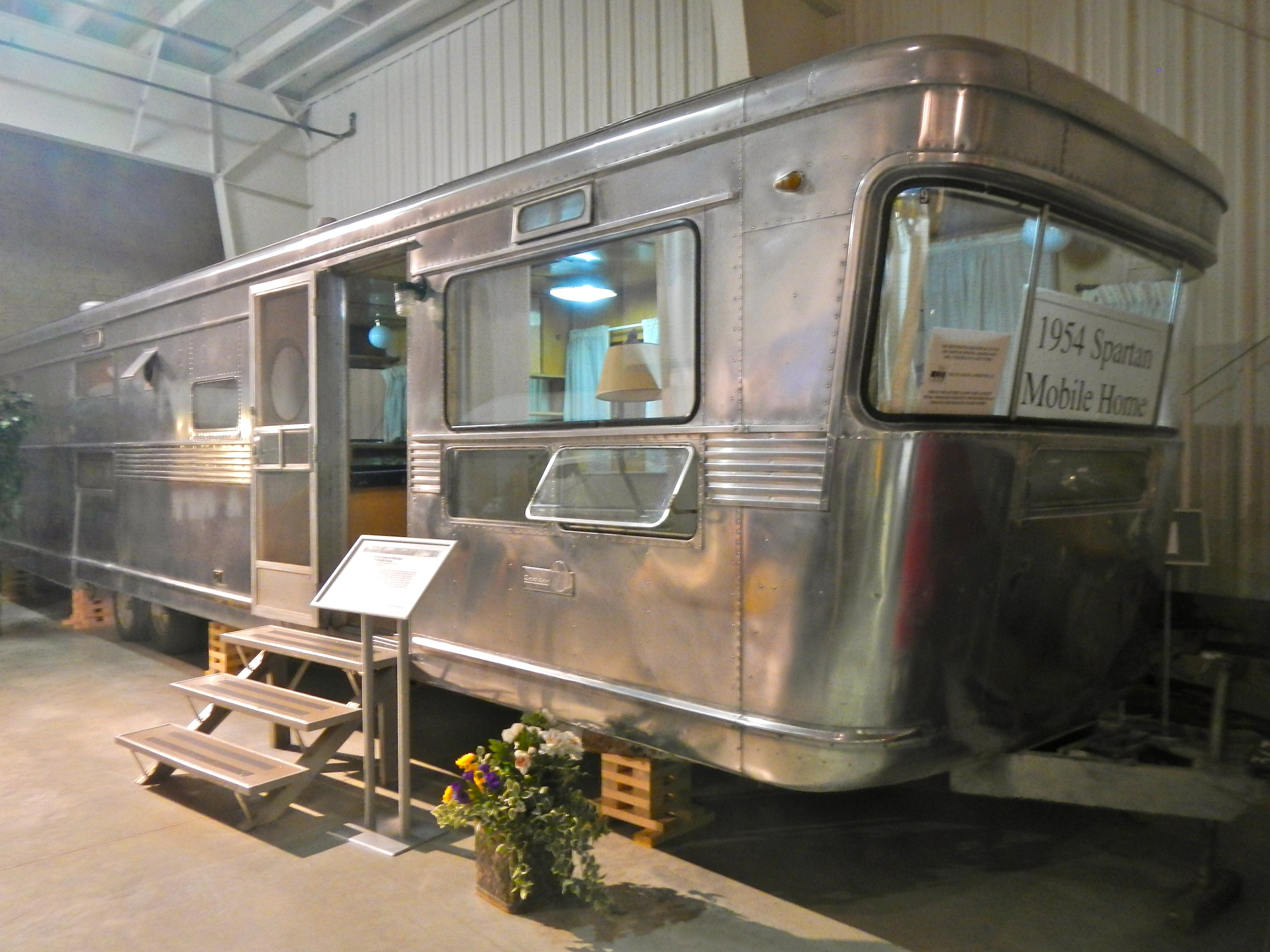
1954 Spartan mobile home

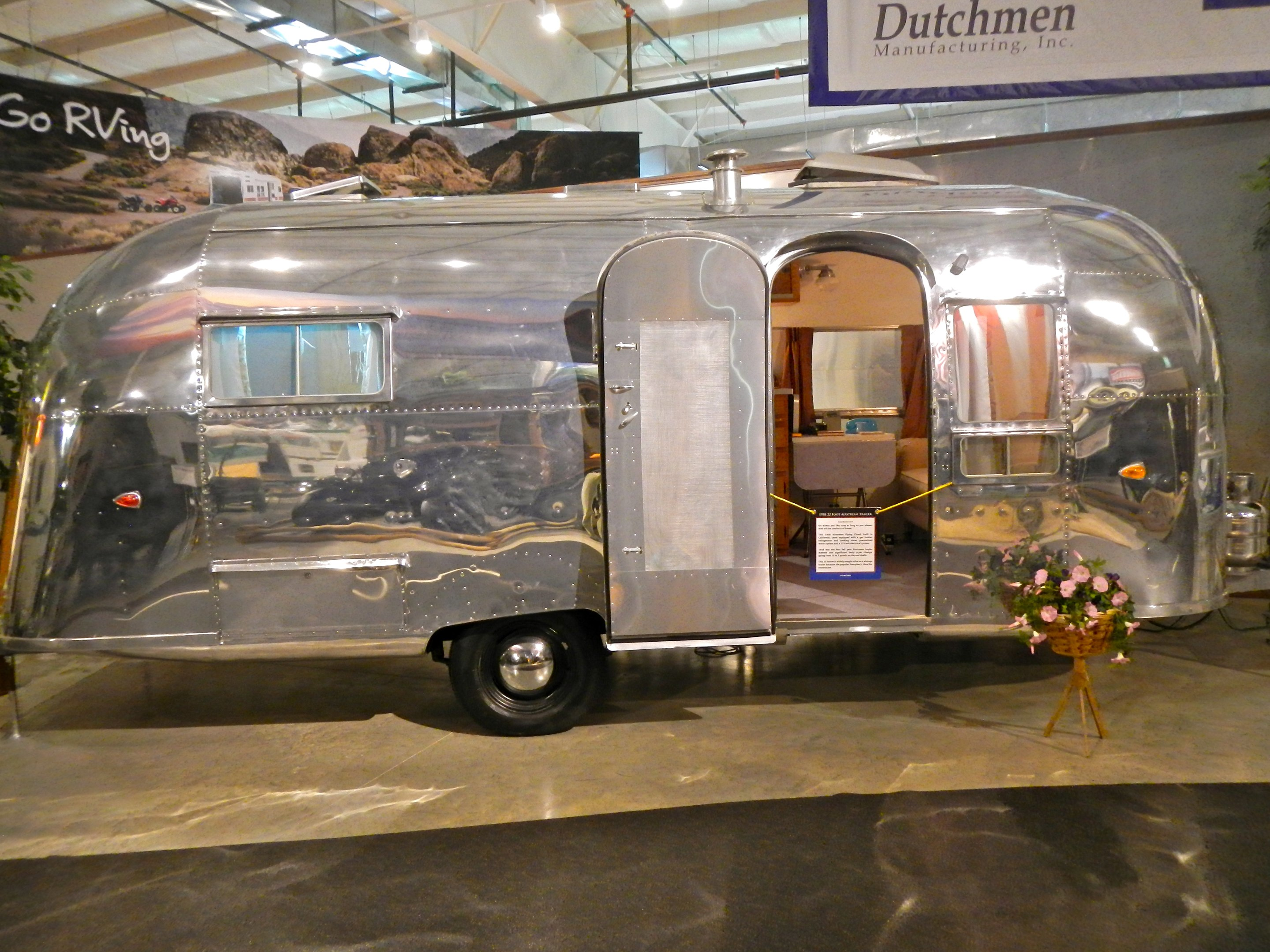
1958 Airstream

The RV/MH Hall of Fame is a 100,000-square-foot (9,300 m^{2}) museum in Elkhart, Indiana that features a variety of historical recreational vehicles from Airstream, Winnebago and other American makers. The foundation states that their primary goals are to "To create a display of historic RV/MH products in a museum for the education and enjoyment of the public."

== History ==
Founded in 1972 as the Recreational Vehicle/Manufactured Housing Heritage Foundation, the museum opened in 1991 and in 2007, moved into its current location. The foundation is a non-profit organization and relies on donations from a variety of sources.

== Features ==
The museum is located just off Interstate 80 near Elkhart and features pull through parking for RV travelers, which comprise a portion of the visitors. The primary building, Founders Hall, is complete with artificial trees and other plants to create a simulated RV campground.

The museum features a variety of recreation vehicles dating back 100 years and continuing through the 1980s. The oldest vehicle on display is a 1913 Earl Travel Trailer and is the oldest surviving specimen known. The museum is divided into areas that highlight key events in the history of RVs, such as the introduction of the first microwave oven, the first indoor toilet and other features. Vehicles from the 1980s on are displayed at the Go RVing exhibition hall, within walking distance of the museum.

One of the vehicles on display is the 1931 Chevrolet Housecar that was offered as a bribe to Mae West by Paramount Pictures, to persuade her to make movies. The oldest Winnebago and the smallest Airstream ever built are also to be found in the museum.

== See also ==
- Camping
- Mobile home
