= Walk of the Amazon Heroes =

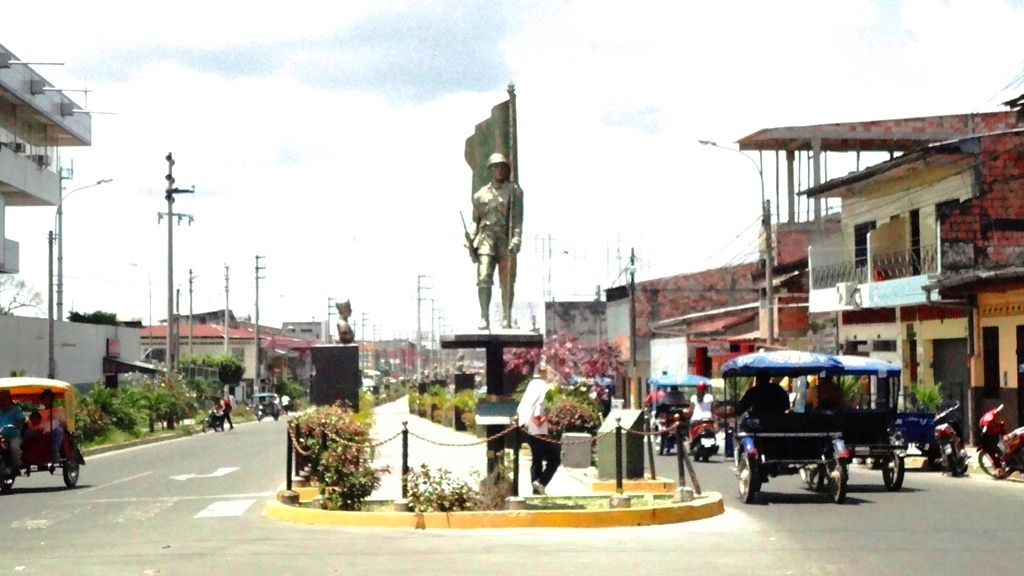
- Interactive map of Walk of the Amazon Heroes
- Type: Boulevard median
- Location: Peru, Iquitos
- Area: Width: 4.20 meters Length: 1,995 meters
- Created: 08:00, January 4, 2010 (−05:00)
- Operator: Maynas Municipality, Iquitos
- Visitors: Recurrent
- Status: Open all eyer, public site

The Walk of the Amazon Heroes (Spanish: Paseo de los Héroes Amazónicos, Spanish pronunciation: [paˈseo ðe los ˈeɾoes amaˈsonikos]) is a museological boulevard median, only pedestrian, along Avenue Mariscal Cáceres in Iquitos, Loreto, Peru. It is a recent place in the city. It was built around 2009 and opened in early 2010. It is mainly dedicated to the heroes who gave their lives to protect the Amazonian people during the various battles, including those in Güeppí.

The Walk is a type of boulevard-median of 4 meters in central of Avenue, which separates the two-lane road East and West, with a slab path and sides decorated with 40 busts of heroes on pedestals, in addition to 43 lamps, ornamental flower gardens and some seats sheltered by small transparent awnings. During the night, each bust gets its own lighting: a focus located across the bust, the other side. The walk begins tangent at Avenue Miguel Grau with the statue of a soldier holding the Flag of Peru, and in turn, rests on a pedestal largest, known as The Unknown Soldier (El Soldado Desconocido). The edges of the walk are protected by balustrades chain to prevent pedestrians walked over the gardens. The current two-lane road East and West, measuring 5 meters, improving traffic.

Only four long blocks of the walk is decorated with busts (up the street Ramón Castilla), continuing the following parts of the pavement (without them, but with the same care ornamental) to reach the coastal street of Lake Moronocha's Caballero Lastre, one of the western confine of Iquitos.
