= Vídeo Show Walk of Fame =

The Video Show Walk of Fame is a walk of fame that is promoted by the television program Vídeo Show which airs on Rede Globo. Artist mold their hands and signature in a block of cement, following the same methods of the famous Walk of Fame of Grauman's Chinese Theatre in Hollywood.

The Walk of Fame debuted with the new format on November 18, 2013. The journalist Zeca Camargo is the current presenter of the program.

Each concrete block will be part of a future Hall of Fame, which will be located at the studios of Globo (Projac) in the Rio de Janeiro. The theme song is "Love's Theme" by The Love Unlimited Orchestra.

The single had a different track, was Renata Ceribelli. The song was "New York City" by Frank Sinatra, in reference to that will make your trip to the United States to make a television journalism (from Fantástico) in the country.

== Names ==
- Susana Vieira – on November 18, 2013.
- Flávia Alessandra – on November 19, 2013.
- Lília Cabral – on November 20, 2013.
- Débora Nascimento – on November 21, 2013.
- Marcelo Adnet – on November 22, 2013.
- Marisa Orth – on November 25, 2013.
- Marcelo Serrado – on November 26, 2013.
- Fabiana Karla – on November 27, 2013.
- Alexandre Borges – on November 28, 2013.
- Murilo Rosa – on November 29, 2013.
- Paola Oliveira – on December 2, 2013.
- Rodrigo Lombardi – on December 3, 2013.
- Leandra Leal – on December 4, 2013.
- Fábio Porchat – on December 5, 2013.
- there was no editing on Dec. 6
- Bárbara Paz – on December 9, 2013.
- Cleo Pires – on December 10, 2013.
- Sheron Menezzes – on December 11, 2013.
- Fernanda Souza – on December 12, 2013.
- there was no editing on Dec. 13.
- Ricardo Tozzi – on December 16, 2013.
- Deborah Secco – on December 17, 2013.
- Ricardo Pereira – on December 18, 2013.
- Eliane Giardini – on December 19, 2013.
- Nelson Freitas – on December 20, 2013.
- Márcio Garcia – on December 23, 2013.
- Leandro Hassum – on December 24, 2013.
- Marcos Caruso – on December 25, 2013.
- Fernanda Machado – on December 26, 2013.
- Daniel Boaventura – on December 27, 2013.
- There was no display on December 30, 2013.
- Renata Ceribelli – on December 31, 2013.
- Sandy – on January 1, 2014.
- Betty Faria – on January 2, 2014.
- Evandro Mesquita – on January 3, 2014.
- Marcos Pasquim – on January 6, 2014.
- Marcello Novaes – on January 7, 2014.
- Alessandra Negrini – on January 9, 2014.
- Fernanda Vasconcellos – on January 10, 2014.
- Domingos Montagner – on January 13, 2014.
- Kadu Moliterno – on January 14, 2014.
- Letícia Spiller – on January 15, 2014.
- There was no display on January 16, 2014.
- Cristiana Oliveira – on January 17, 2014.
- José de Abreu – on January 20, 2014.
- Arlete Salles – on January 21, 2014.
- Emílio Orciollo Netto – on January 22, 2014.
- Maitê Proença – on January 23, 2014.
- Naldo Benny – on January 24, 2014.
- Diogo Vilela – on January 27, 2014.
- Paulo Vilhena – on January 28, 2014.
- Carolina Kasting – on January 29, 2014.
- Carol Castro – on January 30, 2014.
- There was no display on January 31, 2014.
- Caio Blat – on February 3, 2014.
- Tiago Abravanel – on February 5, 2014.
- Danielle Winits – on February 6, 2014.
- Elke Maravilha – on February 7, 2014.
- Felipe Camargo – on February 8, 2014.
- Nívea Stelmann – on February 11, 2014.
- Caco Ciocler – on February 12, 2014.
- Isabela Garcia – on February 13, 2014.
- Luiz Carlos Miéle – on February 14, 2014.
- Adriana Esteves – on February 17, 2014.
- Nathalia Dill – on February 18, 2014.
- Cláudia Raia – on February 19, 2014.
