= 1933 in rail transport =

This article lists events related to rail transport that occurred in 1933.

== Events ==
=== January events ===
- January – London Underground diagram designed by Harry Beck introduced to public.
- January 1 – The Southern Railway's Southern Belle, a Pullman train running between London and Brighton, England, is re-equipped with electric multiple unit cars to replace steam power.
- January 23 – San Diego and Arizona Railway's bypass around tunnel 7, which was destroyed by fire, opens.
- January 31–April 7 – A strike disrupts rail transport in Northern Ireland. The Castlederg and Victoria Bridge Tramway ceases operation permanently.

=== February events ===
- February 1 – The San Diego and Arizona Eastern Railway is incorporated and assumes all operations of the San Diego and Arizona Railway.
- February 24 – Sanin Line, Kyoto via Toyooka, Yonago, East Hagi to Hatabu of Shimonoseki route officially completed in Japan.

=== April events ===
- April 11 – The Great Western Railway initiates an air service between Cardiff and Plymouth (Great Britain), using Westland Wessex aircraft chartered from Imperial Airways.

=== May events ===
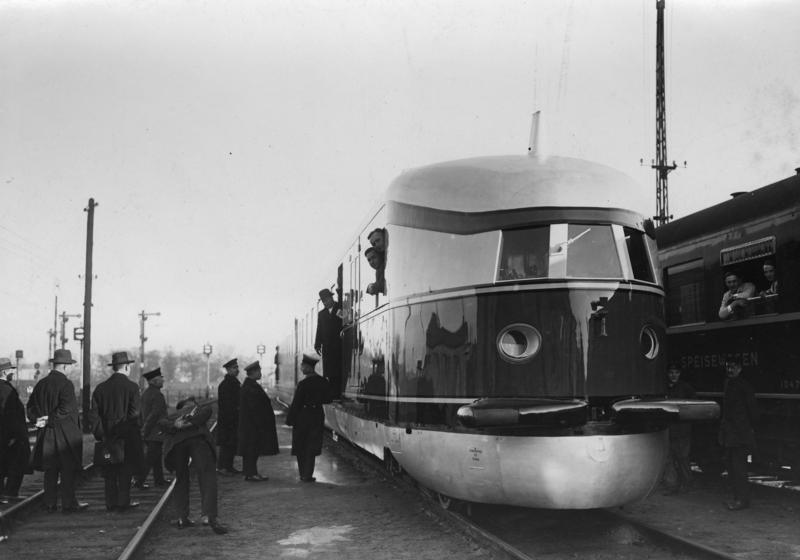
Fliegender Hamburger

- May 2 – Samuel T. Bledsoe succeeds William Benson Storey as president of Atchison, Topeka and Santa Fe Railway.
- May 15 – Deutsche Reichsbahn-Gesellschaft puts the Fliegender Hamburger Multiple unit into service. It shortens the distance of 286 km (178 mi) between Hamburg and Berlin Lehrter Bahnhof to 138 minutes. The average speed was 124 km/h (77 mph).
- May 20 – A first section of Osaka Municipal Subway, Umeda to Shinsaibashi, part of Midosuji Line route officially completed in Japan.

=== June events ===
- June 15 – The last scheduled train run on the narrow gauge Wiscasset, Waterville and Farmington Railway ends with a derailment in Whitefield, Maine.
- June 25 – Canadian Pacific Railway discontinues the use of the Imperial Limited name, although the trains continue to run designated now by train numbers only.
- June 29 – Portland–Lewiston Interurban ends regular service on its line in Maine.

=== July events ===
- July 15 – The Atlantic City Railroad changes its name to Pennsylvania-Reading Seashore Lines.
- July 22 – The Maine Central Railroad ends train service to the Mount Kineo House destination hotel on Moosehead Lake.

=== August events ===
- August 15 – The first broadcast of the passing “Pan American” on radio station WSM. This will become a daily feature, popularizing “train” rhythms in country music, a Hank Williams song and making celebrities out of the Louisville & Nashville crews.

=== September events ===
- September 30 – Chicago South Shore and South Bend Railroad enters receivership; Samuel Insull is forced out of the railroad's presidency.

=== October events ===
- October 11 – London, Midland and Scottish Railway 4-6-0 Royal Scot number 6152 (of the LMS Royal Scot Class locomotives) departs the Century of Progress Exposition in Chicago, bound for Vancouver, British Columbia.

=== November events ===
- November 9 – Canadian National Railway's line to Lynn Lake, Manitoba, opens.

=== December events ===
- December 24 – Lagny-Pomponne rail accident: A collision between Lagny-sur-Marne and Pomponne (east of Paris) leaves 204 dead in the second worst railroad disaster in French history.

=== Unknown date events ===
- The Cache-Two Rivers trestle on the Ottawa, Arnprior & Parry Sound Railway is severely damaged by flood waters. Repairs prove too costly and it is closed, effectively cutting the railway into two pieces, leading to its demise in 1959.

== Deaths ==
- December 19 - George Jackson Churchward, former Chief mechanical engineer of the Great Western Railway of England 1902–1922, is struck down by one of his own locomotives at Swindon (born 1857).
