= DCPL =

DCPL may refer to:

- DeKalb County Public Library
- District of Columbia Public Library
- Dodge City Public Library
