= Dodge City, Kansas =

- City and county seat
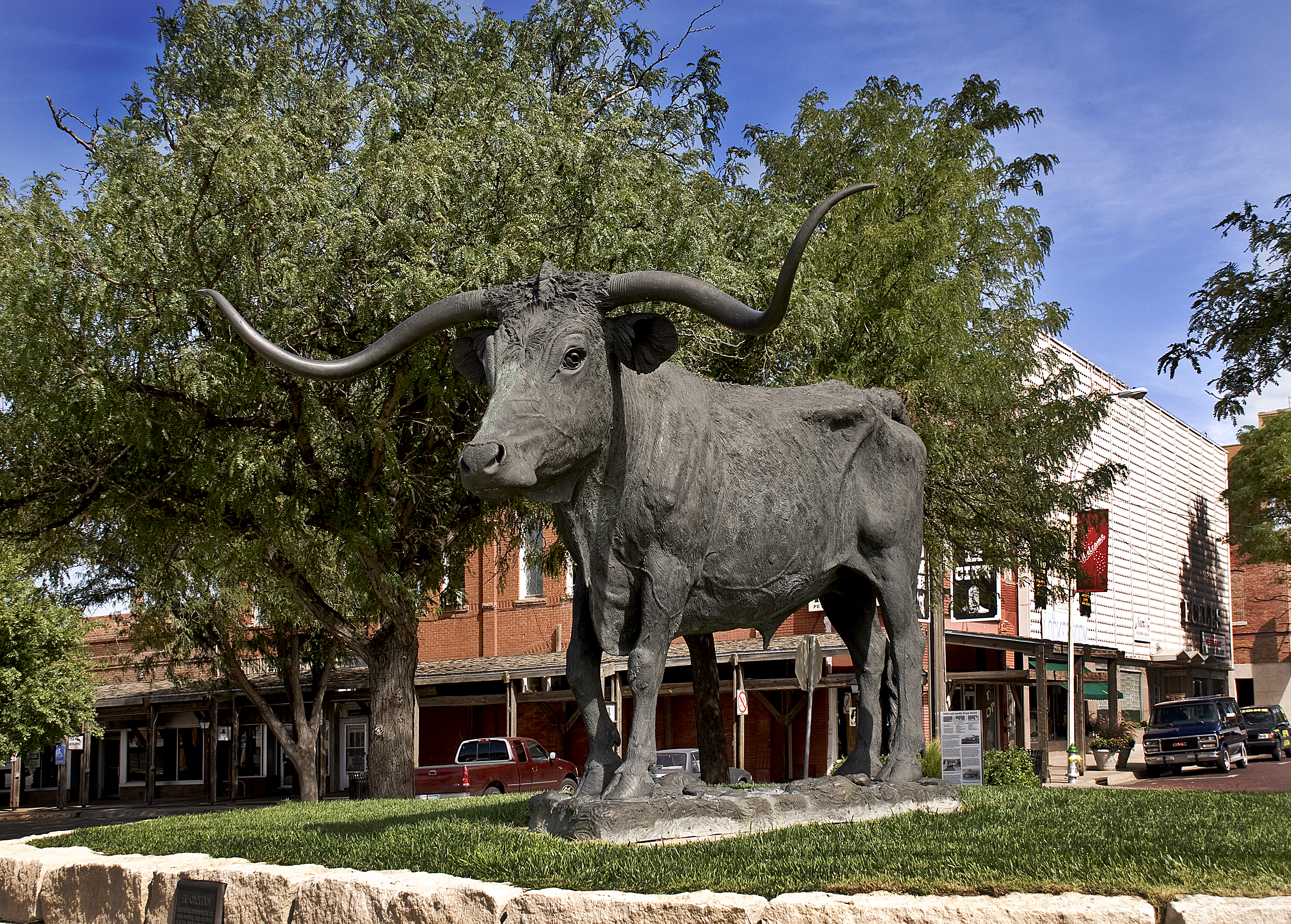
- El Capitan cattle drive monument (2008)

- Flag Seal
- Nicknames: "Cowboy Capital of The World"; "Wicked Little City"; "King of Cowtowns"
- Motto(s): "Get The Heck Into Dodge"; "The Wickedest Little City in America"
- Location within Ford County and Kansas

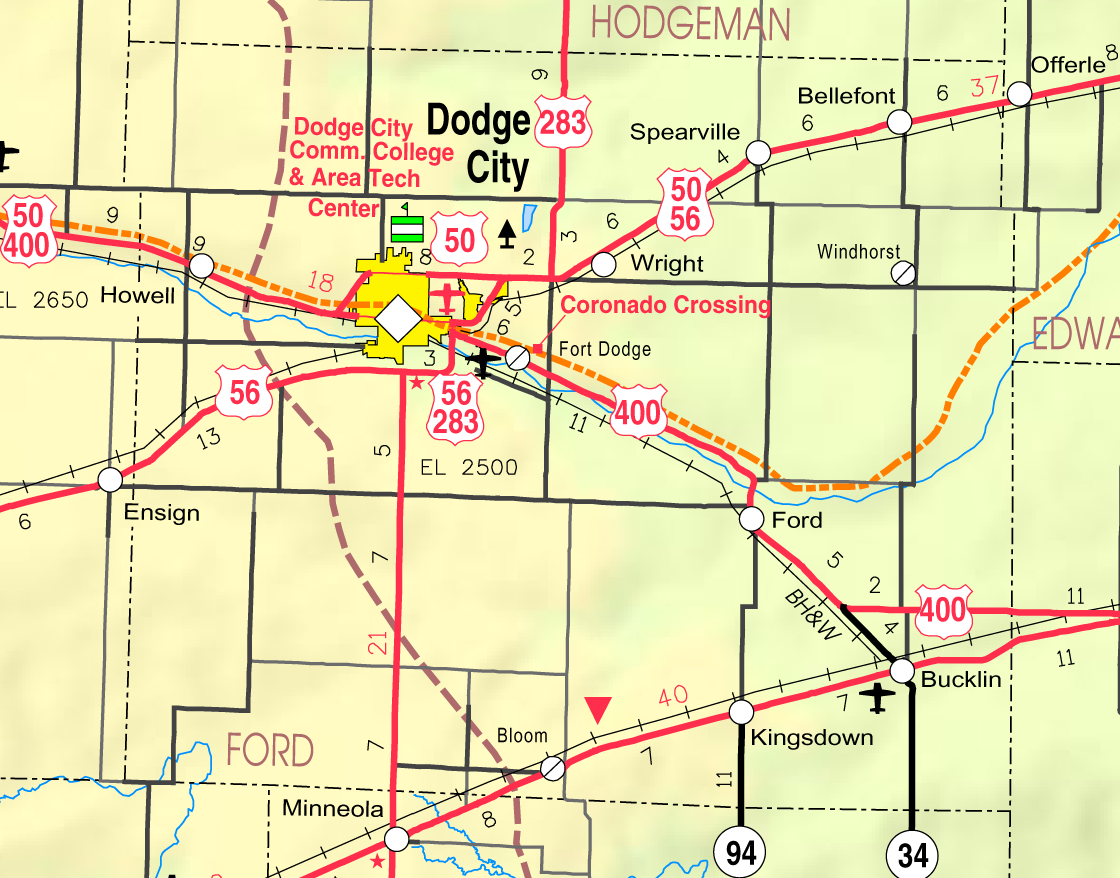
- KDOT map of Ford County (legend)
- Coordinates: 37°45′40″N 100°01′06″W
- Country: United States
- State: Kansas
- County: Ford
- Founded: 1872
- Incorporated: 1875
- Named for: Fort Dodge

Government
  - Mayor: Jeff Reinert

Area
  - Total: 14.76 sq mi (38.24 km^{2})
  - Land: 14.66 sq mi (37.97 km^{2})
  - Water: 0.10 sq mi (0.27 km^{2})
- Elevation: 2,559 ft (780 m)

Population (2020)
  - Total: 27,788
  - Density: 1,895/sq mi (731.8/km^{2})
- Time zone: UTC−6 (CST)
  - Summer (DST): UTC−5 (CDT)
- ZIP Codes: 67801, 67843
- Area code: 620
- FIPS code: 20-18250
- GNIS ID: 485563
- Website: dodgecity.org

Dodge City is a city in and the county seat of Ford County, Kansas, United States. As of the 2020 census, the population of the city was 27,788. It was named after nearby Fort Dodge, which was named in honor of Grenville Dodge. The city is known in American culture for its history as a wild frontier town of the Old West.

== History ==
The first settlement in the area that became Dodge City was Fort Mann, built by civilians in 1847. The fort was built to provide protection for travelers on the Santa Fe Trail. Fort Mann collapsed in 1848 after an attack by Natives. In 1850, the U.S. Army arrived to provide protection in the region and constructed Fort Atkinson on the old Fort Mann site. The army abandoned Fort Atkinson in 1853. Military forces on the Santa Fe Trail were re-established farther north and east at Fort Larned in 1859, but the area remained vacant around what would become Dodge City until the end of the Civil War. In April 1865, the American Frontier Wars in the West began heating up, and the army constructed Fort Dodge to assist Fort Larned in providing protection on the Santa Fe Trail. Fort Dodge remained in operation until 1882.

The town of Dodge City can trace its origins to 1871, when rancher Henry L. Sitler built a sod house west of Fort Dodge to oversee his cattle operations in the region, conveniently located near the Santa Fe Trail and Arkansas River, and Sitler's house quickly became a stopping point for travelers. Others saw the commercial potential of the region with the Santa Fe Railroad rapidly approaching from the east. In 1872, Dodge City was staked out on the 100th meridian and the legal western boundary of the Fort Dodge reservation. The town site was platted and George M. Hoover established the first bar in a tent to serve thirsty soldiers from Fort Dodge. The railroad arrived in September to find a town ready and waiting for business. The early settlers in Dodge City traded in buffalo bones and hides and provided a civilian community for Fort Dodge. With the arrival of the railroad, Dodge City soon became involved in the cattle trade.

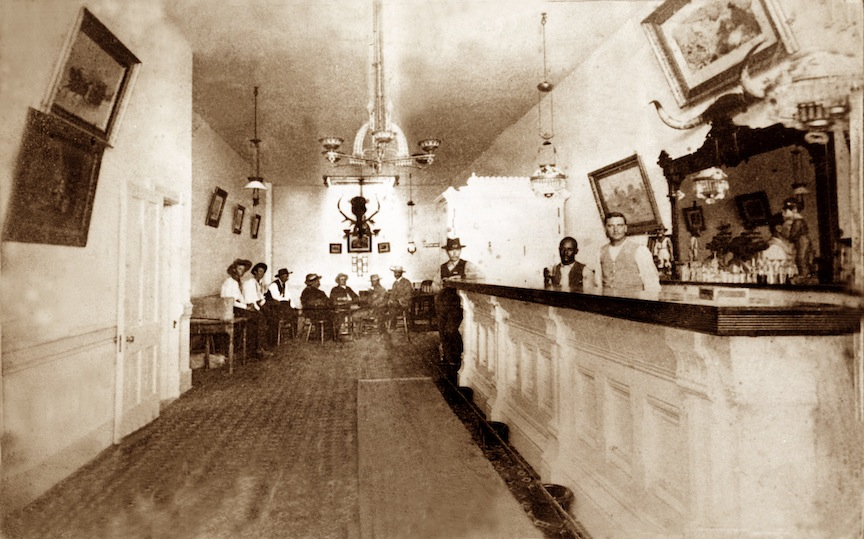
The interior of the real Long Branch Saloon in Dodge City, Kansas, photographed between 1870 and 1885

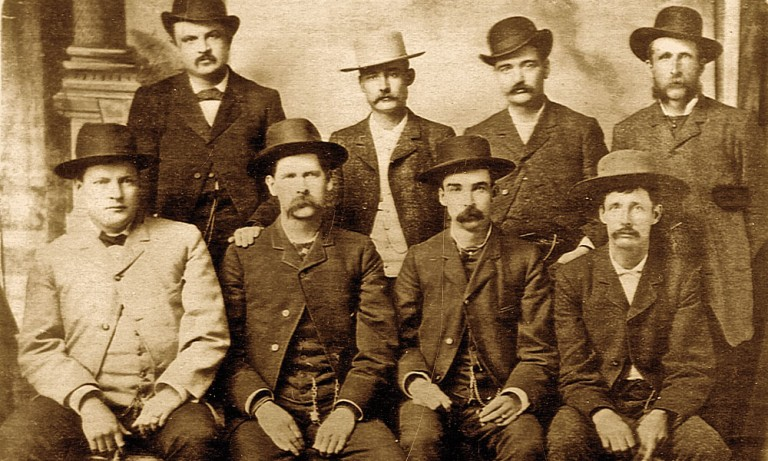
The "Dodge City Peace Commission" on June 10, 1883. From left to right, standing: William H. Harris, Luke Short, Bat Masterson, William F. Petillon; seated: Charlie Bassett, Wyatt Earp, Michael Francis "Frank" McLean, Cornelius "Neil" Brown.

Dodge City in 1875 with the Beatty and Kelley Restaurant at the corner of First Avenue and Front Street

The idea of driving Texas Longhorn cattle from Texas to railheads in Kansas originated in the late 1850s, but was cut short by the Civil War. In 1866, the first Texas cattle started arriving in Baxter Springs in southeastern Kansas by way of the Shawnee Trail. Texas Longhorn cattle carried a tick that spread Texas cattle fever, among other breeds of cattle. Alarmed Kansas farmers persuaded the Kansas State Legislature to establish a quarantine line in central Kansas. The quarantine prohibited Texas Longhorns from the heavily settled, eastern portion of the state.

Like many Kansas cattle towns, Dodge City enforced segregation of business and residential districts along race lines as well as morality (containing "vice industries") and economic status. There was a number of black cowboys who commanded some respect, but attitudes towards people of color varied and were ambivalent.

With the cattle trade forced west, Texas Longhorns began moving north along the Chisholm Trail. In 1867, the main cowtown was Abilene, Kansas. Profits were high, and other towns quickly joined in the cattle boom: Newton in 1871, Ellsworth in 1872, and Wichita in 1872. In 1876, however, the Kansas State Legislature responded to pressure from farmers settling in central Kansas and once again shifted the quarantine line westward, which essentially eliminated Abilene and the other cowtowns from the cattle trade. With no place else to go, Dodge City suddenly became the "queen of the cow towns."

A new route known as the Great Western Cattle Trail or Western Trail branched off from the Chisholm Trail to lead cattle into Dodge City. Dodge City became a boomtown, with thousands of cattle passing annually through its stockyards. The peak years of the cattle trade in Dodge City were from 1883 to 1884, and during that time the town grew tremendously. In 1880, Dodge City got a new competitor for the cattle trade from the border town of Caldwell. For a few years, the competition between the towns was fierce, but enough cattle were available for both towns to prosper.

Dodge City became known as a true frontier settlement of the Old West. Dodge City had more gunfighters working at one time or another than any other town in the West, many of whom participated in the Dodge City War of 1883. It had saloons, gambling halls, and brothels, including the Long Branch Saloon and China Doll brothel. For a time in 1884, Dodge City had a bullfighting ring where Mexican bullfighters would put on a show with specially chosen Longhorn bulls. As more agricultural settlers moved into western Kansas, pressure increased on the Kansas State Legislature to do something about splenic fever, known today as anthrax. Consequently, in 1885, the quarantine line was extended across the state and the Western Trail was all but shut down.

By the mid-1880s, Dodge City began working to change its image away from that of a violent western town and towards that of a more peaceful and civilized location. In 1878, for example, the bodies in the notorious "Boot Hill" cemetery were moved to the newly established Prairie Grove Cemetery, and a new schoolhouse was built on Boot Hill. In 1907 Andrew Carnegie donated money for the construction of a new public library in Dodge City.

Dodge City was also a significant hub for racing for many years, and it held the first World Championship 300 Mile Motorcycle Race on July 4, 1914. Notable attendees included William Harley and Walter Davidson, who adopted the "hog" as a mascot after one of their riders, Ray Weishaar, brought a piglet from his farm with him to the race. Motorcycle races continued in Dodge City into the 1950s, and attracted significant talent throughout this time, though Dodge's prominence as a hub for motorcycle racing would gradually fade over time. Dodge City was also a site for automobile races, with racers such as Carroll Shelby taking part in the events.

== Geography ==
Dodge City lies on the Arkansas River in the High Plains region of the Great Plains. The city sits above one of the world's largest underground water systems, the Ogallala Aquifer, and is 25 miles (40 km) from the eastern edge of the Hugoton Natural Gas Area. Located at the intersection of U. S. Routes 50, 56 and 283 in southwestern Kansas, Dodge City is 151 mi (243 km) west of Wichita, 199 mi (320 km) northeast of Amarillo, and 301 mi (484 km) southeast of Denver.

According to the United States Census Bureau, the city has a total area of 14.55 square miles (37.68 km^{2}), of which 14.44 square miles (37.40 km^{2}) is land and 0.11 square miles (0.28 km^{2}) is water.

=== Climate ===
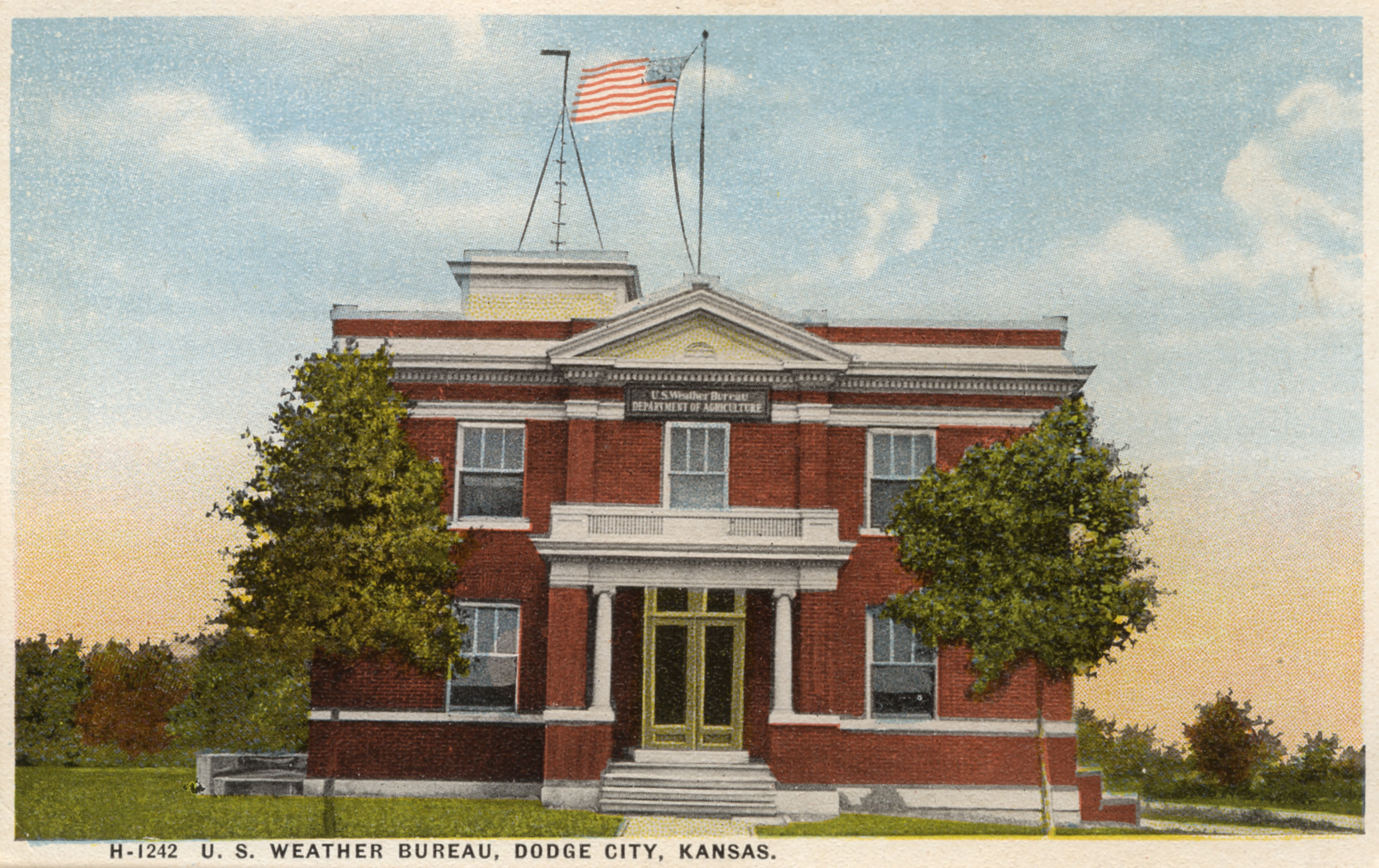
US Weather Bureau c. 1900

Dodge City lies at the intersection of North America's semi-arid (Köppen BSk) and humid subtropical climate (Köppen Cfa) zones, with hot summers, highly variable winters, both warm and very cold periods, and low to moderate humidity and precipitation throughout the year; it is part of USDA Hardiness zone 6b. Areas to the west are drier and more strongly semi-arid. Severe weather, including tornadoes, is common in the area, especially in the spring months. Dodge City is often cited as the windiest city in the United States with an average speed of 13.9 mph (22.4 km/h), which results in occasional blizzards in the winter, even when snowfall does not accumulate much. On average, January is the coldest month, July is the hottest month, and June is the wettest month.

The high temperature reaches or exceeds 90 °F (32.2 °C) an average of 71 days a year and reaches or exceeds 100 °F (37.8 °C) an average of 14 days a year; the last year that failed to reach 100 °F (37.8 °C) was 1958. The minimum temperature falls to or below 0 °F (−18 °C) an average of 2.1 days a year. The highest officially recorded temperature was 111 °F (44 °C) on June 27, 2012, while the lowest temperature officially recorded was −26 °F (−32 °C) on February 12, 1899. The record cold daily maximum is −13 °F (−25 °C) on January 13, 1875, and conversely, the record warm daily minimum is 83 °F (28 °C) last set June 13, 2022.

Climate data for Dodge City Regional Airport, Kansas (1991–2020 normals, (Note: Mean monthly maxima and minima (i.e. the expected highest and lowest temperature readings at any point during the year or given month) calculated based on data at said location from 1991 to 2020.) extremes 1874–present) (Note: Official temperature records for Dodge City kept downtown from September 15, 1874, to June 1942 and at Dodge City Regional Airport since July 1942. Precipitation, snowfall, and snow depth records date from October 1, 1874, January 1, 1893, and January 1, 1948, respectively.)
| Month | Jan | Feb | Mar | Apr | May | Jun | Jul | Aug | Sep | Oct | Nov | Dec | Year |
|---|---|---|---|---|---|---|---|---|---|---|---|---|---|
| Record high °F (°C) | 80 (27) | 88 (31) | 98 (37) | 100 (38) | 106 (41) | 111 (44) | 109 (43) | 109 (43) | 107 (42) | 101 (38) | 91 (33) | 86 (30) | 111 (44) |
| Mean maximum °F (°C) | 68.1 (20.1) | 74.8 (23.8) | 82.7 (28.2) | 89.6 (32.0) | 95.0 (35.0) | 100.4 (38.0) | 104.1 (40.1) | 102.0 (38.9) | 98.3 (36.8) | 91.2 (32.9) | 77.5 (25.3) | 67.3 (19.6) | 105.1 (40.6) |
| Mean daily maximum °F (°C) | 45.6 (7.6) | 49.4 (9.7) | 59.6 (15.3) | 68.5 (20.3) | 78.3 (25.7) | 88.6 (31.4) | 93.7 (34.3) | 91.7 (33.2) | 83.8 (28.8) | 70.8 (21.6) | 57.1 (13.9) | 45.9 (7.7) | 69.4 (20.8) |
| Daily mean °F (°C) | 33.0 (0.6) | 36.2 (2.3) | 45.4 (7.4) | 54.3 (12.4) | 64.8 (18.2) | 75.1 (23.9) | 80.1 (26.7) | 78.1 (25.6) | 70.0 (21.1) | 56.8 (13.8) | 43.7 (6.5) | 33.9 (1.1) | 56.0 (13.3) |
| Mean daily minimum °F (°C) | 20.3 (−6.5) | 23.0 (−5.0) | 31.3 (−0.4) | 40.1 (4.5) | 51.2 (10.7) | 61.6 (16.4) | 66.4 (19.1) | 64.7 (18.2) | 56.2 (13.4) | 42.9 (6.1) | 30.2 (−1.0) | 22.0 (−5.6) | 42.5 (5.8) |
| Mean minimum °F (°C) | 2.9 (−16.2) | 5.6 (−14.7) | 12.7 (−10.7) | 24.0 (−4.4) | 35.8 (2.1) | 49.1 (9.5) | 55.8 (13.2) | 54.7 (12.6) | 40.3 (4.6) | 25.7 (−3.5) | 12.8 (−10.7) | 4.2 (−15.4) | −2.9 (−19.4) |
| Record low °F (°C) | −20 (−29) | −26 (−32) | −15 (−26) | 9 (−13) | 19 (−7) | 36 (2) | 46 (8) | 43 (6) | 29 (−2) | 10 (−12) | −13 (−25) | −21 (−29) | −26 (−32) |
| Average precipitation inches (mm) | 0.60 (15) | 0.62 (16) | 1.35 (34) | 1.99 (51) | 2.99 (76) | 3.29 (84) | 3.08 (78) | 2.99 (76) | 1.31 (33) | 2.02 (51) | 0.80 (20) | 0.96 (24) | 22.00 (559) |
| Average snowfall inches (cm) | 3.9 (9.9) | 4.7 (12) | 3.7 (9.4) | 0.8 (2.0) | 0.0 (0.0) | 0.0 (0.0) | 0.0 (0.0) | 0.0 (0.0) | 0.0 (0.0) | 0.6 (1.5) | 1.4 (3.6) | 4.0 (10) | 19.1 (48.4) |
| Average precipitation days (≥ 0.01 in) | 3.6 | 4.4 | 5.6 | 7.1 | 8.6 | 8.5 | 8.3 | 8.5 | 5.2 | 5.9 | 4.3 | 4.2 | 74.2 |
| Average snowy days (≥ 0.1 in) | 3.3 | 2.9 | 1.9 | 0.6 | 0.0 | 0.0 | 0.0 | 0.0 | 0.0 | 0.4 | 1.2 | 2.8 | 13.1 |
Source 1: NOAA
Source 2: National Weather Service

== Demographics ==
Historical population
| Census | Pop. | Note | %± |
|---|---|---|---|
| 1880 | 996 | | — |
| 1890 | 1,763 | | 77.0% |
| 1900 | 1,942 | | 10.2% |
| 1910 | 3,214 | | 65.5% |
| 1920 | 5,061 | | 57.5% |
| 1930 | 10,059 | | 98.8% |
| 1940 | 8,487 | | −15.6% |
| 1950 | 11,262 | | 32.7% |
| 1960 | 13,520 | | 20.0% |
| 1970 | 14,127 | | 4.5% |
| 1980 | 18,001 | | 27.4% |
| 1990 | 21,129 | | 17.4% |
| 2000 | 25,176 | | 19.2% |
| 2010 | 27,340 | | 8.6% |
| 2020 | 27,788 | | 1.6% |
| 2023 (est.) | 27,514 | | −1.0% |
U.S. Decennial Census; 2010-2020

=== 2020 census ===
As of the 2020 census, Dodge City had a population of 27,788 living in 9,000 households and 6,399 families. The population density was 1,888.3 per square mile (729.1/km^{2}). There were 9,869 housing units at an average density of 670.6 per square mile (258.9/km^{2}).

The median age was 30.0 years. 31.7% of residents were under the age of 18 and 9.9% were 65 years of age or older. For every 100 females there were 103.2 males, and for every 100 females age 18 and over there were 101.9 males age 18 and over.

98.3% of residents lived in urban areas, while 1.7% lived in rural areas.

Of the households, 43.8% had children under the age of 18 living in them. Of all households, 48.2% were married-couple households, 19.7% were households with a male householder and no spouse or partner present, and 25.1% were households with a female householder and no spouse or partner present. About 23.3% of all households were made up of individuals and 8.2% had someone living alone who was 65 years of age or older. The average household size was 3.1 and the average family size was 3.7.

Of the housing units, 8.8% were vacant. The homeowner vacancy rate was 1.5% and the rental vacancy rate was 10.7%.

Racial composition as of the 2020 census
| Race | Number | Percent |
|---|---|---|
| Hispanic or Latino (of any race) | 17,759 | 63.9% |
| White | 12,387 | 44.6% |
| Some other race | 7,692 | 27.7% |
| Two or more races | 5,695 | 20.5% |
| Black or African American | 943 | 3.4% |
| American Indian and Alaska Native | 675 | 2.4% |
| Asian | 383 | 1.4% |
| Native Hawaiian and Other Pacific Islander | 13 | 0.0% |

Non-Hispanic whites made up 29.3% of the population.

The percent of those with a bachelor's degree or higher was estimated to be 9.2% of the population.

The 2016–2020 5-year American Community Survey estimates show that the median household income was $52,654 (with a margin of error of +/- $2,947) and the median family income was $61,993 (+/- $5,366). Males had a median income of $35,569 (+/- $3,963) versus $25,217 (+/- $2,969) for females. The median income for those above 16 years old was $31,089 (+/- $1,012). Approximately, 9.7% of families and 13.6% of the population were below the poverty line, including 17.0% of those under the age of 18 and 9.9% of those ages 65 or over.

=== 2010 census ===
As of the 2010 United States census, there were 27,340 people, 8,777 households, and 6,241 families residing in the city. The population density was 1,893.6 inhabitants per square mile (731.1/km^{2}). There were 9,378 housing units at an average density of 649.5 per square mile (250.8/km^{2}). The racial makeup of the city was 72.5% White, 2.5% African American, 1.1% Native American, 1.6% Asian, 0.2% Pacific Islander, 19.3% from other races, and 2.9% from two or more races. Hispanics and Latinos of any race were 57.5% of the population.

There were 8,777 households, of which 40.3% had children under the age of 18 living with them, 51.5% were married couples living together, 13.0% had a female householder with no husband present, 6.6% had a male householder with no wife present, and 28.9% were non-families. 22.7% of all households were made up of individuals, and 8.3% had someone living alone who was 65 years of age or older. The average household size was 3.05, and the average family size was 3.60.

The median age in the city was 28.9 years. 31.8% of residents were under the age of 18; 11.8% were between the ages of 18 and 24; 27.8% were from 25 to 44; 19.6% were from 45 to 64; and 8.9% were 65 years of age or older. The gender makeup of the city was 51.4% male and 48.6% female.

The median income for a household was $43,994, and the median income for a family was $49,957. Males had a median income of $31,400 versus $27,884 for females. The per capita income for the city was $18,350. About 16.7% of families and 19.0% of the population were below the poverty line, including 28.7% of those under age 18 and 8.1% of those age 65 or over.

== Economy ==
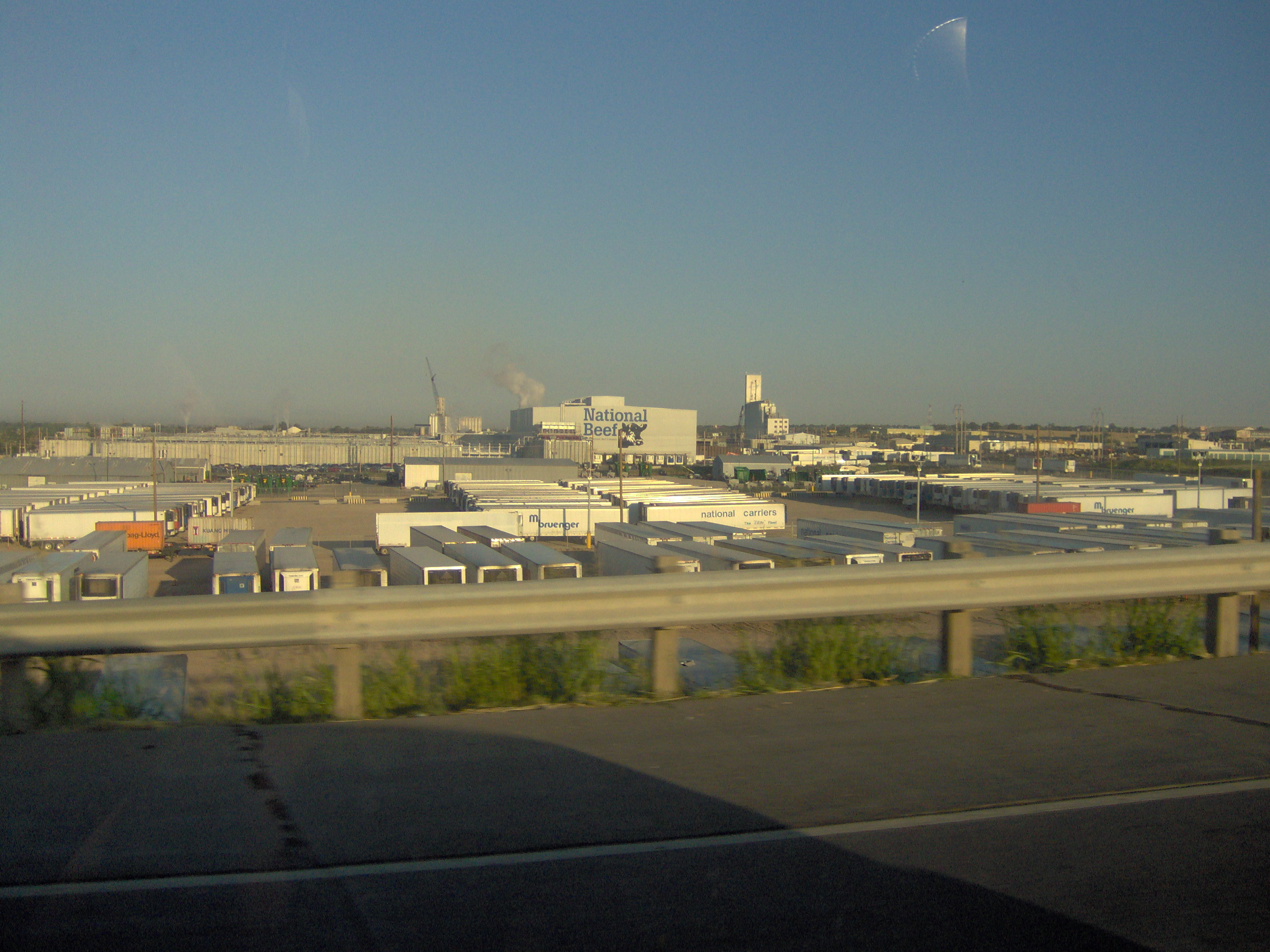
National Beef plant, pictured in 2006. Dodge City is an important center for meat packing.

Meat packing is the primary industry in Dodge City. Cargill Meat Solutions and National Beef both operate large facilities in the city. The city also hosts farm implement manufacturing and serves as a supply center for area agriculture. Livestock-raising is a major activity while wheat and sorghum are the area's main crops. In addition, a local tourism industry, including a casino resort, has developed to capitalize on Dodge City's history as an Old West cowtown. The service sector accounts for much of the rest of the local economy.

As of 2010, 70.9% of the population over the age of 16 was in the labor force. 0.3% was in the armed forces, and 70.5% was in the civilian labor force with 66.9% being employed and 3.6% unemployed. The composition, by occupation, of the employed civilian labor force was: 23.3% in management, business, science, and arts; 16.4% in sales and office occupations; 10.9% in service occupations; 15.2% in natural resources, construction, and maintenance; 34.2% in production, transportation, and material moving. The three industries employing the largest percentages of the working civilian labor force were: manufacturing (33.0%); educational services, health care, and social assistance (18.1%); and retail trade (9.4%).

The cost of living in Dodge City is relatively low; compared to a U.S. average of 100, the cost of living index for the city is 79.3. As of 2010, the median home value in the city was $83,300, the median selected monthly owner cost was $1,013 for housing units with a mortgage and $450 for those without, and the median gross rent was $571.

Ribbon-cutting on the more than $600 million Hilmar Cheese Company manufacturing facility in town was held in March 2025.

=== Top employers ===
Cargill Meat Solutions and National Beef are the two largest employers. Other major employers include local government, schools, retail stores, and health care providers.

Largest employers (100+ Employees)
| Employer | Employees |
|---|---|
| National Beef Packing Company | 2,950 |
| Cargill Meat Solutions | 2,700 |
| Unified School District #443 | 1,292 |
| Wal-Mart Super Center | 400 |
| Western Plains Medical Complex | 295 |
| Boot Hill Casino & Resort | 288 |
| Dodge City Community College | 284 |
| Ford County Government | 263 |
| Hilmar Cheese Company | 250 |
| City of Dodge City | 238 |
| CrustBuster/Speed King, Inc. | 150 |
| Dillon's Super Store | 140 |
| Dodge City Medical Center | 125 |
| Kansas Soldiers' Home | 115 |
| Arrowhead West, Inc. | 101 |

== Government ==
Dodge City has a commission-manager form of government. The city commission consists of five members who serve either two-year or four-year terms, depending on the number of votes they receive. Every year, the commission selects one commissioner to serve as mayor and another to serve as vice-mayor. The commission meets on the first and third Mondays of each month. Appointed by the commission, the city manager leads the city administration, executes the commission's policies, and develops operational programs to meet the city's needs.

As the county seat, Dodge City is the administrative center of Ford County. The county courthouse is located downtown, and all departments of the county government base their operations in the city.

Dodge City lies within Kansas's 1st U.S. Congressional District. For the purposes of representation in the Kansas Legislature, the city is located in the 38th district of the Kansas Senate and the 115th and 119th districts of the Kansas House of Representatives.

Dodge City was criticized by Johnny Dunlap, Ford County Democratic Party's chairman, for only having one polling place for 13,000 voters. For the 2018 election, it was moved outside the city limits one mile from the nearest bus stop. While the county provided transportation, voters had to arrange for it in advance. A lawsuit over the issue was dismissed after Debbie Cox, the county clerk, agreed to open two polling places in the next election.

=== List of mayors ===
- P.L. Beatty, 1875
- James H. Kelley, 1877–1881
- Alonzo B. Webster, 1881–1883
- Lawrence Edward "Larry" Deger, c.1883
- Robert Marr Wright, c.1885–1886
- Adolph B. Gluck, c.1891
- George Merritt Hoover, c.1904, 1911
- Ham B. Bell, c.1906, 1913
- Albert B. Reeves, c.1908
- William T. Hale, c.1915–1916
- W.O. Thompson, c.1928
- E.G. Gingrich, ca. 1935
- C.L. Clinton, c.1952–1954
- Gordon R. Morgan, c.1955–1956
- Frank Mapel, c.1967
- Louis Sanchez, 1984
- Gerald Schmitt, c.1999
- E. Kent Smoll, c.2011–2014
- Joyce Warshaw, c.2015–2020
- Rick Sowers, c.2021
- E. Kent Smoll, c.2022
- Michael O. Burns, c.2023
- Chuck Taylor, c.2024
- Jeffrey Reinert, c.2025

== Education ==
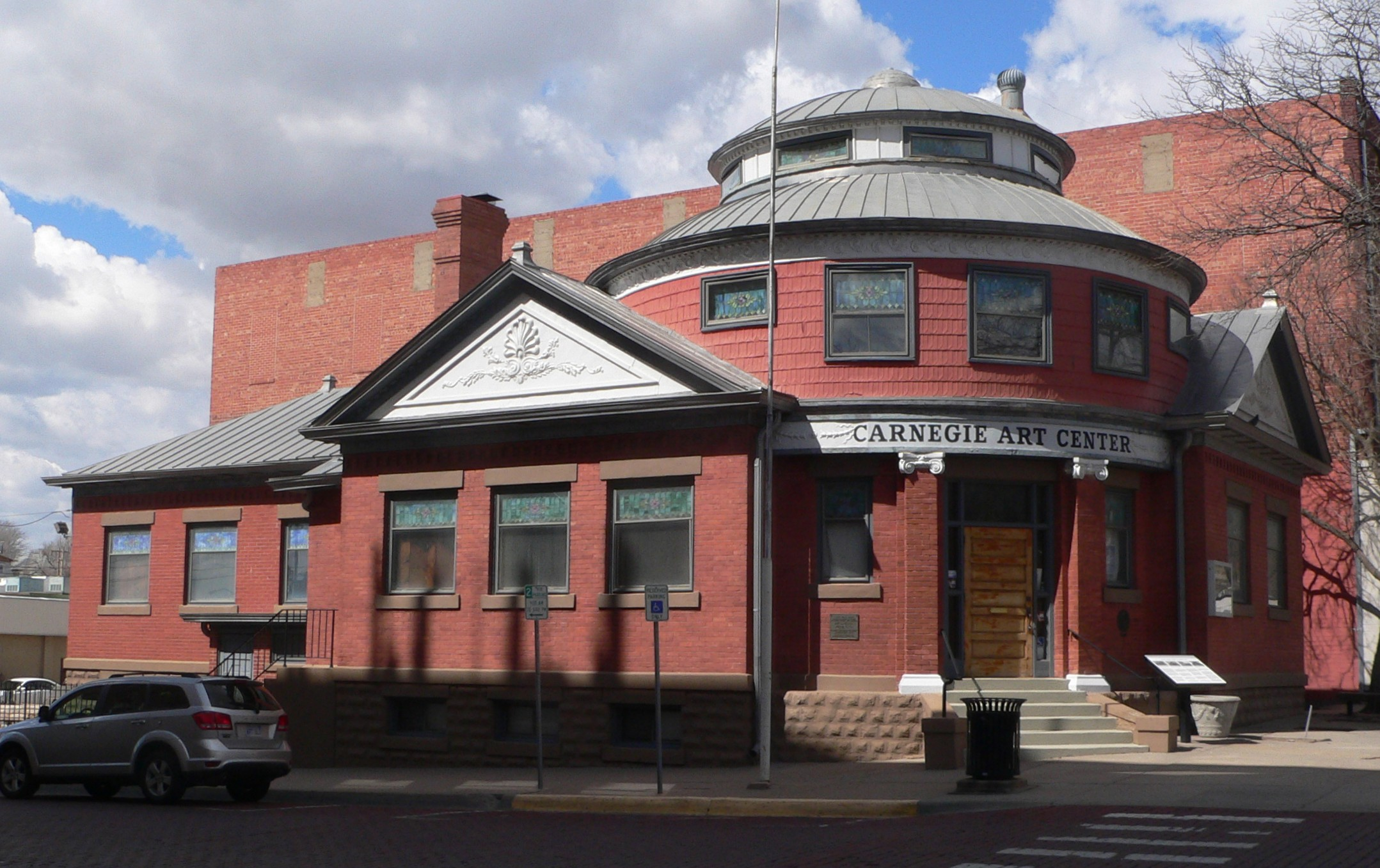
Dodge City Carnegie Art Center (2015)

=== Primary and secondary education ===
Dodge City USD 443 public school district serves over 6,000 students and operates 14 schools in the city, including one early childhood center, eight elementary schools, two middle schools, one high school, and one alternative school.

The Roman Catholic Diocese of Dodge City oversees one Catholic school in the city: Sacred Heart Cathedral School (Pre-K-8).

=== Colleges and universities ===
Dodge City Community College (DCCC), a two-year public college with approximately 2,000 students, is located in the northwestern part of the city. From 1952 to 1993, Dodge City was also home to St. Mary of the Plains College, a private, four-year Catholic liberal arts college. Newman University, a Catholic university based in Wichita, now operates a branch campus on St. Mary of the Plains' former grounds.

=== Libraries ===
Dodge City Public Library, located north of downtown, is the city's main library. A member of the Southwest Kansas Library System, it has a collection of approximately 123,000 volumes, and it circulates more than 189,000 items annually. It was founded as a Carnegie library in 1905 and moved to its current facility in 1981. The library offers several services to the public, including computer classes, public internet access, and programs for children and adults. Another library in the city is the DCCC Library, which holds more than 30,000 volumes and serves as a federal depository library.

== Infrastructure ==
=== Transportation ===
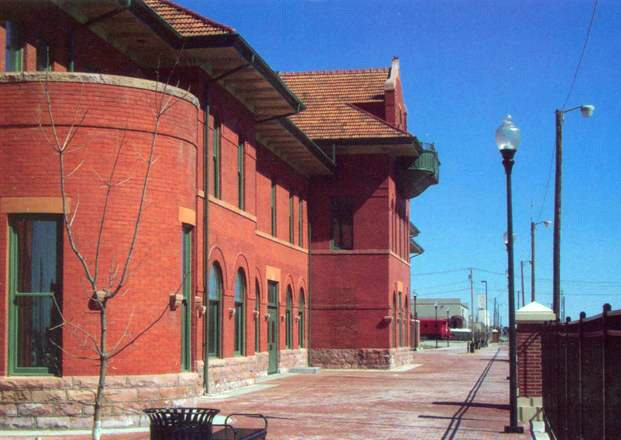
Dodge City Amtrak station (2008)

Originally a stop on the Santa Fe Trail, Dodge City was later located on the National Old Trails Road, also known as the Ocean-to-Ocean Highway, which followed the trail's path in western Kansas upon its establishment in 1912. Currently, four U.S. Highways meet in Dodge City: U.S. Route 50, U.S. Route 56, U.S. Route 283, and U.S. Route 400. U.S. 50, an east–west route, runs through the northern part of the city. U.S. 400, which also runs east–west, runs through the southern part of the city. U.S. 56, an east–west route, and U.S. 283, a north–south route, run concurrently around the city's southern and eastern fringe. The U.S. 50 business route runs concurrently with U.S. 56, U.S. 283, and U.S. 400 at different points through the southern part and around the eastern part of the city.

Dodge City Regional Airport is located approximately 2 miles (3.2 km) east of the city. Used primarily for general aviation, it hosts one commercial airline with daily flights to Denver, CO.

Three railroads serve Dodge City: the La Junta Subdivision of the BNSF Railway, which runs east–west; the main line of the Cimarron Valley Railroad of which Dodge City is the northeastern terminus; and the Boot Hill and Western Railway of which the city is the northwestern terminus. Using the BNSF trackage, Amtrak provides passenger rail service on its Southwest Chief line between Chicago and Los Angeles. Amtrak's Dodge City station is located downtown.

Fixed-route bus service provided by D-TRAN operates between 6am and 7pm Monday-Friday.

=== Utilities ===
The Utilities Division of the city government's Public Works Department operates and maintains the city's water and waste water distribution systems. The department's Sanitation Division provides trash pickup. Operations Management International, Inc. (OMI), a private contractor, provides waste water treatment, pumping the city's waste water to treatment holding ponds 12 miles south of the city. The Victory Electric Cooperative Association, Inc., part of the Mid-Kansas Electric Company, delivers electricity to the city. Local residents primarily use natural gas as their heating fuel; natural gas service is provided by Black Hills Energy.

=== Health care ===
The Western Plains Medical Complex is the sole hospital in Dodge City. A 100-bed hospital accredited by the Joint Commission, it serves as a referral center for southwestern Kansas.

== Media ==
The Dodge City Daily Globe is the city's daily newspaper with a circulation of approximately 7,000 copies. In addition, the Roman Catholic Diocese of Dodge City publishes a weekly newspaper, The Southwest Kansas Catholic, formerly known as The Southwest Kansas Register. The High Plains Journal, a weekly trade journal covering regional agricultural news, is also published in the city.

Along with Garden City, Dodge City is a center of broadcast media for southwestern Kansas. Two AM radio stations, seven FM radio stations, and four television stations are licensed to and/or broadcast from the area. Dodge City is located in the Wichita-Hutchinson, Kansas television market. The four stations that broadcast from the city include: CBS-affiliated KBSD and FOX-affiliated KSAS-LP, both of which are satellite stations of their respective affiliates in Wichita; a satellite station of Smoky Hills Public Television, the Public Broadcasting Service member network covering western Kansas; and KDDC-LD a sister station of KDGL-LD in Sublette, Kansas.

== Parks and recreation ==
The city's Parks and Recreation Department maintains 21 parks in the city. The largest is Wright Park, located immediately south of downtown and home to the Dodge City Zoo. Legends Park, in the northern part of the city, is a four-diamond, tournament-level baseball and softball complex that hosts both youth and adult league games. The city also maintains the St. Mary Soccer Complex, which includes six full-size game pads and three junior-sized fields, and the municipal pool.

There are two golf courses in the city, one public and one private. Mariah Hills Municipal Golf Course, the public course, is an 18-hole course built in 1974 and redesigned in 1990. It includes a full-service pro shop, driving range, and putting green. Dodge City Country Club, the private course, is an 18-hole course built in 1916 and expanded in 1982.

== Culture ==
=== Arts and music ===
Two galleries support an arts community in the city. Located in the original public library building, The Carnegie Center for the Arts provides gallery space to local artists and houses the Dodge City Arts Council. The second gallery, the Second Avenue Art Guild, exhibits the work of regional artists in ceramics, photography, and other media.

The Depot Theater Company, based in the former Santa Fe Railroad Depot, puts on theatrical productions throughout the year. Founded in 1984, the group performs in both the old depot and the Occident Theater.

=== Events ===
Each summer, the Dodge City Chamber of Commerce holds Dodge City Days, the city's annual community festival. Lasting ten days, it includes the Dodge City Roundup Rodeo, a parade, a beauty pageant, music concerts, a golf tournament, arts and craft shows, and other activities. Several other community events are held throughout the year. In early May, the city's sizable Mexican community celebrates Cinco de Mayo in Wright Park with live music, folk dance performances, and traditional Mexican cuisine. To celebrate Independence Day, the city holds its Old-Fashioned Fourth of July, which includes a fireworks display and children's activities at Boot Hill. Christmas in Old Dodge City, the city's winter holiday festival, starts in late November and lasts until Christmas. It begins with a formal Christmas tree lighting downtown, a chili cook-off, and the Parade of Lights, a parade of floats decorated with Christmas lights.

Two other annual events reflect the central role of agriculture in the local economy. The Ford County Fair is held in July and includes 4-H and FFA exhibits, competitions, and shows, as well as other activities. Also in July, the Western Kansas Manufacturers Association (WKMA) holds the 3i Show, an agri-business expo of agricultural products, technology, and services.

=== Points of interest ===
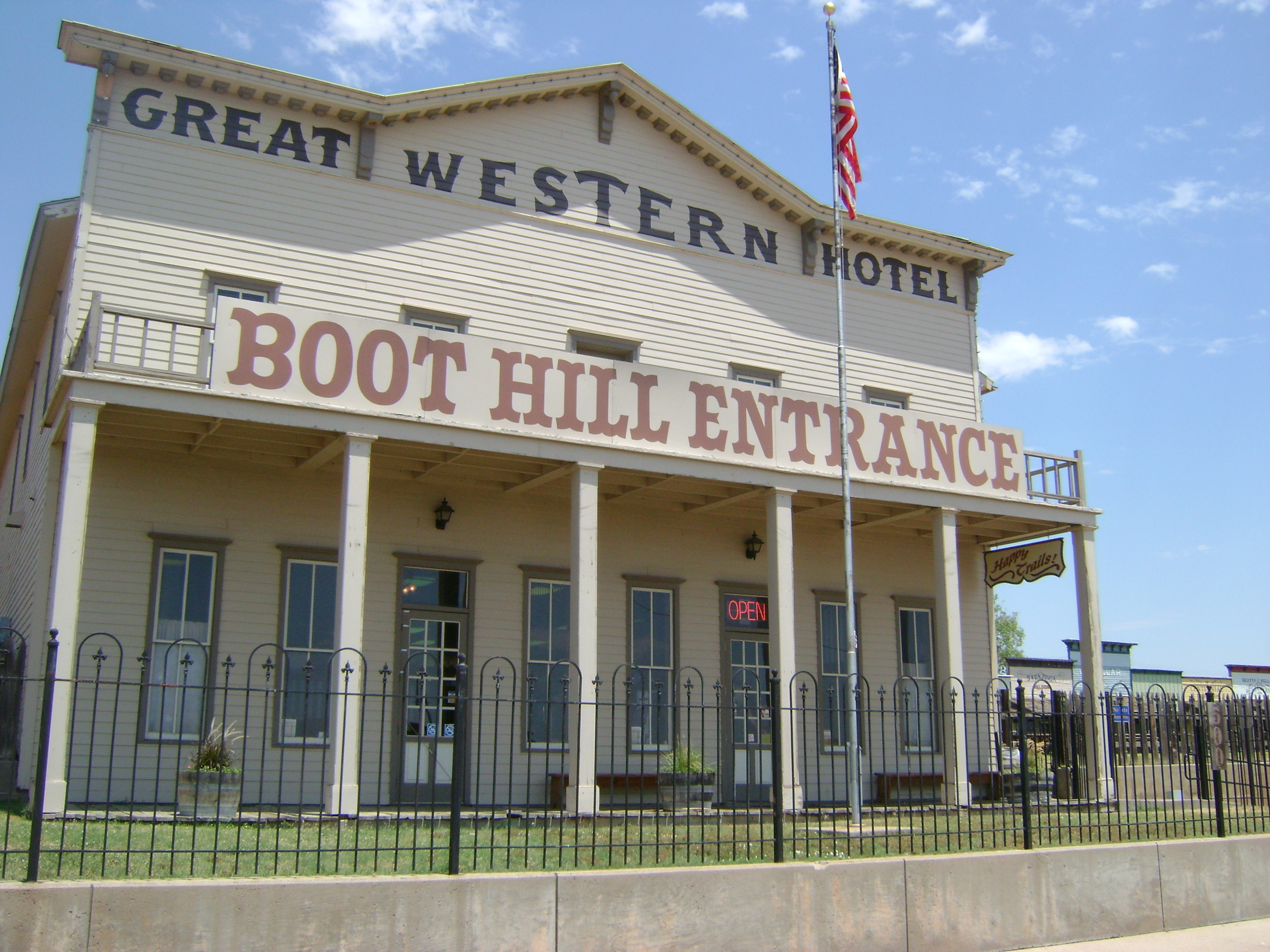
The Boot Hill Museum (2010)

Located in and around the city are a number of historical sites, museums, and landmarks dedicated to Dodge City's Old West heritage. The Boot Hill Museum, located downtown, contains thousands of artifacts and a variety of exhibits portraying the culture of the city's early years. The museum's larger exhibits include: Front Street, a partial reconstruction of downtown Dodge City as it existed in 1876; the Long Branch Saloon and the Long Branch Variety Show; the Saratoga Saloon; the Hardesty House, a period-typical home built in 1879; the city's original Boot Hill Cemetery; the Mexican Village, a number of artifacts from the Santa Fe railroad workers settlement; and the Kansas Cowboy Hall of Fame. The Santa Fe Trail Remains, located 9 miles (14 km) west of the city, are preserved wagon tracks from a section of the Santa Fe Trail. The Ford County Historical Society maintains the Mueller-Schmidt House, called the "Home of Stone." Built from area limestone in 1881, it is the oldest building in the city still standing at its original site. Other historical landmarks include: El Capitan, a life-sized bronze sculpture of a Texas Longhorn steer built to commemorate the cattle drives that once ended in the city; a bronze statue of famous Dodge City lawman Wyatt Earp; and the Santa Fe Depot, the largest extant train depot in Kansas.

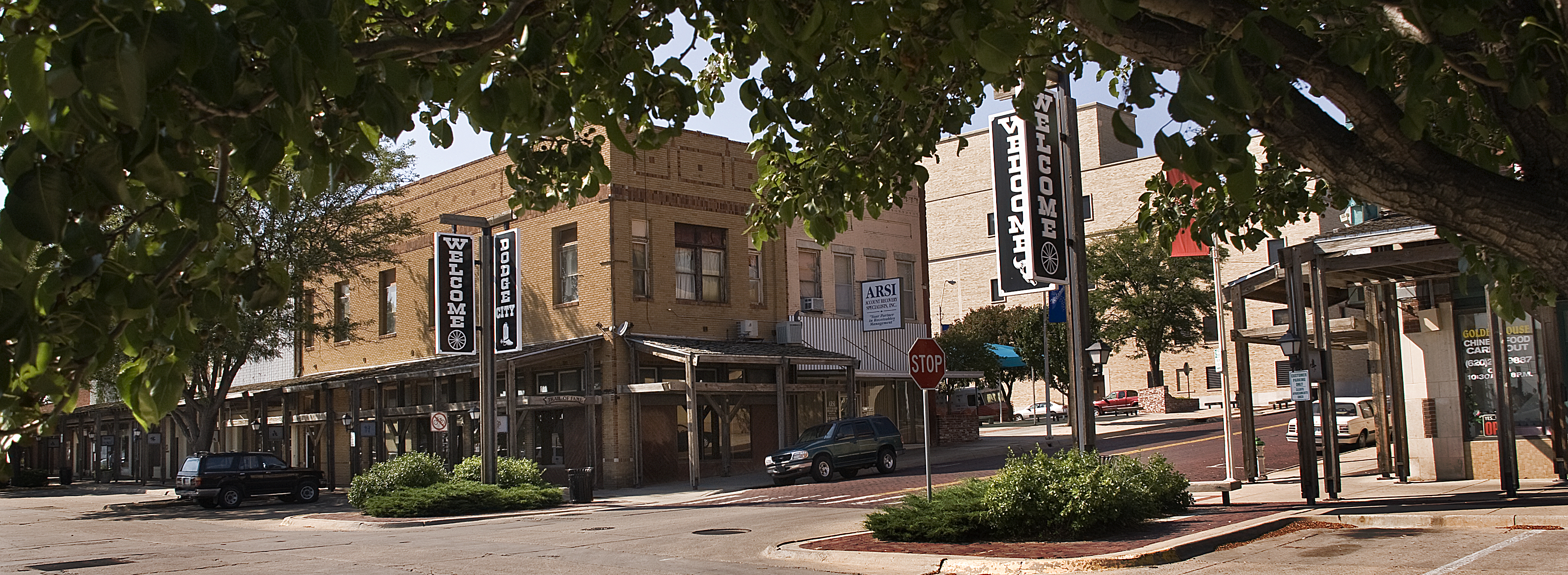
Dodge City maintains part of its downtown as a tourist attraction. (2008)

To capitalize on this heritage, the city promotes its downtown business district as historic Old Dodge City complete with Western-themed tourist attractions, shops, and restaurants. Visitors can tour the district by trolley or by taking the Dodge City Trail of Fame walking tour. The state of Kansas operates the similarly themed Boot Hill Casino & Resort on the west side of the city – when it opened for business in December 2009, Boot Hill became the first state-owned casino in the United States.

Dodge City Civic Center and United Wireless Arena are the city's two main indoor event venues. The Civic Center, built in 1954, is a 2,800-seat multipurpose facility that has hosted a variety of events, including concerts and sporting events. United Wireless Arena, opened in 2011, is a 5,500-seat multipurpose arena located next to the Boot Hill Casino on the west side of the city. Owned by the City of Dodge City and Ford County, the arena complex includes the 10,000-square-foot (930 m^{2}) Magouirk Conference Center.

Other sites of interest in the city include the Dodge City Zoo and the Kansas Teachers' Hall of Fame. The Zoo is located in Wright Park and is home to more than 45 animals. Located downtown, the Kansas Teachers' Hall of Fame hosts exhibits on education in Kansas and claims to be the first of its kind in the United States.

=== Religion ===
There are 33 Christian churches in and around Dodge City. The Roman Catholic Diocese of Dodge City is based in the city. Established in 1951, it comprises 28 Kansas counties, roughly the southwestern quarter of the state. The city is home to the diocese's current cathedral as well as its former cathedral, the Cathedral of Our Lady of Guadalupe and Sacred Heart Cathedral, respectively. Also headquartered in the city is the Dodge City District of the United Methodist Church, which consists of 22 counties in southwestern Kansas.

=== Sports ===
Dodge City Community College's athletic teams, the Dodge City Conquistadors (or "Conqs" for short), compete in several sports in the Kansas Jayhawk Community College Conference (KJCCC).

Beyond DCCC sports, Dodge City also hosts amateur baseball and professional motorsports. The Dodge City Athletics, nicknamed the "A's", are a collegiate summer baseball team in the Jayhawk Collegiate League of the National Baseball Congress. Both the A's and the DCCC Conquistadors baseball team use Cavalier Field, located on the former St. Mary of the Plains College campus, as their home field. Dodge City Raceway Park, located immediately south of the city, is a 3/8-mile dirt track that hosts midget and sprint car racing from April through October. Past events at the park have included National Sprint Tour and World of Outlaws races. The Western Kansas Dirt Riders, a motocross team, race at Tumbleweed Raceway adjacent to the Raceway Park.

In the past, Dodge City hosted college football and professional basketball as well. From 1970 to 1980, the annual Boot Hill Bowl post-season college football game was played in Dodge City. The bowl was sanctioned by the National Association of Intercollegiate Athletics and featured schools such as Washburn University and Emporia State University. The last game was played on November 21, 1980. From 2000 to 2007, the city was home to a minor league professional basketball team, the Dodge City Legend of the United States Basketball League.

=== In popular culture ===
Starting in the 1870s, the violent episodes of early Dodge City history, particularly the exploits of Wyatt Earp, attracted national media attention. National news coverage of the 1883 Dodge City War civil strife fueled public perceptions of frontier turmoil and established Dodge City as the "Sodom of the West" in the public consciousness. Gunfighters and lawmen such as Earp and his brothers and partners became celebrities, and sensationalized versions of their activities entered period popular culture as the subject of dime novels. Over time, the level and scale of the violence in early Dodge City were significantly embellished, becoming the stuff of legend. This trend continued into the 20th century, particularly after the 1931 publication of Stuart N. Lake's book Wyatt Earp: Frontier Marshal. Regarded in American folklore as the quintessential rough and rowdy Old West frontier town, Dodge City served as the setting for numerous works of Western-themed media, including later popular films and television series.

Dodge City was the setting of the long-running radio and television series Gunsmoke. The series followed the adventures of fictional U.S. Marshal Matt Dillon portrayed on radio by William Conrad and then on television by James Arness, as he dealt with gunfighters, cattle rustlers, gamblers and other criminals while enforcing the law in the frontier town. The radio lasted from 1952 to 1961 while the television series ran from 1955 to 1975, on the CBS television network, and was one of the longest-running prime-time TV dramas in American history. The show proved to be culturally influential and promoted the legend of Dodge City's Old West era. It also served as the source of the idiom "get [the hell] out of Dodge", which means to leave a dangerous area quickly. In honor of the series, the city government changed the name of Walnut Street, one of its downtown streets, to Gunsmoke Street, in 1959.

The city has also been a setting for a number of films and television series dramatizing the career of Wyatt Earp. These include several seasons of the series The Life and Legend of Wyatt Earp starring Hugh O'Brian from 1955 to 1961, and the films Winchester '73 (1950), with James Stewart; Masterson of Kansas (1954), with George Montgomery; Cheyenne Autumn (1964), featuring Stewart, Richard Widmark, and Edward G. Robinson; and Wyatt Earp (1994) with Kevin Costner and Gene Hackman. In the 1939 film Dodge City, the fictional lawman Wade Hatton, played by Errol Flynn, was modeled on Earp.

The area officially called West Brewarrina, part of Brewarrina, New South Wales, Australia, was dubbed "Dodge City" by its Aboriginal residents, after they had been moved there in 1965 from the Aboriginal reserve known as Brewarrina Aboriginal Mission. The name reflects the racial segregation practised in the town.

In the television series Smallville, Metropolis is said to be southwest of Dodge City with Smallville, "Superman" / Clark Kent's childhood and adolescent residence, located 200 miles (320 km) west of Wichita.

More recently, Dodge City served as a setting for the 2005 multi-platform video game Gun.

The Bruce Springsteen song "If I Was the Priest", from his 2020 album Letter to You, has a lyric where one character tells another "We need you, son, tonight up in Dodge City".

In 2022, Country Singer Charley Crockett released his song "Black Sedan" from his 2022 album The Man From Waco, which includes the line "Hello, Dodge City, tell me how do you do?".

Dodge City is prominently featured in Ken Burns PBS documentary The American Buffalo, which premiered on October 16, 2023.

== Notable people ==
Numerous figures of the American Old West lived in Dodge City during its period as a frontier cowtown. These included, most notably, lawmen Wyatt Earp and Bat Masterson as well as gunfighter Doc Holliday. Other notable natives and residents have included Vaudeville actor and comedian Eddie Foy Sr., wrestler Sputnik Monroe, and actor Dennis Hopper.

== Gallery ==
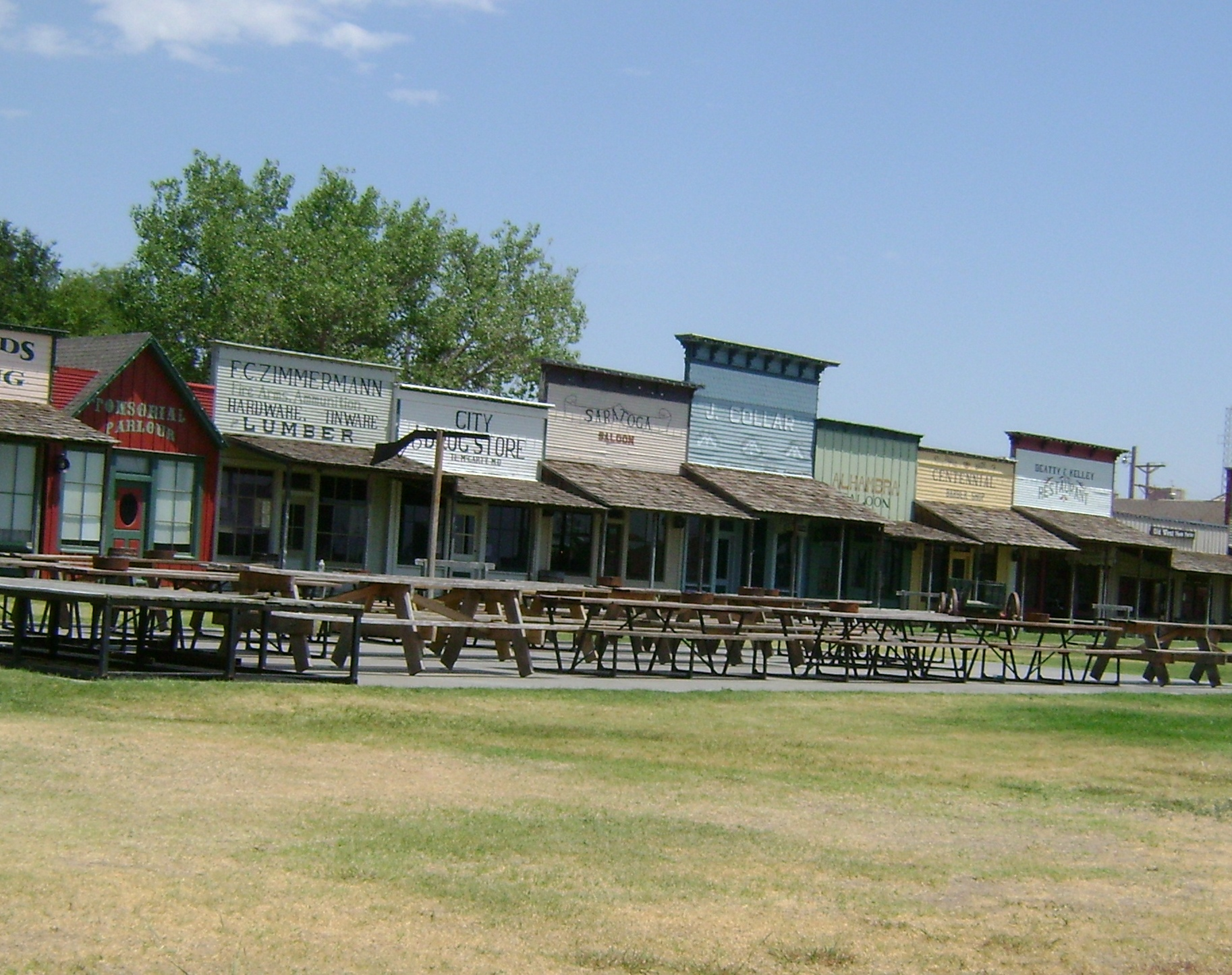
Reconstructed shops on Front Street at the Boot Hill Museum (2010)

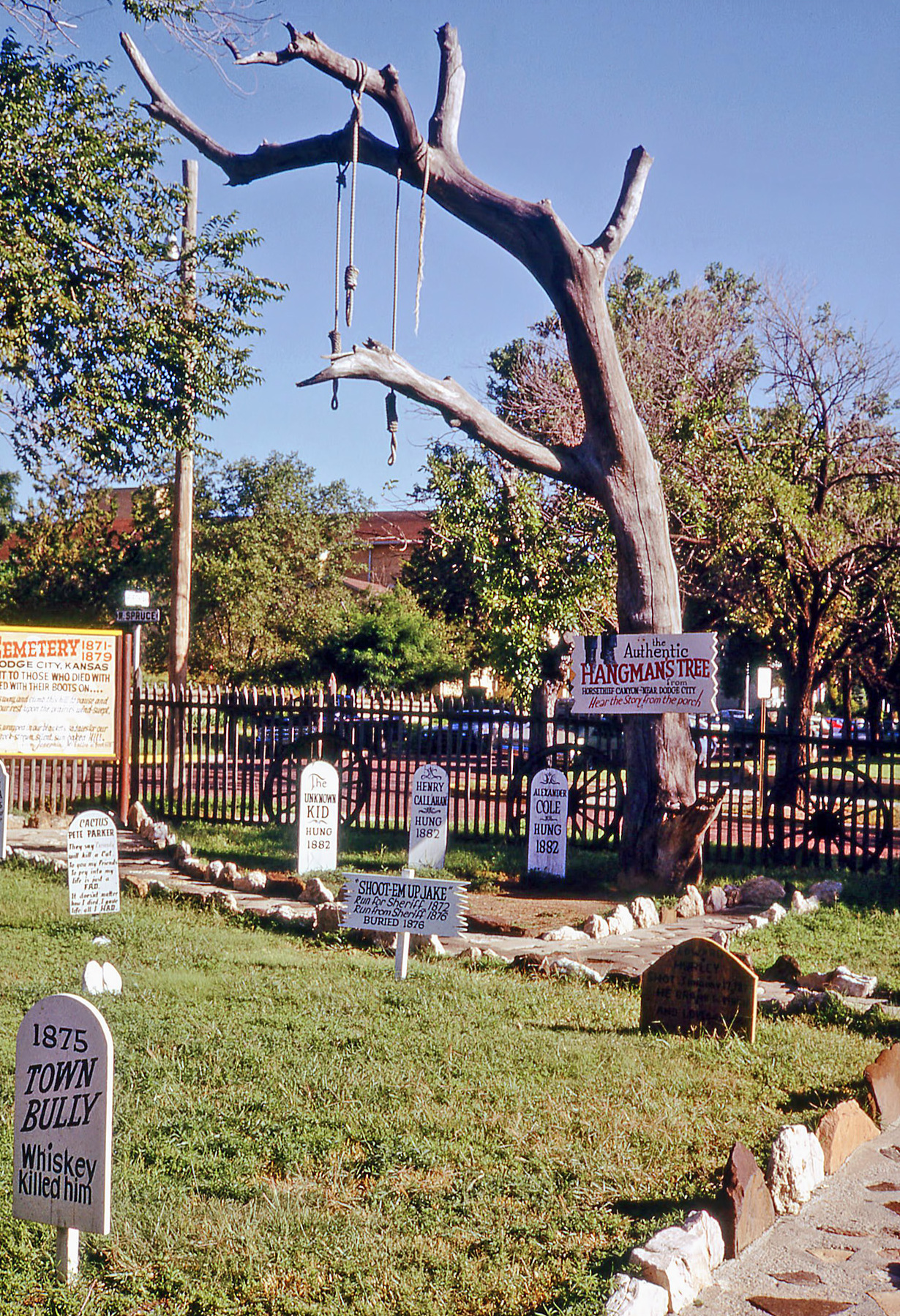
Hanging Tree at the Boot Hill Cemetery (1972)

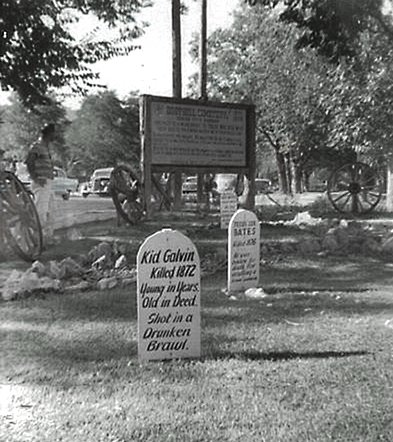
Graves at Museum (1959)

== See also ==
- Gunsmoke very popular radio and TV program, 1955–1975, giving fictional view of Wild West in Dodge City in 1870s
- Jones Plummer Trail
- Mexican Village, Dodge City, Kansas
- Murder trial of seven Cheyenne (1879)
- National Old Trails Road
- Santa Fe Trail
