= Mexican Village, Dodge City, Kansas =

Mexican Village La Yarda
- Village
- Nickname: Little Mexico
- Interactive map of Mexican Village
- Location within the state of Kansas
- Coordinates (Mexican Village): 37.75°N 100.01°W
- Country: United States
- State: Kansas
- County: Ford
- City: Dodge City
- First settled: 1906
- Condemned: 1955
- Founder: Atchison, Topeka and Santa Fe Railway

Population
  - Estimate (1939): 300

The Mexican Village, also known originally by residents as La Yarda, was a settlement within Dodge City, Kansas. The village came about with the creation of the Santa Fe Railroad in the early 20th century. It was an assemblage of shacks east of the Santa Fe roundhouse. It was condemned and demolished in 1955.

The Village is featured in the Boot Hill Museum in Dodge City as a permanent exhibit.

== History ==
=== 1906-1911: Establishment ===
The Atchison, Topeka & Santa Fe Railway was charted in February 1859 to serve the cities of Atchison and Topeka, Kansas, and Santa Fe, New Mexico. The primary back shops at Topeka, Kansas, were first established in the 1860s. In September 1872, the tracks had reached Dodge City and the area began to grow.

The wages were higher than those in Mexico and required little education, leading to a heavily Mexican workforce for the railroad. These worker would stay on the railroads for six to nine months a year, before returning to Mexico for the winter.

This did not provide the railroad with a stable work force. As a result, in 1906 Santa Fe President E.P. Ripley implemented new management to increase the efficiency and loyalty of Mexican workers. A policy was initiated to encourage Mexican workers to bring their families to live with them on company property in attempt to recreate traditional family values. The company expected that family reunification would enforce traditional values and increase the idea that the men needed to provide for their families. The policy was a success and multiple boxcar settlements appeared in locations along the Kansas railways.

While it is possible that workers had brought their families along before the policy took shape, it was not until the 1906 baptism records from the local church, Sacred Heart Parish, that they were documented. The number is unknown, however from 1907 to 1915, over 80 new Spanish surnames appeared in the records.

The village originally consisted of shack homes that were located just east of the Santa Fe Depot. Most of the structures were made of railroad ties and discarded railroad car sidings. Some were sod homes, while others were framed and finished with adobe and straw. It is estimated there were ten homes on this site. When those were full, the remaining families lived in tents or built shacks along the railway. There were only two entrances and exits to the community - to the south, Fort Dodge Road and to the north, "el puente". El puente, as dubbed by residents, were two six foot high tunnels under a railroad track that served as a drainage ditch. While the tunnel kept them safe from going over the tracks, the system would fill with water. It also served as makeshift playground for kids in the summer to escape the heat.

While it was not an enforced segregated village, as all workers of the railroad could live there, segregation was still enforced in town. Mexicans were not allowed in barber shops, restaurants, and other public spaces outside the village. While in theaters, they were only allowed to sit the back few rows.

=== 1912-1938: Expansion and schooling ===
In 1912, Santa Fe began constructing a spur line to Elkhart, Kansas, additional laborers were recruited from Mexico. In response, the railroad constructed three rows of houses from old lumber in new location along the railway, east of the roundhouse. The families from the first location were then consolidated back into one location. The number of workers grew to nearly 100 by 1915. As a result, Santa Fe rearranged the housing and divided the men into three groups - freight, track. and shop. Housing continued to be built along the west side of the tracks. The homes were bare, some with wooden floors, however most were dirt and had tar paper on the roofs to protect from the elements. Others built homes in old freight cars. There was no indoor plumbing or sewage systems, with families sharing outhouses. Water was provided by two hydrants and was carried back to homes for drinking and cleaning water. Electricity was not available in the community, with the only lamp being outside the grocery store. The community would use bonfires made from railroad ties as light during the nighttime. The Dodge City Daily Globe claimed that around 150 people were living in the villages by 1913.

In 1915, a building was constructed by Reverend John Handly of the Catholic Church. The building served as a church and a day and night school. The school would teach girls sewing, cooking, and other domestic chores in the morning and teach boys typewriting, telegraphy, and stenography at nighttime from grades first through fourth. Handly stated that he built the building because he believed the people were being neglected and that having an education would foster a better community. The school opened that September with 49 students. By 1920, the numbers grew, fostering a need for a larger school. A two-room district Coronado School was built and it could now teach up to fifth and sixth grade. The school was also used for adult night classes. The school operated until the 1948-49 school year before being sold to the Mayrath Machinery Company and converted into an office building.

=== 1939-1955: Life and condemnation ===
In 1939, the population was reported have reached 300 people. The families would pay $7 per month of rent to live in the rowhouses. Those who owned their homes would pay the railroad 50 cents a month to lease the lot their homes sat on. At this point there were 56 residential structures, a church, a school, a dance hall, and a playground. Plumbing was still not available in the village with outhouses still in use.

In 1940, the railroad replaced coal-fired steam engines with diesel engines as a result of World War II. As a result, they needed a place to store diesel fuel and built a sizable tank in the midst of the village. Those residents were forced to move elsewhere in the village or go north of the tracks.

The community continued to outgrow the area and a new church building was needed. The village used their annual fiestas from 1943 through 1949 to serve as fundraisers for the building. A fiesta queen was crowned at each fiesta, with nominees collecting dollars as votes. Outside businesses paid for advertisement in printed programs. Mexican food was cooked and sold at booths. Funds were raised and Our Lady Guadalupe Church celebrated their first mass on Easter Sunday in 1950. This church remained in use until 2001 when it merged with The Sacred Heart, after a new Our Lady of Guadalupe Cathedral was erected.

On August 15, 1955, representatives of the Santa Fe Railroad, city officials, members of the Chamber of Commerce, the pastor of the Mexican Catholic Church and City, and a county health officer met to discuss the future of the village. The board made the decision to close the village, announcing it in the next day's paper. D.B. Kurtz, Santa Fe's divisional superintendent, cited its closure to low standard living conditions and health concerns. The village never had plumbing, electricity, or proper waste disposal implemented during its almost fifty years.

"This was a fire hazard, a health hazard, and there were rats. It was terrible down there. In the winter they had these kerosene stoves. You couldn't breathe. Severo ["Tony"] Sumaya was kind of the mayor of the Village area. I asked Tony about it. Tony said it would probably be the best thing for all of us." Dr. Richard Ohman, City and County Health Officer. July 2, 1982

Those in company houses were given a month to vacate, as the homes would be torn down immediately. Owners of private houses on the railroad lands were given a year to find new housing. After the residents relocated, the Chamber of Commerce, municipal authorities, and the Santa Fe Railroad cleared out the village. The land was sold to the Mayrath Machinery Company.

At the time of its condemnation, sixteen families - not all of the same homes - were residents of the village. The families, according to the 1955 Polk Directory, were Amaro, Carmona, Ceballos, Dorantes, Espinosa, Esquibel, Garnica, Gonzales, Mariche, Martinez, Moreno, Rodriquez, Sumaya, and Torrez. Many residents had already moved out of the village before its condemnation. Most families moved north of the tracks, living near each other on Avenues E through L from the 500 block to the 1200 block, as a result of segregation from white neighborhoods.

== Culture ==
=== Catholicism ===
In 1913, Father Rafael Serrano, a Claretian priest, immigrated from Mexico allowing many Mexicans to hear gospel in their language for the first time.

In 1915, the village opened a Catholic church and celebrated their first mass on the Feast of the Ascension. The building was 52 feet long and 24 feet wide. It served as both a school and a church for the village.

=== Arts ===
Festivals and music were a large part of the village. The Santa Fe Mexican Band was formed in 1922 under band director, Alberto Anzaldua, being the only Mexican band in the state at the time. The band consisted of railroad employees and would appear in parades, fairground performances, and other special occasions. They were one of seven bands to march in the Pageant of Progress parade during the Great Southwest Fair in Dodge City. Daughters of a Santa Fe employee, Delores and Josephine Torrez, would sing on KGNO radio with fellow singer, Freddy Martinez. The trio would also perform at local festivals, weddings, and more.

Traditional Mexican holidays were celebrated in the village with music, food, and dancing. Cinco de Mayo and Mexican Independence Day were two of the largest celebrations in the community. The village would decorated the entrances with United States and Mexican flags. A stage would be built for performances and dancing, with the words "Viva Mexico" inscribed into it.

=== Mexican revolution tensions ===
From 1910 to 1920, the Mexican Revolution took place, with José Victoriano Huerta Márquez becoming the dictator of Mexico through a coup d'etat. It saw the destruction of the Federal Army, its replacement by a revolutionary army, and the transformation of Mexican culture and government.

The laborers and families, still connected to their country, developed factions throughout the community based on loyalties. This caused tensions to grow within the community and occasionally this would turn violent. In 1912, two men were shot and stabbed in an argument. The following year it was reported that recently laid off laborers purchased over a dozen revolvers. Shots were often heard in the village at night time. In 1914, a large brawl was reported after arguments broke out about Huerta and Mexican revolutionary Pancho Villa. It was reported one man was hit in the head with a stone, while two others were shot.

Ben Hodges, an authority figure and Mexican immigrant, acted as a peace keeper during this time. He was called upon during times of disturbance in the village. Hodges was not an resident of the community, nor an employee of the railroad, however he was one the few people outside the village that could speak spanish. While not official, the Dodge City Daily Globe would refer to him as the mayor of village, as he would act as an interpreter and would assist in court, marriage licenses, doctor visits, and would help arrange funerals. He was also a vocal advocate for building a school for the local children.

== Legacy ==
Our Lady of Guadalupe Church remains a staple in the community, hosting celebration events for the remaining former citizens and their descendants.

In 2007, a historical marker at 207 E. Wyatt Earp Blvd., recognizing the village, was dedicated. The celebration reunited former residents and featured a performance by former residents, Delores, Josephine, Carole, and Manuela Torrez. Speakers included former mayor, Louis Sanchez.

In 2014, a reunion was hosted with more than 200 people in attendance. The celebration included familial pictures and performances by residents and others. The reunion was archived onto a site as part of the Mexican Village Historic Preservation Project that was established by the Southwest Kansas Catholic newspaper.

The annual Dodge City International Festival was inaugurated on September 15, 2019. The first festival exhibit included historic photographs and portraits of their descendants.

=== Notable persons ===
- Louis "Louie' Sanchez - Mayor of Dodge City 1984
- Sgt. Victor Amaro - First Hispanic person to serve on the Dodge City police force
- Baltasar S. "Freddie" Esquibel - Founder of the Freddie Esquibel Orchestra
- Tim Sandoval - Pitcher for the Texaco Oilers

=== In media ===
- 'Las Madrea' by Dennis Garcia.
  - A book exploring the life of Rafaela, a born resident of the village.
  - The book was awarded the Kansas Notable Book Award.
- 'Dodge City's Mexican Village: A Place in Time' by Tim Weiz.
  - A book that explores the history and the lives of residents of the village. Weiz interviews a number of surviving residents and explores their familial history.
