= Boot Hill Museum =

Museum in Dodge City, Kansas

Coordinates: 37.7536°N 100.0223°W

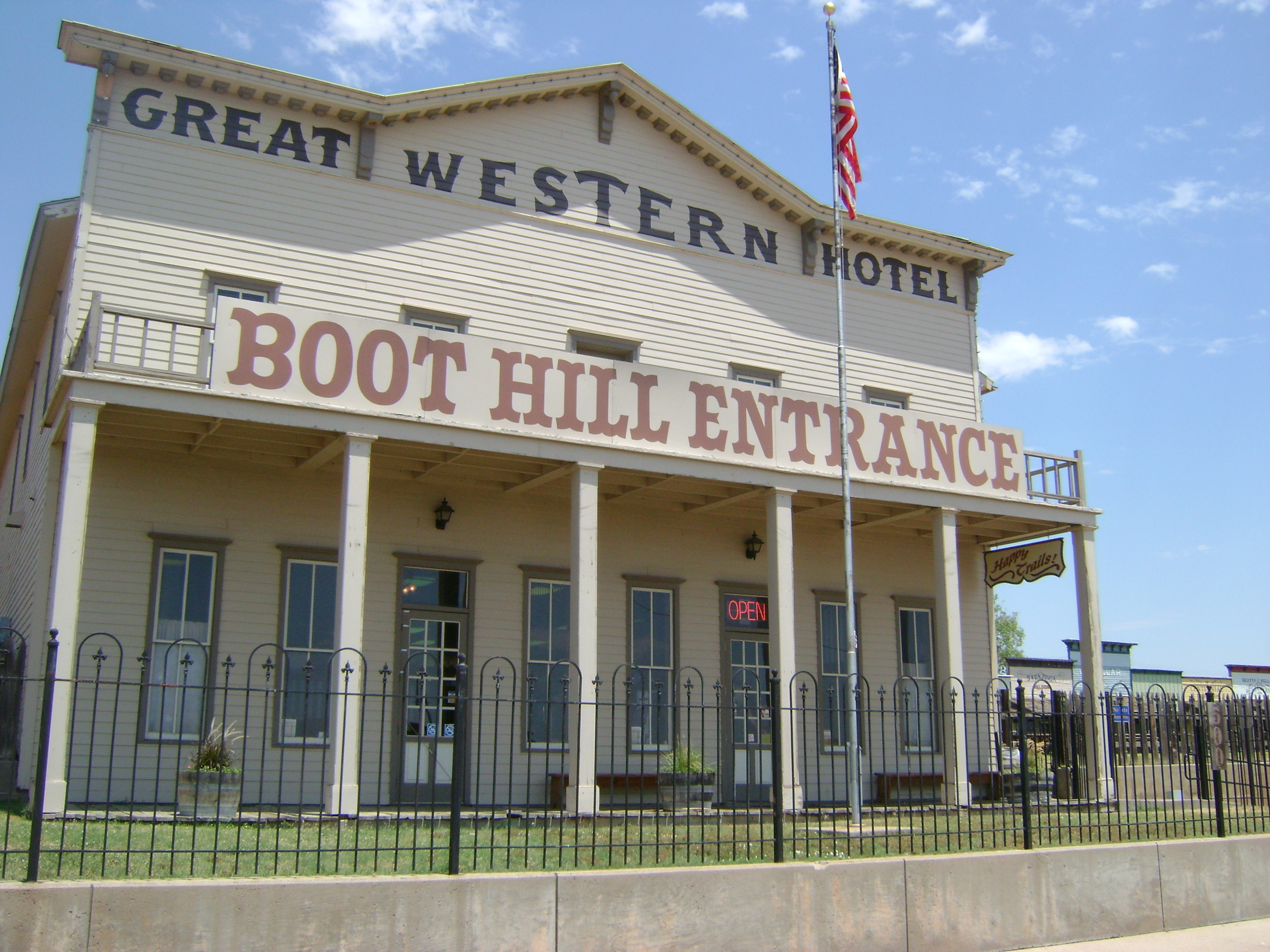
Entrance to Boot Hill Museum

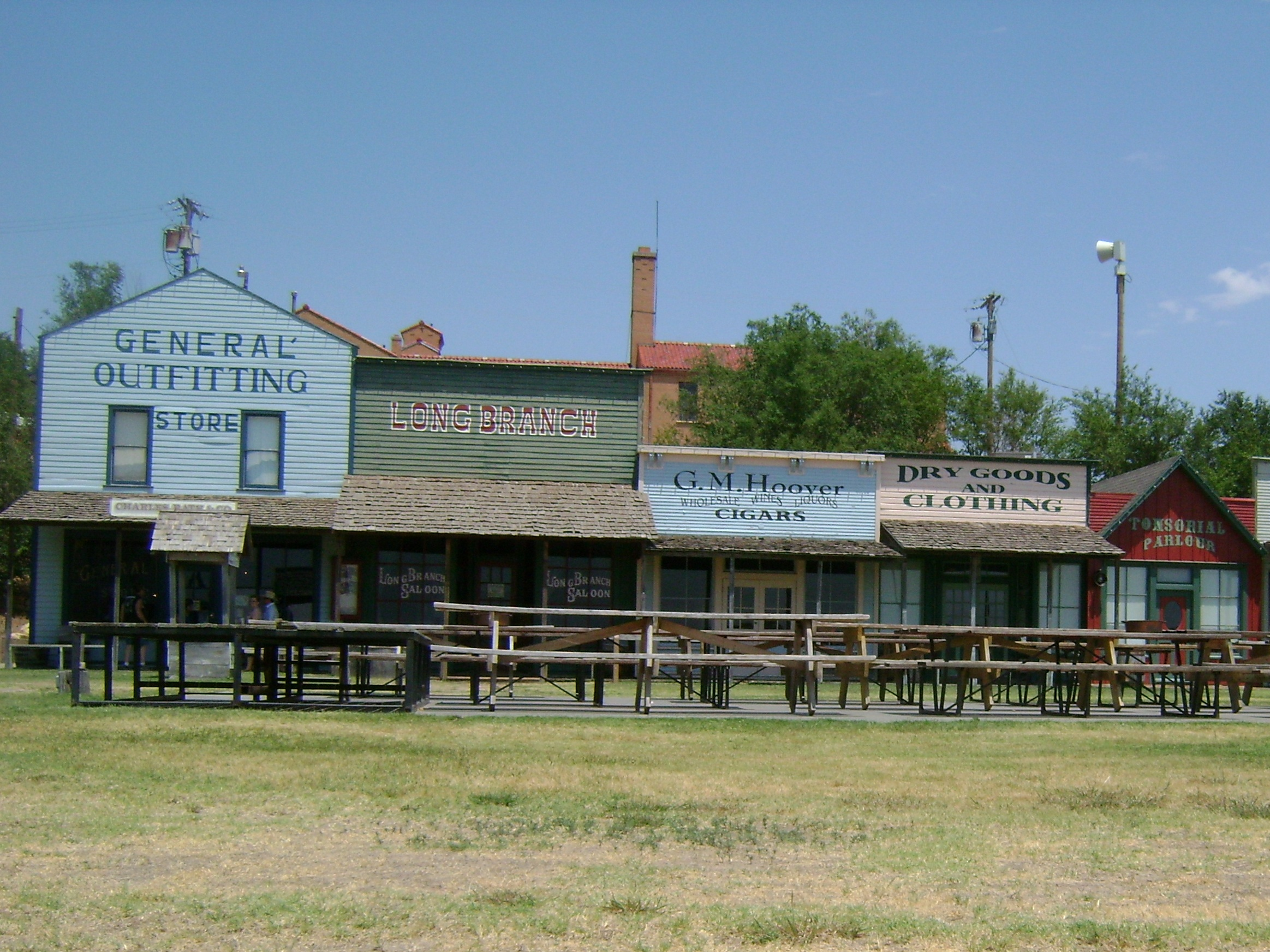
Shops on the west end of the "town" portion of the museum

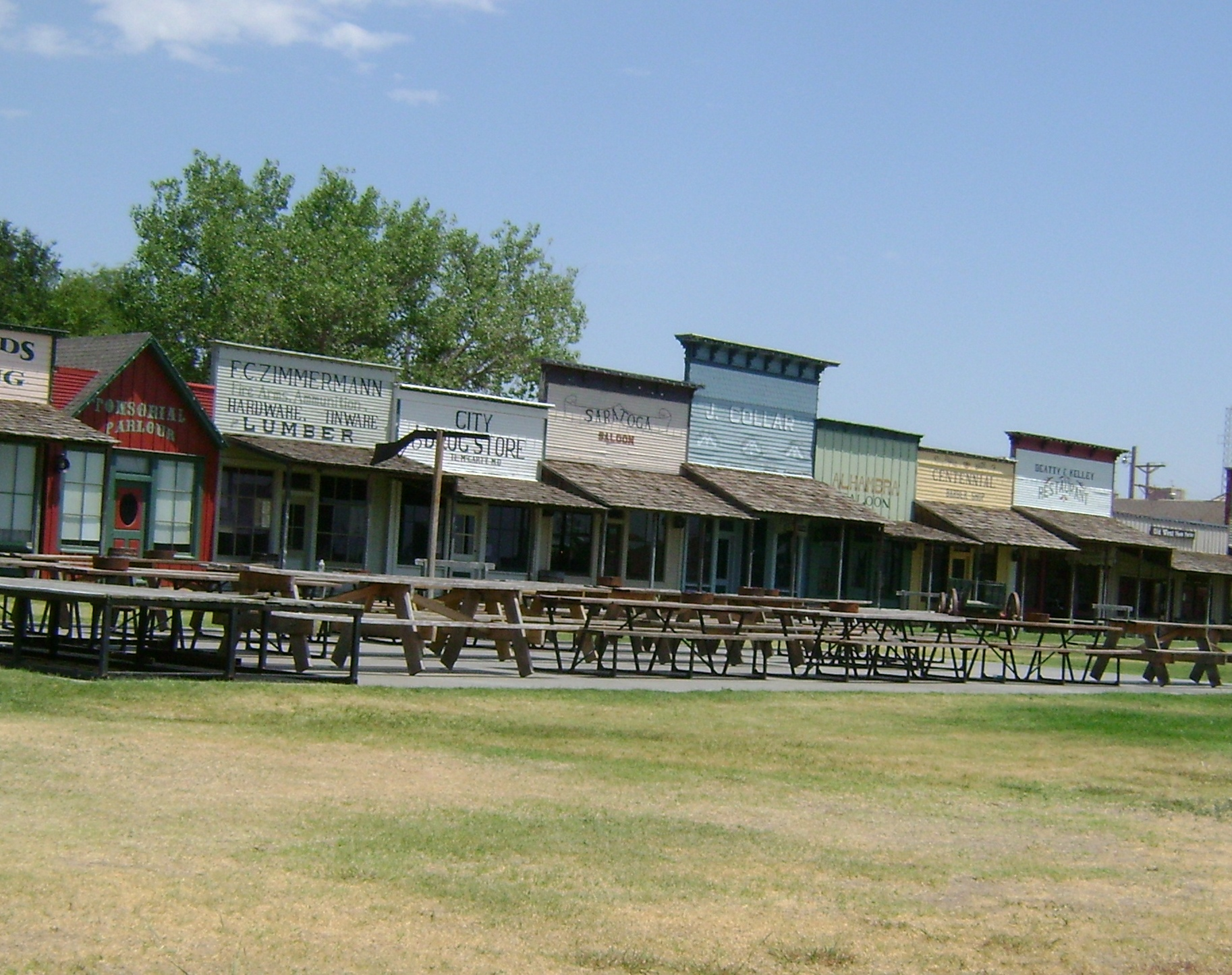
Shops in the east end of the "town" portion of the museum

Boot Hill Museum is an American historical museum located in Dodge City, Kansas.

A non-profit entity, the mission of the museum is to preserve the history of the Old West with emphasis on Dodge City. There are over 20,000 artifacts in the complex, including more than 200 original guns. In addition to its historical and educational focus, the museum also provides entertainment for visitors in the form of simulated gunfights and saloon shows.

The Kansas Cowboy Hall of Fame is housed in the museum complex.

== Origin of the name ==
The museum is named after the Boot Hill Cemetery, which sits on the northeast corner of the museum complex. "Boot Hill" was a common name for cemeteries used to bury gunslingers in the American West. The term refers to the fact that these men had "died with their boots on" – in other words, in a violent manner, whether in a gunfight or perhaps even by hanging.

== Incidents ==
On July 6, 1992, the "dry goods store" portion of the museum caught fire. It has since been rebuilt.

In July 2010, a local resident was badly burned by a flash fire during a Bull Fry and Bash event at the museum. Following this accident, new fryers were purchased as a safety measure.

== Role in Heritage District plans ==
Dodge City has embarked on a plan to develop a Heritage District, of which expanding the Boot Hill Museum will be a particular focus. The expansion of the museum would highlight the old heritage of the town, but the Heritage District will also include a water park, additional hotels, new restaurants, and an RV park.
