= Edward Payson Ripley =

American businessman (1845–1920)

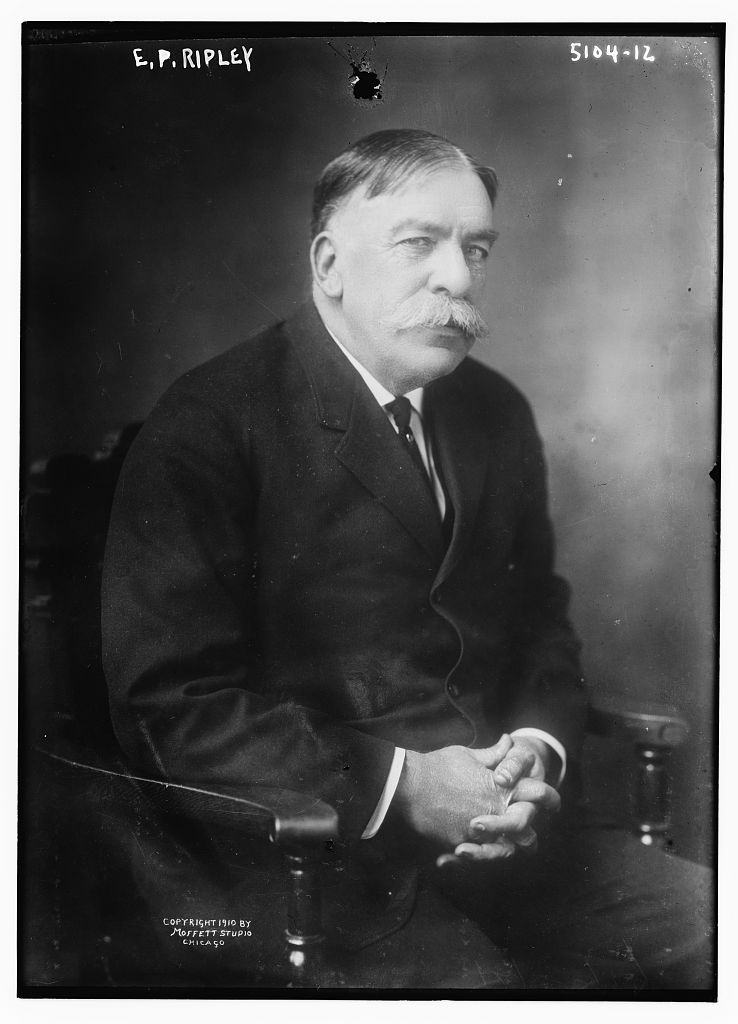
Edward Payson Ripley in 1920

Edward Payson Ripley (October 30, 1845 – February 4, 1920), sometimes referred to as Edward P. Ripley or E. P. Ripley, was the fourteenth president of the Atchison, Topeka and Santa Fe Railway.

== Youth and education ==
Ripley was born on October 30, 1845, in Dorchester, Massachusetts. Although his family had settled in the American colonies as early as 1638, his family's most prestigious quality was that there were nine blacksmiths in his ancestry.

Ripley attended public schools, entering the workforce in 1862 at a dry goods merchant's in Boston. Six years later, Ripley started his first job for a railroad as a freight agent for the Pennsylvania Railroad. After two years, he transferred to the Chicago, Burlington and Quincy Railroad as a clerk. He worked his way up through various positions including New England agent, general eastern agent, general freight agent, traffic manager and finally general manager. In 1890 Ripley left Burlington for a few years to work for the Milwaukee Road.

== Santa Fe leadership ==
On December 1, 1895, as the Atchison, Topeka and Santa Fe Railway emerged from receivership, Ripley became Santa Fe's president. After the financial scandals that brought on the railroad's bankruptcy in the earlier part of the decade, Ripley had his work cut out for him to restore the public opinion of the railroad.

In 1906 Ripley implemented new management to increase the effiency and loyalty of Mexican workers. A policy was initiated to encourage Mexican workers to bring their families to live with them on company property in attempt to recreate traditional family values. The company expected that family reunification would inforce traditional values and increase the idea that the men needed to provide for their families. The policy was a success and multiple boxcar settlements appeared in locations along the Kansas railways, including the Mexican Village in Dodge City.

He served as president until January 1, 1920. He is interred at Bronswood Cemetery in Oak Brook, Illinois.

== Legacy ==
A Liberty Ship, hull number 2690, was named Edward P. Ripley in his honor (see List of Liberty ships).

Disneyland Railroad locomotive number 2, a 4-4-0 built in 1954 by the Disney shops, was named E. P. Ripley in his honor.

Ripley, California, is a town named after him and established in 1920 at the endpoint of the California Southern Railroad's (unrelated to the railroad linking San Diego and Barstow) line from Rice, California through Blythe; the line was envisioned as a shortcut to San Diego. The Arizona and California Railroad last operated trains in this line in 2007 before abandoning most of the line in 2009.

Ripley, Oklahoma, once on Santa Fe tracks, was also named after him.

EP Ripley Park, was established in the heart of Marceline Missouri (Boyhood Hometown Of Walt Disney)in 1898. Marceline was established by the Atchison, Topeka and Santa Fe Railway in 1888 as a division point between Kansas City and Chicago.

== Footnotes ==
Preceded by Aldace F. Walker	President of the Atchison, Topeka and Santa Fe Railway; 1896 – 1920	Succeeded by William Benson Storey
