= Adolph Gluck =

Hungarian-American politician (1843–1917)

Adolph Gluck (1843–1917) was a Hungarian-American pioneer, businessman, and politician. Born in Hungary, he immigrated to the U.S. in the 1850s with his parents, settling in Missouri. He went on to fight for the Union in the Civil War, later moving to Dodge City, Kansas, in 1878. He served on the city council and as mayor of Dodge City. Gluck was Jewish.

== See also ==
- List of mayors of Dodge City, Kansas
