= Kansas Cowboy Hall of Fame =

Hall of Fame for Cowboys

Coordinates: 37°45′13″N 100°01′17″W

- Established: 2002
- Location: 500 W. Wyatt Earp Blvd., Dodge City, KS, 67801
- Type: Hall of fame
- Website: KCHF

The Kansas Cowboy Hall of Fame, is located at the Boot Hill Museum in Dodge City, Kansas. The first inductees were selected in 2002.

== Inductees ==
2002

- Don Goodnight

2003

- Henry Gardiner
- Jim Gray
- Leonard Hampton
- Richard Ingland
- Ron Long

2004

- Horace Greely "Buck" Adams
- Jim Hoy
- Charles "Floyd" Rumford Jr.
- Otis W. Jennings
- Johnny Western

2005

- John J. Vanier
- C. Robert Haywood
- Gerald Roberts
- Don Fisher
- Harold L. "Buddy" Heaton

2006

- Jim Gilliland
- Harry E. Chrisman
- Carvel "Kurly" Hebb
- Tom Finney
- Milburn Stone

2007

- Dan D. Casement
- Bill Kurtis
- Melvin Fields
- Buck Mead
- Lance Brittan

2008

- Alfred Barby
- Don Rowlison
- John McBeth
- Asher Crowley
- Marion McLain

2009

- Duane Walker
- Harold Dawley
- Wayne Dunafon
- Bill Barnes
- H. Russell Moss

2010

- Fred Germann
- David Dary
- Sonny Worrell
- Merv Wilson
- Earl Kuhn

2011

- George Herrmann
- Joseph McCoy
- Gail McComb
- Harold Grinstead
- Charlie Norton

2012

- William F. Ebbutt
- John F. Valentine
- Ernie Love
- Willis Ray Negus
- Geffrey Dawson

2013

- Raymond E. Adams Jr.
- V. James "Jim" Sherer
- Bobby Berger
- Kenneth & Marshall Hoy
- Stan Herd

2014

- Bob & Wayne Alexander
- Fredric R. Young
- Bud Sankey
- Dusty Anderson
- Barry Ward

2015

- Olis Goodnight
- Gary & Margaret Kraisinger
- Harley Dean Gilbert
- Gerald "Jerry" Nelson Peck
- Orin Friesen

2016 - "Year of the Cowgirl"

- Jane Koger
- Joyce Thierer
- Margie Roberts Hart
- Vicki Johnson
- Martina McBride

2017 "Honoring Couples"

- Andy & Helen Ebbutt Olson
- Merritt & Elizabeth Beeson
- Pete & "Boots" Tucker
- Larry "Dee" & Phyllis Scherich
- Lem & Blanche McKenney Hunter

2018

- Loren Doll
- Charlie Meade
- Roland Hein
- Barry Elliot
- Virginia Robinson Moore

2019

- Norman Lee Giles
- David V. Williams
- Will Lowe
- Jim Arnold
- Brent Harris

2020

- Orson E. "Bud" Alexander
- Charles "Walter" Couch
- Faye Louise (Peck) Heath
- Keith L. Downer
- John E. "Cowboy Jack" Steinmitz

2021

- Lawrence and Gilbert Krier
- Michael Grauer
- Wendell Tranter
- Bill Brewer
- Dr. R.C. Trotter

2022

- Rosie Clymer
- George Henrichs
- Arlene Lemar
- Van Haines
- Ron Wilson
