= Hamilton Bell =

American politician

Hamilton Butler Bell (1853–1947) was an American pioneer, businessman, politician, sheriff, and Deputy U.S. Marshal. He served as mayor of Dodge City, Kansas.

== See also ==
- List of mayors of Dodge City, Kansas
