= George M. Hoover =

Canadian-American politician (born 1847)

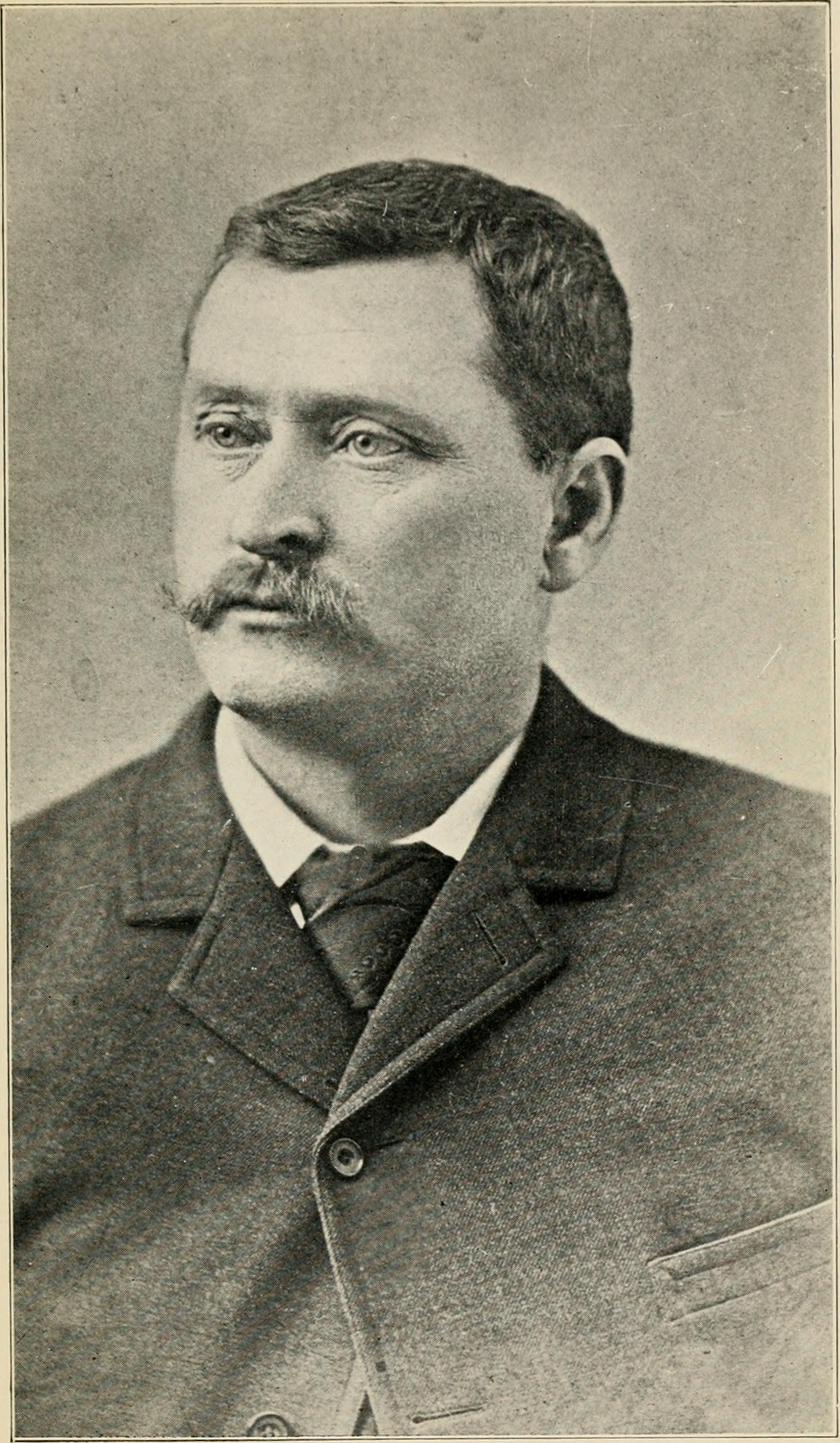
Hoover in 1872

George Merritt Hoover (August 8, 1847 – 1914) was a Canadian-American pioneer, businessman, and politician. Known as the founder of Dodge City, Kansas, he was the town's second settler (arriving in 1872), founded the town's first business, founded the town's first bank, and was the town's first elected mayor. Hoover served four terms as mayor of Dodge City and two terms in the Kansas Legislature.

== See also ==
- List of mayors of Dodge City, Kansas
