= Joyce Warshaw =

American educator and politician

Joyce Warshaw is an American educator and politician who served as the mayor of Dodge City, Kansas, from 2015 to 2020. She was also a Republican candidate for District 38 of the Kansas State Senate in 2016. Warshaw resigned in 2020 after receiving threats for supporting a mask mandate during the COVID-19 pandemic in Kansas.

== See also ==
- List of mayors of Dodge City, Kansas
