= William Benson Storey =

President of the Atchison, Topeka and Santa Fe Railway

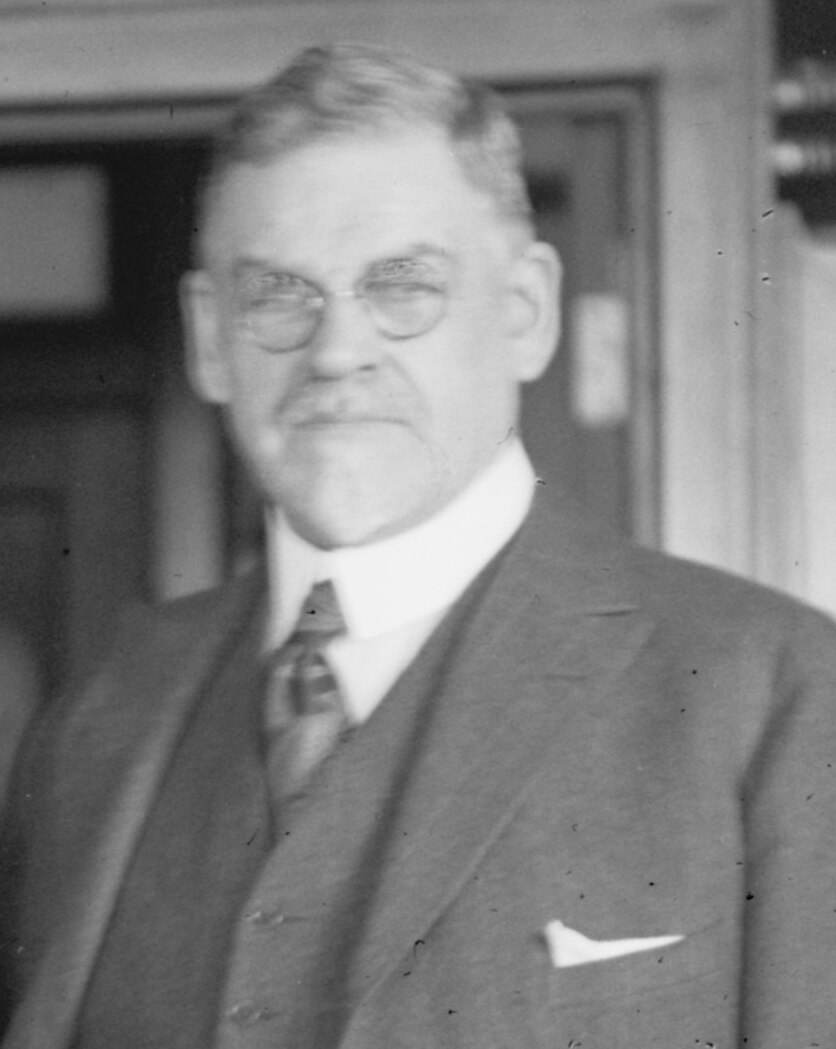
- Storey, c. 1910s–1920s
- Born: William Benson Storey Jr. November 17, 1857; San Francisco, California, U.S.
- Died: October 24, 1940 (aged 82)
- Education: University of California
- Occupations: Engineer; railroad executive
- Years active: 1876–1940

William Benson Storey, Jr. (November 17, 1857 – October 24, 1940) was the fifteenth president of the Atchison, Topeka and Santa Fe Railway.

Storey was born November 17, 1857, in San Francisco, California, the son of William Bainbridge Storey, an express, stagecoach and newspaper agent, and Ellen Dean (Benson) Storey. His family moved around following his father's career until 1866 when they settled in Colfax.

in 1876, Storey started his railroad career with the Southern Pacific Railroad as a stake driver on the line between Oakland and Berkeley. He used his earnings from that summer and the following year to finance his college education, and he graduated from the University of California in 1881 with a mechanical engineering degree. He hired out with the Central Pacific Railroad and soon found himself working throughout Idaho, Utah and South Dakota as well as the California coast.

Storey's association with the Santa Fe began when he was hired by the San Francisco and San Joaquin Valley Railway (a Santa Fe subsidiary formed to make the railroad's connection to San Francisco) as chief engineer. He transferred to the Santa Fe in 1903 as chief engineer and worked his way up to the vice presidency of the Santa Fe in 1909. In 1917 he was appointed as the federal manager, and three years later, on January 1, 1920, he succeeded Edward Payson Ripley as president of the Santa Fe. He served as president until his retirement from the position on May 2, 1933. Storey remained on the board of directors until his death in 1940, a year after his successor's own death.

Preceded by Edward Payson Ripley	President of Atchison, Topeka and Santa Fe Railway; 1920 – 1933	Succeeded by Samuel T. Bledsoe
