= Cargill Meat Solutions =

North American meat-processing subsidiary of Cargill

- Industry: Meat processing
- Predecessor: Excel Packing Company
- Founded: 1936 in Chicago, Illinois
- Headquarters: Wichita, Kansas, United States
- Area served: North America
- Key people: Jody Horner President
- Products: beef, turkey, food service
- Parent: Cargill

Cargill Meat Solutions is a subsidiary of the Minneapolis-based multinational agribusiness giant Cargill Inc, that comprises Cargill's North American beef, turkey, food service and food distribution businesses. Cargill Meat Solutions' corporate office is located in Wichita, Kansas, United States. Jody Horner is the division's president.

By May 2, 2020, Cargill's High River, Alberta facility in Canada, was the site of one of the largest COVID-19 outbreaks in North America with one death and 921 confirmed coronavirus cases among employees—representing about 50 percent of the facility's 2,000 employees. After closing for two weeks, the plant reopened on May 4. By May 6, of the 5,893 confirmed cases in the entire province of Alberta, the province's health services had "linked 1,560 cases to the Cargill facility."

== History ==
Cargill Meat Solutions is a subsidiary of Cargill Inc—a multi-generational family-owned and operated, multinational agribusiness giant. Cargill was America's Largest Private Company, with revenues of US$106.30 billion in 2008 and 151,500 employees, according to Forbes.

The operation's history can be traced to the Excel Packing Company, which was formed in Chicago in 1936. In 1941, Excel moved to Wichita, and was incorporated as Kansas Beef Industries in 1970. In 1974, Kansas Beef Industries merged with Missouri Beef Packers and the company was renamed MBPXL, reflecting the merged entities, MBP for Missouri Beef Packers and XL for Kansas Beef Industries' original name, Excel.

Cargill acquired MBPXL in 1979, and the company's name was changed to Excel in 1982, reflecting its early history. Under its new name, Excel purchased Spencer Beef from Land O'Lakes in 1983, which added operations in Spencer, Iowa, Oakland, Iowa, and Schuyler, Nebraska. The sale was challenged on anti-trust grounds by a smaller competitor, Monfort of Colorado; while Monfort prevailed in lower courts, in 1986 the Supreme Court of the United States ruled that the sale was legal.

In 1987, Excel entered the pork processing business when it acquired plants from Hormel in Ottumwa, Iowa, and Oscar Mayer in Beardstown, Illinois. In 2001, Excel purchased Emmpak Foods, a maker of cooked meats, deli meats, frozen hamburger patties and case-ready ground beef.

In a 1988 New York Times article reported that together, three meat processing companies -- "Excel Inc., a subsidiary of Cargill Inc.", Conagra Brands, and Iowa Beef Processors -- "buy, slaughter and sell nearly three-quarters of the [United States]'s grain-fattened cattle." ConAgra's former meat processing holdings are now owned by JBS USA, and IBP was purchased by Tyson Foods and is now known as Tyson Fresh Meats.

In 2004, the division's name was changed from Excel to Cargill Meat Solutions. In 2005, Cargill brought back the Excel name as a brand for the division's "everyday" meat product line. In July 2015, Cargill announced it was selling its U.S. pork processing business to JBS USA for $1.45 billion.

== Food safety ==
In October 2007, Cargill recalled nearly 845,000 pounds (383,000 kg) of ground beef after an outbreak of E. coli O157:H7 occurred in North Carolina.

In October 2002, the Emmpak meat packing plant recalled 2,800,000 pounds (1,300,000 kg) of ground beef, also linked to an E. coli breakout. Emmpak is owned by the Excel Corporation, a subsidiary of Cargill.

== Cargill Proteins ==
In Canada, Cargill has "integrated beef processing facilities" called Cargill Proteins—one which is located just north of High River, Alberta—a town with a population 12,000 people, and a second facility in Guelph, Ontario. The High River plant processes about 4,500 head of cattle a day, which represents about 36 percent of Canada's beef producing capacity.

== COVID-19 pandemic outbreak ==
A Cargill meat processing plant in High River, Alberta located about 37 miles (60 km) south of the city of Calgary, was the site of the largest COVID-19 outbreak in North America with two deaths, 946 employees who tested positive, and links to 1,560 cases in Alberta by May 6. The plant employs 2,000 people.

On April 17, 2020 Deena Hinshaw, the Chief Medical Officer of Alberta reported that "households with connections" to the Cargill facility represented 358 confirmed cases of coronavirus. By April 20, when Hinshaw reported the number had increased to 484—which included 360 of the 2,100 employees—the facility was temporarily closed for two weeks all employees of the facility were recommended for virus testing. A representative of the Alberta chapter of the Canadian Union of Public Employees (CUPE) said that "cases at Cargill were causing a cross-contamination"—of the five workers at High River's Seasons Retirement Communities who tested positive for the coronavirus, three were married to Cargill workers.

The CBC reported that Cargill slaughterhouse workers were pressured to return to their jobs after testing positive for COVID-19 and being legally required to quarantine themselves.

Hearings before the Alberta Labour Relations Board on a stop-work order, sought by the United Food and Commercial Workers (UFCW) Union that represents Cargill workers, began on the weekend prior to the May 4 opening. By May 4, the UFCW said that conditions at the Cargill facility were "unsafe for workers".

The plant re-opened on May 4. By May 6, of the 5,893 confirmed cases in the entire province of Alberta, the province's health services had "linked 1,560 cases to the Cargill facility." As of May 12, 18 of the 37 inspectors at the High River plant had COVID-19.

On April 13, 2020, 130 workers at a Cargill meatpacking plant in Hazleton, Pennsylvania were diagnosed with coronavirus, and the plant closed.

== See also ==
- COVID-19 pandemic in Alberta – Ongoing COVID-19 viral pandemic in Alberta, Canada
- Impact of the 2019–20 coronavirus pandemic on the meat industry in the United States – Impact of COVID-19
