= Die with your boots on =

Idiom for working or fighting to the end

"Die with your boots on" is an idiom referring to dying while fighting, working, or performing some other action. A person who "dies with their boots on" keeps working to their last days, with the implication that they die while living their life as usual, and not of old age and being bedridden with illness or infirmity.

The "die with your boots on" idiom originates from frontier towns in the 19th-century American West. Some sources, such as the American Heritage Dictionary of Idioms, say that the phrase may have originally alluded to soldiers who died on active duty. The Oxford Dictionary of Idioms says: "Die with your boots on was apparently first used in the late 19th century of deaths of cowboys and others in the American West who were killed in gun battles or hanged." Cassell's Dictionary of Slang adds that from the late 17th century until the early 19th century the expression meant "to be hanged", and from the mid 17th century until the mid 19th century "die in one's shoes" meant the same thing.

== Examples ==
- They Died With Their Boots On, a 1941 Western film about General George Armstrong Custer
- "Die with Your Boots On," a song from Iron Maiden's 1983 album Piece of Mind
- "Dying with Your Boots On," a song from Scarface's 1993 album The World Is Yours
- "Die with Your Boots On," a song by Toby Keith
- "Play a Train Song," a song by Todd Snider, and covered by Robert Earl Keen on his 2011 album Ready For Confetti
- Referenced in the lyrics of Genesis' song "Ballad of Big," from their 1978 album ...And Then There Were Three.... ("...and he died like all good cowboys, with his boots on, next to his men.")
- Referenced in the lyrics of Gil Scott-Heron's song "'B' Movie." ("... Cliches like 'Get off my planet by sundown!' more so than cliches like 'He died with his boots on.")
- Referenced in Secondhand Lions, a 2003 film by Tim McCanlies. ("She died with her boots on, that's the main thing", "They went out with their boots on.")

== See also ==
- Boothill
- Iron Maiden
