= Samuel T. Bledsoe =

President of Atchison, Topeka and Santa Fe Railway

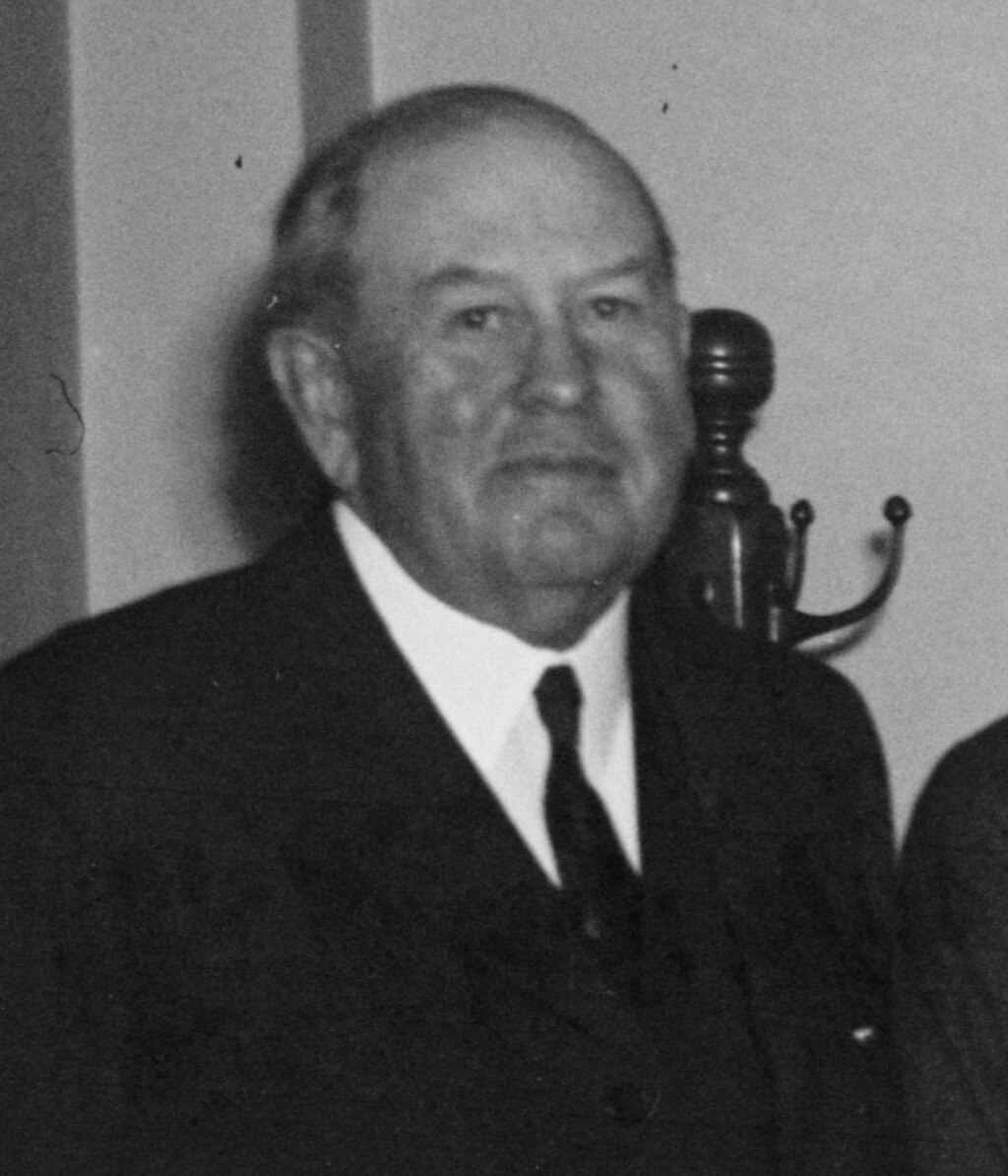
- Bledsoe in 1938
- Born: Samuel Thomas Bledsoe; May 12, 1868; Clinton County, Kentucky, U.S.
- Died: March 8, 1939 (aged 70); Chicago, Illinois, U.S.

Samuel Thomas Bledsoe (May 12, 1868 – March 8, 1939) was the 16th president of Atchison, Topeka and Santa Fe Railway.

== Early life and family ==
Bledsoe was born in Clinton County, Kentucky, on May 12, 1868. His education took him through various public and private schools in the area; he later attended the Southern Normal School and the Bowling Green Business College. He then took up teaching from 1885 to 1887.

== Railroad career ==
In 1888, Bledsoe moved to Texas where he studied law at the University of Texas School of Law; he was admitted to the bar in 1890 and began his practice specializing in land and railroad issues in the Indian and Oklahoma territories. His first work for the Santa Fe Railroad began in 1895, which eventually led to his appointment as the railroad's general counsel in 1908. Bledsoe worked his way up through management to succeed William Benson Storey on May 2, 1933, as president of the railroad, serving in that position until his death on March 8, 1939. Bledsoe was the first Santa Fe president to be promoted from a career path that did not lead through the operations or technical aspects of the railroad. During Bledsoe's time as president, he worked to reduce the railroad's operating expenses and bring profitability during the Great Depression; it was also during his term that the railroad introduced diesel locomotives into its motive power fleet and launched new passenger trains such as the famed Super Chief.

Bledsoe also served as a director of the Railway Express Agency and the Continental Illinois Bank and Trust Company.

== Published works ==
- Bledsoe, Samuel T. (January 1937). "Consolidation and Coördination Problems". Proceedings of the Academy of Political Science. 17 (2). The Academy of Political Science: 114–126. doi:10.2307/1172539. JSTOR 1172539.

== Legacy ==
The town of Bledsoe, Texas, was named in his honor.

Preceded by William Benson Storey	President of Atchison, Topeka and Santa Fe Railway; 1933 – 1939	Succeeded by Edward Engel
