= Dodge City Public Library =

Dodge City Public Library, located north of downtown at 1001 N 2nd Ave, Dodge City, Kansas, is the city's main library. A member of the Southwest Kansas Library System, it has a collection of approximately 123,000 volumes, and it circulates more than 189,000 items annually. It offers several services to the public, including public internet access, notary service, and programs for children and adults.

== History ==
- Carnegie Center for the Arts
- U.S. National Register of Historic Places
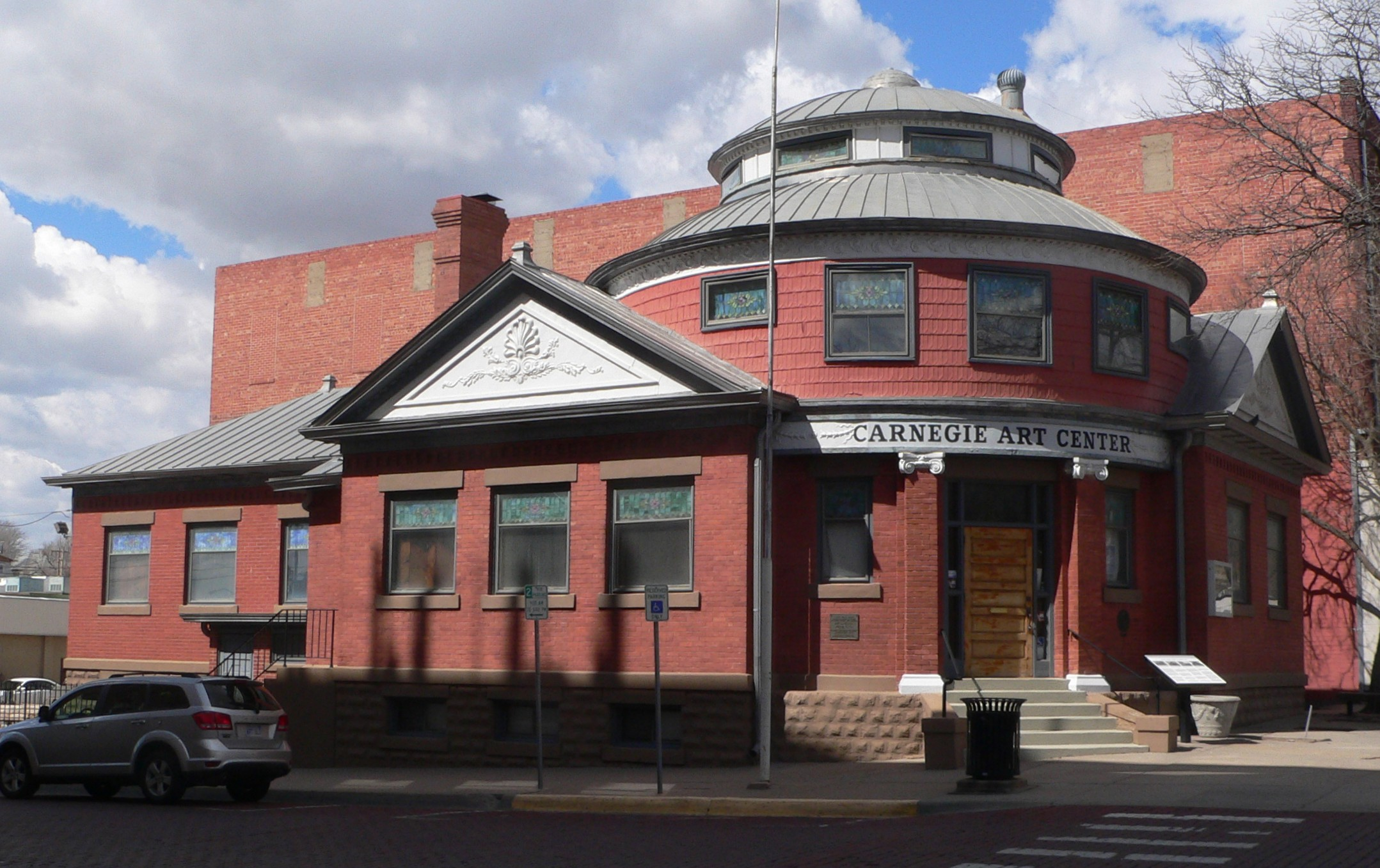
- Former Dodge City Public Library, now the Carnegie Center for the Arts
- Location: 2nd and Spruce Aves., Dodge City, Kansas
- Coordinates: 37.754589°N 100.019314°W
- Built: 1907
- Architect: Squires, C. W.
- Architectural style: Free Eclectic style
- NRHP reference No.: 79000954
- Added to NRHP: March 26, 1979

In January 1905, local women's clubs in Dodge City encouraged judge E.H. Madison to ask philanthropist Andrew Carnegie to fund a library building for the city. Carnegie responded with a grant of $7500; construction of a building at the downtown intersection of 2nd and Spruce began in 1906, and the library opened in February 1907. It remained in the Carnegie building until 1970, when it moved to 606 First Avenue due to size constraints of the original building. In 1979, the building was listed in the National Register of Historic Places. In 1981, the Dodge City Arts Council obtained funds to preserve the original Carnegie building, operating it as the Carnegie Center for the Arts.

In 1980, construction began on a new, larger location for the library at 1001 N 2nd Avenue. The library moved to this location in 1981, and it remains in this location today. In 2019, the Kansas Heritage Center, a historical archive and research library, was moved from Dodge City USD 443 to the Dodge City Public Library.

== Other city libraries ==
The other library in the city is the Dodge City Community College Library, which holds more than 30,000 volumes and serves as a federal depository library.
