= Louis Pearce Jr. =

American businessman and rancher known for leading the Houston Livestock Show and Rodeo

Louis M. Pearce Jr.
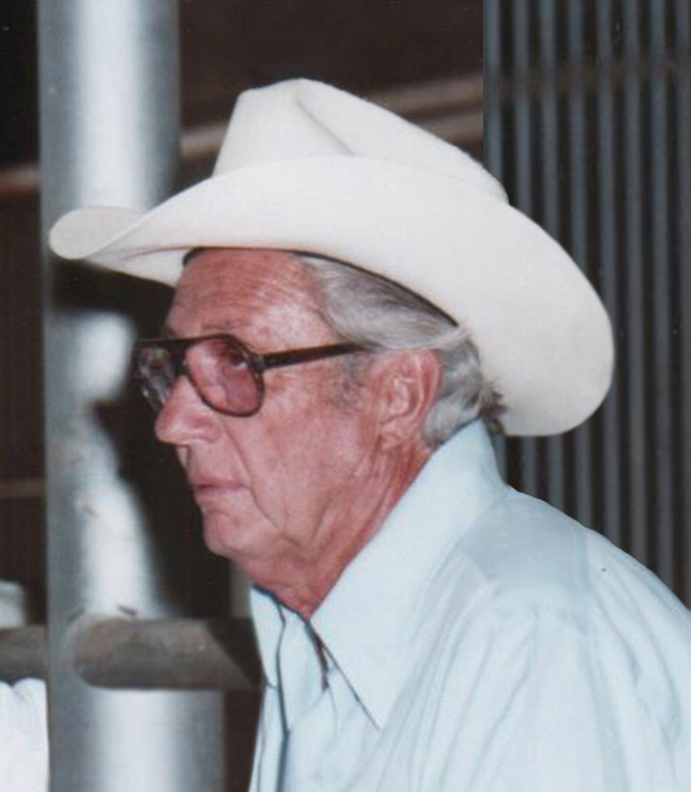
- 1982
- Born: Louis Monroe Pearce Jr; February 17, 1917; Houston, Texas, US
- Died: December 26, 2012 (aged 95); Houston
- Education: Business administration
- Alma mater: University of Texas
- Occupations: President of Waukesha-Pearce Industries, Inc. Quarter Horse breeder, rancher
- Known for: "Mr. Houston Livestock Show"
- Notable work: Chairman of Texas Alcoholic Beverage Commission; Served as CEO/President of Houston Livestock Show and Rodeo
- Honors: AQHA Hall of Fame; NCHA Members Hall of Fame; Texas Cowboys Hall of Fame; Texas Heroes Hall of Honor; Louis Pearce Jr. Pavilion, Texas A&M University campus Dreams and Memories located in Carruth Plaza at Reliant Park; Houston Livestock Show and Rodeo Louis M. Pearce Jr. Board Dining Room

Louis M. Pearce Jr. (February 17, 1917 – December 26, 2012) was an American businessman and rancher known for leading the Houston Livestock Show and Rodeo.

Pearce attended the University of Texas at Austin from 1936 to 1939 where he majored in business administration. He was honored by the university in 1990 as a Distinguished Alumni. He was an avid polo player, and trained polo ponies at a ranch in New Mexico for a short time after college. In 1938, he began a commercial cattle operation on land he acquired in Brazoria, Atascosa and Maverick Counties in Texas. He also bred 357 registered Quarter Horses including AQHA Register of Merit earners, the AQHA Champion Stallion Especial, and 1975 AQHA World Champion Senior Cutting Horse Cricket's Dollye. When asked during an interview how he wanted to be remembered, he said "When it's all said and done, I want to be remembered as a cowboy." Pearce was inducted into both the AQHA Hall of Fame and NCHA Members Hall of Fame. Pearce volunteered with the Houston Livestock Show and Rodeo and was elected to its board of directors in 1961. His role as vice president ran from 1963 to 1965. He spent one year as the show's secretary in 1966. He filled the role of show president from 1967 to 1971. In 1975, the board elected him to serve on the executive committee.

== Early life ==
Pearce was born to Louis Monroe Pearce Sr. and Rosa May Pearce in Houston, Texas. In 1924, his father founded Portable Rotary Rig Company, a company that built steam powered drill rigs at the peak of the oilfield boom in Texas, and from that Waukesha–Pearce Industries Inc. evolved.

Pearce attended San Jacinto High School, then moved to San Antonio where he finished high school and furthered his education by attending Texas Military Institute (TMI), the oldest Episcopal college preparatory school in the American Southwest, and graduated in 1936. He then attended the University of Texas at Austin from 1936 to 1939, and majored in Business Administration. After college, he worked for a short time on a ranch in New Mexico where he played polo and trained polo ponies. In 1940, Pearce enlisted in the US Cavalry where he earned the rank of sergeant. He later attended Officer Candidate School at Fort Riley, Kansas, and became a commissioned officer. In 1945, he was discharged with the rank of major.

== Ranching ==
In 1938, Pearce started ranching which included raising Braford and Brangus beef cattle on his ranches in Brazoria, Atascosa and Maverick Counties in Texas. He also bred and raised Quarter Horses for AQHA racing, halter and various other performance events including cutting. Pearce owned Cricket's Dollye, 1975 AQHA World Champion Sr. Cutting ridden by Sonny Rice of Rosharon, Texas.

== Houston Livestock Show and Rodeo ==
Pearce volunteered with the Houston Livestock Show and Rodeo for which he also served on the executive committee as president and CEO. He remained an active executive committee member until his death in 2012. As a result of his dedication and significant contributions to the event, Pearce became known as "Mr. Houston Livestock Show".

There is a bronze statue in Carruth Plaza at Reliant Park titled Dreams and Memories by sculptor Jim Reno that was dedicated to Pearce in 1986. The statue depicts a young boy standing with his hands on a calf in front of him while looking up a cowboy that bears a striking resemblance to Louis Pearce Jr. sitting on a horse looking down kindly at the boy. The depiction represents the past and future of the Houston Livestock Show and Rodeo. The Louis M. Pearce Jr. Board Dining Room at the Houston Livestock Show and Rodeo was also named in his honor.
