= Buster Welch =

American cutting horse trainer (1928–2022)

- Birth name: Fay Owen Welch
- Occupation: Horse trainer
- Discipline: NCHA cutting AQHA performance horses
- Born: May 23, 1928; Sterling City, Texas, U.S.
- Died: June 12, 2022 (aged 94); Abilene, Texas, U.S.
- Spouse(s): Sheila Dolin Welch
- Major wins/Championships: 4 times NCHA World Champion, 5 times NCHA World Championship Futurity
- Lifetime achievements: NCHA Rider Hall of Fame, NCHA Member Hall of Fame, AQHA Hall of Fame, Texas Cowboy Hall of Fame

Significant horses
- Marion's Girl, Chickasha Mike, Money's Glo, Chickasha Glo, Rey Jay's Pete, Dry Doc, Mr San Peppy and Peppy San Badger

Fay Owen "Buster" Welch (May 23, 1928 – June 12, 2022) was an American cutting horse trainer and inductee into the NCHA Members Hall of Fame, American Quarter Horse Hall of Fame, NCHA Rider Hall of Fame, and Texas Cowboy Hall of Fame. Buster was chosen as the recipient of the 2012 National Golden Spur Award for his "outstanding contributions to the ranching and livestock industry".

Buster won the NCHA World Championship four times, and the NCHA World Championship Futurity five times. The most notable horses he trained include Marion's Girl, Chickasha Mike, Money's Glo who he trained and in 1962 won the first NCHA World Championship Futurity, in 1963 he won it on Chickasha Glo, in 1966 on Rey Jay's Pete, in 1971 on Dry Doc, and in 1977 on Peppy San Badger. He won the NCHA World Championship on Marion's Girl in 1954 and 1956. He trained Mr San Peppy and won the NCHA World Championship in 1974 and 1976.

== Early life ==
Buster Welch was born on May 23, 1928, near Sterling City, Texas. He was born and raised to early childhood near the divide of the Colorado and Concho Rivers, north of Sterling City, Texas. His mother died shortly after his birth, leaving his grandparents to raise him for a time on their stock farm. His father remarried, and moved the family to Midland, Texas, where he worked for Atlantic Richfield. While still in grade school, Buster had run away from home several times, and would skip school to spend time at the stockyards where he learned to ride broncs. At age 13, he left home permanently and landed a job breaking horses, working large herds of cattle, and tending to various other ranch chores for cattlemen Foy and Leonard Proctor in Midland, Texas. It was there that Buster learned the basics of riding and working cattle that followed him into adulthood.

After leaving Proctor's, Buster worked for many prominent ranches such as the 6666 Ranch, Pitchfork Ranch, King Ranch, Long X, and a few other ranches where he developed his skills working with rough stock and cattle. His goal was to one day have a ranch of his own.

== Personal life ==
In the early 1980s, Buster and his wife Sheila, lived and worked in Kingsville, Texas, on the King Ranch. Sheila rode cutting horses and competed in cutting horse competition. She won several championship titles, and earned over $1 million in NCHA earnings. In the late 2000s, they sold their 25,000 acre Double Mountain River Ranch, and moved to the adjacent 18,000 acre Chriswell Ranch. They eventually moved to Rotan, Texas, and raised cattle under the "B Lazy W" brand to supply the retail demand for naturally fed beef. Buster continued to train cutting horses and managed to expand the ranch to include both leased and owned land comprising over 60,000 acres. Sheila died on December 7, 2014, at age 76. He died on June 12, 2022, at his home in Abilene, Texas at the age of 94.

== Career ==
When he was 18 years old, Welch took advantage of the new National Cutting Horse Association, and by the early 1950s had begun to establish himself as a horseman able to train a horse to "some degree of finish". Also, cutting horses had begun to really make their mark as contest livestock. Welch had always planned to establish himself in cattle ranching and was running 800 head on leased land when a drought "focused his options".

One of the locations where Welch worked for a ranch was for Homer Ingham in Las Vegas, New Mexico. Welch claims that Ingham, "gave me my first real opportunity in training horses". Welch broke and trained horses for him and also for Warren Shoemaker, his neighbor. On Shoemaker's urging, Welch decided to purchase a six-year-old unbroken stallion named Chickasha Mike for $125 from Ingham. Chickasha Mike was by American Quarter Horse Hall of Fame sire Billy Clegg. Welch broke Mike, used him in his ranch work, and for cutting. Since the horse seemed to have an aptitude for cutting, Welch took him to some local contests. In 1952, Mike won his first five events. Awhile later Welch sold Mike to Bill Hale of Odessa, Texas, for $8,500, and Hale sold him to Leonard Proctor, Welch's previous employer.

Welch's first competition on a cutting horse was on Chickasha Mike. By showing Chickasha Mike as a cutting horse, Welch established the horse, an American Quarter Horse, as a notable sire of cutting horse champions. Due to Welch's training, Chickasha Mike became the 1956 NCHA Reserve World Champion. Proctor owned the horse when he won the 1956 NCHA Reserve World Championship.

An oilman named Marion Flynt of Midland, Texas, saw Welch's first competition on Chickasha Mike. Flynt was impressed enough to send Welch his best mare, Marion's Girl, by Silver Wimpy and out of Scharbauer mare, to train. The mare was foaled in 1948. Flynt had purchased the mare from her breeder, prominent rancher Clarence Scharbauer Jr., when she was 2 years old for $2,000. She won back $1,677 of her purchase price in one of her first competitions. Welch took the mare from coast to coast to campaign her when she was 6 and 8 years old. Under Welch's tutelage and expert riding, Marion's Girl won the NCHA World Championship in 1954. They gave her a year off to rest in 1955. Then, in 1956 she and Welch won the title again. The mare won a career total of $35,000, which would be significant earnings when adjusted for higher purses awarded now. Welch called her the smartest and best cutting horse he ever rode. The mare died when she was 9 years old and never produced any foals.

In 1960, Welch trained a horse named Jessie Jack owned by C.E. Boyd, Jr. of Houston, Texas; he rode the horse to win the NCHA World Champion Stallion title.

In 1962, Welch and other competitors started the NCHA Futurity. The NCHA Futurity is an event for 3-year-old horses who have not been shown before. In 1962, the NCHA Futurity held its first event at the Nolan County Coliseum in Sweetwater, Texas. Welch rode Money Glo, owned by C.E. Boyd, III, in the event. The duo marked 224 to win, earned $3,838.12, and the status of having won the first event. Money Glo's sire, King Glo, owned by C.E. Boyd, Jr. brought his owner a $1,000 Breeders Award.

From 1962 to 1963, Welch served on the NCHA's Executive Committee; he also served as an NCHA director.

In 1963, Welch marked 218 on Chickasha Glo in the NCHA Futurity for a second straight win. They won $4,277, which was a new record for a cutting horse. Chickasha Glo was also sired by King Glo, and Boyd earned a second consecutive $1,000 Breeders Award. In 1964, he placed fifth riding Glo Doc.

By November 1965, Money Glo had a new owner, Repps Guitar. Repps Guitar had Welch take Money Glo to the NCHA Finals in Las Vegas, Nevada. There were at least 77 horses competing for the championship. Welch won the first round, tied for third place in the second round, and tied for fourth place in the average. Welch returned home after the championship ended and decided to open his own cutting horse school, which attracted students from across the US and as far away as Australia. At the time, Welch was living in the Ranch, right outside of Roscoe, Texas. He was also leasing two ranches, the former C.E. Boyd, Jr. Ranch and the L.S. Howard Ranch. He was operating and managing three ranches, managing and showing horses, and running a cutting school.

In 1966, Welch marked 218 points on Rey Jay's Pete in the fifth NCHA Futurity in his third win of the event. The event now showcased 336 horses compared to the 47 that had been nominated in the inaugural event. The purse was now nearly four times its original amount. The horse, Rey Jay's Pete was sired by Rey Jay. He was unregistered and owned by Kenneth Peters of Fort Wayne, Indiana. "Rey Jay's Pete was an outstanding horse, really a true cow horse," Welch said. They won the race by two points Waddy Wolf and Leroy Ashcraft. Welch broke the winnings record again with $9,353.

In 1971, Welch rode Dry Doc for a record fourth win in the NCHA Futurity. Dry Doc was a full brother to the previous champion, Doc O'Lena, and was by Doc Bar out of Poco Lena. He was bred by Dr. & Mrs. Stephen Jensen. "Dry Doc was a little athlete and could really run, stop, get back and hold a cow", Welch said. The NCHA was now ten years old. The purse had grown from $18,375 to $112,000.

In 1974, Welch rode the American Quarter Horse Hall of Fame horse cutting horse Mr San Peppy for the King Ranch to an NCHA World Championship. In 1976 Welch again rode him to another NCHA World Championship. In 1976, Welch rode Mr San Peppy in senior cutting to win an AQHA World Championship.

In 1977, Welch rode Peppy San Badger for a record fifth win in the NCHA Futurity. Peppy San Badger was bred by Joe Kirk Fulton and owned by the King Ranch. Nicknamed "Little Peppy" the horsed marked 220.5 under a new scoring system. "Little Peppy could be a real classy, pretty horse with lots and lots of style, and then he could immediately turn into a fierce working horse and hold bad, bad cows", said Welch. The pair also won the 1978 NCHA Derby, the 1980 reserve World Championship and the 1981 NCHA World Finals. Peppy San Badger in the American Quarter Horse Hall of Fame, his offspring earned more than $21 million, and he's ranked in the top 5 sires.

Dry Doc, Little Peppy, Peppy San Badger, and Mr San Peppy were all King Ranch horses that Welch trained and showed. In 1983, the King Ranch purchased Dry Doc. Welch had won the Futurity on Dry Doc and had also beat his son, Greg, who was riding Mr San Peppy.

In 1999, Welch suffered a stroke.

In 2010, Welch focused his attention on the rural population decline in the Ashland, Kansas, Public School District. The shrinking economy in rural towns always seems to force some residents to move away, which causes the number of students to decrease. Wanting to help the students, he and other cutting professionals put on a clinic and raised $13,000 for the District.

In 2011, in Fort Worth, Texas, Welch won the NCHA Futurity Champions Cup, a contest of returning NCHA Futurity winners. He rode Bet Hesa Cat, trained by Austin Shepard and owned by Bet Hesa Cat Syndicate.

== Career summary ==
Welch earned four NCHA World Championship titles (1954, 1956, 1974, 1976), and holds the record for the most NCHA World Championship Futurity titles with five wins (1962, 1963, 1966, 1971, 1977). He received a National Spur Award on September 7, 2012, in Lubbock, TX for his contributions to ranching and livestock industries.

== Honors ==
- 2012 National Golden Spur Award
- 2006 Western Horseman Award
- 2004 American Quarter Horse Hall of Fame
- AQHA's 30 Year Breeder Award
- American Cowboy Culture Working Cowboy Award
- Charles Goodnight Award
- Foy Proctor Memorial Cowman's Award of Honor
- Zane Schulte Trainer of the Year
- Stephenville, Texas, Walk of Fame
- National Cutting Horse Association Hall of Fame
- National Cutting Horse Association Riders Hall of Fame
- Texas Cowboy Hall of Fame

== In popular media ==
Welch appeared as himself in the popular television series Yellowstone in the fifth episode of the fourth season, "Under A Blanket Of Red".
