= Dual Peppy =

Quarter horse stallion

- Breed: Quarter Horse
- Discipline: Cutting
- Sire: Peppy San Badger
- Grandsire: Mr San Peppy
- Dam: Miss Dual Doc
- Maternal grandsire: Docs Remedy
- Sex: Stallion
- Foaled: March 27, 1992 (age 34); Tulare, CA
- Country: United States
- Color: Sorrel
- Breeder: Greg and Laura Ward

Other awards
- 2003 World Champion Lead Sire NRCHA; 1998 Open Champion Congress 5/6 YO Classic Cutting; 1998 Reserve Champion AQHA World Show SR Cutting; 1999 World Champion NCHA Novice horse 1998 Reserve World Champion AQHA Sr. Cutting; NRCHA Superior Cow Horse Award

Dual Peppy was a 1992 sorrel stallion registered with the American Quarter Horse Association (AQHA). He is sired by Peppy San Badger, and out of the mare Miss Dual Doc by Doc's Remedy. Dual Peppy qualified for the AQHA World Show during the 1997-1998 show season, and earned the title "1998 AQHA Reserve World Champion Senior Cutting Horse". In 1998-1999, he competed as a novice horse in National Cutting Horse Association (NCHA) events and earned the title "NCHA World Champion $10,000 Novice Cutting Horse." Dual Peppy, bred by the late Greg Ward, is the second of four full brothers in the Dual Pep line, which also includes Dual Pep, Mister Dual Pep and Dually Pep, all of whom have been successful horses in their own right. Ward broke, trained and showed Dual Peppy until he was sold in January 1998 to Rick and Sherry Brunzell of the Dual Peppy Partnership located in Colorado.

== Dual Pep line of horses ==
Dual Peppy (1992) was bred by the late Greg Ward (1935-1998) of Tulare, California. Ward won the National Reined Cow Horse Association Snaffle Bit Futurity four times, and was inducted into the National Reined Cow Horse Association Hall of Fame. The reined cow horse event requires horse and rider to be proficient in three different disciplines to be competitive: reining, cutting and working cow horse. Ward was known in reined cow horse circles as “The Master”.

Ward's success as a breeder was exemplified by the Dual Pep line of horses which included four full brothers: Dual Pep (1985), Dual Peppy (1992), Mister Dual Pep (1993) and Dually Pep (1995). In 2014, Dual Pep was the fourth leading cutting horse sire with offspring having earned $24,875,554. Ward started breeding Dual Peppy at age 2 and his offspring have earned in excess of $700,000 in various disciplines. Mister Dual Pep's offspring have earned in excess of $1,611,109. Dually Pep is standing at stud in Brazil.

== Dual Peppy Partnership ==
In January 1998, Greg Ward sold Dual Peppy for a reported $650,000 to Rick and Sherry Brunzell of Colorado Springs, Colorado and Jim Babcock of Babcock Ranches in North Texas; they comprised the "Dual Peppy Partnership". They also purchased several top quality broodmares from the late Kay Floyd, NCHA Hall of Fame member and first woman to win two NCHA Futurity championship titles, both being NCHA Non-Pro Champion with the first in 1976 and again in 1987.

Dual Peppy stood at stud at The Babcock Ranch in North Texas for a year and a half. While in their care, Jason Clark furthered Dual Peppy's training, and showed him in AQHA and NCHA cutting events. Clark said, "He was one of those horses you look back on in your career...he’s one of those I’d sure like to have back." Jim Babcock said he was close to Dual Peppy; his office was only 20 ft. from the horse's stall. While Dual Peppy was in his care, Babcock attended every show he was entered in. He referred to the stallion as "a gentle giant" and said, "No matter how many times we asked him to go cut, or how many we went to in a row he was always game for every trip." Babcock left the Dual Peppy Partnership but not on good terms. The Brunzells moved their horses to another location in Texas and eventually moved to Colorado.

== Career ==
Dual Peppy was shown in NCHA sponsored cutting events and NRCHA sponsored reined cow horse events. He won the All American Quarter Horse Congress 5/6 YO Classic Cutting, earned the title of 1998 AQHA Reserve World Champion Senior Cutting Horse, and the 1999 NCHA World Champion $10,000 Novice Cutting Horse. He has earned $88,400 in NCHA earnings. In the National Reined Cow Horse Association (NRCHA), he was awarded a Superior Cow Horse Award after earning $10,000 in NRCHA events.

== Rescue ==
In mid-September 2014, the El Paso County Sheriff's Department in Colorado investigated an animal welfare concern reported by two citizens of Black Forest. They found 10 horses and 4 llamas in poor condition but not emaciated. In the same barn they discovered 14 horse carcasses that "had been treated with lye and covered with tarps to decompose where they fell." The horses belonged to Sherri Brunzell who had leased the barn facility. Dual Peppy, age 22 at the time, was one of the 3 horses found to be in the poorest condition. The horses had feed and water, and were not in immediate danger despite their poor condition; therefore, the sheriff's department followed standard protocol, and gave Brunzell an opportunity to properly tend to the animals and correct the problems. A week or so later, the veterinarian overseeing the follow-up investigation made the determination that nothing had improved and that "the living conditions warranted seizure of the horses and llamas."

The animals were seized and Brunzell was charged with a misdemeanor for animal cruelty. She pleaded not guilty and stated that the dead horses had died from colic over the past year. At her trial in May the following year, Brunzell was found guilty of 8 counts of animal abuse and a month later was sentenced to 60 days in jail and 5 years probation. During that time, she was prohibited from owning or possessing any horses or llamas. The case became known nationally and internationally as “Justice For Dual Peppy.”

== Adoption and sale ==
Dual Peppy was rehabilitated by Blue Rose Ranch, Inc. a horse rescuer. In 2016, after his first adoptive home was unsuccessful, he was sold to Jim Babcock. After 2016, Dual Peppy's whereabouts are unclear.

== Pedigree ==
Leo
Leo San
San Sue Darks
Mr San Peppy
Pep Up
Peppy Belle
Belle Burnett
Peppy San Badger
Grey Badger II
Grey Badger III
Mary Greenock
Sugar Badger
Lucky Jim
Sugar Townley
R J Clark Mare
Dual Peppy
Lightning Bar
Doc Bar
Dandy Doll
Doc's Remedy
Poco Tivio
Teresa Tivio
Saylors Little Sue
Miss Dual Doc
Lightning Bar
Doc Bar
Dandy Doll
Miss Brooks Bar
Cannon Ball St John
ST Marys Dream
Brindle
