= Reliant Center =

Convention center in Houston, Texas

Coordinates: 29.68768°N 95.406325°W

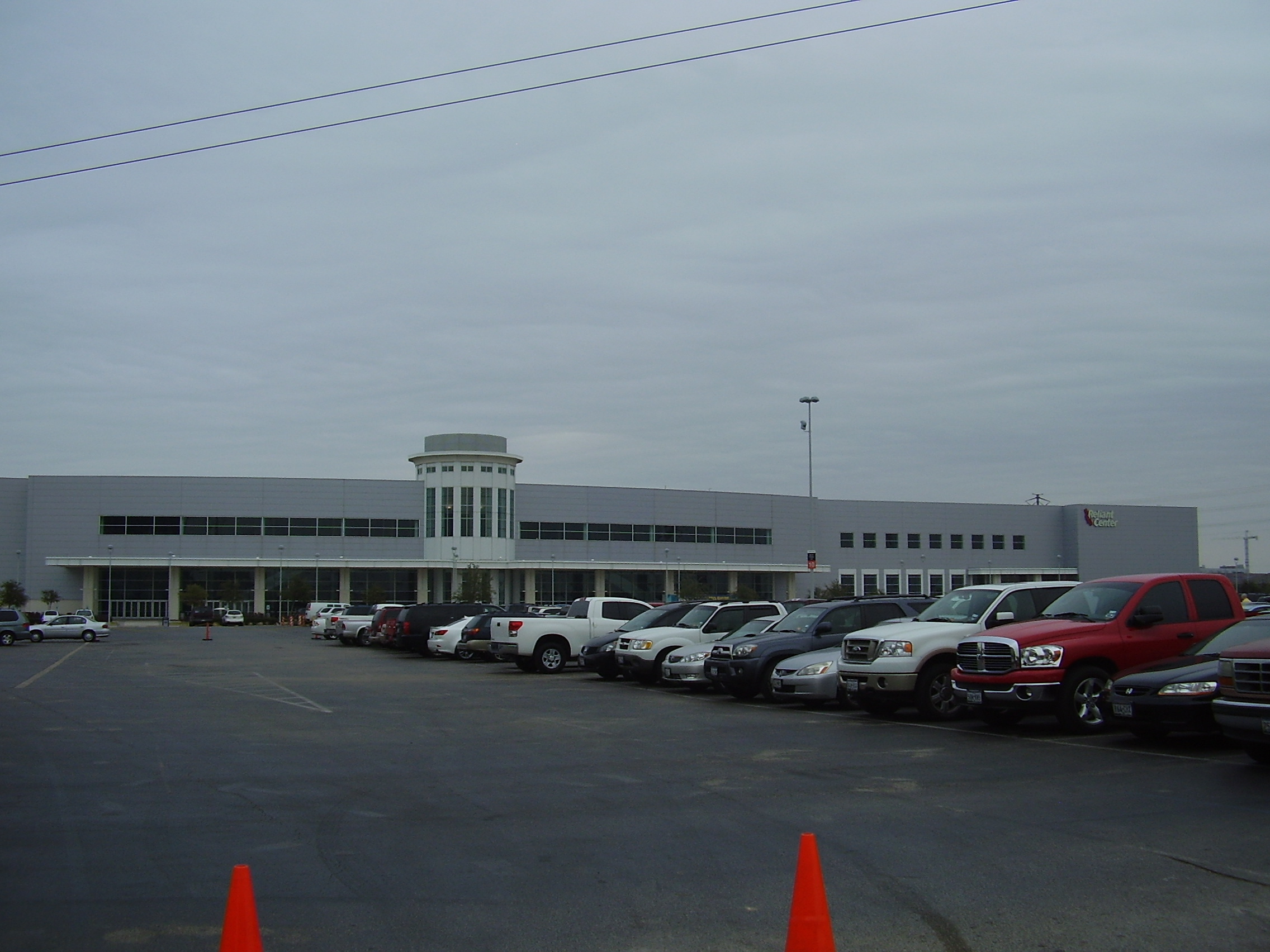
Reliant Center

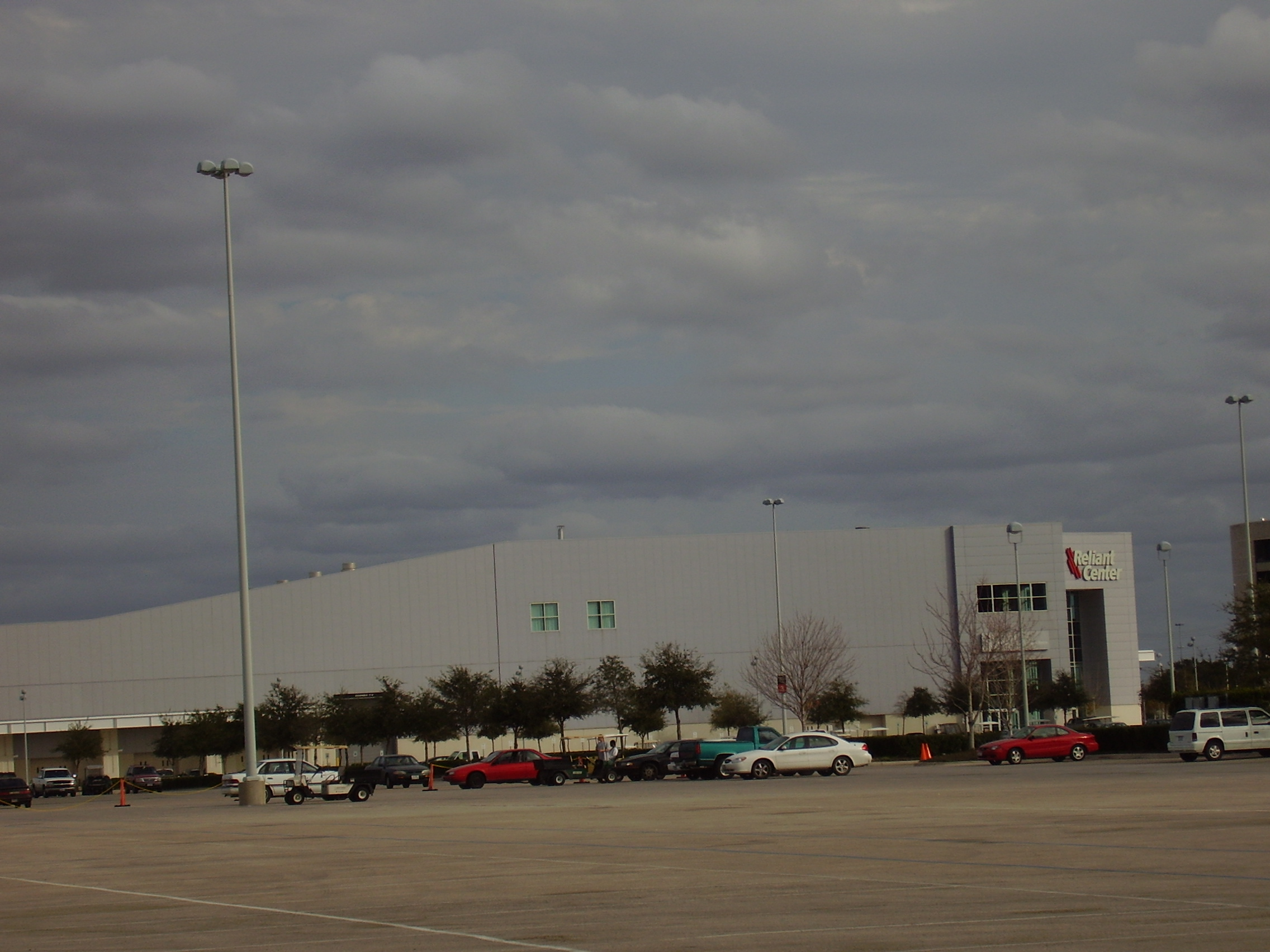
Reliant Center

The Reliant Center (former name NRG Center) is a convention center in Houston, Texas, and the eighth largest convention center in the United States. It is part of the NRG Park complex that was constructed around the Reliant Astrodome and Reliant Stadium. The Reliant Center hosts various events year-round, including portions of the Houston Livestock Show and Rodeo, which maintains its offices on the second floor of the building. The grand opening of the facility was on April 12, 2002, with the Houston Auto Show. Hermes Reed Architects was the architect for the facility.

On March 12, 2014, the Reliant Center was renamed to the NRG Center. In August 2026, the name was reverted back to the Reliant Center.

== The facility ==
The convention floor runs over 0.25 miles (400 m) in length, while total building size is 1,532 feet (467 m) long and 590 feet (180 m) wide, with a total area of 1,400,000 square feet (130,000 m^{2}). The facility features over 706,000 square feet (65,600 m^{2}) of contiguous single-level exhibition space, which is divisible into 11 separate halls, ranging in size from 40,000 to 168,000 square feet (3,700 to 15,600 m^{2}).

The 61 meeting rooms are configurable into over 100 variations, and the two largest meeting rooms are 17,000 and 22,000 square feet (1,600 and 2,000 m^{2}). Each meeting room has its own dedicated sound, lighting and networking capabilities.

There are also 118 loading bays, a 280,000-square-foot (26,000 m^{2}) marshalling area with over 200,000 square feet (19,000 m^{2}) for shuttle transportation, and over 150,000 square feet (14,000 m^{2}) of registration space. The facility the technological infrastructure capable of providing high-speed internet access, pre-wired fiber optic cabling backbone, on-site production facilities, 120 television monitors, as well as web-casting abilities.

== Uses ==
Along with the Houston Livestock Show and Rodeo, Reliant Center hosts some of the largest conventions and trade shows in Houston. Some examples of these events are the Offshore Technology Conference, The Reliant Park World Series of Dog Shows, Nutcracker Market, Houston Auto Show, International Gem & Jewelry Show, The Vans Warped Tour, Houston Gun Collector's and Antique Show, and the Houston Boat, Sport, and Travel Show, to name a few.

In September 2005, the center hosted several thousand refugees from Hurricane Katrina when the Astrodome was declared full.

Reliant Center hosted World Wrestling Entertainment's WrestleMania Axxess event from April 2 to April 5, in 2009, where fans met their favorite wrestlers in the buildup to WrestleMania XXV at the Reliant Stadium on April 5.

On 30 August 2017, the NRG Center again became a relief shelter in the aftermath of Hurricane Harvey, after the George R. Brown Convention Center went over capacity.

== OTC ==
From 2003, the Offshore Technology Conference is held at the Reliant Center. The OTC is a large event in the technology of offshore exploration and production of energy resources and associated environmental protection, with attendance in tens of thousands attendees.
