= Carruth Plaza =

Sculpture garden in Houston, Texas, US

Coordinates: 29.6860°N 95.4089°W

- Interactive map of Carruth Plaza
- Type: Sculpture garden
- Location: Houston, Texas, United States

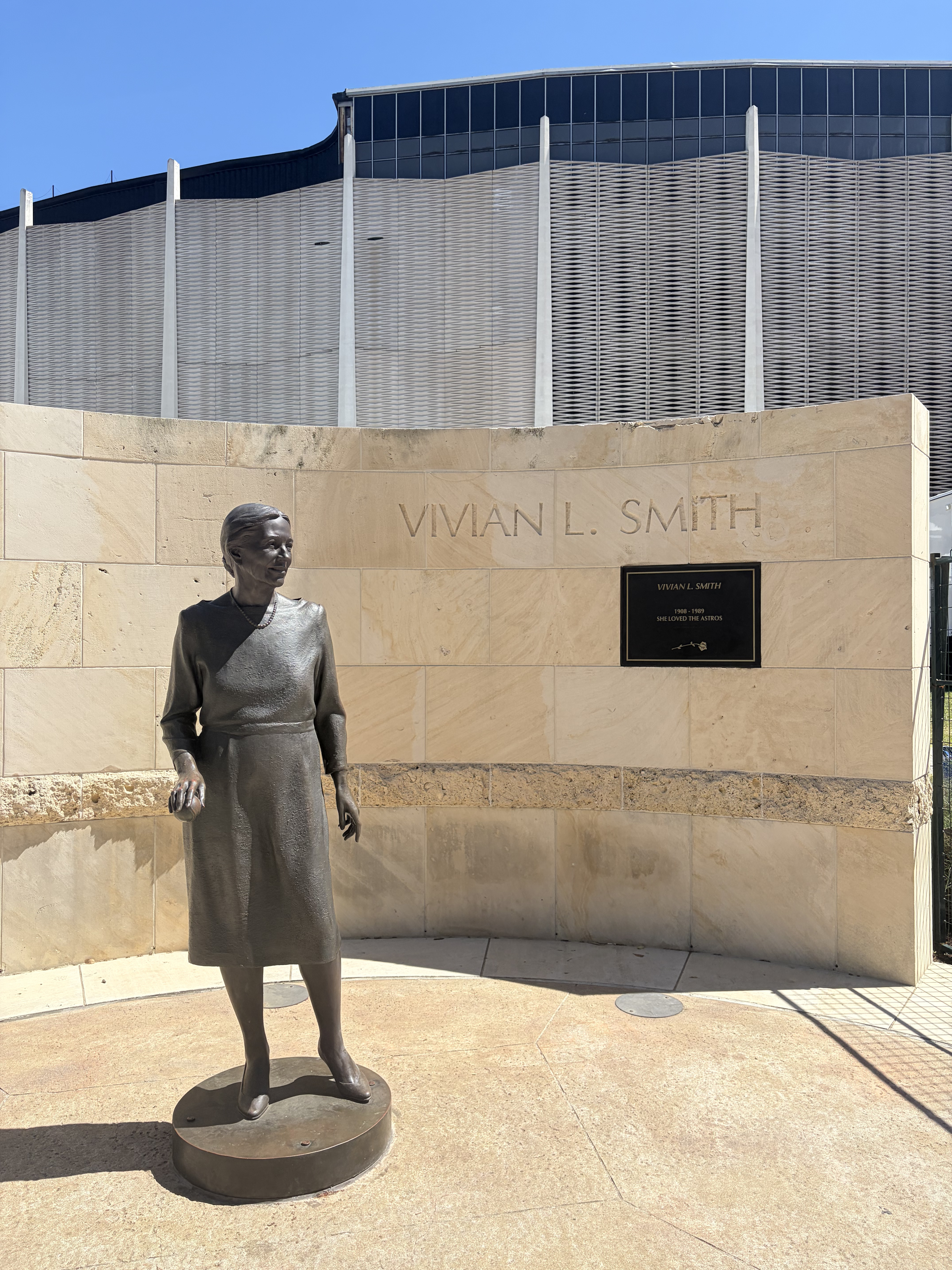
Vivian L. Smith Statue, Carruth Plaza, Houston.

Carruth Plaza is a Western sculpture garden in Houston, Texas. It is part of NRG Park. Completed in 2003, the plaza was named after Allen H. "Buddy" Carruth, former chairman of the Houston Livestock Show and Rodeo.
