= Jim Reno =

American sculptor

- Born: March 14, 1929; Wheeling, W. VA.
- Died: November 1, 2008 (aged 79); Kerrville, TX
- Resting place: Glen Rest Cemetery; Kerrville, TX
- Education: John Herron School of Art
- Known for: Sculptures of horses and horsemen
- Notable work: life-size bronze of Secretariat, Kentucky Horse Park in Lexington; bronze of Dash For Cash, entrance to the American Quarter Horse Association Museum, Amarillo, TX.
- Spouse: Mary Jo Schrock
- Children: 3
- Parents: Raymond Reno (father); Mary Ann McAlinden Reno (mother)
- Awards: NCHA Members Hall of Fame (1990)
- Elected: NCHA President (7 years), NCHA Executive Board (21 years)

Jim Reno (1929–2008) was a bronze sculptor who focused his artistic abilities on western themes and famous horses, such as Secretariat. Reno's most notable sculpture is titled Secretariat—31 Lengths which is on display at the National Museum of Racing at Saratoga Springs, New York. He was also commissioned in 1973 by Secretariat's owner Penny Chenery (Tweedy) to sculpt a life-size bronze of the horse for the Kentucky Horse Park in Lexington, Kentucky. Reno also sculpted Dash For Cash, cattleman Charles Goodnight, Comanche Indian Chief Quannah Parker, and many other depictions of legendary people and horses.

Reno raised and trained cutting horses, and competed in NCHA cutting horse events. He served two terms as president of the NCHA, served twenty-one years on the NCHA executive committee, and was inducted into the NCHA Members Hall of Fame.

== Early life ==
Reno grew up in New Castle, Indiana in a single parent home. When Jim was only five, his father deserted the family, forcing his mother to work in an auto factory to support her two boys. At age 7, Reno got a job mucking stalls at the county fairgrounds, which is when he first developed an affinity for horses. As a teenager, Reno's life was already taking shape with the support of school teachers who took an interest in him, including one teacher who recognized his artistic talent as a sculptor. Reno took a woodcarving class in high school, and carved a Hereford cow that he contributed to his agriculture class so his classmates could use it as a model to learn how to judge beef cattle. That woodcarving inspired his teacher to enter it in the state competition, which Jim ended up winning. That same teacher helped him get a scholarship to the Herron School of Art and Design in Indianapolis. After graduating from high school, he attended the John Herron School of Art on a six-week trial scholarship which developed into a full scholarship. He received his degree in 1952, and headed west for a job interview with The Walt Disney Company in California, but because of his strong desire to be in Texas, he ended-up in Houston instead. Sculpting opportunities were few, so he started training horses, and did some sculpting on the side.

== Cutting horses ==
Reno was an owner, trainer and breeder of cutting horses for about 30 years; he retired in 1995. He and his wife, Mary Jo, owned the cutting horse stallion Shorty Lena by Doc O'Lena and out of Moira Girl. The first winning cutting horse Reno trained was an Arabian mare named "Madida". She earned the title Horse of the Year for the Gulf Coast Cutting Horse Association. Reno earned a total of $94,037.34 in lifetime earnings in the NCHA.

In high school, I always was drawing horses. I wasn’t drawing horses because I wanted to. I was drawing horses because I wanted to be with them and wanted to be outside. ~Jim Reno

In 1975, he was elected to serve on the Executive Committee of the National Cutting Horse Association as vice-president, and then served as president for a total of seven years, his first term from 1976-78 and again from 1986-89. He was inducted into the NCHA Members Hall of Fame in 1990.

== Sculptures ==
His work as a sculptor is wide-ranging, and can be seen in collections of individuals, businesses, the White House permanent collection, and museums around the world. Among his most notable sculptures is the life-size statue of Secretariat, the Triple Crown winner affectionately known as "Big Red". The statue is located at the Maker’s Mark Secretariat Center in the Kentucky Horse Park in Lexington.

I'm a horseman. I needed a ranch to raise horses. My art let me have the ranch. ~ Jim Reno

Reno also sculptured the life-size bronze statue of the race horse Dash For Cash, an American Quarter Horse trained by Bubba Cascio, and ridden by jockey Jerry Nicodemus. The memorial was inspired by a photograph of Nicodemus astride the horse after winning the 1976 Champion of Champions race at Los Alamitos Race Course. The AQHA considers it "the sport's richest and most prestigious race for older horses." The statue is located in front of the American Quarter Horse Hall of Fame & Museum. The ashes of Dash for Cash are buried at the foot of the statue.

Among his many accolades, Reno was named Texas Artist of the Year (1997–1998) by the Texas State Art Commission.
