= NCHA Members Hall of Fame =

NCHA Members Hall of Fame was established in 1977 by the National Cutting Horse Association (NCHA) to honor those members who have demonstrated "through their own efforts and those of the horses they raise" over a period time, their dedication to the sport of cutting, as well as their outstanding and unusual contributions to the NCHA's basic mission in promoting the sport of cutting. In addition to their Member's Hall of Fame, the NCHA established the following: Non-Pro Hall of Fame, NCHA Rider Hall of Fame, NCHA Horse Hall of Fame, Youth Hall of Fame and Horse of the Year.

== Hall of Fame honorees ==
- Dave Batty, Coldstream BC, Canada
- Chris Benedict, Weatherford, TX
- Ernie Beutenmiller, Sr, Union, MO
- Bobby Brown, Collierville, TN
- E.C. Bryant, Jr., Weatherford, TX
- Lindy Burch, Weatherford, TX
- Don Bussey, Guin, AL
- Punk Carter, Celina, TX
- Bette Cogdell, Tulia, TX
- Carolyn Crist, Fort Worth, TX
- Paul Crumpler, Wichita Falls, TX
- Dennie Dunn, Salt Lake City, UT
- James Eakin, Hondo, TX
- Jo Ellard, Dallas, TX
- Ben Emison, Weatherford, TX
- Jonathan Foote, Livingston, MT
- Dick Gaines, Byers, TX
- Kenneth Galyean, Bentonville, AR
- Lee Garner, Batesville, MS
- Helen K. Groves, Baird, TX
- Leroy Hamann, Belleville, IL
- Rufus Hayes, Milton, FL
- Walter Hellyer, Canada
- Edley Hixson, Jr., DeRidder, LA
- Wayne Hodges, Weatherford, TX
- James Hooper, Decatur, AL
- Pat Jacobs, Burleson, TX
- Lisa Johnson, Clayton, NC
- Bob Joy, Cresson, TX
- Mike Kelly, Mansfield, TX
- Tom Lyons, Grandview, TX
- David McGregor, Santa Ynez, CA
- Tom McGuane, McLeod, MT
- Jim Milner, Southlake, TX
- Mary Jo Milner, Southlake, TX
- Tommy Moore, Aledo, TX
- W.S. "Billy" Morris, III., Augusta, GA
- Murlene Mowery, Millsap, TX
- Don Neuenschwander, Houston, TX
- Jimmy Orrell, Monticello, AR
- Harland Radomske, Weatherford, TX
- Bill Riddle, Ringling, OK
- Terry Riddle, Wynnewood, OK
- Dave Robson, Calgary, AB
- Mel Shearin, Villa Ridge, MO
- Sam Shepard, Verbena, AL
- Ray Smith, Mantachie, MS
- Don Strain, White River, SD
- Terry Strange, Houston, TX
- Mance Stark, Merryville, LA
- George Stout, Santa Ynez, CA
- Chubby Turner, Weatherford, TX
- Buster Welch, Rotan, TX
- Mike Wells, Houston, TX

== Deceased honorees ==
- S.J. Agnew
- Judy Burton Armstrong
- Beamon Ashley
- Dorris Letcher Ballew
- Emry Birdwell
- Grady Blue
- Gayle Borland
- Edd Bottom
- Norman Bruce
- Robert "Bob" Burton
- Stanley Bush
- H. Calhoun
- Jim Calhoun
- Don Carr
- John Carter
- Billy Cogdell
- Bill Collins
- Bobby Cook
- S.J. "Red" Cook
- J.D. Craft
- Willard Davis
- Chester Dennis
- Don Dodge
- Pat Earnheart
- Dan Evans
- Marion Flynt
- J.M. "Shorty" Freeman
- J.M. Frost, III.
- George Glascock
- Don Gould
- Harry J. Guffee
- Ike Hamilton
- Mary Harbinson Hensley
- Volney Hildreth
- C.P. Honeycutt
- Cletus Hulling
- Kenneth Jackson
- James Kenney
- Harold Knox, Sr.
- R. C. "Dick" Martin
- Byron Matthews
- Jack Mehrens
- Art Miller
- Douglas B. Mitchell
- Roger Odum
- L.M. "Pat" Patterson
- Albert H. Paxton
- Louis Pearce Jr.
- Jimmy Randals
- Jim Reno
- Matlock Rose
- Tom B. Saunders
- Fern Sawyer
- Modine Smith
- Don Taylor
- Dr. Lamar Thaggard
- Larry Townsend
- Ray Smyth
- Greg Welch
- Dale Wilkinson
- Philip Williams
- Sam Wilson
- Zack T. Wood Jr.
- W.H. (Dub) Worrell
