= Dual Pep =

Quarter Horse stallion

Dual Pep (1985–2018) was a dark chestnut stallion registered with the American Quarter Horse Association (AQHA).

Dual Pep was sired by Peppy San Badger out of Miss Dual Doc, by Doc's Remedy. Dual Pep competed in National Cutting Horse Association (NCHA) events having earned $302,053.60 in lifetime NCHA earnings. At the time of his death, Dual Pep's offspring have earned over $24 million, making him fifth on the list of all-time leading sires.

Dual Pep is the sire of Dual Rey (1994-2018), also a leading cutting horse sire whose offspring have earned over $36 million.
