= Peppy San Badger =

Quarter Horse show horse and sire

- Breed: American Quarter Horse
- Discipline: Cutting
- Sire: Mr San Peppy
- Grandsire: Leo San
- Dam: Sugar Badger
- Maternal grandsire: Grey Badger III
- Sex: Stallion
- Foaled: 1974
- Died: July 8, 2005 (aged 30–31)
- Country: United States
- Color: Sorrel
- Breeder: Joe Kirk Fulton
- Owner: King Ranch

Other awards
- 1977 National Cutting Horse Association (NCHA) Futurity Champion; 1978 NCHA Derby Champion; 1980 NCHA Reserve World Champion

Honors
- American Quarter Horse Hall of Fame
- Last updated on: April 2, 2014.

Peppy San Badger (1974–2005) was an American Quarter Horse stallion who won the National Cutting Horse Association (or NCHA) Futurity in 1977 and the NCHA Derby in 1978. He was inducted into the American Quarter Horse Association's (or AQHA) Hall of Fame in 2008.

== Life and show career ==
Peppy San Badger, foaled in 1974 and also known as “Little Peppy”, was a sorrel American Quarter Horse stallion bred by Joe Kirk Fulton of Lubbock, Texas, by the cutting sire Mr San Peppy and out of Sugar Badger, a daughter of Grey Badger III. He was born at Fulton's ranch and began early basic training there before he became ill with strangles. Upon recovering from the illness, Peppy San Badger was sold to the King Ranch of South Texas in 1977, where he remained a breeding stallion until his death.

Peppy San Badger was trained by trainer and rider Buster Welch, the same trainer who had ridden his sire, Mr San Peppy, to the win in both the 1974 and 1976 NCHA Open World Championships. Peppy San Badger won the NCHA 1977 Futurity with Welch as rider. Shortly after the Futurity, Welch bought “Little Peppy” after the King Ranch decided they did not need him as a junior stallion because they already owned his sire Mr San Peppy. Welch owned him for a year before agreeing to sell him back to King Ranch to become a part of their breeding program. Peppy San Badger, with Welch riding again, won the NCHA Derby in 1978 and reached 10th place in that year's year-end standings.

Peppy San Badger's success continued into the 1980s, being named the 1980 NCHA Reserve World Champion. He was also inducted into NCHA Hall of Fame in December of that year. In 1981, he won the Open Division of the NCHA finals and accumulated $172,710 in earnings over the course of his showing career. Peppy San Badger was inducted into the AQHA Hall of Fame in 2008.

== Career as a sire ==
Peppy San Badger's career as a sire had a large impact on the Quarter Horse breed. He was the all-time leading sire of the NCHA for many years up until 2003. Peppy San Badger sired 2,325 foals registered with the AQHA in 19 seasons. Those foals have earned over 7,200 points in all divisions and have accumulated more than $25 million in earnings.

Some of his notable offspring include: Dual Peppy, Dual Pep, Lil Ruf Peppy, who was the National Reining Horse Association’s (or NRHA) ninth $3 million sire, Vintage Little Taris, inducted into the NRHA Hall of Fame in 2008, and Little Tenina, who won the NCHA Futurity in 1991.

== Death ==
Peppy San Badger was euthanized on July 8, 2005, at the age of 31 as a result of his failing health due to his old age. He was buried at King Ranch Headquarters in Texas.

== Pedigree ==
Joe Reed II
Leo
Little Fanny
Leo San
San Siemon
San Sue Darks
Little Sue
Mr San Peppy
Macanudo
Pep-Up
Petra R2
Peppy Belle
Gold Rush
Belle Burnett
Triangle Lady 9
Peppy San Badger
Midnight Jr
Grey Badger II
Grey Annie
Grey Badger III
Greenock (TB)
Mary Greenock (TB)
That's Mine (TB)
Sugar Badger
Redwood
Lucky Jim
Little Mother
Sugar Townley
unknown
R. J. Clark mare
unknown
