= Houston Livestock Show and Rodeo =

Livestock exhibition in Houston, Texas, US

Coordinates: 29°41′5″N 95°24′39″W

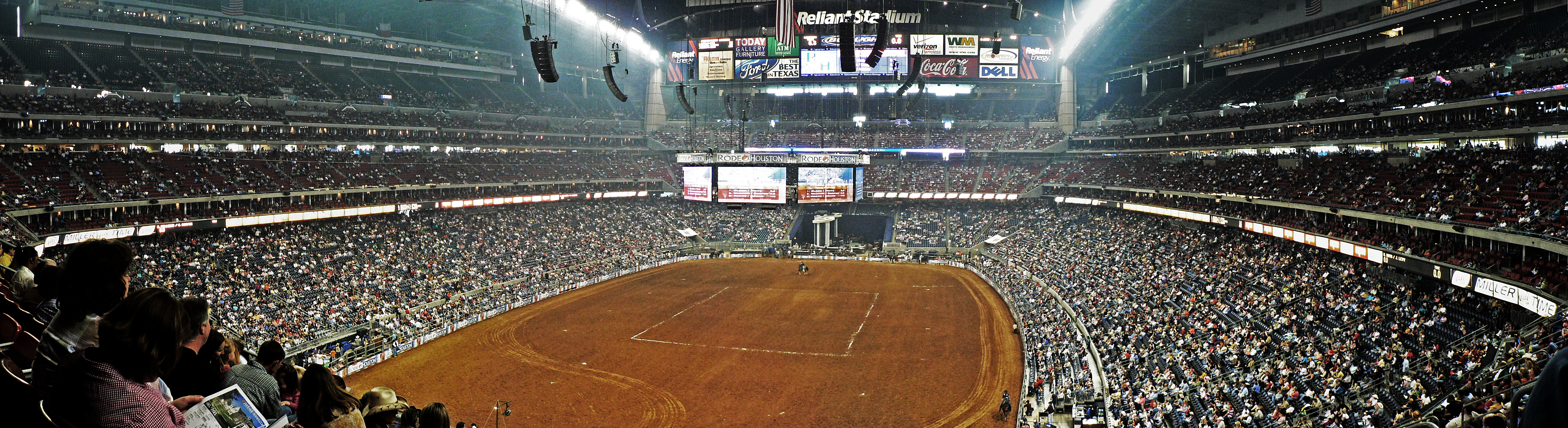
- Reliant Stadium filled with rodeo attendees at the 2006 HLSR
- Genre: Rodeo, livestock show and fair
- Dates: 2–21 March 2027
- Venue: Reliant Stadium
- Locations: Houston, Texas, United States
- Founded: 1931 (as the Houston Fat Stock Show)
- Attendance: 2.7 million (2025)
- Website: rodeohouston.com

The Houston Livestock Show and Rodeo is the largest livestock exhibition and rodeo in the world. It was originally created to promote livestock production and agriculture in Texas, providing a space for farmers and ranchers to showcase their work. Over time, the event has grown from a small regional exhibition into one of the largest cultural and economic events in the United States. It includes the richest regular-season professional rodeo. It has been held at Reliant Stadium in Houston, Texas, since 2003, with the exception of 2021 due to the effects of the COVID-19 pandemic. It was previously held at the Astrodome.

In 2007, the rodeo was deemed "the year of the volunteer." In 2017, attendance reached a record high of 2,611,176 people and 33,000 volunteers. In 2025, a new attendance record was set with 2,735,695 people. The event is 20 days long. It is kicked off by the Downtown Rodeo Roundup held near Houston City Hall, the Downtown Rodeo parade, and the ConocoPhillips Rodeo Run – a 10k and 5k walk & run and the World's Championship Bar-B-Que Contest. Today, the rodeo represents a combination of agriculture, entertainment, and education, attracting millions of visitors annually and playing a major role in preserving Texas Western heritage. The show features championship rodeo action, livestock competitions, concerts, a carnival, pig racing, barbecue and the Rodeo Uncorked! International Wine Competition, shopping, sales and livestock auctions. Traditional trail rides, which start in different areas of Texas and end in Houston, precede the Rodeo events. The City of Houston celebrates this event with Go Texan Day, where residents are encouraged to dress in western wear the Friday before the rodeo begins.

== History ==
=== Early years ===
In the early part of the 20th century, Houston-area ranchers developed a new breed of cattle, the American Brahman, which was a blend of four breeds of cattle from India. The cattle were well-adapted to the hot, swampy conditions of the Texas Gulf Coast. In the early 1920s, James W. Sartwelle, a stockyard manager from Sealy, Texas, founded the American Brahman Breeders Association. Ranchers had no opportunities to show their cattle and raise awareness of the breed. Some attempted to show at the Southwestern Exposition and Livestock Show in Fort Worth, Texas, but they weren't allowed into the main arena.

In January 1932, Sartwelle invited six other businessmen to a lunch at the Texas State Hotel. They decided to host a livestock exposition in Houston. Sartwelle was named the first president of the new Houston Fat Stock Show. Their inaugural event was held in late April 1932 at the Democratic Convention Hall in downtown Houston. It was primarily a regional event, designed to showcase the agriculture and livestock, including Brahmans, in the area around Houston. The event was intended to become an annual gathering where farmers and ranchers could promote agricultural practices and build awareness of livestock production in Texas. The show lasted one week and ran a deficit of $2,800. Approximately 2,000 people attended the exposition, where they were also entertained by the Future Farmers Band, comprising 68 high school students from around the state. The Grand Champion Steer was purchased by a local restaurant owner for $504.

The Fat Stock Show was held annually for the next four years. Realizing they had outgrown the space, organizers began looking for a larger venue. Shortly after the 1936 show ended, Sam Houston Hall was torn down. Sam Houston Coliseum, a 10,000-seat arena, would take its place. To allow for construction time, the 1937 exposition was cancelled. The year off allowed Fat Stock show organizers to solidify plans for a larger event. When the show resumed in 1938, it included a parade through downtown Houston, a carnival and midway, and a rodeo with a total purse of $640.50.

In the 1940s, despite World War II, organizers added musical entertainment. Local talent was invited to perform after the rodeo on some evenings. In 1942, singing cowboy Gene Autry became the first nationally recognized entertainer to perform at the show.

Attendance flagged in the early 1950s. To attract more attention to the event, organizers decided to hold a cattle drive. In 1952, the media were invited to join cowboys on a 75 miles (121 km) trek from Brenham, Texas to the Fat Stock Show. The publicity stunt was well received. The following year, the Salt Grass Trail Association again held the cattle drive. Other areas of the state organized their own trail rides to the show. This began the transition from a smaller regional event to larger, statewide notice.

Archer Romero, one of the key proponents of the trail ride, took over as president of the Fat Stock Show in 1954. That year, he founded the Go Texan Committee to further publicize the show. The committee would designate a day shortly before the show commenced as Go Texan Day. They encouraged Houston residents to dress in Western wear. The day had the dual purpose of celebrating Texas culture and advertising the show.

In 1957, Myrtis Dightman organized the first trail ride for African-Americans. He led 10 other cowboys in a ride from Prairie View, Texas to Houston. Because of their color, they were not welcomed in Memorial Park, where trail riders typically spent the night. Armed guards were there to ensure that the men could enter safely.

That same year, the show granted its first major scholarship. Ben Dickerson was given $2,000 ($16,000 in 2016) towards his education. This was the first step a major shift in the show's purpose. Over the next few decades, the show placed an increasing emphasis on education and scholarships.

=== Astrodome era ===
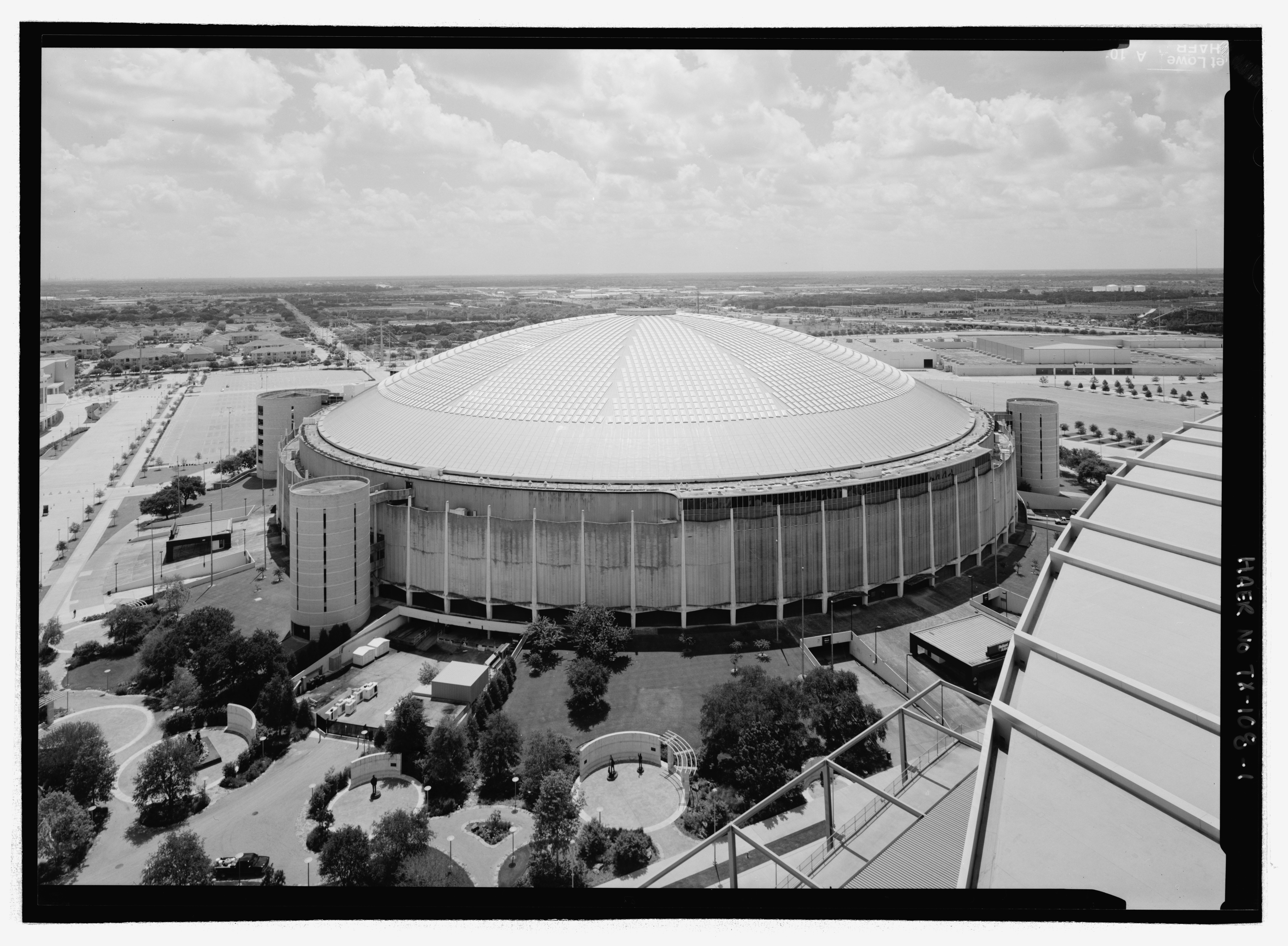
Photo of the Astrodome.

Throughout the 1950s, influential local leaders had been advocating that the city acquire a professional sports team. In 1957, the Texas State Legislature granted Harris County the ability to issue bonds to finance a new stadium, so that the city could attract a team. The county put together a commission to formulate a plan. Romero stepped down as Fat Stock Show president to join the commission. They visited stadiums in several large cities, as well as a fairgrounds in Oklahoma. After several years of research, the commission recommended that the county build both a stadium and a connected, air-conditioned coliseum. The presentation to the county commissioners listed four main uses for the new facility: 1) Major league baseball, 2) football, 3) the Fat Stock Show, and 4) various other activities.

County commissioners approved the project, sending it to a vote of Harris County residents. Just before the election, Fat Stock Show organizers announced that the show would donate 230 acres (93 ha) near South Main for the project, provided the show have input into the design. Voters approved the new stadium, and the Fat Stock Show became one of the focal residents of the new Astrodome.

The show was renamed the Houston Livestock Show and Rodeo in 1961. The show had continued to grow, and organizers realized that Sam Houston Coliseum would not be a viable alternative for much longer. The number of exhibitors had declined because many activities were held outside in tents. The chicken, rabbit, and hog shows were cancelled because organizers could not find space for them. Construction began on the Astrohall, next to the Astrodome, in 1965. The following year, the Livestock Show and Rodeo officially moved to the Astrodome. This move marked a turning point for the event, as the larger, modern venue allowed for increased attendance, expanded performances, and broader national recognition. To mark their new location, the organizing committee introduced a new logo, the Bowlegged H. The first night of the rodeo featured entertainment by the stars of the television series Gunsmoke. Some locals scoffed at the idea that the rodeo and concert could fill a 45,000-seat stadium, but more than 40,000 fans attended the rodeo the night Jimmy Dean performed that year.

Elvis Presley performed at the 1970 show, held in the Astrodome.

Louis Pearce Jr. served sixty years as a board member of the Houston Livestock Show and Rodeo. He served on the executive committee as president and CEO, and remained an active executive committee member until his death in 2012. As a result of his dedication and significant contributions to the event, Pearce became known as "Mr. Houston Livestock Show".

The first Hispanic trail ride commenced in 1973. Calling themselves Los Vaqueros Rio Grande Trail Ride, the group journeyed 400 miles (640 km) from the border crossing at Reynosa, Mexico to Houston.

The Go Texan committee launched the World's Championship Bar-B-Que Contest in 1974. Seventeen teams entered the competition, which was held in the Astrodome parking lot. Teams were asked to barbecue a minimum of 10 pounds (4.5 kg) on a wood fire. The inaugural judges included actor Ben Johnson. The competition grew in popularity; by 1981 it had grown to over 200 teams, with 45,000 people visiting.

In 1988, the show added a 5k run and 10k fun run through downtown Houston. Participants would pay an entry fee, with proceeds going to the scholarship fund.

=== 1990s ===
By the 1990s, the show had been expanded to 20 days. Each evening featured a rodeo, sanctioned by the Professional Rodeo Cowboys Association (PRCA). The rodeo offered hundreds of thousands of dollars in prize money, second only to the National Finals Rodeo. After the rodeo, attendees would see a concert, usually by a famous entertainer. Tickets were sold at around $10 or a little more, a person could buy a ticket to see the livestock shows, wild west shows, the rodeo and concert, and enjoy the carnival. The livestock show was billed as the largest of its kind, with more animals shown by adolescents than anywhere else in the country. Winning livestock were auctioned at the end of the judging, and in the 1990s the combined auction take was over $7 million, beyond market value at the time.

The rodeo was generally limited to the top PRCA contestants, based on prize money earned throughout the year. It was popular with cowboys; Houston won the inaugural Indoor Rodeo Committee of the Year award from the PRCA in 1992 and then won each of the next four years as well. The facility had huge screens hanging from the ceiling. Attendees could watch the competition live, then see an instant replay on the screens.

In 1996, the rodeo was halted one evening. The crew on the space shuttle Columbia appeared live on the big screens to address the crowd. Later that year, country singer George Strait set a record, having played to more than 1 million Houston rodeo attendees. The 1996 rodeo earned a net profit of $16.8 million and gave more than $7.9 million away in scholarships, assistantships, and research grants.

The Hideout was created in 1997 to give attendees more entertainment options after the rodeo and concert had ended. It is a nightclub for adults over 21 to dance and drink.

=== 21st century ===
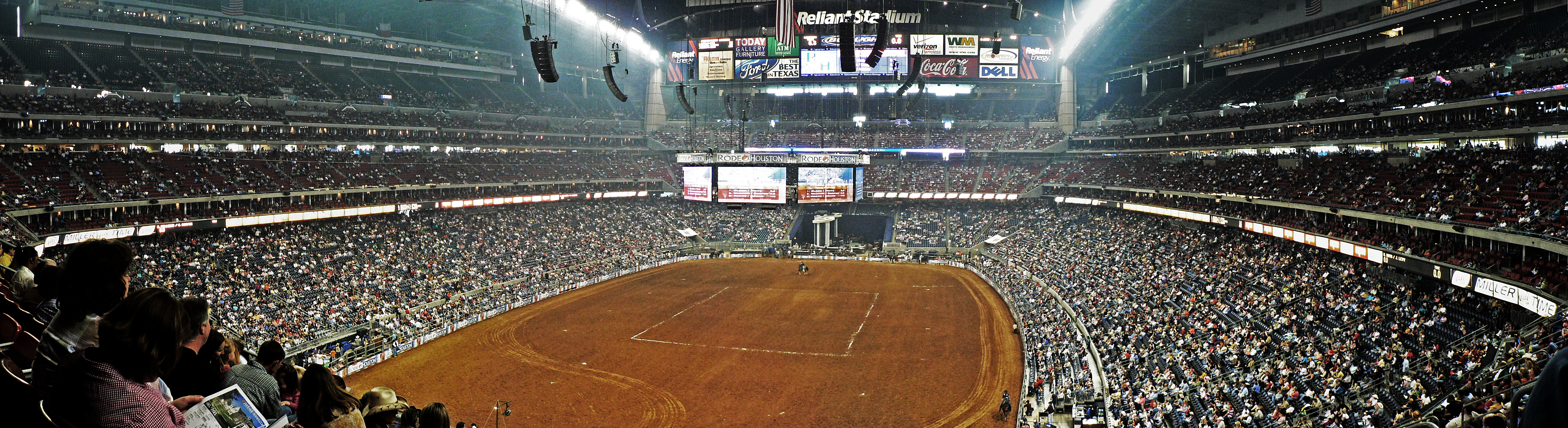
Panoramic view of the Reliant Center used during the Houston Rodeo.

A new venue, Reliant Stadium, opened on the Astrodome grounds in 2002. The rodeo marked its final performance in the Astrodome on March 3, 2002, with George Strait, whose performance was recorded and released as For the Last Time: Live from the Astrodome. The following year, the Houston Livestock Show and Rodeo moved into Reliant Stadium, with Strait performing on opening night. Reliant Center also opened as a new exhibition facility, expanding the organization's space for livestock, educational and commercial exhibits. The stadium and surrounding complex were renamed NRG Stadium and NRG Park in 2014.

In 2004, the organization launched Rodeo Uncorked! International Wine Competition. The program expanded in subsequent years, including the addition of the Wine Garden in 2008.

During the 2000s, the organization began restructuring its rodeo competition in response to declining attendance during the rodeo portion of the nightly program. In 2008, it received a waiver from the Professional Rodeo Cowboys Association to introduce a tournament-style format that allowed organizers to determine when individual competitors would appear and market the competition accordingly. The Houston Livestock Show and Rodeo was inducted into the ProRodeo Hall of Fame that same year.

After its PRCA waiver expired and was not renewed, RODEOHOUSTON became an independent rodeo beginning in 2012. The organization introduced the RodeoHouston Super Shootout, an invitational competition featuring champions from major rodeos in North America. RODEOHOUSTON later returned to PRCA sanctioning, with the Super Series again counting toward competitors' world standings and qualification for the National Finals Rodeo. The Super Shootout was discontinued after 2022. RODEOHOUSTON was named the PRCA Large Indoor Rodeo of the Year in 2019.

The Houston Livestock Show and Rodeo was cut short on March 11, 2020, after eight of its planned 20 days as the COVID-19 pandemic began affecting the Houston area. The 2021 event, initially postponed until May, was later canceled because of the pandemic, marking the first full cancellation of the event since 1937. The Rodeo returned to NRG Park in 2022. Attendance continued to grow following the pandemic. In 2024, the event drew more than 2.5 million visitors, followed by an all-time attendance record of 2,735,695 in 2025.

In 2026, more than 2.6 million people attended the Houston Livestock Show and Rodeo and the preceding World's Championship Bar-B-Que Contest. The season also included record junior auction sales and the induction of nine-time world champion Ty Murray and bucking bull Bodacious into the RODEOHOUSTON Hall of Fame, with Bodacious becoming the first animal athlete inducted.

The 2026 event concluded on March 22 with a special concert-only performance by Cody Johnson, joined by Jon Pardi and Randy Houser. The performance drew 80,203 attendees, setting a new NRG Stadium concert attendance record. Unlike the preceding nights of the event, the March 22 performance did not include a rodeo competition.

== Events ==
=== Rodeo Uncorked! Round Up and Best Bites Competition ===
High scoring wines are served to the public at the Rodeo Uncorked! Roundup and Best Bites Competition before the HLSR begins. There, they can sample food from hundreds of local restaurants and vote on their pick for tastiest food.

During the livestock show, attendees can purchase glasses of these wine entries at the Wine Garden, an outdoor area comprising six tents that shelter 30,000 square feet of space. Live music is offered in the Wine Garden area each evening.

=== Go Texan Day ===
The unofficial kickoff of the Houston Livestock Show and Rodeo is Go Texan Day. Traditionally held the Friday before the rodeo begins, the day is meant to encourage the Houston community to celebrate Western culture. Houston-area residents are encouraged to wear Western attire, such as jeans, cowboy boots, and cowboy hats. The day is an unofficial holiday, and local school districts and many businesses encourage their students and employees to participate. Writing in The New York Times, journalist Manny Fernandez described Go Texan Day as "the one day of the year on which people in Houston dress the way people outside Houston think people in Houston dress".

=== Trail rides ===
From 1952 to 2020 & since 2022, traditional trail rides have been a part of the Houston Livestock Show and Rodeo. The trail rides have grown past 2,000 participants managing over 100 wagons across roughly 1,300 total collective miles.The trail rides range in size from a dozen to over one thousand people who ride on horseback or in horse-drawn wagons from various areas of the state to Houston. They make their way at about 3 miles (4.8 km) per hour, covering up to 17 miles (27 km) each day. Many of the routes take place in part along major highways and busy city streets, making safety a major concern.

The trail rides last from a few days to three weeks, depending on the distance they cover. Some of the participants are able to join only on weekends or at the end of the trip. The days start very early, and often end with live music or a small celebration. Many riders choose to camp in recreational vehicles rather than in the open. Each morning, they drive their vehicles and horse trailers to the next camping spot, then have a bus or convoy take them back so they can retrace their path on horseback. Participants can bring their own provisions, or, in some cases, purchase meals at a chuck wagon that is also following the trail.

The rides converge at Memorial Park in Houston on Go Texan Day, the Friday before the livestock show and rodeo begins. The city closes some roads downtown to allow the riders to reach their destination safely. The resulting traffic interruption cause annual complaints from those who work downtown. The following day, all of the trail riders participate in the parade.

=== Rodeo Parade and Rodeo Run ===
The official kickoff of the show is the annual Rodeo Parade. It is held the Saturday before the show begins and runs through downtown Houston. The parade features members of the 13 trail rides, influential Houstonians, bands, and floats.

Preceding the parade is the annual Houston Livestock Show and Rodeo Run. More than 10,000 people compete annually in 5k and 10k fun runs. All proceeds go to the show's scholarship fund. The run generally begins near Bagby Street and ends at Eleanor Tinsley Park.

When the Rodeo was cancelled in 2021, the fun runs went virtual.

=== World's Championship Bar-B-Que Contest ===
The Thursday, Friday, and Saturday before the livestock show begins, the World's Championship Bar-B-Que Contest, established in 1974, is held on the grounds of Reliant Park. It is one of the largest barbecue cookoffs in the United States, but it is not sanctioned by the Kansas City Barbecue Society. Over 250 teams, including a handful from outside of the United States, compete to be named best entry in several categories, including brisket, chicken, and ribs. The barbecue must be cooked on a wood fire; electric or gas fires are prohibited.

Entries are judged on a 50-point scale, with the most points gained for taste and tenderness, and lesser amounts available for smell and the look and feel of the entry. Winners are named in each category, and then an overall Grand Champion is named. Teams can also compete for non-food-related awards, such as cleanest area, most unique pit, and most colorful team.

Each barbecue team has their own tent on the grounds. Many offer their own entertainment, generally cover bands or DJs. Entrance into each tents is by invitation only. Many teams sell sponsorships that provide access to their tent, with the money often going to charity. Attendees without an invitation to a specific tent can congregate in one of the three general admission areas, each with its own live entertainment. In 2026, the World’s Championship Bar-B-Que Contest entertained 231,304 guests.

=== Rodeo and concert ===
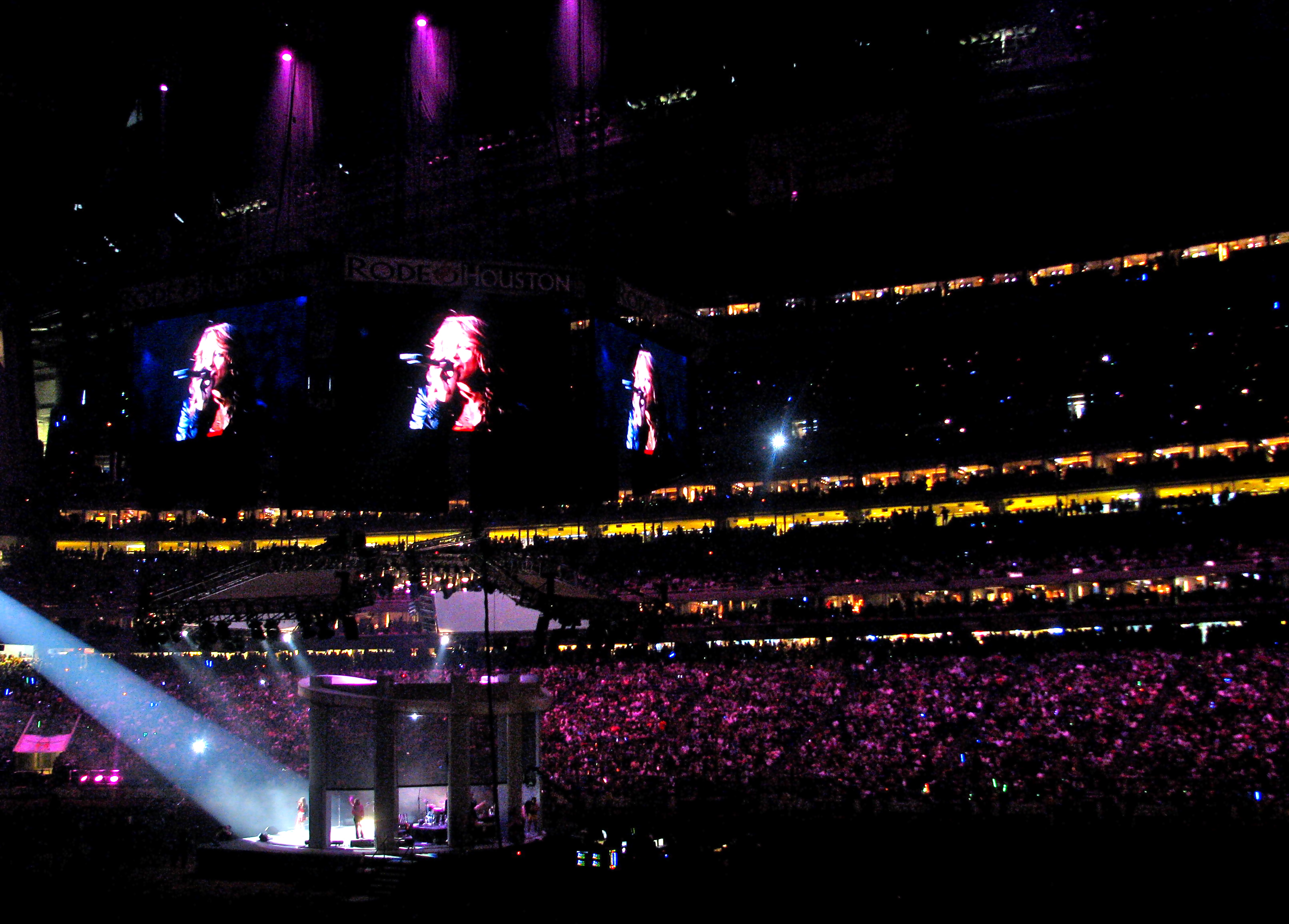
Sold-out concert for Miley Cyrus

One of the largest draws for the Houston Livestock Show and Rodeo is the 21 consecutive evenings of rodeo and concert, held in Reliant Stadium. Tickets are relatively inexpensive, averaging about $35 in 2026, and also grant admission to the livestock show and fairgrounds. More than 47,000 season tickets were sold in 2026, with the remaining seats 23,000 seats available for individual-show sale. Members of the HLSR are given an opportunity to buy individual tickets before the general public.

RodeoHouston is sanctioned by the Professional Rodeo Cowboys Association (PRCA). It is the richest PRCA regular-season rodeo, offering $2.5 million to contestants, which counts for the National Finals Rodeo. RodeoHouston has received the PRCA Large Indoor Rodeo of the Year award a total of ten times (1991-1996, 1998-1999, 2004, and 2019). It features the top professional rodeo cowboys competing in tie-down roping, bareback bronc riding, team roping, saddle bronc riding, steer wrestling, and bull riding. There is also cowgirls competing in breakaway roping and barrel racing, both sanctioned by the Women's Professional Rodeo Association (WPRA). The contestants compete in a playoff format, with the champion in each event earning $65,000, a trophy saddle and belt buckle. For one day, from 2011 through 2019 and again in 2022, contestants competed in the RodeoHouston Super Shootout. Champions from each of the top 10 rodeos in North America, including RodeoHouston, were invited to compete as teams in a subset of rodeo events. In 2020 and since 2022, the entire rodeo has been televised live on The Cowboy Channel.

After the professional rodeo concludes, there are two chuckwagon races in the arena. Sponsored wagons are pulled by a team of six, specially-bred horses steered by cowboys or cowgirls through a figure-eight pattern in Reliant Stadium. Only three chuckwagon teams are allowed to enter the stadium at a time. The lead driver moves his or her team to the outer circle of the arena, allowing the other teams access to the inside lane and a chance to catch up. The teams race at speeds up to 30 miles per hour to try to cross the finish line first.

Texas youth wrestles a calf in attempts to harness it during calf scramble event in Houston Rodeo.

Following the chuckwagon race, children are given an opportunity to compete. Each evening, 30 high school students from across the state compete in the calf scramble. They are given the opportunity to chase down (on foot) and catch one of 15 calves, put a halter on them, and drag them back to the center of the stadium. Winners are given money to purchase their own heifer or steer to show the following year.

Immediately following the calf scramble is mutton busting. Five- and six-year-olds wearing protective gear try to ride a sheep across a portion of the arena. On the last night of the rodeo, the winners from each of the previous evenings compete again to see who will become grand champion.

A rotating stage is then brought into the arena for the nightly concert. The majority of evenings are performances by Country music artists, although some nights are dedicated to Pop, Hip-hop/R&B, and Rock music. The annual Go Tejano Day, which features Regional Mexican artists, generally draws the largest crowds. The winner of the annual Mariachi Invitational competition is invited to perform onstage as the opening act for the Go Tejano Day performers.

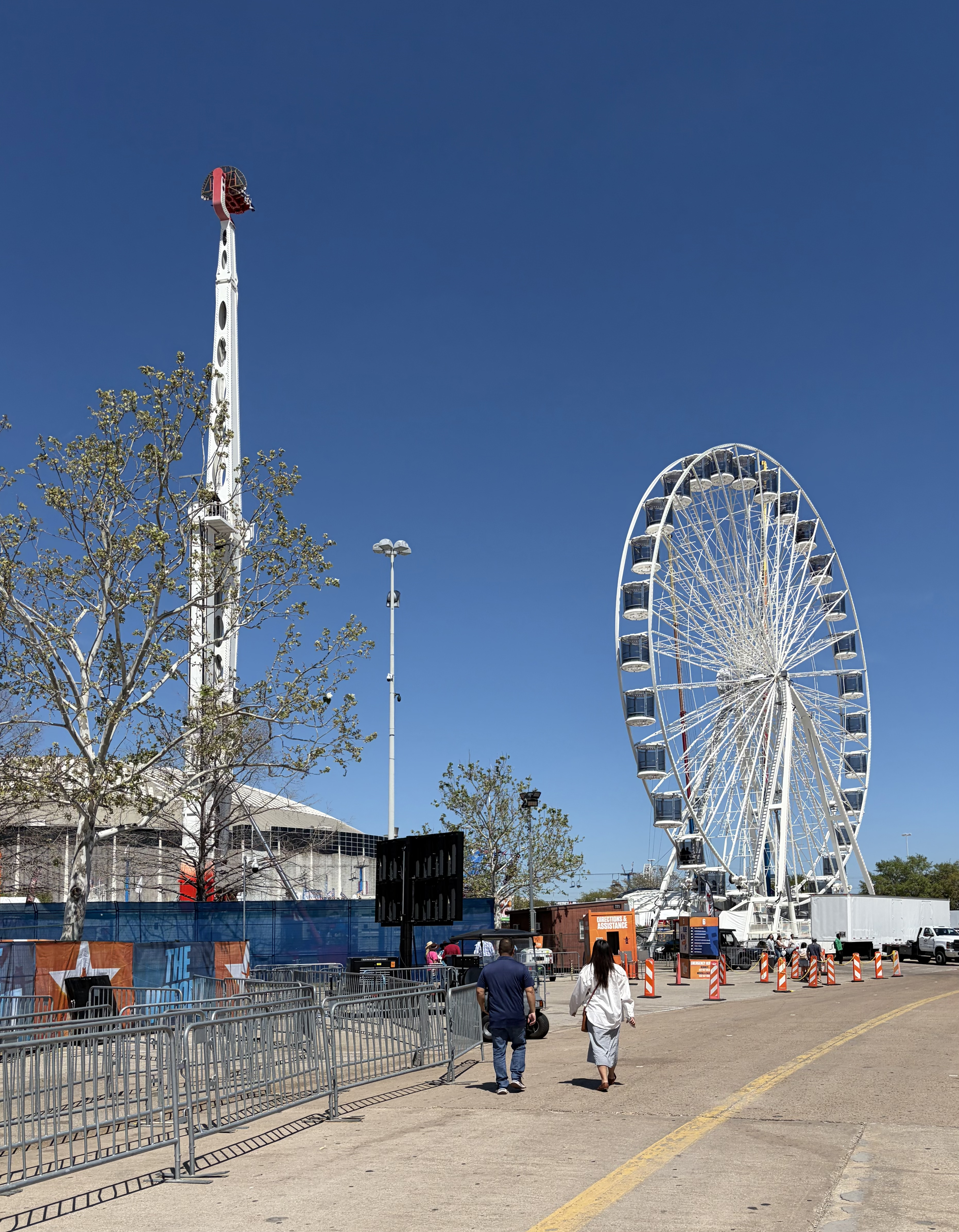
Ferris wheel on HLSR fair grounds.

=== Grounds ===
Visitors who are not attending the rodeo and concert can purchase a lower-cost general admission ticket to gain access to all of Reliant Park except the stadium.

Reliant Center contains AgVenture, which provides educational displays about agriculture and the origins of the food for sale at grocery stores. More than 380,000 students took an official tour at the Rodeo in 2026. Displays include an area where attendees can see cows, pigs, and sheep give birth or see chickens hatch. There are also displays with live rabbits and honeybees. Reliant Center also hosts a large vendor area.

The grounds feature an area where children can do pretend farm chores and compete in races using pedal-driven tractors. There is also a petting zoo, pony and camel rides, and a full carnival and midway.

According to Wesley Sinor, Chairman of the Board, "The Rodeo is a Houston institution, but its impact reaches communities across Texas. The leaders who came before me built something that touches people’s lives in so many ways, from education and agriculture to small businesses and local economies."

Other competitions are held throughout the three weeks at Reliant Center and Reliant Arena. These include open cattle shows and a paint horse competition. Children with mental and physical disabilities are invited to compete in the Lil' Rustlers Rodeo, which offers imitation rodeo events, such as riding a stick horse.

Free educational seminars are available throughout the three weeks of the livestock show. They are open to the public and cover topic related to wildlife, agricultural in general, and farming and hunting.

Adults can visit The Hideout, a temporary dance hall located in a large tent near Reliant Arena. After the show in Reliant Stadium concludes, The Hideout features live music from new artists. Several past performers at The Hideout, including the Dixie Chicks, Blake Shelton, Keith Urban, and the Eli Young Band, later became headliners at the main rodeo show. Approximately 2,000-3,000 people visit The Hideout each evening.

=== Livestock show ===
HLSR is the largest indoor livestock show in the world. For a full week, cattle auctions are held in Reliant Arena for professional breeders to sell their stock. The livestock show has a larger international presence than any other. In 2017, the Ministers of Agriculture from Russia and Colombia made official visits to HLSR, joining more than 2,600 other international businessmen representing 88 countries. The HLSR International Committee estimated that they facilitated more than $2.6 million in agriculture sales between livestock show participants and international visitors in 2016.

Junior market auctions are also held. Children from around the state show the livestock that they have raised, including cattle, market barrow, market goats, market lambs, market broilers, market turkeys and rabbits. These programs provide valuable educational opportunities, allowing young participants to gain experience in agriculture while also competing for scholarships that support their future education. The livestock are judged, with the winners auctioned off. It is the largest set of animals to be shown and judged of any livestock show. Most champion animals sell for well over market value. Winning children are guaranteed a certain amount of scholarship money; if the bid is larger than that amount, the excess funds are directed to the general scholarship fund. The 2026 Livestock and Horse Show competitions drew 38,600 entries, including 33,513 Livestock Show entries and 5,087 Horse Show entries. Junior auction sales totaled a preliminary unaudited record of $35,217,099.

== Impact ==
Beyond its size, the rodeo serves as a major symbol of Texas culture, celebrating Western Heritage through traditions such as trail rides, Go Texan Day, and livestock competition. HLSR is a 501(c)(3) charitable organization and ranks as the 7th-largest Better Business Bureau accredited charity in Houston. Its primary source of revenue is an annual livestock show and rodeo and the events leading up to it. HLSR has 149 full-time employees and over 36,000 volunteers, divided into 109 committees. Volunteers provide over 2.1 million hours (about 239 and a half years) of service. All of them are required to pay a minimum fee of $50, and some committees require a larger donation. The most popular committees have a wait list.

The 2025 Houston Livestock Show and Rodeo welcomed 2.7 million guests over the 23-day event, setting an all-time attendance record.

In 2025, according to the nonprofit's data, the Houston Livestock Show and Rodeo had total operating revenues of nearly $240 million and operating expenses of about $194 million, including about $19.3 million in scholarships and educational grants.

It is the largest cultural event in Houston, and its attendance numbers dwarf those of annual attendance for most professional sports teams and most major cultural events in other cities. In comparison, New Orleans' Mardi Gras generally draws about 1.4 million visitors.

In 2026, the event ran from March 2-22 and welcomed approximately 2.6 million visitors. Zinger, 2026's Grand Champion Junior Market Steer, sold for $1.5 million at auction Saturday, shattering the record of a $1 million steer sale that was set in 2022 and repeated in 2024. Champion barrows, broilers, goats and lambs also set records at auction, with total junior auction sales topping $35 million.

A 2010 economic impact analysis estimate that the HLSR funneled $220 million into the Houston economy, with almost half of that coming from visitors outside of the Houston metro region. This economic impact is driven largely by tourism, as visitors support local hotels, restaurants, and businesses during the multi-week event. HLSR and its suppliers and vendors paid over $27 million in taxes to local entities. The study's author estimates that by 2017, the HLSR would be contributing almost $500 million to the local economy each year, the equivalent of hosting the Super Bowl every year.

The Houston Livestock Show and Rodeo has made education a central part of their mission. HLSR announced a record-breaking $30,353,380 educational commitment in 2026 — the largest in its 94-year history — bringing its total support of Texas youth and education to more than $660 million since 1932. The Houston Livestock Show and Rodeo will award 541 Texas students with $20,000 scholarships, representing a $10.8 million investment in the next generation of leaders. The scholarships are part of the Rodeo’s record $15 million scholarship commitment and more than $30 million educational commitment for 2026.

Notable programs include, the Houston Livestock Show and Rodeo Houston Area Scholarship on college board awards $20,000 to an applying recipient on need-based terms for a high school student seeking to attend a school in Texas. The Hildebrand Rural Scholars Program supports students in Texas of 4-H or FFA members that demonstrate the necessary qualifications. This program has either a 4-year scholarship or Vocational Scholarship option available. In 2026, HLSR has added a vocational scholarship program that supports alternatives from the traditional four-year education by supporting workers going into different Texas industries.

== Milestones ==
1931 : First established as The Houston Fat Stock Show.
1932 : First Show is held at the Sam Houston Hall.
1937 : No rodeo due to cancellation.
1938 : Moved to new location: Sam Houston Coliseum.
1942 : First star entertainer: Gene Autry, "The Singing Cowboy"; calf scramble event added to the rodeo.
1943–45 : No rodeo due to World War II.
1946 : Rodeo resumes.
1952 : First trail ride (Salt Grass Trail Ride) commences from Brenham, Texas.
1957 : First major educational scholarship ($2,000) awarded to Ben Dickerson.
1961 : Name changes to Houston Livestock Show and Rodeo.
1963 : The School Art Program begins.
1966 : New location: Astrodome complex; Astrohall built for Livestock Exposition.
1969 : Verna Lee Hightower becomes the first black woman to compete at the show in barrel racing.
1970 : Research program launched committing $100,000 annually in support of research studies at various universities and colleges in Texas.
1974 : The first World's Championship Bar-B-Que Contest. Elvis Presley sets attendance record of 43,944. On his second show, on the same day, he breaks his own record drawing 44,175, for a one-day record of 88,119.
1975 : The Astroarena is completed.
1977 : Four-year scholarships increased from $4,000 to $6,000.
1983 : Four-year scholarships increased from $6,000 to $8,000.
1989 : Scholarship program expands to Houston metropolitan area.
1992 : Four-year scholarships upgraded from $8,000 to $10,000 retroactive to all students currently on scholarship.
1993 : Tejano superstar Selena breaks attendance record at the Astrodome by drawing a crowd of exactly 57,894 fans.
1994 : Selena sets another attendance record at the Astrodome by drawing another crowd of 60,081 fans, breaking her previous record.
1995 : Selena holds famed Astrodome concert with over 67,000 fans, again, breaking her previous records.
1997 : Rodeo Institute for Teacher Excellence is created as a three-year pilot program with $4.6 million in funding; websites www.hlsr.com and www.rodeohouston.com introduced.
1998 : Number of 4-H and FFA scholarships increased to 60 per program, totaling 120 four-year $10,000 awards.
1999 : Number of 4-H and FFA scholarships increased to 70 per program, totaling 140 four-year $10,000 awards; Opportunity Scholarships awarded based on financial need and academic excellence.
2000 : Rodeo Institute for Teacher Excellence extended another three years with another $4.6 million; Reliant Energy acquires naming rights for the Astrodomain; renamed Reliant Park includes the Reliant Astrodome, Reliant Arena, Reliant Hall, Reliant Center and Reliant Stadium.
2001 : Largest presentation of scholarships to date, with 300 four-year $10,000 awards through the Metropolitan, Opportunity and School Art scholarship programs, totaling $3 million.
2002 : George Strait sets paid attendance record for any rodeo event in the Reliant Astrodome with 68,266; Reliant Hall is demolished.
2003 : New location: Reliant Stadium and Reliant Center; Carruth Plaza, a Western sculpture garden named in honor of past president and chairman, Allen H. "Buddy" Carruth, completed at Reliant Park.
2006 : Brooks & Dunn break rodeo attendance record set by Hilary Duff in 2005 with 72,867 in attendance.
2007 : The Cheetah Girls and supporting act Hannah Montana sell out in just three minutes and set a new rodeo attendance record of 73,291.
2008 : Hannah Montana sets an attendance record of 73,459.
2008 : The Houston Livestock Show & Rodeo is inducted into the ProRodeo Hall of Fame.
2009 : Ramón Ayala y Los Bravos del Norte and Alacranes Musical set the all-time paid rodeo attendance record on Go Tejano Day, with 74,147 in attendance.
2010 : Pesado and El Trono de México set a new attendance record on Go Tejano Day with 74,222.
2012 : The Professional Bull Riders held their first event at Reliant Stadium, and it was their first to be a part of RodeoHouston.
2012 : La Original Banda El Limón and Duelo set a new rodeo attendance record on Go Tejano Day with 74,588.
2013 : Los Invasores de Nuevo León and Julión Álvarez break attendance record on Go Tejano Day with 75,305.
2013 : George Strait, Martina McBride, and the Randy Rogers Band set a new all-time attendance record with 80,020.
2015 : La Maquinaria Norteña and La Arrolladora Banda El Limón set a new all-time paid rodeo attendance record on Go Tejano Day with 75,357.
2016 : Los Huracanes del Norte and Banda Los Recoditos broke the all-time paid rodeo attendance record on Go Tejano Day with 75,508.
2017 : Siggno and Banda El Recodo broke the all-time paid rodeo attendance record on Go Tejano Day with 75,557.
2017 : The Houston Livestock Show & Rodeo set an overall attendance record of 2.6 million.
2017 : Rodeo officials announced plans to replace the stage used in NRG Stadium for concerts with a new stage resembling that of a five point star. It can fold and it can be elevated or lowered so the performer can have a higher up stage or walk on the ground level. Garth Brooks was scheduled to be the first performer on the new stage.
2018 : Garth Brooks kicked off and ended the Livestock Show & Rodeo.
2018 : Calibre 50 beat the previous year's all-time attendance record, as 75,565 fans showed up on Go Tejano Day. It was later broken by Garth Brooks, attended by 75,577.
2018 : Cody Johnson becomes the first unsigned artist to play to a sold out crowd.
2019 : Cardi B sets record, with 75,580 fans in the audience.
2019 : Los Tigres del Norte set a new rodeo-concert all-time attendance record a week later on Go Tejano Day, with 75,586 fans in the audience, beating the previous artist record holder.
2019 : George Strait breaks his own 2013 concert-only attendance record with 80,108 fans to close the 2019 show with Lyle Lovett and Robert Earl Keen opening.
2020 : The Houston Livestock Show & Rodeo was cancelled after nine days when local spread of SARS-CoV-2 coronavirus caused cases of COVID-19.
2021 : The Houston Livestock Show & Rodeo went on hiatus for the first time in 84 years.
2022 : The Houston Livestock Shown & Rodeo returned after a pandemic-based one-year hiatus.
2025 : Carín León sets a new RodeoHouston attendance record for a Latin artist outside of Go Tejano Day with 70,603.
2025 : The Houston Livestock Show & Rodeo breaks the previous overall attendance record with 2.7 million.
2026: Cody Johnson sets a new concert-only attendance record with 80,203 fans to close the 2026 show with Jon Pardi and Randy Houser opening. Special guests during Johnson's performance included Carrie Underwood and Carín León.
