= Houston Auto Show =

At NRG Park in January

The Houston Auto Show is an annual, 5 day long auto show that takes place in January at NRG Park. The show attracts many of the biggest automobile manufacturers. Each year, over 500 of the newest model year import and domestic vehicles, alternative fuel/electric vehicles and concept cars from 40+ manufacturers debut at the show.

The event is produced by the Houston Automobile Dealers Association and presented by the Houston Chronicle.

== History ==
The first Houston Auto Show took place in the Sam Houston Coliseum in the 1950s. The venue was moved in 1984 to the Astrohall, and was held there each year until 2001.

In 2002, the show moved from what was then known as Reliant Hall to its current venue, the Reliant Center after the former facility was demolished. The show regularly attracts over 450,000 visitors.

As of 2018, the Houston Auto Show is Held at the NRG Center, with over 40 manufacturers, on a footprint of over 800,000 sq ft.

The 2021 show was officially postponed from the expected January dates due to concerns with public safety during a pandemic.

== Production car introductions ==
World debuts for the Houston Auto Show include The 2013 Jeep Grand Cherokee in 2012, and the 2007 Ford Expedition in 2006.
