= Reliant Park =

Multi-venue sports and entertainment complex in Houston, Texas

Coordinates: 29°40′56″N 95°24′31″W

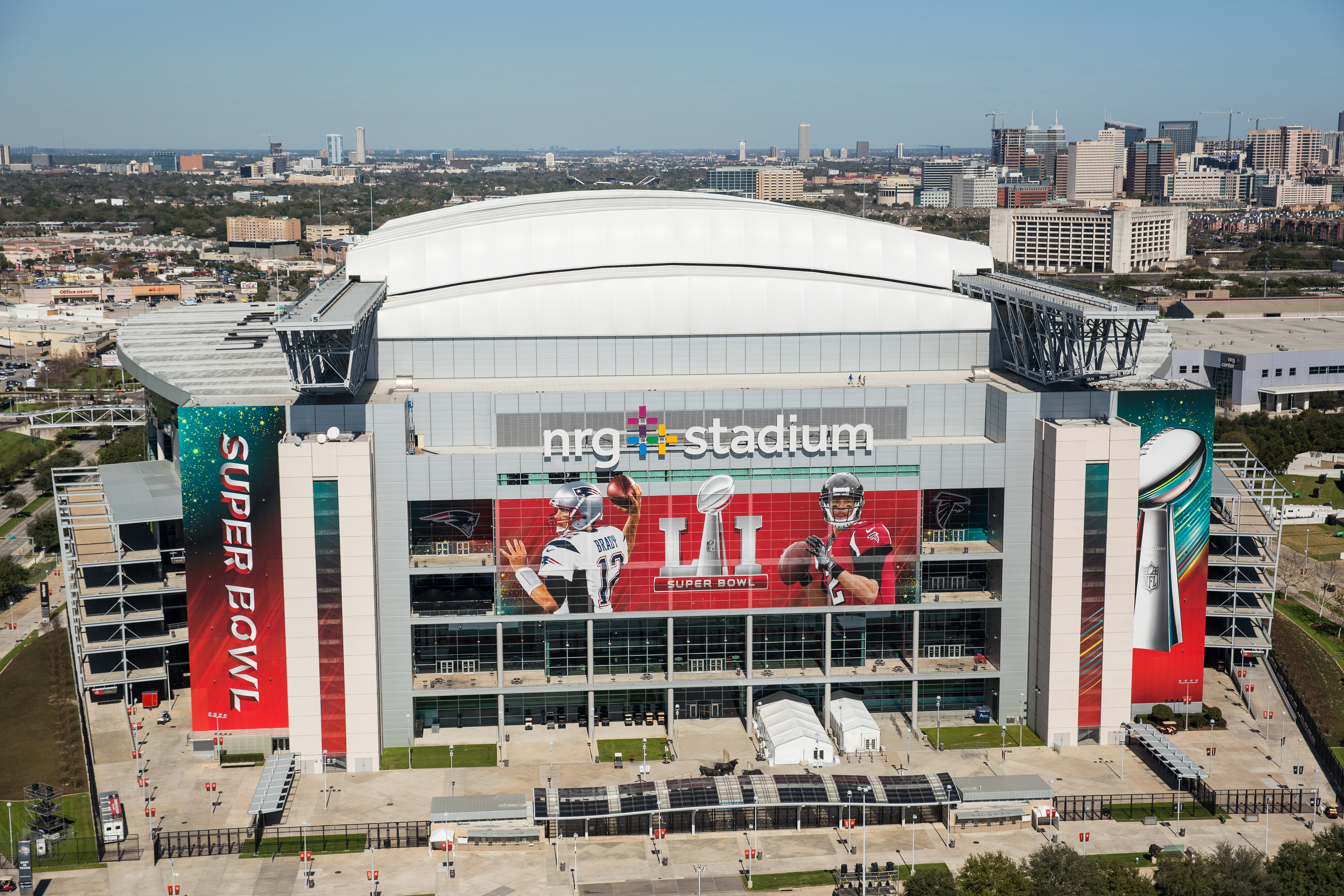
Reliant Stadium

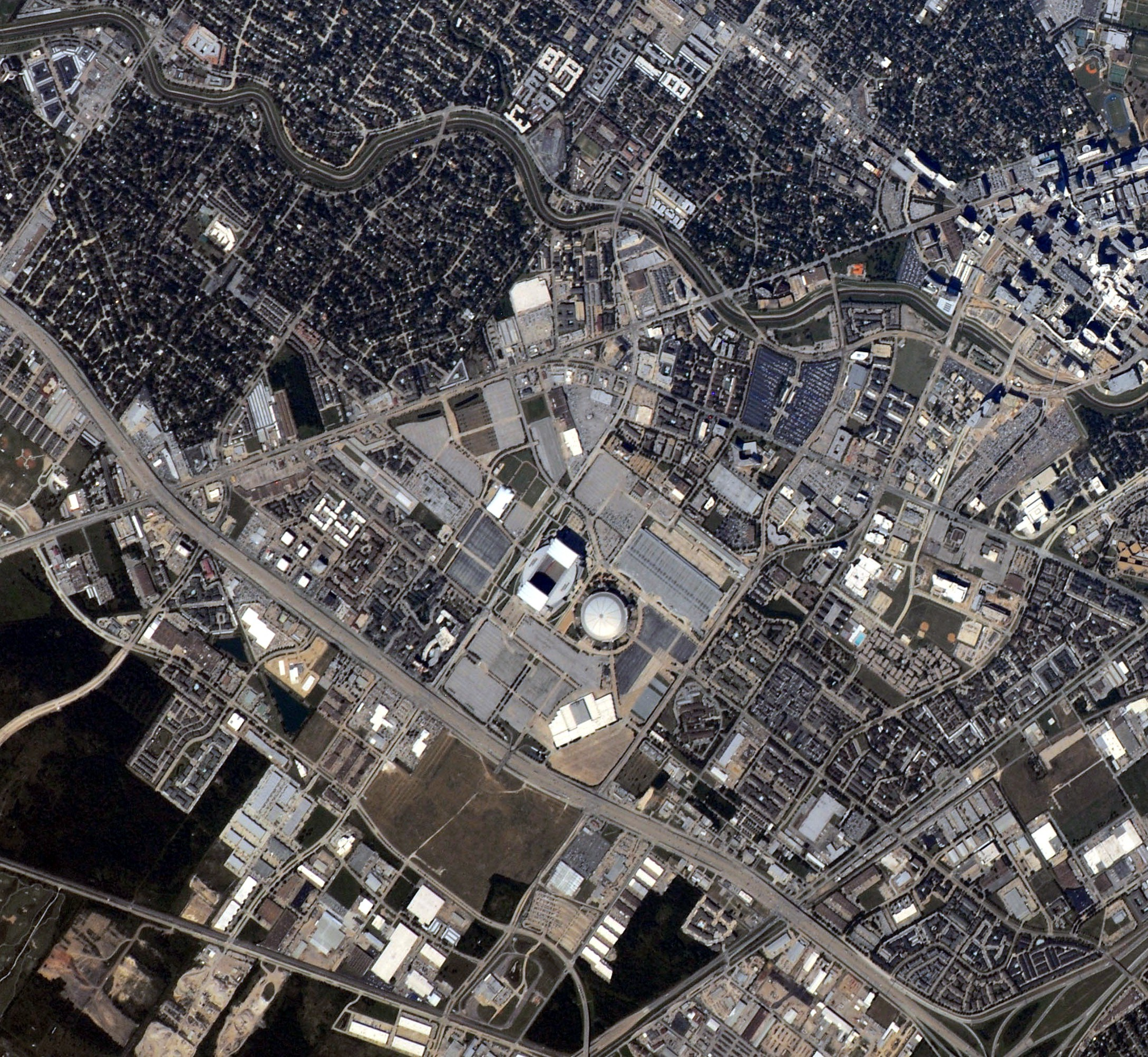
The Reliant Park area of Houston's “inner loop,” the part of the city located within Interstate Highway 610.

Reliant Park, formerly NRG Park and Astrodomain, is a complex in Houston, named after the energy company Reliant Energy. It is located on Kirby Drive at the South Loop West Freeway (I-610). This complex of buildings encompasses 350 acres (1.4 km^{2}) of land and consists of four venues: Reliant Stadium, Reliant Center, Reliant Arena and Reliant Astrodome.

The complex hosts many sporting events and conventions each year, the largest of which are Houston Texans home games, and the Houston Livestock Show and Rodeo.

The complex is served by the Stadium Park / Astrodome station, a light rail station on the Red Line of the METRORail light rail system. It includes one of the world's largest parking lots, with 26,000 places, and hosts nearly 750 events yearly. Until 2005, the lot also served as a parking lot for Six Flags Astroworld, which has since closed. From 2018 to 2021, it served as the site of the Astroworld Festival, an annual music festival run by Travis Scott, which became the site of a deadly crowd crush in 2021.

== Reliant Stadium ==
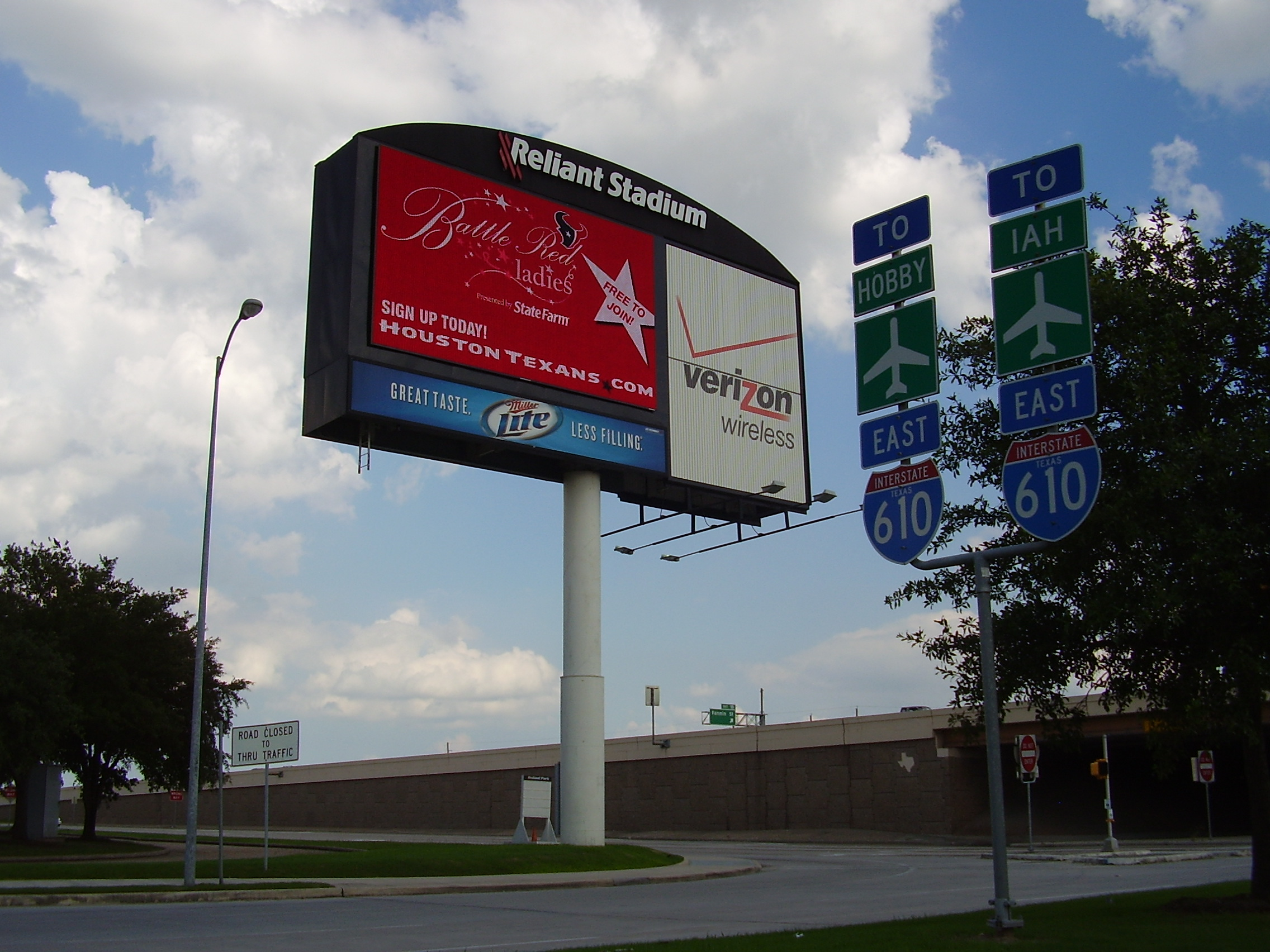
A Reliant Stadium sign at the entrance to the Reliant Park Complex

Reliant Stadium, home to the Houston Texans and the Houston Livestock Show and Rodeo, was the home of Super Bowl XXXVIII in February 2004, where the New England Patriots defeated the Carolina Panthers 32-29 and where the Super Bowl XXXVIII halftime show controversy took place. The stadium hosted Super Bowl LI in February 2017, won by the Patriots after storming back from down 25 points to the Atlanta Falcons, winning 34–28 in overtime. Reliant Stadium hosted WrestleMania XXV in April 2009, with a sellout attendance of 72,774 and a live gate of $6.9 million.

The stadium was the first NFL stadium with a retractable roof and natural grass. The stadium can be configured to utilize a 125,000-square-foot (11,600 m^{2}) space for general session, catered functions, exhibits, concerts, and much more. Reliant Stadium has four massive concourse levels for special events. The design of the stadium roof provides a very flexible rigging configuration for major audio and visual presentations. 200 suites complement Reliant Stadium.

== Reliant Center ==
The Reliant Center is a convention center located among the sports venues in Reliant Park. It opened in 2002 and hosts various events year-round, including portions of the Houston Livestock Show and Rodeo, who maintains its offices on the second floor of the building. It runs over ¼ mile in length.

With 706,000 square feet (65,600 m^{2}) of contiguous single-level exhibit space divisible into 11 separate halls, Reliant Center contains 61 meeting rooms configurable into over 100 variations, 2 major conference centers, 118 loading bays, over 150,000 square feet (14,000 m^{2}) of registration space. Reliant Center is equipped with a technological infrastructure capable of providing high-speed internet access, pre-wired fiber optic cabling backbone, on-site production facilities, 120 television monitors, and web-casting abilities.

Services include on-site support from telephone and internet, electrical, food and beverage, rigging, security and event staffing. Each meeting room has its own dedicated sound, lighting and networking capabilities. A 280,000-square-foot (26,000 m^{2}) marshalling area on-site with over 200,000 square feet (20,000 m^{2}) of space for shuttle transportation.

Along with the Houston Livestock Show and Rodeo, Reliant Center hosts some of the largest conventions and trade shows in Houston. Some examples of these events are the Offshore Technology Conference, Nutcracker Market, Houston Auto Show, International Gem & Jewelry Show, Houston Gun Collector's and Antique Show, and the Houston Boat, Sport and Travel Show - to name a few.

== Reliant Arena ==
The Reliant Arena, formerly known as the "Astro Arena", is a 350,000-square-foot (33,000 m^{2}) sports center. It was completed in 1971 and located adjacent to the Astro Hall (later renamed the Reliant Hall), which was demolished in May 2002 to make room for more parking. The Arena has been the home of several different events, including the Houston Hotshots, Houston's former indoor soccer team and smaller wrestling events such as WCW Thunder.

With fixed seating in the main arena for 5,800 and floor space encompassing approximately 25,000 square feet (2,300 m^{2}), Reliant Arena is ideal for general sessions and events for less than 10,000. Reliant Arena's pavilion has 1,700 fixed seats and is surrounded by over 325,000 square feet (30,200 m^{2}) of exhibit space divisible into four halls. Reliant Arena includes over 18,000 square feet (1,700 m^{2}) of meeting space.

Some of the latest events to come through Reliant Arena are the And 1 Mix Tape Tour, Hannah Montana, The Cheetah Girls, and Sesame Street Live.

== Reliant Astrodome ==
A map of venues at Reliant Park

The Reliant Astrodome, formerly known as just the Houston Astrodome, is called the "Eighth Wonder of the World" by many as it is the first domed structure of its size created without a pillar supporting it in the center. The Astrodome opened for business on April 9, 1965, and was the home of the Houston Astros and Houston Oilers for over 30 years before both teams moved out, the former to Daikin Park and the latter to Nashville, Tennessee, where they eventually became the Tennessee Titans.

The Astrodome has been the home of many other special events, including the Republican National Convention, the NBA All-Star Game, and World Wrestling Federation (WWF) WrestleMania X-Seven. The venue has hosted historic recording artists such as Elvis Presley. Until 2002, Reliant Astrodome was also the host of the Houston Livestock Show and Rodeo, the largest of its kind in the world. The last concert in Reliant Astrodome was the largest attended event ever in the building, featuring George Strait in March 2002, at the Livestock Show and Rodeo where he sang to 68,266 people.

The Astrodome and Reliant Park in general gained nationwide attention in September 2005 when it was opened as a massive shelter for refugees fleeing Hurricane Katrina. Each building except for Reliant Stadium, which was configured for the Houston Texans, hosted several thousand refugees, and local media dubbed the complex "Reliant City". This "city" was itself evacuated when Hurricane Rita threatened Texas later that month, but many returned after the scare and moved out shortly before the end of the year.

The Astrodome has been closed to the general public since 2008 because of fire code violations, and was to undergo renovations in October 2018 to become a multi-purpose event center. The floor of the stadium would have been raised and would have created over 1,000+ parking spaces, while the top floor would be used for events. The project was supposed to start in October 2018 and be completed sometime in 2020. Harris County was to spend $105 million in order to complete this massive overhaul. The renovations were rescheduled to 2019, and then put on hold, and then all together scrapped.

== MDAnderson Cancer Center Speedway at Reliant Park ==
A map of the MDAnderson Cancer Center Speedway at Reliant Park

The MDAnderson Cancer Center Speedway at Reliant Park was a temporary street circuit configured throughout Reliant Park's parking lot. The speedway hosted the Grand Prix of Houston, a Champ Car race held in 2006 and 2007. The pit lane and paddock for the race teams were located in Reliant Arena. Due to the merger between Champ Car and the Indy Racing League in 2008, the 2008 Grand Prix of Houston was canceled.

In March 2012, the Verizon IndyCar Series announced that the Grand Prix of Houston would return in 2013 to the temporary circuit in Reliant Park. The first race since the merger was a doubleheader, with the races won by Scott Dixon and Will Power. The weekend featured a horrible accident in the second race. Dario Franchitti and Takuma Sato made contact in turn 5 on the last lap, making Franchitti airborne, hitting the catchfence similar to Kenny Brack's incident in 2003 at Texas.

The accident injured 13 fans from flying debris. The race returned in June 2014 with safety upgrades for both drivers and fans, featuring updated fencing and the removal of grandstands from where the 2013 accident had happened. Carlos Huertas and Simon Pagenaud won the two Verizon indyCar Series races of the weekend.

The track was sponsored by JAGFlo in 2007.

=== Lap records ===
The fastest official race lap records at Houston-Reliant Park (JAGFlo Speedway at Reliant Park) are listed in:

Events and tenants
Preceded by EPCOT	Host of FIRST Robotics World Championship; 2003	Succeeded by Georgia Dome
