= Mr San Peppy =

20th-century American Quarter Horse stallion

- Breed: American Quarter Horse
- Discipline: Cutting
- Sire: Leo San
- Grandsire: Leo P-1335
- Dam: Peppy Belle
- Maternal grandsire: Pep Up
- Sex: Stallion
- Foaled: 1968
- Country: United States
- Color: Sorrel
- Breeder: Gordon B. Howell
- Owner: King Ranch

Other awards
- 1972 NCHA Derby Champion; 1973 NCHA World Champion; 1975 AQHA High Point Cutting Horse; 1976 NCHA World Champion; 1976 AQHA World Champion Senior Cutting; 1976 AQHA High Point Cutting Horse; AQHA Superior Cutting Horse; AQHA Performance ROM

Honors
- American Quarter Horse Hall of Fame

Mr San Peppy (1968–1998) was an American Quarter Horse stallion and a famous cutting horse. He was the National Cutting Horse Association, or NCHA, World Champion in 1973 and 1976. He was also the American Quarter Horse Association, or AQHA, World Champion in Senior Cutting in 1976, as well as being named the High Point Cutting Horse by the AQHA in 1975 and 1976. He went on to become a notable breeding stallion and was inducted into the American Quarter Horse Hall of Fame in 2011. His full brother, Peppy San, was inducted into the Hall of Fame in 1999.

== Life ==
Mr San Peppy was a 1968 sorrel stallion, and was bred by Gordon B. Howell of Dallas, Texas. Sired by Leo San who was by American Quarter Horse Hall of Fame member Leo, Mr San Peppy was out of Peppy Belle, a daughter of Pep Up. His second dam, or maternal grandmother, was Belle Burnett by Gold Rush.

== Cutting career ==
Mr San Peppy was named the NCHA World Champion in 1973 and 1976. He was AQHA World Champion Senior Cutting Horse in 1976, and was awarded the title of AQHA High Point Cutting Horse in 1975 and 1976. He also won the NCHA 1972 Derby and in total earned $107,866 in NCHA earnings. From the AQHA he earned the title of Superior Cutting Horse and Performance Register of Merit. He also earned the NCHA's Silver and Bronze awards.

== Breeding record ==
During Mr San Peppy's breeding career he sired 23 foal crops, with a total of 1327 horses registered with the AQHA. His most famous son was probably Peppy San Badger, who was inducted into the AQHA Hall of Fame in 2008. Among the other horses sired by him were Peppy San Chato, the 1982 AQHA High Point Calf Roping Gelding, Peppy Rancho, the 1984 AQHA High Point Heading Stallion and 1984 AQHA High Point Heeling Stallion, Organ Grinder, the 1984 AQHA High Point Cutting Horse, Tenino San, the 1982 NCHA World Champion, and Peppys Regona, the 1984 AQHA High Point Cutting Mare.

== Death and honors ==
Mr San Peppy suffered a stroke in 1998 and was euthanized. He was inducted into the NCHA Horse Hall of Fame, along with his son Peppy San Badger and his full brother Peppy San. He was inducted into the AQHA Hall of Fame in 2011, joining his son Peppy San Badger and his full brother, who was inducted in 1999.

== Pedigree ==
Joe Reed II
Leo P-1335
Little Fanny
Leo San
San Siemon
San Sue Darks
Little Sue
Mr San Peppy
Macanudo
Pep Up
Petra R2
Peppy Belle
Gold Rush
Belle Burnett
Triangle Lady 9
