= Deep Creek (Trinity River tributary) =

Stream in Wise County, Texas, U.S.

Coordinates: 33°06′52″N 97°31′35″W

Deep Creek is a stream in Wise County, Texas.

== Description ==
The creek rises to the southeast of Decatur, close to U.S. Route 287. The creek flows south for five miles before meeting the Trinity River between Boyd and Aurora.

== History ==
Sam Woody, an early settler, built a wooden house on the bank of the stream in 1854, establishing the first home in Wise County. A small community named Deep Creek soon formed, however a cemetery is the only remaining feature.

== See also ==
- List of rivers of Texas
