= Wise County Courthouse =

Wise County Courthouse may refer to:

- Wise County Courthouse (Texas), Decatur, Texas listed on the National Register of Historic Places
- Wise County Courthouse (Virginia), Wise, Virginia
