= Briar, Texas =

- CDP
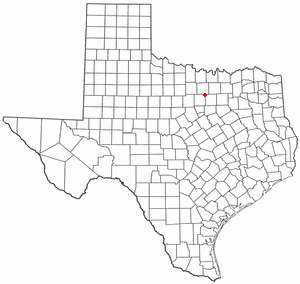
- Location of Briar, Texas

- Coordinates: 32°57′50″N 97°32′50″W
- Country: United States
- State: Texas
- Counties: Tarrant, Wise, Parker

Area
  - Total: 21.9 sq mi (56.8 km^{2})
  - Land: 20.5 sq mi (53.0 km^{2})
  - Water: 1.5 sq mi (3.9 km^{2})
- Elevation: 712 ft (217 m)

Population (2020)
  - Total: 7,035
  - Density: 344/sq mi (133/km^{2})
- Time zone: UTC-6 (Central (CST))
  - Summer (DST): UTC-5 (CDT)
- Zip Code: 76023, 76020, 76179
- FIPS code: 48-10192
- GNIS feature ID: 2407903

Briar is a census-designated place (CDP) in Parker, Tarrant and Wise counties in the U.S. state of Texas, near the west side of Eagle Mountain Lake. The population was 7,035 in 2020.

== Geography ==
According to the United States Census Bureau, the CDP has a total area of 21.9 square miles (56.8 km^{2}), of which 20.5 square miles (53.0 km^{2}) is land and 1.5 square miles (3.9 km^{2}), or 6.83%, is water.

== Demographics ==
Historical population
Census	Pop.	Note	%±
1970	630		—
1980	1,810		187.3%
1990	3,899		115.4%
2000	5,350		37.2%
2010	5,665		5.9%
2020	7,035		24.2%
U.S. Decennial Census; 1850–1900 1910; 1920 1930 1940; 1950 1960 1970; 1980 1990 2000; 2010

Briar was incorporated as a city prior to the 1970 U.S. census; and after disincorporation, it was listed as a census designated place in the 1990 U.S. census.

=== 2020 census ===
Briar CDP, Texas – Racial and ethnic composition Note: the US Census treats Hispanic/Latino as an ethnic category. This table excludes Latinos from the racial categories and assigns them to a separate category. Hispanics/Latinos may be of any race.
Race / Ethnicity (NH = Non-Hispanic)	Pop 2000	Pop 2010	Pop 2020	% 2000	% 2010	% 2020
White alone (NH)	4,979	4,983	5,605	93.07%	87.96%	79.67%
Black or African American alone (NH)	25	39	69	0.47%	0.69%	0.98%
Native American or Alaska Native alone (NH)	34	45	40	0.64%	0.79%	0.57%
Asian alone (NH)	20	40	46	0.37%	0.71%	0.65%
Native Hawaiian or Pacific Islander alone (NH)	0	9	8	0.00%	0.16%	0.11%
Other race alone (NH)	3	7	17	0.06%	0.12%	0.24%
Mixed race or Multiracial (NH)	52	91	336	0.97%	1.61%	4.78%
Hispanic or Latino (any race)	237	451	914	4.43%	7.96%	12.99%
Total	5,350	5,665	7,035	100.00%	100.00%	100.00%

As of the 2020 United States census, there were 7,035 people, 1,908 households, and 1,437 families residing in the CDP.

== Facilities ==
Briar has three convenience stores, a liquor store, and a bar. One of the stores also has a grill-type restaurant. It is located close to Azle and Boyd, towns with a wide variety of retail businesses. Briar has several churches and a quaint, small-town feel.

== Education ==
Briar is served by the Azle, Boyd, and Springtown Independent School Districts.
