= Walnut Creek (Wise County) =

Creek in northern Texas

Coordinates: 33°08′38″N 97°34′11″W

Walnut Creek is a creek in Wise County, Texas.

== Description ==
The creek rises to the south of Decatur, flowing south for 9 miles before meeting the West Fork of the Trinity River north of Boyd.

== Little Walnut Creek ==
Little Walnut Creek is a short creek that meets the main creek in Annaville.
