= Wagoner Branch =

Stream in Wise County, Texas, U.S.

Coordinates: 33°14′57″N 97°36′06″W

Wagoner Branch is a stream in Wise County, Texas.

== Description ==
The creek rises north of Decatur, west of the Decatur Municipal Airport flowing southeast for eight miles, passing under U.S. Route 287 and U.S. Route 380 before meeting the West Fork of the Trinity River to the north of Paradise.

== See also ==
- List of rivers of Texas
