= Center Creek (Texas) =

Stream in Wise County, Texas, U.S.

Coordinates: 33°12′31″N 97°33′24″W

Center Creek is a stream in Wise County, Texas.

== Description ==
The creek rises to the south of Decatur and flows south-west for 8 miles. The creek becomes Martin Branch before meeting the West Fork of the Trinity River east of Paradise.

== See also ==
- List of rivers of Texas
