= Denton Creek =

Location
- Country: United States
- State: Texas

Physical characteristics
- Mouth
  - location: 32°58′13″N 96°56′34″W

Denton Creek is a creek in Texas, beginning in Wise County, and flowing south-east into Denton County. It was dammed by the Army Corps of Engineers to make Lake Grapevine. The Army Corps of Engineers are in charge of the height but still flooded many areas in early 2016. After flowing out of the lake, it flows into the Trinity River. The creek and lake are popular for fishing, boating, and recreation due to its location within the Dallas-Fort Worth Metroplex. The creek has many forks along its path.

The creek flows into the lake in the area known as Trophy Club Park (formerly Marshall Creek Park) in Trophy Club.

== See also ==
- List of rivers of Texas
- Denton, Texas
- Sweetwater Creek (Wise County, Texas)
