= Decatur High School (Texas) =

Location
- 750 E Eagle Summit Dr; Decatur, Texas 76234-3609; United States; 33°12′56″N 97°34′34″W

Information
- School type: Public high school
- School district: Decatur Independent School District
- Principal: Tammy Allen
- Teaching staff: 68.94 (FTE)
- Grades: 9-12
- Enrollment: 1,162 (2023-2024)
- Student to teacher ratio: 16.86
- Colors: Blue, black, and white
- Athletics conference: UIL Class AAAA
- Mascot: Regal Eagle
- Website: https://www.decaturisd.us/

Decatur High School is a public high school located in Decatur, Texas (United States). It is part of the Decatur Independent School District located in central Wise County and classified as a 4A school by the UIL. In 2015, the school was rated "Met Standard" by the Texas Education Agency.

== Athletics ==
The Decatur Eagles offer many opportunities for students to participate in sports. -

Cross Country, Volleyball, Football, Basketball, Powerlifting, Swimming, Soccer, Golf, Tennis, Track, Softball & Baseball

=== State Titles ===
- Boys Cross Country -
  - 2001(3A), 2005(3A), 2006(3A), 2012(3A) 2018 (4A), 2019 (4A)
- Boys Golf -
  - 1976(2A), 1977(2A)
- Girls Basketball -
  - 2025(4A/D1), 2026(4A/D1)
- Girls Cross Country -
  - 1999(3A), 2005(3A), 2008(3A), 2009(3A)
- Volleyball -
  - 2013(3A), 2014(4A), 2018(4A), 2020 (4A), 2021(4A), 2024(4A/D1), 2025(4A/D1), 2026(4A/D1)
- One Act Play -
  - 2006(3A)
