= Alvord High School =

Location
- 1049 W Bypass Hwy 287; Alvord, Texas 76225-0070; United States

Information
- School type: Public high school
- School district: Alvord Independent School District
- Principal: Aaron Tefertiller
- Staff: 25.94 (FTE)
- Grades: 9-12
- Enrollment: 236 (2023–2024)
- Student to teacher ratio: 9.10
- Colors: Black and Vegas gold
- Athletics conference: UIL Class AA
- Mascot: Bulldog
- Yearbook: Bulldog
- Website: Alvord High School

Alvord High School is a public high school located in the city of Alvord, Texas, USA and classified as a 2A school by the UIL. It is a part of the Alvord Independent School District located in north central Wise County. In 2015, the school was rated "Met Standard" by the Texas Education Agency.

== Athletics ==
The Alvord Bulldogs compete in these sports -

Volleyball, Cross Country, Football, Basketball, Powerlifting, Golf, Tennis, Track, Baseball & Softball

=== State Titles ===
- Girls Cross Country -
  - 1998(1A), 1999(1A)

==== State Finalist ====
- Girls Basketball -
  - 1995(1A)
