= Sycamore, Texas =

- Unincorporated community
- Location within Texas Location within the United States
- Coordinates: 33°19′25″N 97°29′24″W
- Country: United States
- State: Texas
- County: Wise
- Elevation: 856 ft (261 m)
- Time zone: UTC-6 (Central (CST))
  - Summer (DST): UTC-5 (CDT)
- ZIP code: 76234
- Area code: 940
- GNIS feature ID: 1380635

Sycamore is an unincorporated community in Wise County, Texas, United States. The community is located northeast of Decatur, and south of Greenwood and Slidell

== History ==
The site was named for the local Sycamore trees in the area, with the first settlers arriving in the late 19th-century. Initially Sycamore contained general stores, churches, a blacksmith and a cotton gin. The post office was established on August 17, 1894, with David S. Cox being the first postmaster. The town declined by the 1920s, with most businesses moving to nearby Decatur.
