= Wise County Messenger =

American weekly newspaper

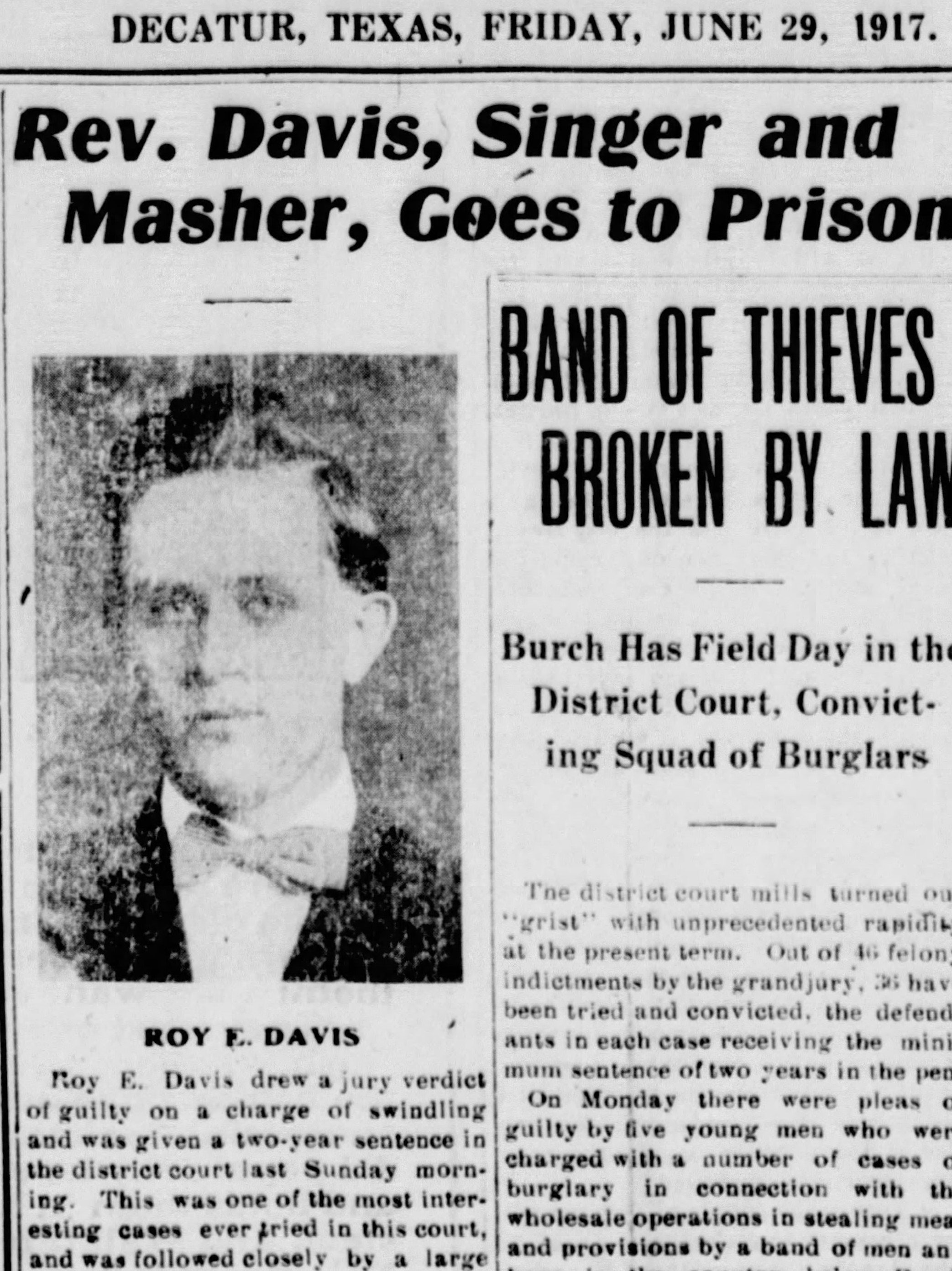
- Ku Klux Klan founder Roy Elonzo Davis featured in the Wise County Messenger, June 29, 1917
- Type: Weekly newspaper
- Format: Broadsheet
- Owner(s): Roy and Jeannine Eaton
- Editor: Austin Jackson
- Founded: 1880
- Headquarters: 115 S Trinity Street; Decatur, Texas 76234; United States
- Circulation: 4,130 (as of 2023)
- Website: www.wcmessenger.com

The Wise County Messenger is a weekly newspaper published in Decatur, Texas, on Thursday mornings.

== History ==
The newspaper was established in 1880, and is one of the oldest business institutions in Wise County. Although the newspaper was printed in various locations throughout the county including Paradise, it has been published in Decatur since 1885. Roy and Jeannine Eaton have owned the Messenger since 1973.

The newspaper was registered as a Texas Historic Landmark in 1981.
