= Sweetwater Creek (Wise County, Texas) =

Stream in Wise County, Texas, U.S.

Coordinates: 33°14′30″N 97°27′26″W

Sweetwater Creek is a stream in Wise County, Texas.

== Description ==
The creek rises east of Decatur, flowing east for 10 miles before meeting Denton Creek. Outlaws Jesse and Frank James are known to have camped by the creek.

== See also ==
- List of rivers of Texas
