= Billy Joe Tolliver =

American football player (born 1966)

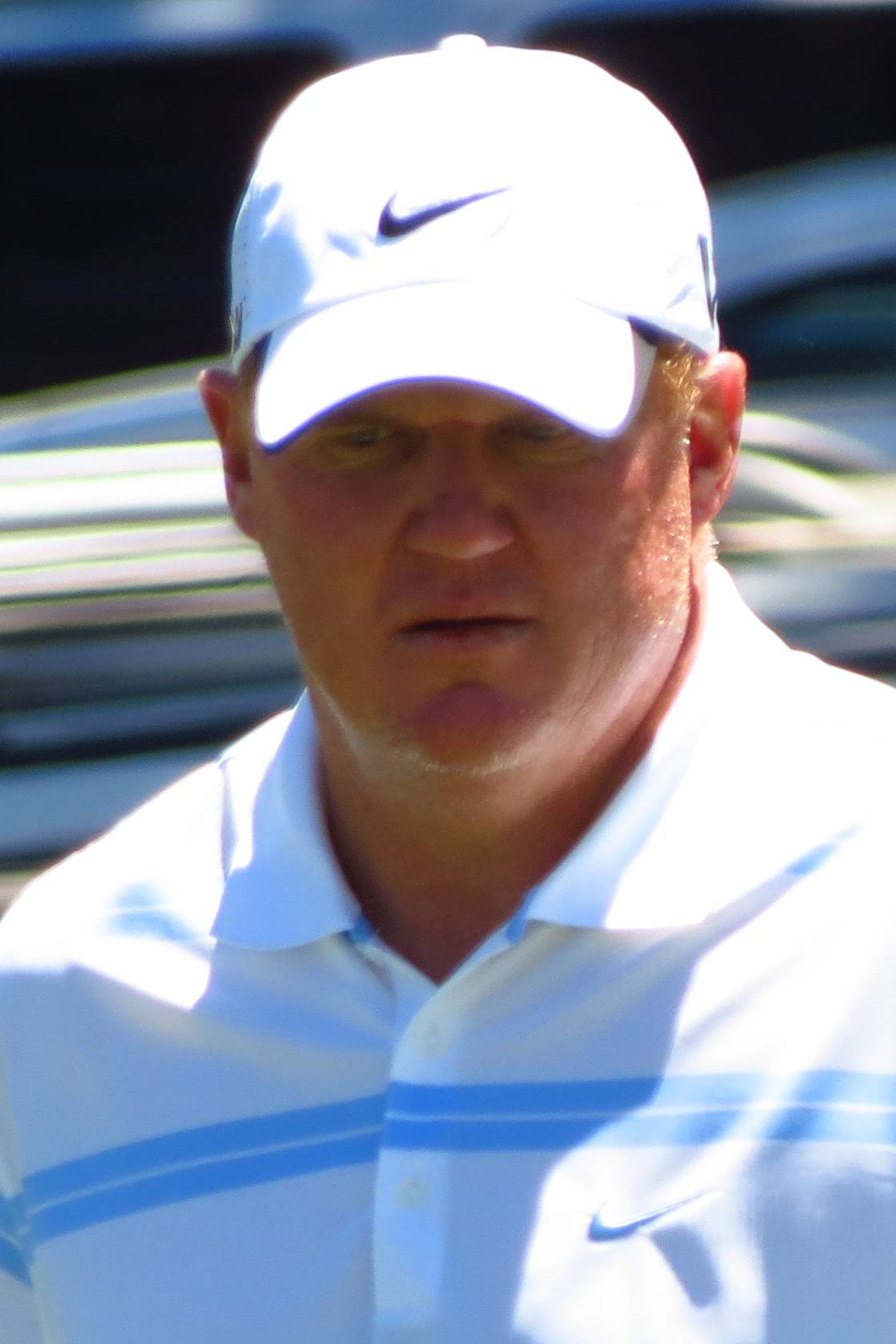
- Tolliver in 2011

No. 8, 11, 13
- Position: Quarterback

Personal information
- Born: February 7, 1966 (age 60); Dallas, Texas, U.S.
- Listed height: 6 ft 1 in (1.85 m)
- Listed weight: 217 lb (98 kg)

Career information
- High school: Boyd (Boyd, Texas)
- College: Texas Tech (1984–1988)
- NFL draft: 1989: 2nd round, 51st overall pick

Career history
- San Diego Chargers (1989–1990); Atlanta Falcons (1991–1993); Houston Oilers (1994); Shreveport Pirates (1995); Atlanta Falcons (1996–1997); Kansas City Chiefs (1997); New Orleans Saints (1998–2000); Chicago Bears (2001)*; Green Bay Packers (2001)*
- * Offseason or practice squad member only

Awards and highlights
- 2× First-team All-SWC (1987, 1988)

Career NFL statistics
- Passing attempts: 1,707
- Passing completions: 891
- Completion percentage: 52.2%
- TD–INT: 59–64
- Passing yards: 10,760
- Passer rating: 67.7
- Stats at Pro Football Reference

Billy Joe Tolliver (born February 7, 1966) is an American former professional football player who was a quarterback in the National Football League (NFL) and Canadian Football League (CFL) for twelve seasons with the San Diego Chargers, Atlanta Falcons, Houston Oilers, Shreveport Pirates, Kansas City Chiefs, and New Orleans Saints. Over the course of his NFL career, he played in 79 games, completed 891 of 1,707 passes for 10,760 yards, threw 59 touchdowns and 64 interceptions, and retired with a passer rating of 67.7.

A graduate of Boyd High School and Texas Tech University, Tolliver was selected in the second round of the 1989 NFL draft by the San Diego Chargers. He started 19 games in two seasons at San Diego before being traded to Atlanta, where he saw playing time as a backup for three seasons. In 1994, he became one of three starting quarterbacks for Houston and then served as quarterback of the Shreveport Pirates in the CFL during their final season of activity in 1995. After not competing in 1996, Tolliver played for both Atlanta and Kansas City in 1997. He then started 11 games for New Orleans in two seasons but did not take the field in 2000. A stint with the Green Bay Packers in the 2001 offseason concluded his professional career.

== Early life ==
Tolliver grew up in Boyd, Texas, where he attended local schools. He played high school football at Boyd High School. During his senior season, he led the Boyd Yellowjackets to a 15–0–1 record and the 2–A state championship. He amassed more than 1,000 rushing and passing yards and was named Player of the Year by the Fort Worth Star-Telegram. Tolliver was a three–sport athlete in high school, averaging 15 points and 17 rebounds in basketball and throwing 14 no-hitters in baseball.

== College career ==
After graduating from high school, Tolliver played college football at Texas Tech University and was a member of the Delta Tau Delta fraternity. His hard throwing style led Texas Tech head coach David McWilliams to say, "He throws the ball harder, and with more velocity, than anyone I've ever seen." He redshirted his freshman season in 1984 and became the starting quarterback in 1985. On November 9, 1985, Tolliver had his first breakout performance for the Red Raiders as he threw for a record-setting 422 yards and five touchdowns in a 63–7 win over Texas Christian University (TCU), a feat that helped him become a household name in Texas. As he began his sophomore season, he was considered the lone bright spot on Texas Tech's offense. Tolliver struggled at the start of the year; by the end of September he had only completed 54 of 123 passes. After throwing five interceptions in a game against Baylor, he shrugged off the bad game, saying, "even Betty Crocker burns a cake every now and then." His fortunes continued to sink when in a game in late October against the Rice Owls, he was benched, and backup quarterback Monte McGuire rallied the team to a victory. However, Tolliver regained his starting job and brought his team to the 1986 Independence Bowl as Texas Tech won six games for the first time since 1978. He finished the season with 1,802 passing yards and seven touchdowns.

Tolliver was to begin his junior year facing Florida State, but he suffered a hairline fracture in his foot during practice, leaving him doubtful for the game. He missed the first three games of the season but returned in Texas Tech's fourth game against Baylor, completing 14 of 25 passes for 189 yards, a touchdown and an interception in a 36–22 loss. Tolliver's next big performance came against TCU, the same team he defeated 63–7 as a freshman. He threw a touchdown pass to Wayne Walker in the last minute to beat TCU 36–35. He finished the season having passed for 1,422 yards and seven touchdowns in eight games. The next season, his senior year, Tolliver and Texas Tech sought to win the Southwest Conference. He started the season strong, throwing an 85-yard pass against Arizona—it was the third-longest pass in school history—but the Red Raiders started with two losses. By the end of the season, Tolliver had set 16 school records and was awarded the Southwest Conference Sportsmanship Award by the league's officials. After four seasons with Texas Tech, he set the school record for career passing yards (6,756), career pass attempts (1,008), career pass completions (493), career touchdown passes (38), season passing yards in 1988 (2,869), and single game passing yards (446) against Oklahoma State University in 1988. Tolliver was inducted into Texas Tech's Hall of Honor in 2002.

== Professional career ==
Pre-draft measurables
Height	Weight	40-yard dash	10-yard split	20-yard split	20-yard shuttle	Vertical jump
6 ft 0 5/8 in (1.84 m)	217 lb (98 kg)	5.09 s	1.68 s	2.95 s	4.42 s	28.5 in (0.72 m)
All values from NFL Combine

=== San Diego Chargers ===
Tolliver was selected by the San Diego Chargers in the second round of the 1989 NFL draft with the 51st overall pick. The Chargers traded third, fourth, and seventh-round picks in exchange for the New York Giants' second-round pick in order to draft him. Tolliver was signed on July 31, 1989, after a short holdout. He was to compete with Mark Malone and David Archer for the starting job, a spot which eventually went to Jim McMahon after the Chargers traded for him. As the 1989 season began with McMahon at the helm, Tolliver was slated to play the second half of the final preseason game against the Phoenix Cardinals. After 13 completions in 23 attempts, Tolliver ran the ball late in the game and broke his collarbone, sidelining him for at least six weeks. After spending the first seven games on the injured reserve list, Tolliver was taken off the list and named the starter for the game against the Seattle Seahawks on October 29, replacing McMahon who had disappointed at quarterback. In Tolliver's first start, he played three quarters, throwing six completed passes in 17 attempts for 41 yards and throwing an interception in a 10–7 loss. Tolliver subsequently lost the starting job back to McMahon. However, in late November, Tolliver was given the starting job back, remaining the starting quarterback the rest of the season. Tolliver finished the season having played five games with 89 completions in 185 attempts, 1097 yards, five touchdowns, eight interceptions, and a 57.9 quarterback rating.

As the 1990 season began, McMahon was released by the team, leaving Tolliver as the starting quarterback at training camp. After training camp and a preseason in which Tolliver started and was relieved by quarterbacks Mark Vlasic and rookie John Friesz, Chargers head coach Dan Henning named Vlasic as the starting quarterback against the Dallas Cowboys in the season opener, saying that he was "steadier" than Tolliver. After a loss against Dallas, Tolliver regained his starting job during the game two against the Cincinnati Bengals. Despite some shaky performances in the following weeks, the Chargers' coaching staff stuck by their quarterback, saying that "the last thing we need around here is more change." Tolliver played nearly the rest of the season as the starting quarterback but was replaced by Friesz for the final game of the season against the Los Angeles Raiders. The Chargers made this move because, according to Henning, "Tolliver has to work on his shortcomings." Tolliver finished the season having completed 216 of 410 passes, thrown for 2,574 yards, 16 touchdowns, and 16 interceptions, and posting a QB rating of 68.9.

Although Tolliver had the confidence of Dan Henning, Chargers general manager Bobby Beathard and owner Alex Spanos were unsatisfied with his production during the 1990 season, and were looking towards Friesz as the future quarterback. Tolliver was the leading man for the starting quarterback position as training camp for the 1991 season began, with Friesz battling Bob Gagliano for the backup spot. However, after training camp ended, Friesz was named the starting quarterback for the 1991 season opener against the Pittsburgh Steelers.

=== Atlanta Falcons ===
Just a few days after losing the starting job, Tolliver was traded to the Atlanta Falcons for a fifth-round draft pick. In Atlanta, Tolliver was the backup quarterback behind Chris Miller and alongside rookie Brett Favre, and played part of seven games throughout the season. Tolliver's breakthrough as a Falcon came against the San Francisco 49ers on November 3. Miller was injured in the second quarter, and Tolliver was brought in for the rest of the game. With one second left, he threw a 44-yard Hail Mary pass to Michael Haynes, which was caught for a touchdown and sealing a 17–14 upset victory. Due to his performance and Miller's injury, Tolliver was given his first start the following week against the Washington Redskins. Tolliver's first start with the Falcons was a 56–17 blowout loss. Afterwards, Tolliver got his second and last start of the season against the Green Bay Packers as a result of Miller suddenly running a fever. Tolliver finished the regular season having completing 40 of 82 passes with four touchdowns, two interceptions, and a QB rating of 75.8.

After the Falcons traded Favre to the Packers, Miller and Tolliver were the only quarterbacks on the roster. Before the season started, Wade Wilson signed with the team, and the two shared the role of backup to Miller. Tolliver played two of the first eight games, then was named the starting quarterback when the Falcons lost Miller for the season as a result of reconstructive surgery on his left knee. Tolliver's first start of the season came against the 49ers. He completed 16 of 25 passes, but threw three interceptions in a 41–3 loss. The next week against the Cardinals, Tolliver was benched for the final series as Wilson led the team to victory and Tolliver argued with coach Jerry Glanville. Despite the conflict and a shoulder injury, Glanville gave Tolliver the start the following week against the Buffalo Bills. He played a few more games before being replaced by Wilson for the rest of the season, partially as a result of Wilson throwing five touchdown passes in his first start en route to a 35–7 Falcons victory. Tolliver finished the season with five touchdowns, five interceptions, a 55.7% completion percentage, and a 70.4 QB rating.

After the 1992 season, Tolliver was a restricted free agent. Wilson signed a contract with the Saints, and to replace him the Falcons signed Bobby Hebert. Tolliver signed a one-year contract in August, after holding out for a time. Tolliver started the 1993 season as the third-string quarterback behind Hebert and Miller. However, Miller re-injured his left knee in late September, making Tolliver the main backup to Hebert. Tolliver made his first start against the Los Angeles Rams, but was injured in his second start against the Saints; the Falcons signed Chris Hakel as a result of the injury. Tolliver finished the season in occasional relief for Hebert, who remained bothered by injuries. Over the course of the year, Tolliver played in seven games and threw for just under 500 yards, and became a free agent after the season ended.

=== Houston Oilers ===
In early September 1994, Tolliver was signed to a contract by the Houston Oilers. He was originally the third-string quarterback, but ineffectiveness by Bucky Richardson led Tolliver to relieve him in a game against the Cleveland Browns. Tolliver played well enough to be considered for the starting job the following week due to Cody Carlson dealing with injuries. Tolliver made his first start in a game against the Raiders, but played inconsistently over seven starts and was replaced by Richardson in the season finale against the New York Jets. After finishing the season, Tolliver became a free agent and left the NFL.

=== Shreveport Pirates ===
Tolliver signed a three-year contract worth about $1 million with the Shreveport Pirates of the Canadian Football League before the 1995 season began. Early in the season, Tolliver got to compete against former teammate David Archer in the San Antonio Texans' CFL debut. He finished the season having thrown for 3,767 yards, 16 touchdowns, and 15 interceptions. After the team folded following a 5–13 season, Tolliver was again without a team.

=== Atlanta Falcons (second stint) ===
In October 1996, Tolliver rejoined the Falcons as the third-string quarterback, this time sitting behind Bobby Hebert and Browning Nagle. He spent the 1996 season on the bench, and did not take a snap in a game. He was re-signed by Atlanta in April and given a one-year contract worth $325,000.

Tolliver was slated to compete with Tommy Maddox for the backup quarterback spot at Atlanta as training camp rolled around. Halfway through August, Maddox was released, and Tolliver was made the primary backup behind Chris Chandler. Tolliver played his first NFL game since 1994 on September 7, 1997, against the Carolina Panthers. He completed 7 of 17 passes for 79 yards. After relieving Chandler again the following week, Tolliver was slated to start the next game against the 49ers, in what became his only starting appearance of the season. He was slated to start again against the Denver Broncos, but instead came in late in the game. He was almost able to lead the Falcons to a comeback victory over the Broncos, completing six of nine passes for 85 yards and a touchdown, but he instead lost to the then-undefeated Broncos as the team remained winless. When Chandler went down with an injury in late October, coach Dan Reeves chose to start Tony Graziani. Shortly afterwards, Tolliver was released by the Falcons.

=== Kansas City Chiefs ===
In early November, Kansas City Chiefs quarterback Elvis Grbac was lost for the season due to a broken collarbone. As a result, the Chiefs signed Tolliver to a two-year contract as the third-string quarterback to replace him. Tolliver finished the season having completed 64 passes in 116 attempts for 677 yards, five touchdowns, and one interception. Only one of the 116 attempts came as a Kansas City quarterback. The 1998 preseason began with Tolliver competing with Pat Barnes for the third-string quarterback job, but this ended when Tolliver was released by the Chiefs in August.

=== New Orleans Saints ===
After Saints quarterback Billy Joe Hobert was lost for the season with a ruptured Achilles tendon, the Saints signed Tolliver to a two-year deal. After four starts by Danny Wuerffel, Saints coach Mike Ditka gave Tolliver the start against the Atlanta Falcons. After starting for four weeks and having a few impressive performances, Tolliver was benched in favor of Kerry Collins, who finished the season as starting quarterback. Tolliver finished the year with one of his most statistically impressive seasons, completing 110 of 199 passes for 1,427 yards, eight touchdowns, four interceptions, and finishing with a QB rating of 83.1.

Tolliver started the 1999 season as Hobert's backup. Hobert started the first four games but was injured, leaving Tolliver to start against the Tennessee Titans on October 17 and the Giants the week after. Hobert started the next game, but suffered a pinched nerve in his neck, resulting in Tolliver's third start of the season against the Tampa Bay Buccaneers. Against the 49ers, he scored the third and fourth rushing touchdowns of his career en route to a 24–6 win. However, the next week against the Jacksonville Jaguars, Tolliver suffered a torn MCL, and he was considered likely to miss the rest of the season. A couple of weeks later, Tolliver had bounced back from his injury by "treating himself with some WD-40" and was named the starter in the December 12 game against the St. Louis Rams. Tolliver was again injured the following week against the Baltimore Ravens, putting an end to his season, which he finished with a 51.9 completion percentage, 1,916 yards, seven touchdowns, 16 interceptions, and a QB rating of 58.9.

Throughout the 1999 season, Tolliver remained a vocal supporter of coach Ditka despite the Saints' 3–13 record, saying "I think he's a heck of a football coach, a great motivator. We just got to start buying what he's selling." Ditka was fired by the Saints, but as training camp for the 2000 season began, Tolliver was the Saints' backup quarterback behind Jeff Blake. On August 1, the Saints traded for quarterback Aaron Brooks, which left Tolliver to compete for the third-string spot alongside Jake Delhomme. The Saints' roster was reduced to 53 players, and Tolliver was among those cut. When the Saints lost Jeff Blake for the season in mid-November due to a dislocated foot, Tolliver was re-signed by the Saints, though he did not play a game that season.

=== Green Bay Packers ===
In July 2001, Tolliver was signed by the Green Bay Packers. This briefly reunited him with Brett Favre, with whom he was teammates in Atlanta. However, he was cut on August 21, 2001, when Doug Pederson won the backup job, and this stint marked the end of Tolliver's professional career.

== Personal life ==
Tolliver was named after his uncle Joe and aunt Billie. He and his wife, Sheila, have five children.

Tolliver is an avid golfer and has played many celebrity tournaments. He is a regular competitor at the American Century Championship in Lake Tahoe, the annual competition to determine the best golfers among American sports and entertainment celebrities. He won in 1996, when it was the Isuzu Celebrity Golf Challenge, in 2005, in 2010 (with a new point record of 84 points), and in 2013, and had a total of fourteen top-ten finishes as of the 2019 tournament.
