= Bishop Airport (Decatur, Texas) =

- IATA: none; ICAO: none; FAA LID: 76T

Summary
- Airport type: Public
- Owner: Tom Bishop
- Serves: Decatur, Texas
- Elevation AMSL: 875 ft (267 m)
- Coordinates: 33°15′59″N 097°27′06″W

Map
- Location within Texas

Runways
Direction	Length		Surface
Direction	ft	m	Surface
17/35	3,730	1,137	Turf

Statistics (2008)
- Aircraft operations: 300
- Source: Federal Aviation Administration

Bishop Airport (FAA LID: 76T) is a privately owned public-use airport located six nautical miles (6.9 mi; 11 km) east of the central business district of Decatur, a city in Wise County, Texas, United States.

== Facilities and aircraft ==
Bishop Airport has one runway designated 17/35 with a turf surface measuring 3,730 by 170 feet (1,137 by 52 m). For the 12-month period ending September 3, 2008, the airport had 300 general aviation aircraft operations, an average of 25 per month.

== See also ==
- List of airports in Texas
