= Springtown Independent School District =

School district in Texas

Springtown Independent School District is a public school district based in Springtown, Texas (USA) in the Dallas/Fort Worth Metroplex.

Located in Parker County, a small portion of the district extends into Wise County.

The school mascot (dating back to the mid-1920s) is the porcupine (which is not native to the area). The Term POJO comes from a meeting in Spring 1983, with new head football coach, Lucky Gamble, and a small group of senior and junior football players. In that meeting the group decided they needed a new culture to go along with the new coach and they decided to adopt POJO, a derivative of Odessa Permian's MOJO as a spirit word for the team. The school mascot is nicknamed "POJO."

In 2009, the school district was listed as a "Recognized" district by the Texas Education Agency.

== Operations ==
In September 2012 the board of the district voted to allow an administrator giving a school punishment paddling of a student to be of the opposite sex of the student; the school district said this is because of a lack of female administrators. This occurred after an incident where a male assistant principal gave a school-sanctioned paddling to two female students, and some parents said that the paddling resulted in bruises.

The paddling was against the school's own policy as the paddling was supposed to be done by someone of the same sex. In 2012 the policy was changed; parents have to opt into corporal punishment and they may choose which gender administrator may deliver it. The new policy allows female administrators to spank male students.

== Schools ==
Reno Elementary School

Springtown Elementary School

Goshen Creek Elementary School

Springtown Intermediate School

Springtown Middle School

Springtown High School
