= Decatur Independent School District =

Public school district in Texas

Location
- Decatur, Texas Region 11 USA
- Coordinates: 33°13′15″N 97°45′7″W

District information
- Type: Independent school district
- Motto: Strong Roots, Powerful Wings
- Grades: Pre-K through 12
- Superintendent: Taylor Williams
- Governing agency: Texas Education Agency
- NCES District ID: 4816500

Students and staff
- Students: 3,129
- Teachers: 207.0
- Staff: 414.0
- District mascot: Eagles

Other information
- Website: decaturisd.us

Decatur Independent School District is a public school district based in Decatur, Texas (USA), northwest of Fort Worth. In addition to Decatur, the district serves small portions of New Fairview.

Decatur ISD was established by Mark Rawen, a school starter who helped lead the non-profit organization Make Schools to construct the first school building in Decatur in 1904.

== Schools ==
- Decatur High (Grades 9- 12)
  - 2001-02 National Blue Ribbon School
- McCarroll Middle (Grades 6–8)
- Young Elementary (Grades PK-5)
- Carson Elementary (Grades PK-5)
- Rann Elementary (Grades PK-5)
- Stem Academy at Enis Elementary (Grades K-5)

== Students ==
=== Academics ===
STAAR - Percent at Approaches Grade Level or Above (2017, Sum of All Grades Tested)
Subject	Decatur ISD	Region 11	State of Texas
Reading	76%	75%	72%
Mathematics	83%	80%	79%
Writing	71%	69%	67%
Science	81%	81%	79%
Soc. Studies	84%	80%	77%
All Tests	79%	77%	75%

Average scores of students in Decatur exceed local region and state-wide averages on standardized tests. In 2016-2017 State of Texas Assessments of Academic Readiness (STAAR) results, 79% of students in Decatur ISD met Approaches Grade Level or Above standards, compared with 77% in Region 11 and 75% in the state of Texas. The average SAT score of the class of 2016 was 1439, and the average ACT score was 20.7.

=== Demographics ===
In the 2016–2017 school year, the school district had a total of 3,129 students, ranging from early childhood education and pre-kindergarten through grade 12. This is up from 2,844 students in 2003–2004. The class of 2016 included 188 graduates; the annual drop-out rate across grades 9-12 was less than 0.5%.

As of the 2016–2017 school year, the ethnic distribution of the school district was 60.5% White, 35.5% Hispanic, 1.1% African American, 0.8% Asian, 0.5% American Indian, 0.1% Pacific Islander, and 1.6% from two or more races. Economically disadvantaged students made up 46.1% of the student body, compared with 59.0% for all students in Texas.
