= Texas Educational Assessment of Minimum Skills =

American high school tests, 1984–1990

The Texas Educational Assessment of Minimum Skills or TEAMS was the second standardized test used in Texas, from 1984 until 1990. It was used for grades 1, 3, 5, 7, 9 and 11. Students passing the test are no longer needed to take the exam. Passing the Grade 11, or Exit level, examination was required for graduation, but many opportunities for retesting were available. The TEAMS exam was replaced by the Texas Assessment of Academic Skills (TAAS) in 1990.

== See also ==
- Texas Assessment of Basic Skills - the first standardized test used by Texas from 1980 until 1983.
- Texas Assessment of Academic Skills - the third standardized test used by Texas from 1991 until 2002.
- Texas Assessment of Knowledge and Skills - the fourth standardized test used by Texas from 2003 until 2011.
- State of Texas Assessments of Academic Readiness - the fifth and current standardized test used by Texas since 2011.
