= Texas Tourist Camp =

- U.S. National Register of Historic Places
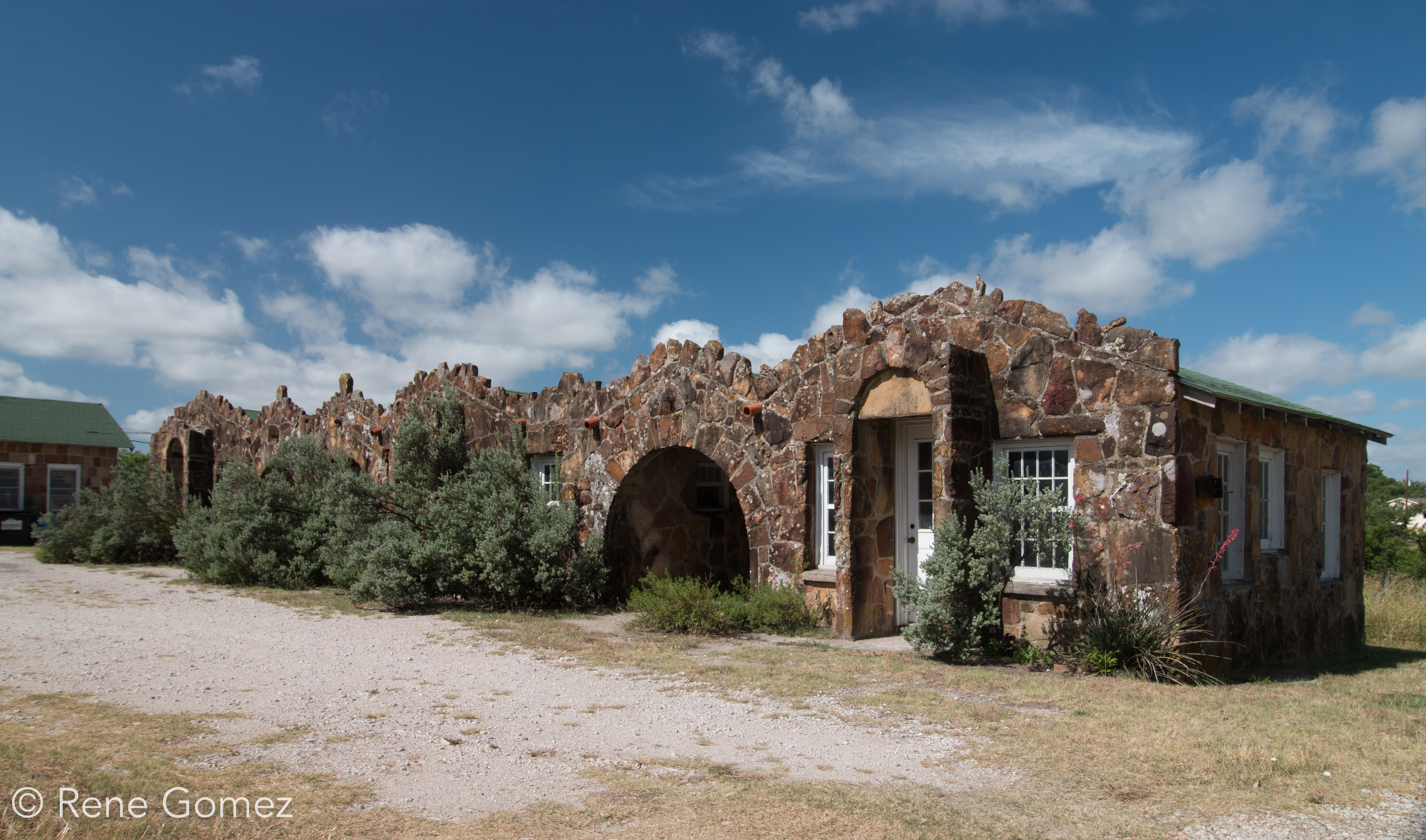
- Texas Tourist Camp (2018)

- Location within Texas Location within the United States
- Location: 900-904 S U.S. Route 287, Decatur, Texas
- Coordinates: 33°13′42″N 97°34′43″W
- Built: 1927
- Architect: E.F. Boydston
- NRHP reference No.: 97000477
- Added to NRHP: May 30, 1997

The Texas Tourist Camp is a historic tourist camp in Decatur, Texas. It is listed on the National Register of Historic Places.

== History ==
Emmet Franklin Boydston (2 December 1888 – 18 August 1945) was a local businessman, the son of George Washington Boydston and Eliza Jane Carter. In 1927, Boydston purchased the former feed lot for $400 with the intention of offering services to travelers. The original site consisted of a gas station and a wooden shed with travelers using the sight to camp overnight. The camp was expanded in 1931 when Boydston built three wooden cabins, he expanded further in 1935 and the cabins were faced with rockwork. The Boydston family continued to operate on the site until 1988. The site was brought back into the family in recent years, with Nancy Rosendahl, the granddaughter of Emmet Franklin Boydston owning the site.

== See also ==
- National Register of Historic Places listings in Wise County, Texas
