= National Register of Historic Places listings in Wise County, Texas =

Location of Wise County in Texas

This is a list of the National Register of Historic Places listings in Wise County, Texas.

This is intended to be a complete list of properties listed on the National Register of Historic Places in Wise County, Texas. There are six properties listed on the National Register in the county. Four properties are Recorded Texas Historic Landmarks including one that is also a State Antiquities Landmark.

This National Park Service list is complete through NPS recent listings posted March 21, 2025.

== Current listings ==
The locations of National Register properties may be seen in a mapping service provided.

| | Name on the Register | Image | Date listed | Location | City or town | Description |
|---|---|---|---|---|---|---|
| 1 | Administration Building, Decatur Baptist College | Administration Building, Decatur Baptist College | March 11, 1971 (#71000973) | 1602 S. Trinity St. 33°13′22″N 97°35′11″W | Decatur | Recorded Texas Historic Landmark |
| 2 | Bridgeport Commercial Historic District | | November 29, 2024 (#100011085) | Halsell Street, roughly between 9th Street and 12th Street; 33°12′37″N 97°45′29″W | Bridgeport | |
| 3 | J. T. Brown Hotel | J. T. Brown Hotel | October 16, 1979 (#79003026) | E. Decatur St; 33°17′38″N 97°47′44″W | Chico | |
| 4 | Texas Tourist Camp | Texas Tourist Camp | May 30, 1997 (#97000477) | 900-904 S US 81/287; 33°13′42″N 97°34′44″W | Decatur | Recorded Texas Historic Landmark |
| 5 | Waggoner Mansion | Waggoner Mansion | May 1, 1974 (#74002098) | 1003 E. Main; 33°14′03″N 97°34′37″W | Decatur | Recorded Texas Historic Landmark |
| 6 | Wise County Courthouse | Wise County Courthouse | December 12, 1976 (#76002085) | Public Sq. 33°14′03″N 97°35′13″W | Decatur | State Antiquities Landmark, Recorded Texas Historic Landmark; designed by James Riely Gordon |

== See also ==
- National Register of Historic Places listings in Texas
- Recorded Texas Historic Landmarks in Wise County
