= Administration Building, Decatur Baptist College =

- U.S. National Register of Historic Places
- Recorded Texas Historic Landmark
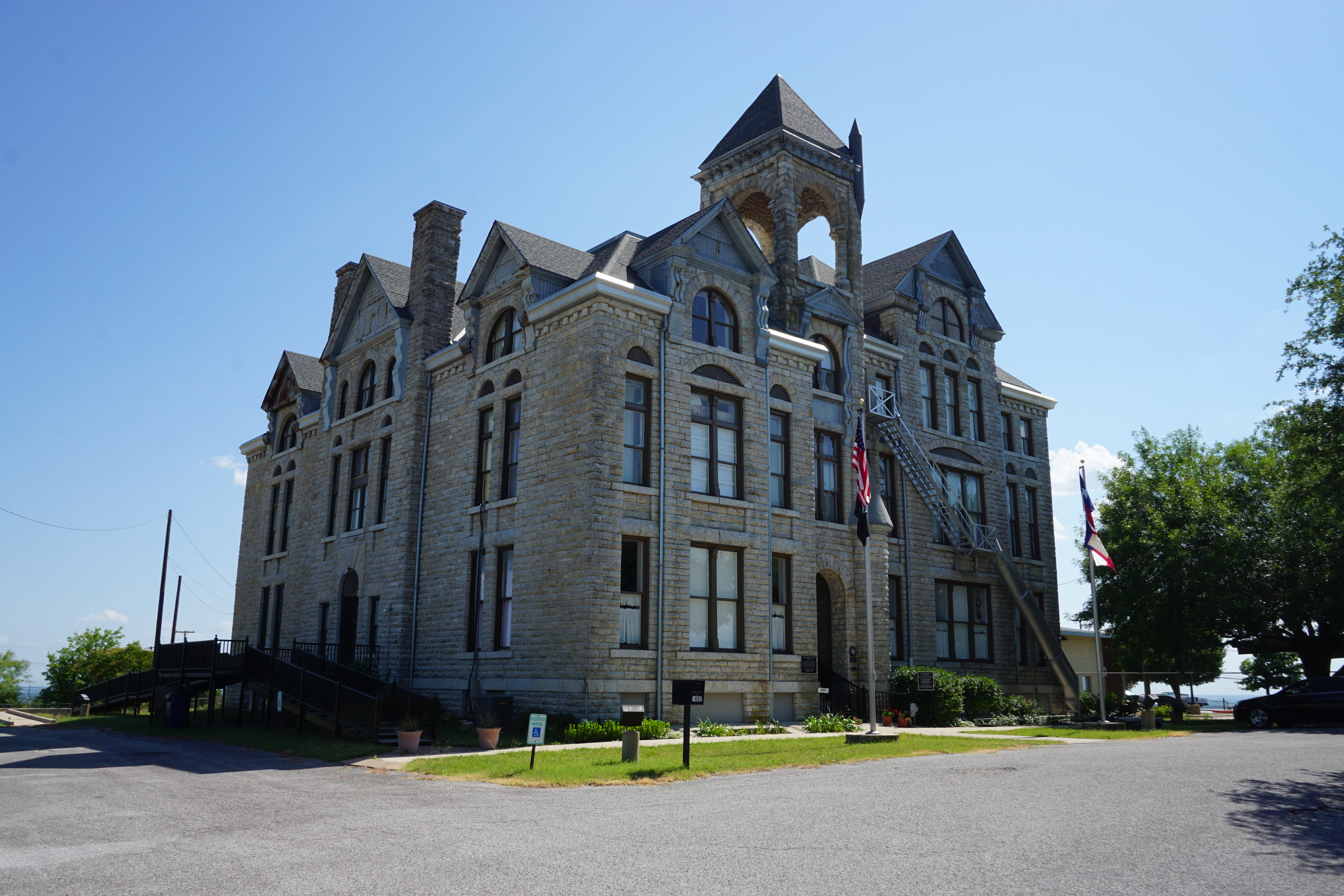
- Administration Building, Decatur Baptist College in 2018

- Location within Texas Location within the United States
- Location: 1602 S. Trinity St., Decatur, Texas
- Coordinates: 33°13′22″N 97°35′11″W
- Area: 0.4 acres (0.16 ha)
- Built: 1893
- NRHP reference No.: 71000973
- RTHL No.: 1197

Significant dates
- Added to NRHP: March 11, 1971
- Designated RTHL: 1964

The Administration Building, Decatur Baptist College, at 1602 S. Trinity St. in Decatur, Texas, and overlooking the town, was built in 1893. It was listed on the National Register of Historic Places in 1971. The building was destroyed in a fire on March 18, 2023.

It was a historic building of the Decatur Baptist College, which was founded in 1891 and which held classes during 1892–93 in an opera house space above a grocery store in Decatur. After the building was completed in 1893, it had 149 enrolled students and eight faculty in the 1893–94 school year. The college went bankrupt in 1896, and reorganized as Decatur Baptist Junior College, the first private junior college in the U.S. Much later it moved to Dallas in 1964 and became Dallas Baptist College.

It was a three-story limestone building. It included 15 rooms and a chapel.

On March 18, 2023, the building, which houses the Wise County Heritage Museum, was completely destroyed in a blaze shortly after midnight along with many artifacts being lost.

== See also ==
- National Register of Historic Places listings in Wise County, Texas
- Recorded Texas Historic Landmarks in Wise County
