= Texas Assessment of Knowledge and Skills =

Former Texas state standardized test

The official logo of the TAKS test. Mainly based on the TAAS test's logo.

The Texas Assessment of Knowledge and Skills (TAKS) was the fourth Texas state standardized test previously used in grade 3-8 and grade 9-11 to assess students' attainment of reading, writing, math, science, and social studies skills required under Texas education standards. It is developed and scored by Pearson Educational Measurement with close supervision by the Texas Education Agency. Though created before the No Child Left Behind Act was passed, it complied with the law. It replaced the previous test, called the Texas Assessment of Academic Skills (TAAS), in 2002.

Those students being home-schooled or attending private schools were not required to take the TAKS test.

From 2012 to 2014, the test has been phased out and replaced by the State of Texas Assessments of Academic Readiness (STAAR) test in accordance with Texas Senate Bill 1031. All students who entered 9th grade prior to the 2011-2012 school year must still take the TAKS test; all students that entered high school in the 2011-2012 school year or later must switch to the STAAR test. Homeschoolers cannot take the STAAR; they can continue to take the TAKS test if desired.

== Test development ==
The Texas Education Agency, Pearson, and Texas educators collaborate to make TAKS. First, teachers reviewed the Texas Essential Knowledge and Skills (state-mandated curriculum) to determine the objectives to assess on each grade level. Then educators determined how the objectives could be best assessed and developed guidelines outlining eligible test content and test-item formats. TEA created a test blueprint. Each year Pearson develops test items based on the objectives and guidelines, and the TEA reviews those items. Teacher committees are brought to Austin to review the proposed test items, and finally the items are field-tested on Texas students. Using the input of the teacher committee and the results of field-testing, TEA and Pearson build the TAKS. A more detailed explanation is available from the Student Assessment Division of TEA.

== Scoring ==
The science, social studies, math, and reading tests (before grade 9) consist of multiple-choice questions scored by computer. On each test, a scaled score of 2100 is required to pass and 2400 is required to earn "commended" status. Performance standards showing the raw scores are available online.

The essay and short answer portions found in grade 4, 7, 9, 10, and 11 are scored by graders in Dallas, Austin, and Albuquerque. The graders are not all teachers, but Pearson requires its graders to have a bachelor's degree and prefers experience in education.

The written composition is graded on a scale of 0–4. Students must earn a score of 2 or better on their written composition in order to meet the standard in writing or ELA.

0	1	2	3	4
off topic	ineffective	somewhat effective	effective	highly effective

The open-ended items (short answer) are graded on a scale of 0–3.

0	1	2	3
insufficient	partially sufficient	sufficient	exemplary

The ELA (10th–11th grade) raw score is calculated as shown in this chart.

	Item value	No. of items	Points per section	Total
Multiple choice	1	48	48	
Open-ended	3	3	9	
Written composition	16	1	16	
				73

The 9th grade reading test raw score is calculated as shown in this chart.

	Item value	No. of items	Points per section	Total
Multiple choice	1	33	33	
Open-ended	3	3	9	
				42

The raw score for the 7th grade writing test is calculated as shown.

	Item value	No. of items	Points per section	Total
Multiple choice	1	40	40	
Written composition	4	1	4	
				44

The raw score for the 4th grade writing test is calculated as shown.

	Item value	No. of items	Points per section	Total
Multiple choice	1	28	28	
Written composition	4	1	4	
				32

Then, the raw score is converted to a scaled score. As with the other tests, a scaled score of 2100 meets the standard and 2400 is a commended performance. In 2007, the 11th grade "met standard" level was a raw score of 42, 10th was 44, and 9th was 28; 7th "met standard" with 26 points and 4th with 20. However, the points needed to meet the standard may change slightly from year to year depending on the test's level of difficulty, so all students should do their best and not aim for a particular numeric score.

The TAKS reading/ELA scale is linked with the Lexile Framework for Reading. Thus, Lexile measures are reported out for students in grades 3–11. A Lexile measure can be used to match readers with targeted text and monitor growth in reading ability.

== Graduation requirements ==
Texas high school seniors cannot graduate unless they pass exit-level TAKS tests in English language arts, social studies, math, and science. During their junior and senior years of high school, students are given five chances to pass the test.

Students new to Texas public education who enroll after January 1 of the school year in which they are otherwise eligible to graduate may use scores from the SAT or ACT to replace the ELA and Math TAKS. However, students are still required to pass the exit level science and social studies TAKS test as well as satisfy all coursework requirements in order to be eligible to receive a Texas high school diploma.

== Alternate assessments ==
In 2007, the TEA introduced TAKS (Accommodated), TAKS-M, and TAKS-Alt to assess students receiving special education services. Determination of the appropriate assessment is made by the ARD committee based on each individual student's instructional supports and current level of functioning. A brief description of each assessment can be found on page 19 of the ARD manual. TAKS (Accommodated) has fewer items per page, larger font size, and no field-test items, but still possesses the same content as standard TAKS. TAKS-M (modified) is adjusted to have a larger font size, fewer items per page, reduced number of answer choices, and embedded questions depending upon the subject being assessed. While the TAKS-M items use simplified wording, content is still assessed on grade level. Only 2% of students per district will be permissibly scored as "Proficient" using the TAKS-M. TAKS-Alt (alternative) has a 1% permissibility ceiling and is for students facing significant cognitive disabilities.

(Current as of March 2008)

== Controversies and changes ==
Former State Board of Education candidate Mark Loewe identified scoring mistakes made on questions of the Spring 2003 TAKS Mathematics and Science tests; two of the science questions were discussed in The New York Times. Incorrect scores were issued to more than 400,000 students. According to Loewe, the Texas Education Agency issued false statements about several of the mistakes and failed to correct any of the mistakes.

Also controversial is the mathematics section of the exit level test. This section of the test covers Algebra I, Geometry, and minimal use of basic skills, such as graphs, charts, and grids. The controversy lies in the fact that many students who take higher levels of mathematics seem to fail this test because it does not test their higher-level skills, instead testing skills that they have not recently studied. However, many in the educational community praise the test not for testing higher-level skills but for its assessment of critical thinking based on lower-level skills.

The TAKS test's grading standards have come under fire, as some deem them to be too easy. In addition, hundreds of schools throughout Texas have been investigated and audited by the Texas Education Association due to suspicious scoring discrepancies. Also, there is the issue with teachers teaching to the TAKS test, instead of the standard Texas curriculum.

In order to reduce the burden of field testing, the Texas State Board of Education has not released to the public those questions used to determine student scores on the Spring 2005 or Spring 2007 TAKS tests. Regrettably, this prevents public review of the questions and answers (for appropriateness and correctness) and denies opportunities for students, teachers, and others to learn from the tests. However, university-level experts in each of the fields review each high school-level test for accuracy. Grade-level teachers also review test items for appropriateness prior to field testing and review the field test results in order to select the best questions for inclusion in the test item bank.

== Transition to End-of-Course exams ==
With Senate Bill 1031 in spring 2007, Texas legislators repealed TAKS in favor of End of Course exams in high school; however, this change will happen gradually. Students who enter ninth grade in the 2011-2012 school year will have to take end-of-course exams in core subjects. Students who entered ninth grade before 2011 will still have to pass the exit-level TAKS to graduate. A calendar which shows the field test and implementation schedule has been developed.

According to the Texas Federation of Teachers, the EOC will require students taking either the Recommended or Advanced curriculum to take three end-of-course exams in each of four core subjects: English I, English II, English III; Algebra I, Algebra II, Geometry; Biology, Chemistry, Physics; World Geography, World History, U.S. History

In 2010, Texas Commissioner of Education Robert Scott announced a retooled version of the proposed EOC exams, called the State of Texas Assessments of Academic Readiness (STAAR). STAAR will be used for the 12 end-of-course assessments mandated by SB 1031 in 2007 and the new grade 3-8 assessments mandated by HB 3 in the 2009 legislative session.

In June 2013 TEA announced another change to the testing requirements as a result of HB 5. The five assessments required for graduation are Algebra I, English I (combined reading/writing), English II (combined reading/writing), biology, and U.S. history and the scores on the STAAR test were no longer calculated into a students final grade for the course.

The new tests will be used beginning in the 2011-2012 school year. Students in the graduating Class of 2015 will be the first students who must meet the end-of-course testing requirements, as well as pass their classes, in order to earn a diploma.

The new tests will be significantly more rigorous than previous tests and will measure a child’s performance, as well as academic growth.

The grade 3-8 STAAR tests in reading and mathematics, by law, must be linked from grade to grade to performance expectations for the English II and Algebra I end-of-course assessments.

During a speech at the Texas Association of School Administrators’ Midwinter Conference in Austin, Scott also said the last TAKS-based school accountability ratings will be issued in 2011. Ratings will be suspended in 2012 while a new accountability system is developed.

== See also ==
- Texas Assessment of Basic Skills - the first standardized test used by Texas from 1980 until 1983.
- Texas Educational Assessment of Minimum Skills - the second standardized test used by Texas from 1984 until 1990.
- Texas Assessment of Academic Skills - the third standardized test used by Texas from 1991 until 2002.
- State of Texas Assessments of Academic Readiness - the fifth and current standardized test used by Texas since 2011.
