= Chico Independent School District =

School district in Texas

Location
- Chico, TX Region 11 USA

District information
- Type: Public
- Grades: Pre-K through 12
- Governing agency: Texas Education Agency
- Budget: $8.86 million (2015-2016)
- NCES District ID: 4813800

Students and staff
- Students: 608 (2017-2018)
- Teachers: 45.46 (2017-2018)
- Staff: 87.21 (2017-2018)

Other information
- Website: http://www.chicoisdtx.net

Chico Independent School District is a public school district based in Chico, Texas (USA). The mascot of this school district is The Mighty Dragons.

In 2009, the school district was rated "academically acceptable" by the Texas Education Agency.

== History ==
The district changed to a four-day school week in fall 2022.

== Schools ==
- Chico High School (Grades 9–12)
- Chico Middle School (Grades 6–8)
- Chico Elementary School (Grades PK-5)

== Students ==
=== Academics ===
STAAR - Percent at Approaches Grade Level or Above (2017, Sum of All Grades Tested)
Subject	Chico ISD	Region 11	State of Texas
Reading	74%	75%	72%
Mathematics	80%	80%	79%
Writing	81%	69%	67%
Science	80%	81%	79%
Soc. Studies	66%	80%	77%
All Tests	77%	77%	75%

Average scores of students in Chico typically match local region and state-wide averages on standardized tests. In 2016-2017 State of Texas Assessments of Academic Readiness (STAAR) results, 77% of students in Chico ISD met Approaches Grade Level or Above standards, compared with 77% in Region 11 and 75% in the state of Texas. The average SAT score of the class of 2016 was 1303, and the average ACT score was 19.2.

=== Demographics ===
In the 2016–2017 school year, the school district had a total of 603 students, ranging from early childhood education and pre-kindergarten through grade 12. The class of 2016 included 52 graduates; the annual drop-out rate across grades 9-12 was less than 1%.

As of the 2016–2017 school year, the ethnic distribution of the school district was 68.7% White, 27.5% Hispanic, 0.7% African American, 0.5% American Indian, 0.2% Pacific Islander, 0% Asian, and 2.5% from two or more races. Economically disadvantaged students made up 58.4% of the student body, compared with 59.0% for all students in Texas.
