= Cottondale, Texas =

Unincorporated community in Texas, U.S.

Coordinates: 33°03′57″N 97°42′17″W

- Unincorporated community
- Interactive map of Cottondale, Texas
- Map showing Cottondale in Texas Cottondale, Texas (the United States)
- Country: United States
- State: Texas
- County: Wise
- Time zone: UTC-6 (Central (CST))
  - Summer (DST): UTC-5 (CDT)
- ZIP code: 76073
- Area code: 940

Cottondale is an unincorporated community in Wise County, in the U.S. state of Texas. The area is loosely located in the Dallas-Fort Worth Metroplex.

== History ==
The area would gain its name from a cotton crop of John Thomas Bridges, a native of Alabama who had settled in Wise County. A post office was established in 1875, and it was discontinued in 1912.

== Cottondale in Popular Culture ==
The American Gangster Machine Gun Kelly would pass away of a heart attack at Leavenworth Prison on July 17, 1954 in Leavenworth, Kansas, and was buried in the Cottondale Cemetery.
