= Texas Essential Knowledge and Skills =

Texas Essential Knowledge and Skills (TEKS) are the state standards for the US state of Texas public schools from kindergarten to year 12. They detail the curriculum requirements for every course. State-mandated standardized tests measure acquisition of specific knowledge and skills outlined in this curriculum. It is also used in international schools outside of Texas. The TEKS are taught to students and within the end of the year, they take a standardized test based on the TEKS called the State of Texas Assessments of Academic Readiness.

== Standards ==
Standards are created and agreed upon by the State Board of Education (SBOE) which is the legislative organization that forms the committee to review the TEKS. The committee consists of members nominate educators, parents, business and industry representatives, and employers.
