= Phil Ryan (sheriff) =

American Texas Ranger (1945–2026)

- Born: August 10, 1945; Oklahoma, U.S.
- Died: February 25, 2026 (aged 80); Decatur, Texas, U.S.
- Political party: Democrat
- Children: 3
- Police career
- Country: United States
- Department: Texas Rangers; Wise County Sheriff
- Service years: 1966–2007
- Awards: TXDPS Purple Heart (2 awards)
- Other work: Private security consultant

Phillip R. Ryan (August 10, 1945 – February 25, 2026) was an American Texas Ranger and the three-term sheriff of Wise County, Texas. He entered law enforcement in 1966 at the age of 21, initially serving as a police officer in Pasadena in Harris County, Texas. He later joined the Texas Department of Public Safety as a highway patrolman assigned to Houston and Cleveland, Texas. In 1976, he was promoted to highway patrol sergeant, which took him to Humble, Texas. He applied for and was accepted to service in the Texas Ranger Division and served as a Ranger in Decatur, which also covered Jack, Montague, and Clay counties.

As a Texas Ranger, Ryan worked many cases that made him well known not only throughout the state, but throughout the nation. He is most notable for his arrest of serial killer Henry Lee Lucas, but also was the Texas Ranger assigned to the Ricky Lee and Sharon Green case, two of the most notorious serial killers in Wise County, Texas history.

== Wise County Sheriff ==
After retiring from law enforcement, Ryan entered the private sector, but this would only last for a short time. In 1992, Ryan began his campaign for Wise County Sheriff, running on the Democratic ballot. On March 20, 1992, he took his oath of office for the first of three terms as sheriff. Under his leadership, the department instituted a new crime prevention division, implemented a county-wide Crime Stoppers program, and improved information technology.

== Walker, Texas Ranger ==
Ryan was a technical consultant to the CBS television series, Walker, Texas Ranger, starring Chuck Norris. He briefly appeared in Little Texas' "God Blessed Texas" video with two other Texas Rangers. He also appeared extensively in the 1995 documentary film, The Serial Killers and the 1995 television documentary Henry Lee Lucas: The Confession Killer.

== Personal life and death ==
Ryan was married four times. He had three children from his first marriage, Phillip Ryan Jr., a police officer in East Texas and former Texas death row prison guard, Ronda Ryan Schweiger of Decatur, Texas, and Daryle Ryan, a former San Antonio police officer. During his retirement in Decatur, he was a security consultant to private businesses. He died on February 25, 2026, at the age of 80, from heart disease.
