= Boyd High School (Texas) =

Coordinates: 33.0739°N 97.5756°W

Location
- 700 Knox Ave; Boyd, Texas 76023; United States

Information
- School type: Public high school
- School district: Boyd Independent School District
- Principal: Chelsea Reeves
- Staff: 35.78 (on an FTE basis)
- Grades: 9-12
- Enrollment: 385 (2023–2024)
- Student to teacher ratio: 10.76
- Colors: Green & Gold
- Athletics conference: UIL Class 3A
- Mascot: Yellowjacket
- Website: Official website

Boyd High School is a public high school located in Boyd, Texas, United States. It is part of the Boyd Independent School District located in southeastern Wise County and classified as a 3A school by the University Interscholastic League (UIL). In 2017, the school was rated "Met Standard" by the Texas Education Agency.

== Athletics ==
The Boyd Yellow Jackets compete in the following sports:

Volleyball, Football, Basketball, Softball, Baseball, Track, Tennis & Golf

=== State titles ===
- Baseball
  - 2023(3A), 2026(3A/D1)
- Football
  - 1983(2A), 2004(2A)
- Volleyball
  - 2025(3A/D2)

== Notable alumni ==
- Tyrese Robinson (2017), NFL offensive lineman for the Minnesota Vikings
- Ethan Wesloski (2022), college football linebacker for the Oklahoma State Cowboys
