= Texas Assessment of Basic Skills =

Standardized test in Texas, United States

The Texas Assessment of Basic Skills or TABS test was a standardized test for public schools in the State of Texas beginning in 1980. It was introduced by statute by the 66th Legislature in 1979. The statute required testing of "basic skills competencies in mathematics, reading, and writing for grades 3, 5, and 9."

== See also ==
- Texas Educational Assessment of Minimum Skills - the second standardized test used by Texas from 1984 until 1990.
- Texas Assessment of Academic Skills - the third standardized test used by Texas from 1991 until 2002.
- Texas Assessment of Knowledge and Skills - the fourth standardized test used by Texas from 2003 until 2011.
- State of Texas Assessments of Academic Readiness - the fifth and current standardized test used by Texas since 2011.
