= Alvord Independent School District =

School district in Texas

- Alvord ISD's location in the DFW Metroplex.

Location
- 100 Mosley Ln. Alvord, Texas ESC Region 11 USA
- Coordinates: 33°21′38.9″N 97°41′59.9″W

District information
- Type: Independent school district
- Grades: Pre-K through 12
- Superintendent: Dr. Randy Brown
- Schools: 3 (2009-10)
- NCES District ID: 4808100

Students and staff
- Students: 742 (2010-11)
- Teachers: 60.85 (2009-10) (on full-time equivalent (FTE) basis)
- Student–teacher ratio: 11.85 (2009-10)

Other information
- TEA District Accountability Rating for 2011-12: Recognized
- Website: Alvord ISD

Alvord Independent School District is a public school district based in Alvord, Texas (USA). The district is located in north central Wise County and extends into a small portion of southern Montague County. The district operates one high school, Alvord High School.

== Finances ==
As of the 2010–2011 school year, the appraised valuation of property in the district was $299,580,000. The maintenance tax rate was $0.117 and the bond tax rate was $0.019 per $100 of appraised valuation.

== Academic achievement ==
In 2011, the school district was rated "recognized" by the Texas Education Agency. Thirty-five percent of districts in Texas in 2011 received the same rating. No state accountability ratings will be given to districts in 2012. A school district in Texas can receive one of four possible rankings from the Texas Education Agency: Exemplary (the highest possible ranking), Recognized, Academically Acceptable, and Academically Unacceptable (the lowest possible ranking).

Historical district TEA accountability ratings

- 2011: Recognized
- 2010: Recognized
- 2009: Exemplary
- 2008: Recognized
- 2007: Recognized
- 2006: Recognized
- 2005: Recognized
- 2004: Recognized

== Schools ==
In the 2011–2012 school year, the district had students in three schools.

- Alvord High School (grades 9–12)
  - A new band hall was completed in the winter of 2008 which is attached to the westernmost end of the school.
- Alvord Middle School (grades 6–8)
  - The middle school was moved into in the fall of 2009.
- Alvord Elementary School (grades PK-5)
  - Up until 2008, Alvord Elementary did not have pre-school.

== See also ==
- List of school districts in Texas
- List of high schools in Texas
