= Texas Assessment of Academic Skills =

Standardized test used in Texas, United States

The TAAS, or Texas Assessment of Academic Skills, was the third standardized test used in Texas between 1991 and 2002, when it was replaced by the TAKS test from 2003 to 2013. It was used from grades 3, 5, 7, 9, and 11. Passing the Grade 11 level was required for graduation, but many opportunities for retesting were available. The implementation of the TAAS was the first time a state-mandated exam was required to be passed for graduation. There were many alternative routes available for students unable to pass the TAAS.

The TAAS tested 3 areas of proficiency: reading, writing, and math. The math and reading sections consisted of multiple-choice, while the writing section consisted of a series of prompts for which essays had to be written.

In 2002, researchers Jere Confrey and David Carrejo presented a paper that criticized the TAAS. They found that the "data provided to teachers for instructional decision-making" did not always reconcile with "published test structure".

== See also ==
- Texas Assessment of Basic Skills - the first standardized test used by Texas from 1980 until 1983.
- Texas Educational Assessment of Minimum Skills - the second standardized test used by Texas from 1984 until 1990.
- Texas Assessment of Knowledge and Skills - the fourth standardized test used by Texas from 2003 until 2011.
- State of Texas Assessments of Academic Readiness - the fifth and current standardized test used by Texas since 2011.
