= Wise County Courthouse (Texas) =

- U.S. National Register of Historic Places
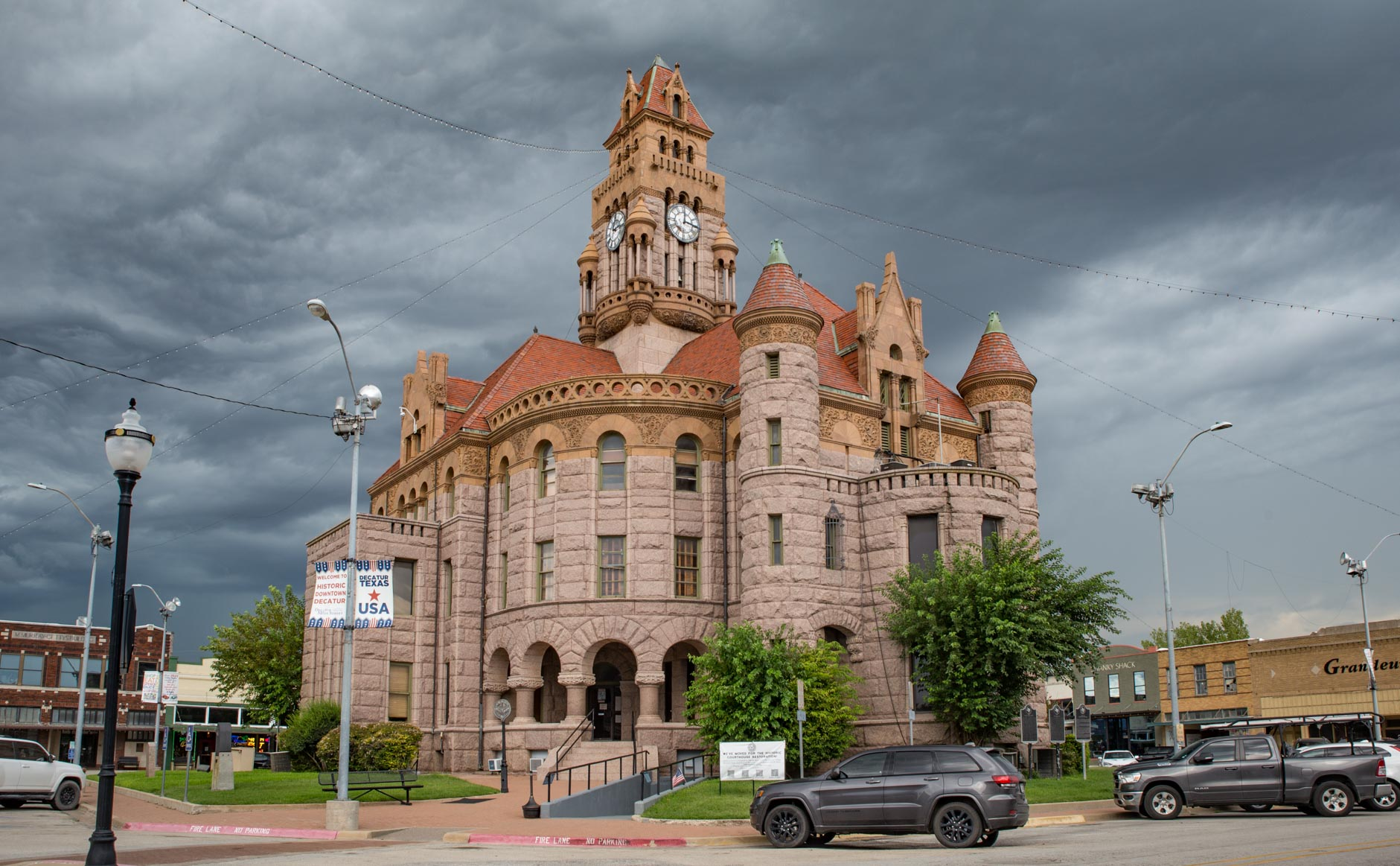
- Wise County Courthouse (2022)

- Location within Texas Location within the United States
- Interactive map showing the location of Wise County Courthouse
- Location: 101 N Trinity St., Decatur, Texas
- Coordinates: 33°14′04″N 97°35′13″W
- Built: 1896
- Architect: James Riely Gordon
- Architectural style: Romanesque
- NRHP reference No.: 76002085
- Added to NRHP: December 12, 1976

The Wise County Courthouse is a historic courthouse in Decatur, Texas. It is listed on the National Register of Historic Places.

== History ==
The courthouse was designed by James Reily Gordon, and was constructed in 1896. It was added to the National Register of Historic Places in 1976, and designated a Texas Historic Landmark in 1964.

== See also ==
- National Register of Historic Places listings in Wise County, Texas
