= Chico, Texas =

- Town
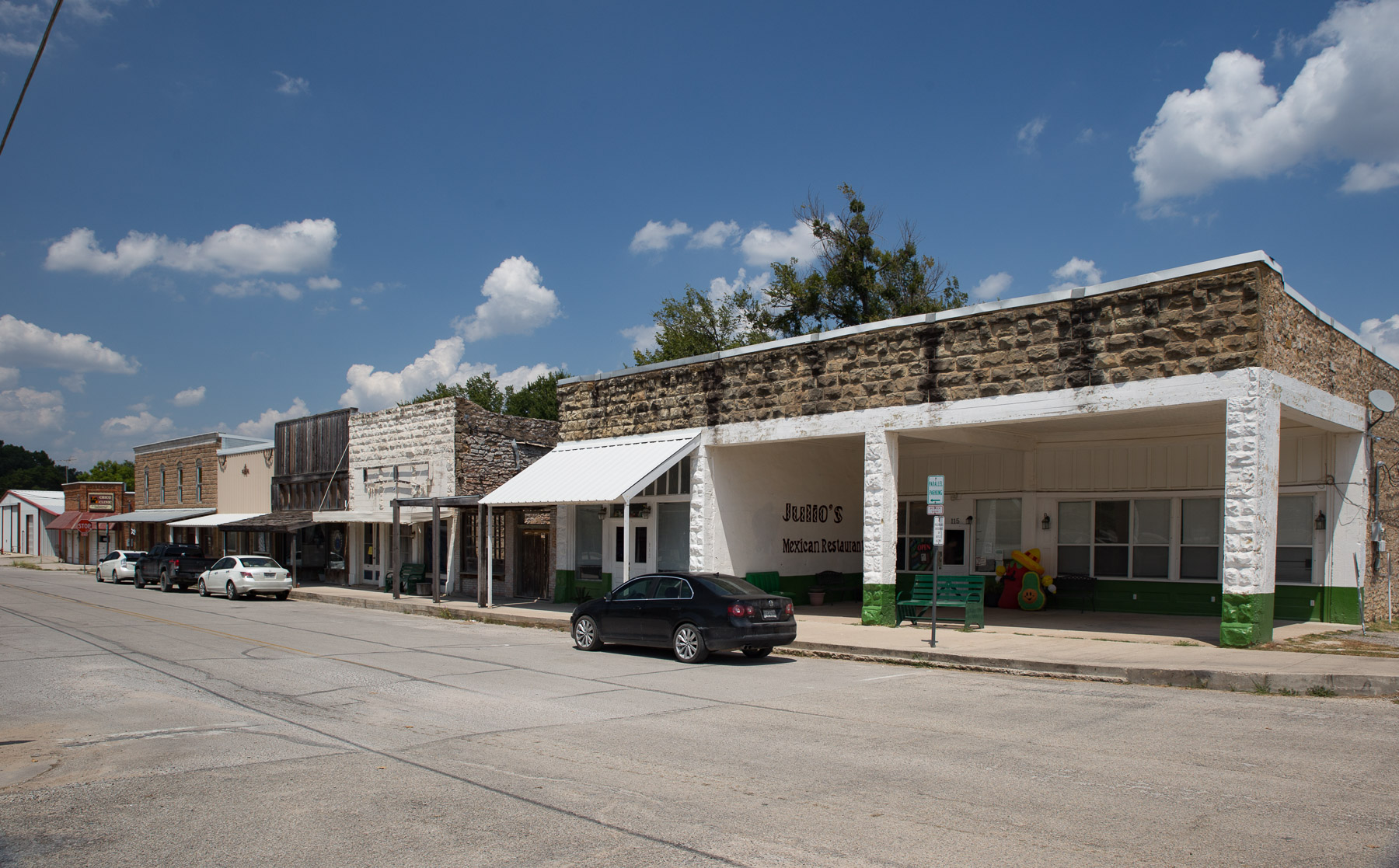

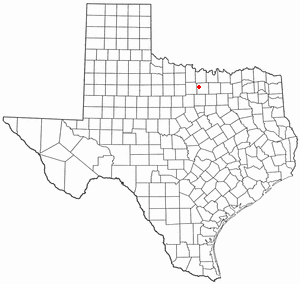
- Location of Chico, Texas

- Coordinates: 33°17′46″N 97°47′55″W
- Country: United States
- State: Texas
- County: Wise

Area
  - Total: 1.5 sq mi (3.9 km^{2})
  - Land: 1.5 sq mi (3.9 km^{2})
  - Water: 0.0 sq mi (0 km^{2})
- Elevation: 922 ft (281 m)

Population (2020)
  - Total: 946
  - Density: 630/sq mi (240/km^{2})
- Time zone: UTC-6 (Central (CST))
  - Summer (DST): UTC-5 (CDT)
- ZIP code: 76431
- Area code: 940
- FIPS code: 48-14620
- GNIS feature ID: 2409448
- Website: www.chico.texas.gov

Chico is a town in Wise County, Texas, United States. The population was 946 in 2020.

== Geography ==
According to the United States Census Bureau, the city has a total area of 1.5 square miles (3.9 km^{2}), all land.

== Demographics ==
Historical population
Census	Pop.	Note	%±
1880	292		—
1890	323		10.6%
1960	654		—
1970	723		10.6%
1980	890		23.1%
1990	800		−10.1%
2000	947		18.4%
2010	1,002		5.8%
2020	946		−5.6%
U.S. Decennial Census

=== 2020 census ===
As of the 2020 census, Chico had a population of 946 residents and 258 families, with a median age of 36.1 years. 24.9% of residents were under the age of 18 and 12.6% of residents were 65 years of age or older. For every 100 females there were 93.9 males, and for every 100 females age 18 and over there were 92.4 males age 18 and over.

0% of residents lived in urban areas, while 100.0% lived in rural areas.

There were 342 households in Chico, of which 40.1% had children under the age of 18 living in them. Of all households, 49.4% were married-couple households, 17.5% were households with a male householder and no spouse or partner present, and 24.0% were households with a female householder and no spouse or partner present. About 19.3% of all households were made up of individuals and 6.7% had someone living alone who was 65 years of age or older.

There were 406 housing units, of which 15.8% were vacant. Among occupied housing units, 64.3% were owner-occupied and 35.7% were renter-occupied. The homeowner vacancy rate was 3.0% and the rental vacancy rate was 17.3%.

Racial composition as of the 2020 census
Race	Percent
White	84.4%
Black or African American	0.5%
American Indian and Alaska Native	0.8%
Asian	0.2%
Native Hawaiian and Other Pacific Islander	0%
Some other race	6.7%
Two or more races	7.4%
Hispanic or Latino (of any race)	17.8%

Chico racial composition as of 2020 (NH = Non-Hispanic) (Note: Note: the US Census treats Hispanic/Latino as an ethnic category. This table excludes Latinos from the racial categories and assigns them to a separate category. Hispanics/Latinos can be of any race.)
Race	Number	Percentage
White (NH)	735	77.7%
Black or African American (NH)	5	0.53%
Native American or Alaska Native (NH)	6	0.63%
Asian (NH)	2	0.21%
Mixed/Multi-Racial (NH)	30	3.17%
Hispanic or Latino	168	17.76%
Total	946	

== Education ==
The city of Chico is served by the Chico Independent School District.
