= Boyd Independent School District =

School district in Texas

Location
- 500 Knox Ave. Boyd, Texas ESC Region 11 USA
- Coordinates: 33°4′31″N 97°34′23″W

District information
- Type: Independent school district
- Grades: Pre-K through 12
- Superintendent: Ted West
- Schools: 4 (2009-10)
- NCES District ID: 4811010

Students and staff
- Students: 1,114 (2010-11)
- Teachers: 87.40 (2009-10) (on full-time equivalent (FTE) basis)
- Student–teacher ratio: 11.81 (2009-10)
- Athletic conference: UIL Class 2A Football Division I
- District mascot: Yellowjackets
- Colors: Green, Gold

Other information
- TEA District Accountability Rating for 2011-12: Academically Acceptable
- Website: Boyd ISD

Boyd Independent School District is a public school district based in Boyd, Texas (USA). In addition to Boyd, the district also serves a portion of the Briar community.

== Finances ==
As of the 2010–2011 school year, the appraised valuation of property in the district was $825,918,000. The maintenance tax rate was $0.104 and the bond tax rate was $0.020 per $100 of appraised valuation.

== Academic achievement ==
In 2011, the school district was rated "academically acceptable" by the Texas Education Agency. Forty-nine percent of districts in Texas in 2011 received the same rating. No state accountability ratings will be given to districts in 2012. A school district in Texas can receive one of four possible rankings from the Texas Education Agency: Exemplary (the highest possible ranking), Recognized, Academically Acceptable, and Academically Unacceptable (the lowest possible ranking).

Historical district TEA accountability ratings

- 2011: Academically Acceptable
- 2010: Recognized
- 2009: Recognized
- 2008: Academically Acceptable
- 2007: Academically Acceptable
- 2006: Academically Acceptable
- 2005: Academically Acceptable
- 2004: Recognized

== Schools ==
In the 2011–2012 school year, the district operated four schools.

- Boyd High (Grades 9-12)
- Boyd Middle (Grades 7-8)
- Boyd Intermediate (Grades 4-6)
- Boyd Elementary (Grades PK-3)

== Special programs ==
=== Athletics ===
Boyd School participates in the boys sports of baseball, basketball, football, and tennis. The school participates in the girls sports of basketball, softball, tennis, and volleyball. For the 2012 through 2014 school years, Boyd High School will play football in UIL Class 2A Division I.

== See also ==
- List of school districts in Texas
- List of high schools in Texas
