= Decatur, Texas =

- City
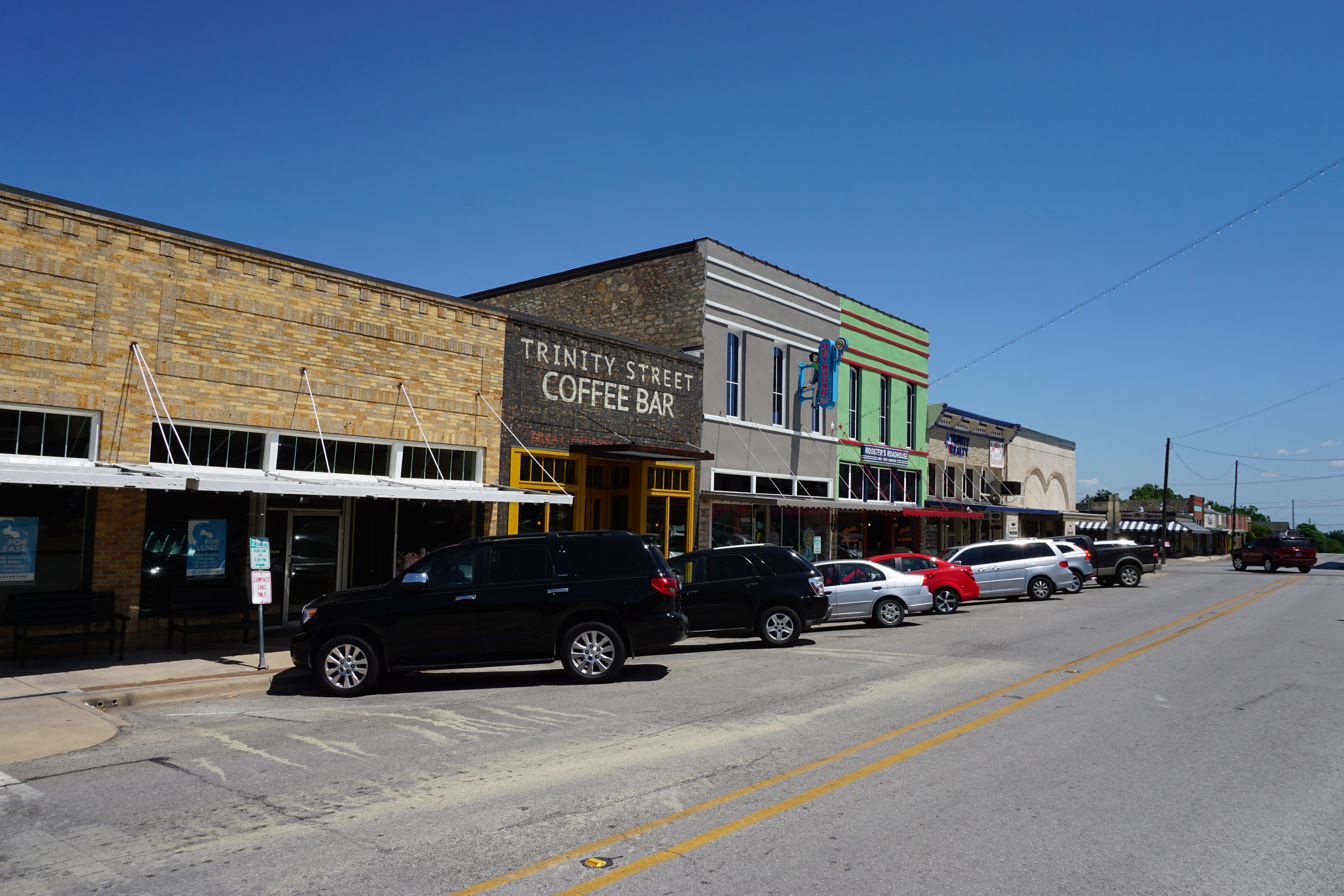
- Downtown Decatur
- Nickname: Little D
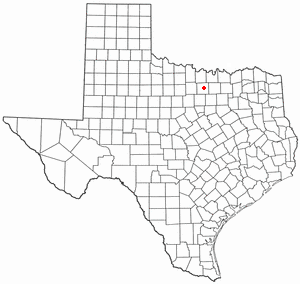
- Location of Decatur, Texas

- Coordinates: 33°13′40″N 97°35′04″W
- Country: United States
- State: Texas
- County: Wise

Area
  - Total: 8.78 sq mi (22.75 km^{2})
  - Land: 8.78 sq mi (22.75 km^{2})
  - Water: 0 sq mi (0.00 km^{2})
- Elevation: 1,004 ft (306 m)

Population (2020)
  - Total: 6,538
  - Density: 744.3/sq mi (287.4/km^{2})
- Time zone: UTC-6 (Central (CST))
  - Summer (DST): UTC-5 (CDT)
- ZIP code: 76234
- Area code: 940
- FIPS code: 48-19528
- GNIS feature ID: 2410307
- Website: http://www.decaturtx.org/

Decatur is a city in and the county seat of Wise County, Texas, United States. Part of the Dallas metropolitan area, it had a population of 6,538 in 2020.

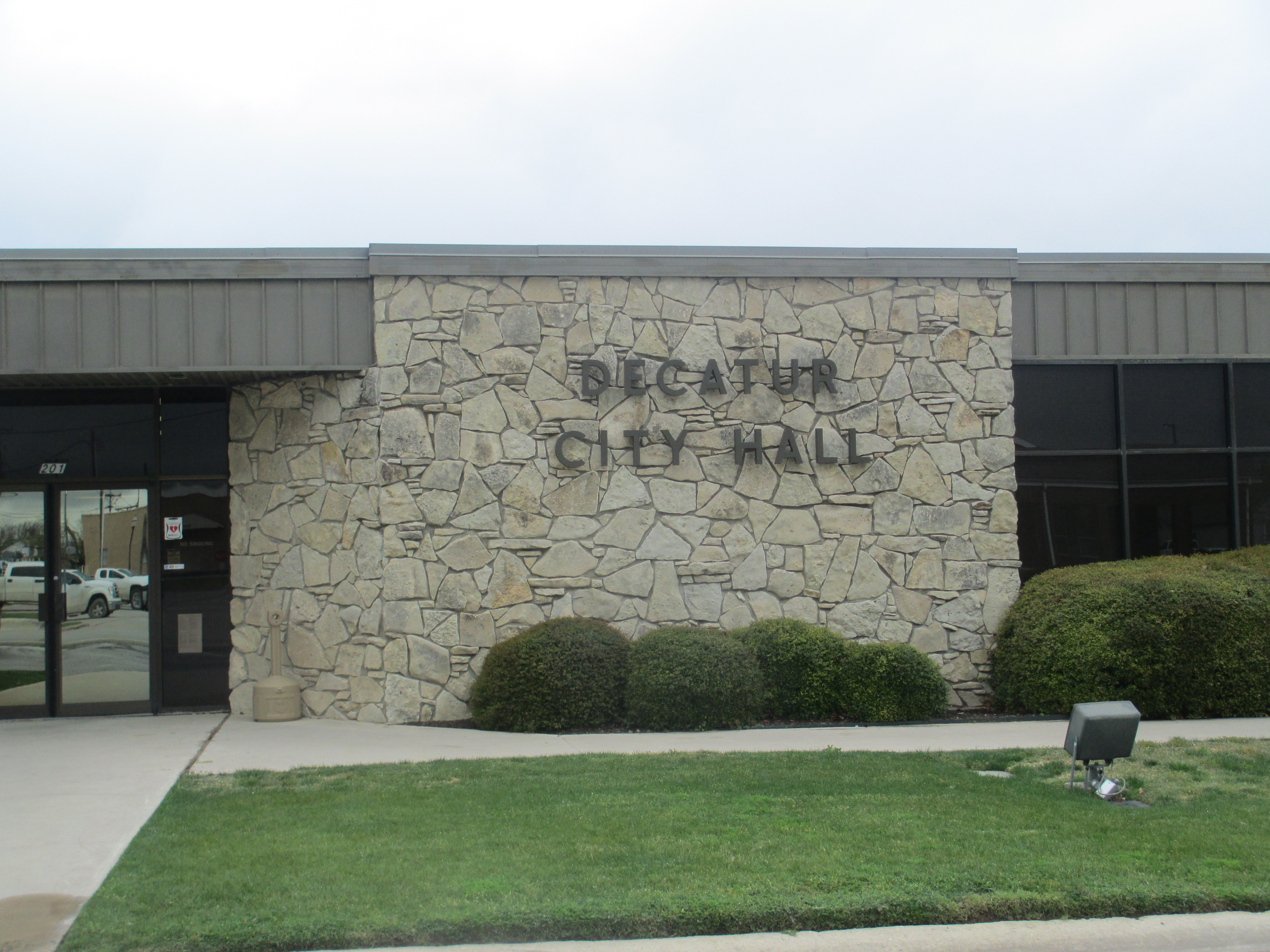
Decatur City Hall

== History ==
Wise County was established in 1856, and Taylorsville (in honor of Zachary Taylor) was made the county seat.

Absalom Bishop, an early settler and member of the Texas Legislature, opposed naming the town after a Whig Party member, and in 1858, arranged to have the name changed to Decatur, in honor of naval hero Stephen Decatur.

In 1857, a post office was opened, and the first school was established in 1857. In the early 1860s, a courthouse was erected.

=== Civil War ===
Early settlers to northern Texas came from a variety of eastern states, with about half coming from the "Deep South". Most of the rest came from the Upper South, and a number sympathized with the Unionist side at the outset of the Civil War. Cooke County and others voted against secession in this part of the state. Violence against Unionists by Confederate troops and militia was common, especially after the Confederate legislature passed an unpopular conscription law.

In October 1862, several Unionist sympathizers from Decatur were arrested by Confederate troops and taken to nearby Gainesville, the Cooke County seat, for trial on charges of treason and insurrection. About 150–200 suspects were arrested by Confederate troops. A "Citizens Court" was pulled together by local colonels, although it had no standing in state law. It quickly convicted seven men, who were executed by hanging. Mob pressure against the court arose, and it turned over 14 suspects, who were lynched - and executed by hanging without any judicial process. Nineteen men who had been acquitted were returned to the court, and a new jury convicted them without any new evidence, sentencing them to death. They were also hanged. Another two men were shot trying to escape. In all, 42 men were killed in Gainesville in these actions.

North Texas was in chaos, with dissenting citizens at risk from military forces. A few weeks later, more suspected Unionist supporters were hanged without trial in several North Texas communities. Five were lynched in Decatur, under the supervision of Confederate Capt. John Hale. The Great Hanging at Gainesville is believed to have been the largest single incident of vigilante violence in U.S. history.

=== After the Civil War ===
By the late 1860s, several stores and a hotel had been established. In 1882, the Fort Worth and Denver Railway reached the town, and Decatur was added to the Butterfield Overland mail route.

In 1881, the Wise County Old Settlers Reunion held their first meeting. This has become an annual tradition in Decatur, and the reunion continues to take place during the last full week of July.

Decatur Baptist College (now Dallas Baptist University) was established in Decatur in 1898. It was the first two-year institution of higher education in Texas. In 1965, the college moved to Dallas to be in a larger population center. The former Administration Building then housed the Wise County Heritage Museum. The building was destroyed in a fire in 2023. It is one of five sites in Decatur listed on the National Register of Historic Places.

The Wise County Courthouse was designed by James Riely Gordon, the master architect of Texas courthouses. Completed in 1896, the building is an example of Gordon's Signature Plan. He used corner entrances (making for short halls) to draw in the breeze, which was pulled up through a central atrium like a chimney, providing excellent air circulation. The exterior is Texas red granite (like the Capitol) with terra cotta ornamentation. The almost pyramidal mass refers to 1,000-year-old churches in the south of France. The building has been praised, with its "sister" courthouse in Waxahachie, as "the zenith of Gordon's Richardsonian Romanesque work". It is listed on the National Register of Historic Places.

Another historic building found on the east side of the city is the Texas Tourist Camp, dating back to 1927.

In 1962, Eddie Wayne Hill, lead guitarist for Tommy & the Tom Toms, and drummer Joel Colbert, were killed when their convertible collided head-on with a gravel truck on State Highway 114 south of Decatur. Country singer Charley Pride was more fortunate, surviving a mid-air crash with another plane over Decatur in 1980, though two people died in the crash.

== Geography ==
According to the United States Census Bureau, the city has a total area of 8.5 square miles (22 km^{2}), all land. The highest point of elevation in the county is the courthouse site. As with ancient hill towns in Europe, the frontier settlement was developed on high ground for defensive purposes, so European settlers could see and ward off attacks or raids, in this case by Native Americans.

=== Climate ===
The climate in this area is characterized by hot, humid summers and generally mild to cool winters. According to the Köppen climate classification, Decatur has a humid subtropical climate, Cfa on climate maps.

Climate data for Decatur, Texas (1991–2020)
Month	Jan	Feb	Mar	Apr	May	Jun	Jul	Aug	Sep	Oct	Nov	Dec	Year
Mean daily maximum °F (°C)	56.2 (13.4)	60.1 (15.6)	68.1 (20.1)	75.7 (24.3)	82.7 (28.2)	90.8 (32.7)	95.4 (35.2)	94.9 (34.9)	88.5 (31.4)	78.6 (25.9)	66.9 (19.4)	58.0 (14.4)	76.3 (24.6)
Daily mean °F (°C)	44.7 (7.1)	48.3 (9.1)	56.2 (13.4)	64.1 (17.8)	72.5 (22.5)	80.6 (27.0)	84.7 (29.3)	84.1 (28.9)	76.7 (24.8)	66.2 (19.0)	55.0 (12.8)	46.6 (8.1)	65.0 (18.3)
Mean daily minimum °F (°C)	33.2 (0.7)	36.4 (2.4)	44.3 (6.8)	52.5 (11.4)	62.2 (16.8)	70.4 (21.3)	74.1 (23.4)	73.2 (22.9)	64.9 (18.3)	53.7 (12.1)	43.0 (6.1)	35.1 (1.7)	53.6 (12.0)
Average precipitation inches (mm)	2.09 (53)	2.47 (63)	3.69 (94)	3.23 (82)	4.86 (123)	4.39 (112)	2.52 (64)	2.58 (66)	3.62 (92)	4.14 (105)	2.72 (69)	2.58 (66)	38.89 (989)
Average snowfall inches (cm)	0.6 (1.5)	0.0 (0.0)	0.1 (0.25)	0.0 (0.0)	0.0 (0.0)	0.0 (0.0)	0.0 (0.0)	0.0 (0.0)	0.0 (0.0)	0.0 (0.0)	0.0 (0.0)	0.1 (0.25)	0.8 (2)
Source: NOAA

== Demographics ==
Historical population
Census	Pop.	Note	%±
1880	579		—
1890	1,746		201.6%
1900	1,562		−10.5%
1910	1,651		5.7%
1920	2,205		33.6%
1930	2,037		−7.6%
1940	2,578		26.6%
1950	2,922		13.3%
1960	3,563		21.9%
1970	3,240		−9.1%
1980	4,104		26.7%
1990	4,252		3.6%
2000	5,201		22.3%
2010	6,042		16.2%
2020	6,538		8.2%
2023 (est.)	8,016		22.6%
U.S. Decennial Census

=== 2020 census ===
As of the 2020 census, Decatur had a population of 6,538 and 1,753 families; the median age was 36.1 years, with 25.5% of residents under the age of 18 and 18.3% of residents 65 years of age or older. For every 100 females there were 86.9 males, and for every 100 females age 18 and over there were 82.8 males age 18 and over.

98.3% of residents lived in urban areas, while 1.7% lived in rural areas.

There were 2,425 households in Decatur, of which 35.3% had children under the age of 18 living in them. Of all households, 48.0% were married-couple households, 15.1% were households with a male householder and no spouse or partner present, and 31.7% were households with a female householder and no spouse or partner present. About 28.3% of all households were made up of individuals and 15.0% had someone living alone who was 65 years of age or older.

There were 2,609 housing units, of which 7.1% were vacant. The homeowner vacancy rate was 2.1% and the rental vacancy rate was 8.5%.

Racial composition as of the 2020 census
Race	Number	Percent
White	4,619	70.6%
Black or African American	68	1.0%
American Indian and Alaska Native	58	0.9%
Asian	79	1.2%
Native Hawaiian and Other Pacific Islander	0	0.0%
Some other race	840	12.8%
Two or more races	874	13.4%
Hispanic or Latino (of any race)	1,952	29.9%

== Economy ==
In August 2008, Entegris acquired Poco Graphite, Inc. of Decatur, a supplier of specialized graphite and silicon carbide products for use in semiconductor, EDM, glass-bottling, biomedical, aerospace, and alternative-energy applications.

== Arts and culture ==
Decatur has a public library.

The Service Broadcasting Tower Decatur, a guyed television antenna, belongs to world's tallest constructions, standing 609.3 feet (185.7 m) above the terrain.

The Wise County Messenger has been printed in Decatur since 1880.

== Parks and recreation ==
- Kenny Renshaw Park features soccer fields, softball fields, a playground, and a walking trail.
- Wagoner Branch, Sweetwater Creek, Walnut Creek, Deep Creek and Center Creek, natural creeks flowing through Decatur.

== Education ==
The City of Decatur is served by the Decatur Independent School District (DISD), the largest district in Wise County. Decatur ISD is centered in Decatur and has six campuses: Decatur High School, McCarroll Middle School, Carson Elementary School, Rann Elementary School, and Young Elementary. During the 2010–2011 school year, Decatur ISD had 3,011 students enrolled.

Weatherford College has a branch campus in Decatur.

== Infrastructure ==
=== Highways ===
- US 380
- US 287
- FM 51
- FM 730

=== Airport ===
- Decatur Municipal Airport is a city-owned public-use airport located 2 miles north of the central business district.
- Bishop Airport is a privately owned public-use airport located 6 miles east of the central business district of Decatur.

=== Emergency services ===
Lifeteam 68, of the Air Evac Lifeteam air ambulance company, is based at Medical City Decatur Hospital in Decatur.

== Notable people ==
- Trevor Brazile, world champion rodeo cowboy
- Roy Cooper and Tuf Cooper: father/son world champion rodeo cowboys
- Bryce Elder, starting pitcher for the Atlanta Braves
- John E. Hatley, former Master Sergeant in the U.S. Army; convicted of murdering four Iraqi detainees
- Mike Lee, world champion bull rider
- José Vitor Leme, world champion bull rider
- James Maness, professional football player
- Joseph Fort Newton, minister, author
- Tom Pickett, 19th-century cowboy, lawman, outlaw
- William Raborn, Director of the Central Intelligence Agency
- Texas Ruby, country music singer
- Phil Ryan, Texas Ranger, three-term Wise County sheriff
- Samuel M. Sampler, recipient of the Medal of Honor for his actions during World War I
- Belle Hunt Shortridge (1858–1893), author
- Tommy Tatum, professional baseball player
- João Ricardo Vieira, professional bull rider
- Guinn Williams, U.S. Representative from Texas
- Guinn "Big Boy" Williams, Western movie star

== In popular culture ==
- "Eighter from Decatur" is a slang phrase used by craps shooters who want to roll an eight, as well as the title of a song (minus the "e" in eighter) by Western Swing legend Bob Wills. In 1949, Decatur mayor Syl Hardwick added the phrase to two signs welcoming tourists to the town.
