= Decatur Municipal Airport =

Airport in Texas, United States

- Decatur Municipal Airport (front) and Decatur, Texas, separated by U.S. Route 380 running left to right
- IATA: none; ICAO: KLUD; FAA LID: LUD

Summary
- Airport type: Public
- Owner: City of Decatur
- Serves: Decatur, Texas
- Elevation AMSL: 1,047 ft (319 m)
- Coordinates: 33°15′15″N 097°34′50″W

Map
- Location within Texas

Runways
Direction	Length		Surface
Direction	ft	m	Surface
17/35	4,200	1,280	Asphalt

Statistics (2022)
- Aircraft operations (year ending 9/19/2022): 36,500
- Based aircraft: 41
- Source: Federal Aviation Administration

Decatur Municipal Airport (ICAO: KLUD, FAA LID: LUD) is a city-owned public airport two miles (3.7 km) north of Decatur, in Wise County, Texas.

Most U.S. airports use the same three-letter location identifier for the FAA and IATA, but Decatur Municipal Airport is assigned LUD by the FAA and has no IATA designation (IATA assigned LUD to Lüderitz Airport in Namibia).

== Facilities and aircraft ==
Decatur Municipal Airport covers 205 acres (83 ha) at an elevation of 1,047 feet (319 m) above mean sea level. Its one runway, 17/35, is 4,200 by 60 feet (1,280 x 18 m) asphalt.

In the year ending September 19, 2022, the airport had 36,500 general aviation operations, average 100 per day. 41 aircraft were then based at this airport: 28 single-engine, 3 multi-engine, 8 helicopters, and 2 glider.

== See also ==
- List of airports in Texas
