= STAAR =

Standardized tests taken by Texas students

State of Texas Assessments of Academic Readiness
- Logo
- Acronym: STAAR
- Skills tested: Reading, Writing (integrated to RLA tests) Math, Science, and Social Studies
- Year started: 2010
- Year terminated: 2027
- Offered: Once a year, for students in grades 3 - 8, and 3 times per school year for high school
- Regions: State of Texas
- Languages: English and Spanish (Spanish only available for grades 3 - 5)

The State of Texas Assessments of Academic Readiness, commonly referred to as its acronym STAAR (/stɑːr/ STAR), is a series of standardized tests used in Texas public primary and secondary schools to assess a student's achievements and knowledge learned in the grade level. It tests curriculum, although the most recent contract gave Educational Testing Service a role in creating some of the tests, under the close supervision of the Texas Education Agency.

The test was announced because the Texas Assessment of Knowledge and Skills (commonly referred to by its acronym TAKS) assessment was repealed by Texas Senate Bill 1031 in spring 2007. The bill called for secondary schools (for grades 9-11) to take end-of-course assessments every time a student was at the end of taking a course, instead of taking general "core subject" tests. STAAR replaced the TAKS in the spring of 2012, although students who entered 10th grade before the 2011–2012 school year continued to take the TAKS. This process is part of the TAKS to STAAR transition plan. In 2015, the last students to fall under the transitional grouping had taken the TAKS test, ensuring that the first students in the transitional grouping will graduate with a completed STAAR end of course assessments. However, many policies from the TAKS are still withheld in the STAAR's policies for practical purposes.

Schools that receive funds from the state of Texas are required to enforce these tests among students who attend the schools. Any private school, charter school, or homeschooling program that does not receive monetary support from Texas is not required to take the STAAR test; as of May 2012, they can only take the TAKS test by ordering from Pearson Education (not to be confused with Pearson PLC).

On June 14, 2019, House Bill HB3906 was passed by Governor Greg Abbott for the redesign of the STAAR test and a transition from paper to digital testing (later introduced in the 2022-2023 school year).

On March 16, 2020, Governor Greg Abbott waived the STAAR for the 2019–2020 school year because of the COVID-19 pandemic, and further closed most schools by the end of spring of 2020.

== History ==
When Senate Bill 1031 was passed in the spring of 2007, it called for the TAKS to be repealed. In 2010, Texas Commissioner of Education Robert Scott announced the successor to the TAKS, STAAR. The STAAR had intensified rigorousness and end-of-course assessments, instead of a unified 9th, 10th, and 11th-grade Mathematics, ELA, Science, and Social Studies test. Therefore, a student would be required to take an Algebra I test in order to pass Algebra I, and so on. During a speech at the Texas Association of School Administrators Midwinter Conference in Austin, Scott also said the last TAKS-based school accountability ratings would be issued in 2011. Ratings were suspended in 2012 while a new accountability system was being developed, and the new state rating system made its debut in 2013.

Senate Bill 1031 gradually took its course in the spring of 2007. By 2010, the TAKS assessment was replaced with STAAR testing, and the bill officially passed by 2012 to rectify several weak points in the original TAKS testing system. The tests were seen to be simple, lacking challenging questions that would adequately prepare students to think critically in subsequent grade levels, and time limits for TAKS tests were deemed too short for students.

On June 14, 2019, House Bill HB3906 was passed by Governor Greg Abbott to instate the redesign of the STAAR test and push for a transition from paper to digital testing (later introduced in the 2022-2023 school year).

On March 16, 2020, Governor Greg Abbott suspended the STAAR for the 2019–20 school year due to school closures from the 2020 coronavirus pandemic in Texas. As the governor of Texas at the time, Abbott exercised his statutory authority and enacted Code 418.016, which called for the suspension of annual academic assessment requirements for the remainder of the 2019-2020 school year.

On April 6, 2021, the Grade 4 Writing, Grade 7 Writing, and English I STAAR tests were postponed due to technical difficulties. Grade 3 math and English STAAR tests were also postponed or skipped entirely.

== The STAAR Redesign ==
The STAAR redesign process occurred under House Bill (HB) 3906, which was passed by the 86th Texas Legislature in 2019. Before the 2021-2022 school year, schools would administer the STAAR test on paper, but with HB 3906, the new model required schools to administer the test on a computer-based system instead.

House Bill (HB) 3261, enacted by the 87th Texas Legislature in 2021, required state assessments to be administered online by the 2022–2023 school year. Online testing conditions require students to test on a computer's lockdown browser (unless they are taking the STAAR Alternate 2 assessment or require accommodations that cannot be provided through online means).

HB 3906 also called for a “multiple choice cap,” requiring that no more than 75% of points on a given STAAR test can be earned from multiple choice questions.

Additionally, the STAAR redesign process called for an increase in cross-curricular informational passages. These passages reference content from other subjects, but a student's knowledge will not affect how they are scored.

The STAAR redesign process also ensures that reading and writing are encapsulated in “Reading Language Arts” (RLA) tests, to where they will include an ECR (extended constructed response) for every grade level.

Starting in the 2022-2023 school year, STAAR tests began to use automated scoring technology to assess open-ended writing responses. The tools were used to grade extended construction responses submitted by students during RLA tests. While TEA has stated that these systems improve scoring efficiency, education advocates have expressed concerns over fairness and algorithmic inaccuracies within AI scoring systems. In response to these concerns, TEA clarified that while the AI tools are used as the first-pass grader, flagged responses are still manually reviewed by human scorers.

== Structure ==
Standard/core subject tests taken in grades 3-8
_{Grade} \ ^{Subject}	Reading	Math	Science	Social Studies	MREOC exam†
Grade 3	✔	✔			
Grade 4	✔	✔			
Grade 5	✔	✔	✔		
Grade 6	✔	✔			✔‡
Grade 7	✔	✔			✔‡
Grade 8	✔	✔	✔	✔	✔‡

Note: for grades 4 and 5, a writing STAAR test may sometimes be required as an additional, shorter test, where students are given a sheet of paper and a specific prompt (pre-determined by the school district) to write an ECR on.

Note: Students in grades 9-11 now take end-of-course (EOC) assessments. Should a student out of a EOC test, it can be replaced with substitute assessments like the ACT, SAT, TSI, and AP/IB exams.

Italics and Underlined Text indicate grade levels where a student must pass the reading and math STAAR tests to move up to the next grade level. Should a student opt out, they will be required to follow the “Did Not Pass” path through the TEA’s Student Success Initiative (SSI) Framework, creating a Grade Placement Committee (GPC) that can promote the student regardless of the student's pass/fail/opt-out status.
† - means Math-Related End-of-Course exams (e.g. Algebra I).

‡ - means that if taken, the Mathematics STAAR test is optional.

The test formats are relatively the same compared to the TAKS test in 3-8 grade;

STAAR testing formats are relatively similar to the TAKS tests that are taken in grades 3-8. However, students in grades 9-11 are required to take end-of-course tests in lieu of the normal tests outlined under the TAKS testing system.

The STAAR end-of-course assessments are, in their respective order:

- English I, II
- Algebra I
- Biology
- U.S. History

If a student in grade 8 or below takes Algebra I, Geometry, or Algebra II before grade 9, the student must take the respective end-of-course STAAR assessment as well as the standard STAAR tests given, but it is up to the school districts to determine if the student should take the STAAR Mathematics test or not; it is completely optional in this case. PSAT scores can also be used as substitute assessments.

== Testing procedure ==
A student will begin the test after instructions scripted by the Texas Education Agency are read aloud by the proctor or test administrator. Students have the whole school day (or up to two school days) to complete the test. A lunch break or breaks for medical needs may be provided during the test administration, but during this time, the students are closely monitored to ensure they refrain from talking. Students may take breaks of their own volition — for example, to go to the restroom — but no additional time is permitted to compensate for any time spent outside of the testing room. Additionally, in some schools, restrictions are often placed upon students going to the restroom, as teachers monitor and maintain a list of all students who have entered/left the restroom.

When the student finishes their exam, the student must remain in their seat(s) quietly. The proctor cannot help a student with the test, but can help the student understand the instructions. The proctor is not allowed to access STAAR test content at any time, except as mandated by a manual or documented needs of the student. Texas law provides for civil or criminal prosecution of any person(s) who divulge test content or student information. Most commonly, irregularities are investigated by the school district, reported to the Texas Education Agency, and possibly referred to the Board of Educator Certification, which may inscribe, suspend or revoke a instructor’s teaching credentials.

Any electronic devices in a student's possession must be turned off before testing begins. If a student uses a cell phone or other device to cheat (e.g.take pictures of test material or use a search engine) during the test, then the student’s test scores will be invalidated, and the proctor or test administrator responsible for monitoring the student may have to explain how the irregularity occurred in a report to the Texas Education Agency. Furthermore, the proctor or student may face legal litigation, as state law mandates that the contents of the test are the property of the state and that each student's personal information and test performance are protected for use only by those involved in the student's education.

== Versions ==
There is no version of the STAAR test for students who receive modified instruction or for students who receive instruction through bilingual Or “English as a Second Language” (ESL) programs. However, students may be provided with accommodations, called “designated supports,” if their allotted accommodations are routinely used and meet eligibility guidelines created by the Texas Education Agency. The test is available in an analog paper format and in an online format. The online STAAR test has embedded supports available that may not be fully replicated for students testing on paper. There is also an alternative test, the STAAR-ALT2, designed for students with profound cognitive limitations.

The digital version of the STAAR test was brought forth by House Bill (HB) 3906, which was passed by the 86th Texas Legislature in 2019. As a result, schools are now required to administer STAAR tests through online systems only, where students take the assessment(s) in a lockdown browser; a student requiring certain testing accommodations may be given the option to take the test on paper.

Online testing has faced resistance; those who oppose the new system argue that online or virtual tests often demonstrate declining trends in standardized scores, as students may struggle with the untraditional format. A study conducted by AIR (American Institutes for Research) found that students who took the online version of the PARCC, a Massachusetts standardized test, performed as if they had five fewer months of academic preparation in the math sections and 11 fewer months of preparation in the English section.

== Test development ==
The Texas Education Agency, Pearson Education (Texas' state assessment contractor), and Texas public school educators collaborate to create a STAAR assessment. First, educators from all over Texas review the Texas Essential Knowledge and Skills (the statewide curriculum) to determine the objectives to assess on each grade level. However, there are usually guidelines for which questions should be tested. Student expectations that will be tested yearly are referred to as “readiness standards,” and expectations that may or not be tested each year are referred to as “supporting standards.” There are rules that govern how many readiness and how many supporting standards will be used on the exam. After reviewing these standards, educators determine how the objectives could be best assessed and develop guidelines outlining eligible test content and test-item formats. This information is then transferred to the TEA and given to Pearson Education, which develops test items based on the objectives and guidelines (for the TEA to review). Teacher committees are brought to Austin to review the proposed test items; in some cases, the items may be field-tested on selected batches of Texas students in a "mock test" session. Using the input of the teacher committee and the results of field-testing, TEA and Pearson then construct the actual STAAR exam(s). Questions that prove to be extremely difficult are usually removed from the test. A more detailed explanation is available from the Student Assessment Division of TEA. Most of the procedure of STAAR test development follows the TAKS’ development procedure.

== Differences between predecessors ==
Like the TAKS test, STAAR employs standardized tests to assess students' skills in reading, writing, math, science, and social studies. The TEA states that "the STAAR tests will be more rigorous than the TAKS tests and are designed to measure a student's college and career readiness, starting in elementary school."

The TEA says that the STAAR program for grades 3–8 is meant to assess the same subjects as TAKS did, but that for high school students, "..grade-specific assessments will be replaced with 12 end-of-course (EOC) assessments: Algebra I, Geometry, Algebra II, biology, chemistry, physics, English I, English II, English III, world geography, world history, and U.S. history."

Like the TAKS, the STAAR is mandatory for students to take every academic year, unlike the Texas Assessment of Academic Skills, which called for one-time testing for each student. STAAR exams have 4-hour time limits (and a 5-hour limit for English I and English II), unlike its predecessors, TAKS and TAAS. A dictionary policy allows students to use dictionaries in the Reading or English tests starting in grade 6.

== Scoring ==
Unlike the TAKS test, on April 24, 2012, the Commissioner of Education outlined new performance standards for secondary-level students taking end-of-course (EOC) exams: “Advanced Academic Performance” (indicating the student is “highly prepared,” equivalent to the “Commended” scoring for the TAKS test); “Satisfactory Academic Performance” (indicating the student is sufficiently prepared, equivalent to the “Passing” scoring for the TAKS test); and “Unsatisfactory Academic Performance” (indicating that the student is not prepared for the next grade level, and will not advance to the next grade level, in some cases). However, Scott announced that the scoring system was suspended for the 2011–2012 school year; there have been no announcements for scoring systems within grades 3-8 as of yet.

STAAR EOC Phase-in and Final Recommended Level II and Level III Standards and Minimum Scores
Assessment	2012 & 2013 Phase-in 1 Minimum	2012 & 2013 Phase-in 1 Level II	2014 & 2015 Phase-in 2 Minimum	2014 & 2015 Phase-in 2 Level II	2016 Final Recommended Minimum	2016 Final Recommended Level II	2012 & 2013 *Phase-in Level III	2014 Final Recommended Level III
English I Reading	1813	1875	1887	1950	1936	2000	N/A	2304
English II Reading	1806	1875	1880	1950	1929	2000	N/A	2328
*English III Reading	1808	1875	1882	1950	1932	2000	2135	2356
English I Writing	1798	1875	1872	1950	1921	2000	N/A	2476
English II Writing	1807	1875	1880	1950	1928	2000	N/A	2408
*English III Writing	1808	1875	1881	1950	1929	2000	2155	2300
Algebra I	3371	3500	3626	3750	3872	4000	N/A	4333
*Algebra II	3350	3500	3604	3750	3852	4000	4080	4411
Geometry	3362	3500	3619	3750	3868	4000	N/A	4397
Biology	3367	3500	3621	3750	3868	4000	N/A	4576
Chemistry	3348	3500	3600	3750	3846	4000	N/A	4607
Physics	3346	3500	3600	3750	3848	4000	N/A	4499
World Geography	3383	3500	3632	3750	3874	4000	N/A	4404
World History	3326	3500	3576	3750	3822	4000	N/A	4634
U.S. History	3372	3500	3624	3750	3869	4000	N/A	4440

== Controversies ==
Since its implementation, the STAAR test has faced criticism from educators, patrons, and policy experts. One of the most common concerns cited is that the test encouraged teaching to the test, meaning that a teacher’s curriculum may be narrow and may limit instructional creativity. Critics also argue that the emphasis on standardized testing places undue stress on students and teachers alike, especially in under-resourced districts.

In the process of “teaching to the test,” teachers and educators have also voiced concerns for developing stress and anxiety. One study found that elementary school teachers who structure their curriculum around test items in lieu of a well-rounded and holistic education worry that communities could "[perceive] that there is a decrease in authentic education."

Education organizations in Texas, like Texas American Federation of Teachers and Raise Your Hand Texas, highlight how STAAR testing formats and standards place students from low-income communities, disabled students, and students in “English as a Second Language” (ESL) or “English Language Learner” programs at a disadvantage. In recent years, backlash has also intensified over a perceived lack of transparency in scoring and the weight of STAAR in school ratings.

Proponents of the test see it as a necessary tool to measure student progress and hold school districts accountable. However, ongoing public debate continues to shape STAAR-related policy proposals at both the legislative and district levels.

Although proponents of the test argue that the test remains necessary, the anxiety-induced stress from standardized remains prevalent in opposing discussions, where some who argue against STAAR testing correlate higher stress levels with poor test scores; studies find that "on average, students have 15% more cortisol in their systems [during] the homeroom period before a standardized test than on days with no high-stakes testing." Standardized testing can cause unnecessary stress on students and this arguably will show through poor test scores and outcomes.

== See also ==
- Texas Assessment of Basic Skills — the first standardized test used by Texas from 1980 until 1983
- Texas Educational Assessment of Minimum Skills — the second standardized test used by Texas from 1984 until 1990.
- Texas Assessment of Academic Skills — the third standardized test used by Texas from 1991 until 2002
- Texas Assessment of Knowledge and Skills — the fourth standardized test used by Texas from 2003 until 2011
- Texas Essential Knowledge and Skills — commonly referred to as TEKS, the state-mandated curriculum of Texas
