= Boyd, Texas =

- Town
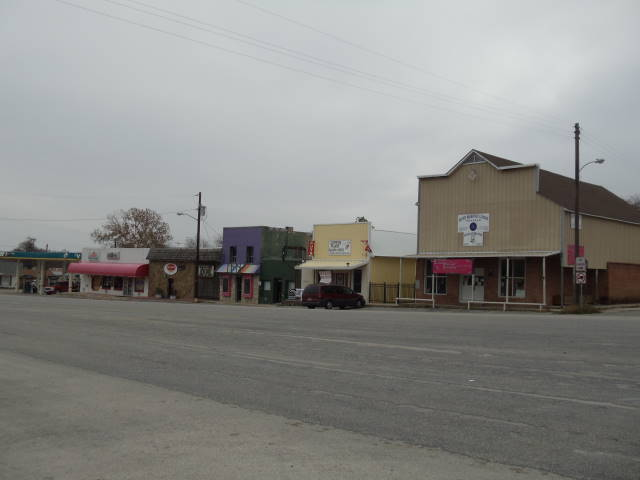
- Downtown Boyd

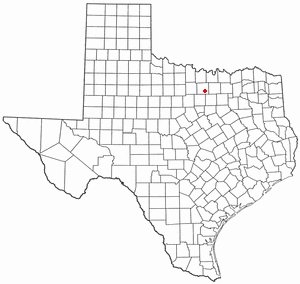
- Location of Boyd, Texas

- Coordinates: 33°05′04″N 97°33′48″W
- Country: United States
- State: Texas
- County: Wise

Area
  - Total: 4.10 sq mi (10.61 km^{2})
  - Land: 4.10 sq mi (10.61 km^{2})
  - Water: 0 sq mi (0.00 km^{2})
- Elevation: 679 ft (207 m)

Population (2020)
  - Total: 1,416
  - Density: 370.5/sq mi (143.05/km^{2})
- Time zone: UTC-6 (Central (CST))
  - Summer (DST): UTC-5 (CDT)
- ZIP code: 76023
- Area code: 940
- FIPS code: 48-09748
- GNIS feature ID: 2411715
- Website: cityofboyd.com

Boyd is a town in Wise County, Texas, United States. The population was 1,416 in 2020. It is 30 miles (48 km) northwest of the Dallas–Fort Worth metroplex.

== History ==
Originally named Greasy Bend in reference to the local hog-fattening industry, the settlement was established in the early 1890s by farmers. The Chicago, Rock Island and Pacific Railroad reached the town in 1893, and the settlement was subsequently renamed Parkhurst in reference to one of the railroad's officials. Not long afterwards, the town renamed again to Boyd (another railroad official) to avoid possible confusion with the nearby Park Springs.

== Geography ==
Boyd has a total area of 4.1 square miles (11 km^{2}), all land.

== Demographics ==
Historical population
Census	Pop.	Note	%±
1920	410		—
1930	342		−16.6%
1940	496		45.0%
1950	550		10.9%
1960	581		5.6%
1970	695		19.6%
1980	889		27.9%
1990	1,041		17.1%
2000	1,099		5.6%
2010	1,207		9.8%
2020	1,416		17.3%
2023 (est.)	1,757	▲	24.1%
U.S. Decennial Census

Boyd racial composition as of 2020 (NH = Non-Hispanic) (Note: Note: the US Census treats Hispanic/Latino as an ethnic category. This table excludes Latinos from the racial categories and assigns them to a separate category. Hispanics/Latinos can be of any race.)
Race	Number	Percentage
White (NH)	1,060	74.86%
Black or African American (NH)	13	0.92%
Native American or Alaska Native (NH)	16	1.13%
Asian (NH)	4	0.28%
Some Other Race (NH)	4	0.28%
Mixed/multiracial (NH)	57	4.03%
Hispanic or Latino	262	18.5%
Total	1,416	

As of the 2020 United States census, 1,416 people, 442 households, and 344 families were residing in the town.

== Education ==
The Town of Boyd is served by the Boyd Independent School District, which includes four schools - elementary, intermediate, middle, and high schools. In 2011, the new Boyd High School was completed. It is three times the size of the former high school building, and was needed to accommodate a growing population.

=== Sports ===
Boyd's High School football team, the Boyd Yellowjackets, are the 1983 AA and 2004 Division I—AA state champions. The Yellowjackets were also 1999 AA Division I state finalists. The Lady Jacket basketball team went to the AA state finals in 1980 and 2001. The boys' cross-country team went to the AAA state meet in 2014-15. In 2023, the Boyd High School baseball team became the AAA division state champions.

== Notable people ==
- Murry Hammond from the Dallas-based rock band the Old 97's
- Peter Mayhew, most famous for his role as Chewbacca in the Star Wars films
- Billy Joe Tolliver, former Texas Tech and San Diego Chargers QB
