= Wise County, Texas =

County in Texas, United States

- County
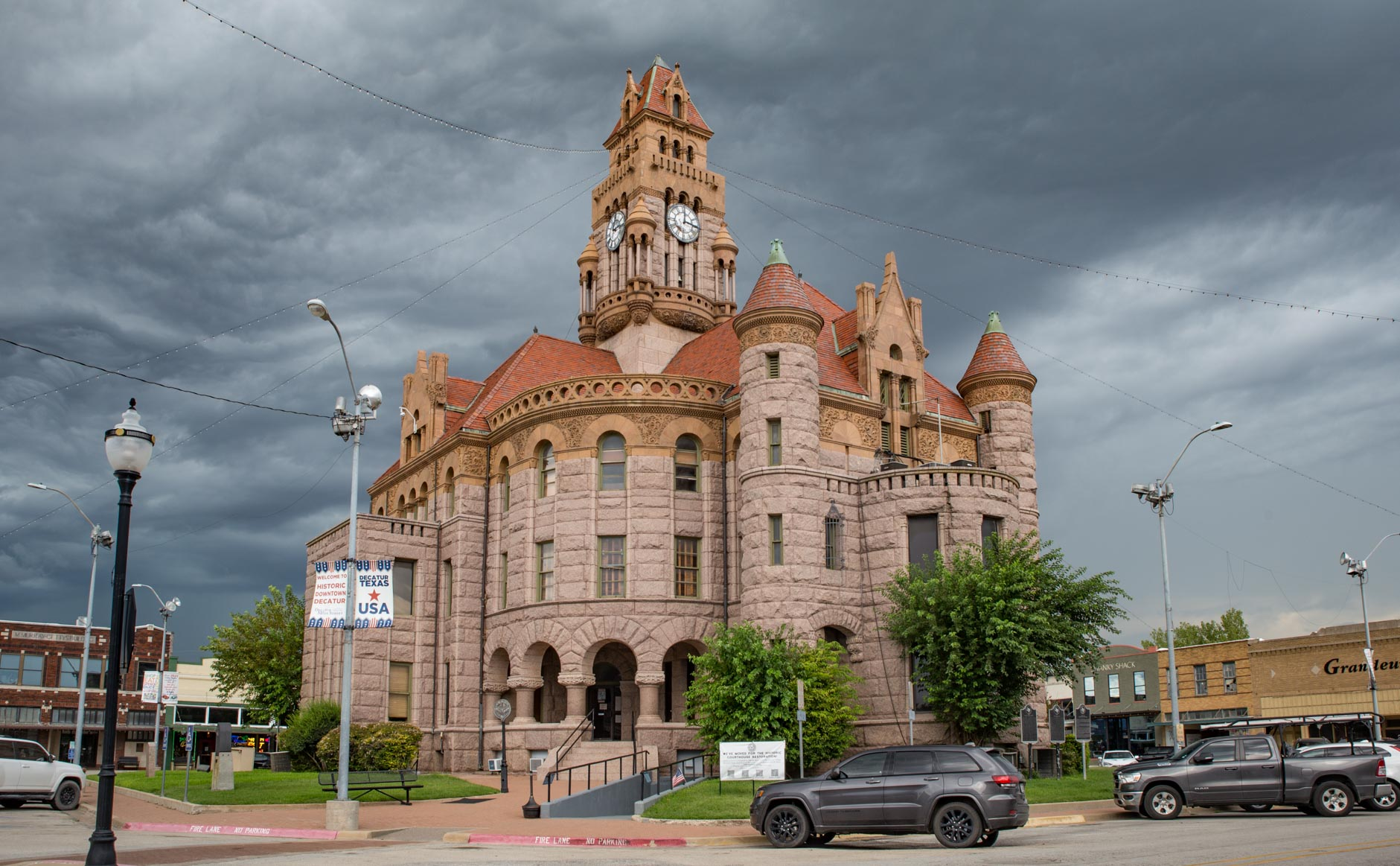
- The Wise County Courthouse in Decatur, a Romanesque Revival structure, was added to the National Register of Historic Places in 1976. As of October 2024, the courthouse is being restored.

- Location within the U.S. state of Texas
- Coordinates: 33°13′N 97°39′W
- Country: United States
- State: Texas
- Founded: 1856
- Named for: Henry Alexander Wise
- Seat: Decatur
- Largest city: Decatur

Area
  - Total: 923 sq mi (2,390 km^{2})
  - Land: 904 sq mi (2,340 km^{2})
  - Water: 18 sq mi (47 km^{2}) 2.0%

Population (2020)
  - Total: 68,632
  - Estimate (2025): 83,778 ▲
  - Density: 75.9/sq mi (29.3/km^{2})
- Demonym: Wiser
- Time zone: UTC−6 (Central)
  - Summer (DST): UTC−5 (CDT)
- Congressional districts: 13th, 26th
- Website: www.co.wise.tx.us

Wise County is a county in the U.S. state of Texas. As of the 2020 census, its population was 68,632. Its county seat is Decatur. Wise County is part of the Dallas–Fort Worth–Arlington metropolitan statistical area.

== History ==
On November 10, 1837, the Battle of the Knobs was fought in what is now Wise County between about 150 Native American warriors and 18 Republic of Texas soldiers under Lieutenant A. B. Benthuysen. Despite being heavily outnumbered, the Texan soldiers held their ground, killing or wounding an estimated 50 Native Americans and losing 10 of their own men. More settlers began coming into the area not long afterward, with people relocating mostly from the Upland South, especially Tennesseans and Kentuckians. Wise County was not founded until 1856. It was named after Virginia Congressman Henry A. Wise, who had supported annexation of Texas by the United States. He was elected governor of Virginia in 1856.

As few residents of Wise County were slaveholders, opinions were mixed at the time of the Civil War, and many people opposed secession. Unionists were persecuted in North Texas, and some were lynched. Forty-two men were murdered in the Great Hanging at Gainesville in October 1862, over the course of several days in neighboring Cooke County. This was one of the worst examples of vigilante justice in American history.

Wise County's Wise Eyes Crime Stoppers USA crime-watch program, eventually adopted by mostly rural counties in several states, was started in 1993 by then-Sheriff Phil Ryan.

In recent years, Wise County allowed an increase in hydraulic fracturing. In 2011, the Parr family and others filed a lawsuit against several energy companies, including Republic Energy, Inc. and Ryder Scott Petroleum, claiming the extracting processes have created health complications for their family and neighbors. In April 2014, the Parrs won a $2.9 million award from a Dallas jury.

== Geography ==
According to the U.S. Census Bureau, the county has a total area of 923 sq mi (2,390 km^{2}), of which 18 sq mi (47 km^{2}) (2.0%) are covered by water.

=== Adjacent counties ===
- Montague County (north)
- Cooke County (northeast)
- Denton County (east)
- Tarrant County (southeast)
- Parker County (south)
- Jack County (west)

=== National protected area ===
- Lyndon B. Johnson National Grassland (majority)

== Communities ==
=== Cities ===
- Aurora
- Bridgeport
- Decatur (county seat)
- Fort Worth (mostly in Tarrant County with small parts in Denton, Johnson, Parker, and Wise Counties)
- Lake Bridgeport
- New Fairview
- Newark (small part in Tarrant County)
- Paradise
- Rhome
- Runaway Bay

=== Towns ===
- Alvord
- Boyd
- Chico
- Crafton

=== Census-designated places ===
- Briar (partly in Tarrant and Parker Counties)
- Pecan Acres (mostly in Tarrant County)

=== Unincorporated communities ===
- Allison
- Balsora
- Boonsville
- Cottondale
- Greenwood
- Slidell
- Sycamore

== Demographics ==
Historical population
Census	Pop.	Note	%±
1860	3,160		—
1870	1,450		−54.1%
1880	16,601		1,044.9%
1890	24,134		45.4%
1900	27,116		12.4%
1910	26,450		−2.5%
1920	23,363		−11.7%
1930	19,178		−17.9%
1940	19,074		−0.5%
1950	16,141		−15.4%
1960	17,012		5.4%
1970	19,687		15.7%
1980	26,575		35.0%
1990	34,679		30.5%
2000	48,793		40.7%
2010	59,127		21.2%
2020	68,632		16.1%
2025 (est.)	83,778	▲	22.1%
U.S. Decennial Census; 1850–2010 2010 2020

=== Racial and ethnic composition ===
Wise County, Texas – Racial and ethnic composition Note: the US Census treats Hispanic/Latino as an ethnic category. This table excludes Latinos from the racial categories and assigns them to a separate category. Hispanics/Latinos may be of any race.
Race / Ethnicity (NH = Non-Hispanic)	Pop 1980	Pop 1990	Pop 2000	Pop 2010	Pop 2020	% 1980	% 1990	% 2000	% 2010	% 2020
White alone (NH)	24,985	31,340	41,991	47,122	50,495	94.02%	90.37%	86.06%	79.70%	73.57%
Black or African American alone (NH)	152	387	584	573	657	0.57%	1.12%	1.20%	0.97%	0.96%
Native American or Alaska Native alone (NH)	86	189	309	341	474	0.32%	0.54%	0.63%	0.58%	0.69%
Asian alone (NH)	25	79	107	234	372	0.09%	0.23%	0.22%	0.40%	0.54%
Native Hawaiian or Pacific Islander alone (NH)	x	x	21	15	12	x	x	0.04%	0.03%	0.02%
Other race alone (NH)	11	21	20	35	172	0.04%	0.06%	0.04%	0.06%	0.25%
Mixed race or Multiracial (NH)	x	x	513	695	2,756	x	x	1.05%	1.18%	4.02%
Hispanic or Latino (any race)	1,316	2,663	5,248	10,112	13,694	4.95%	7.68%	10.76%	17.10%	19.95%
Total	26,575	34,679	48,793	59,127	68,632	100.00%	100.00%	100.00%	100.00%	100.00%

=== 2020 census ===
As of the 2020 census, the county had a population of 68,632. The median age was 39.8 years; 24.5% of residents were under 18 and 16.1% were 65 or older. For every 100 females there were 100.8 males, and for every 100 females age 18 and over there were 99.5 males age 18 and over.

The racial makeup of the county was 78.8% White, 1.0% Black or African American, 1.0% American Indian and Alaska Native, 0.6% Asian, <0.1% Native Hawaiian and Pacific Islander, 7.6% from some other race, and 11.0% from two or more races. Hispanic or Latino residents of any race comprised 20.0% of the population.

About 9.5% of residents lived in urban areas, while 90.5% lived in rural areas.

There were 24,306 households in the county, of which 34.8% had children under 18 living in them, 60.1% were married-couple households, 15.3% were households with a male householder and no spouse or partner present, and 19.7% were households with a female householder and no spouse or partner present. About 20.4% of all households were made up of individuals, and 9.6% had someone living alone who was 65 years of age or older.

The county had 26,813 housing units, of which 9.3% were vacant. Among occupied housing units, 79.5% were owner-occupied and 20.5% were renter-occupied. The homeowner vacancy rate was 1.6% and the rental vacancy rate was 8.3%.

=== 2023 American Community Survey estimates ===
The United States Census Bureau estimated that in 2023, Wise County's population was 78,097.

Race	Total	Percentage
Hispanic or Latino	16,789	21.5%
NH White	57,409	73.5%
NH Black	1,428	1.8%
NH Asian	506	0.6%
Native American	564	0.7%
Pacific Islander	57	0.1%
NH Multiracial	1,344	1.7%

=== 2010 census ===
A Williams Institute analysis of 2010 census data found about 3.4 same-sex couples per 1,000 households in the county.

=== 2000 census ===
In the 2000 census, 48,793 people, 17,178 households, and 13,467 families were residing in the county. The population density was 54 people per square mile (21 people/km^{2}). The 19,242 housing units averaged 21 units per square mile (8.1 units/km^{2}). The racial makeup of the county was 91.01% White, 1.23% Black, 0.75% Native American, 0.22% Asian, 5.07% from other races, and 1.71% from two or more races. About 10.76% of the population was Hispanic or Latino of any race. By 2020, its population increased to 68,632; the racial and ethnic makeup of the county in 2020 was predominantly non-Hispanic White and Hispanic or Latino American of any race.

== Politics ==
Wise County, like most rural counties in Texas, votes reliably for Republican candidates in statewide and national elections.

Wise County is located within District 64 of the Texas House of Representatives. Wise County is located within District 12 of the Texas Senate.

United States presidential election results for Wise County, Texas
Year	Republican		Democratic		Third party(ies)	
Year	No.	%	No.	%	No.	%
1912	156	6.78%	1,842	80.05%	303	13.17%
1916	263	10.73%	2,023	82.57%	164	6.69%
1920	579	21.25%	2,031	74.53%	115	4.22%
1924	532	14.61%	2,958	81.24%	151	4.15%
1928	2,141	66.20%	1,093	33.80%	0	0.00%
1932	286	9.60%	2,681	89.97%	13	0.44%
1936	348	11.26%	2,737	88.58%	5	0.16%
1940	498	11.71%	3,751	88.24%	2	0.05%
1944	444	11.16%	3,114	78.26%	421	10.58%
1948	448	11.86%	3,064	81.10%	266	7.04%
1952	2,309	42.49%	3,121	57.43%	4	0.07%
1956	2,058	45.49%	2,443	54.00%	23	0.51%
1960	2,562	50.72%	2,470	48.90%	19	0.38%
1964	1,386	26.45%	3,852	73.50%	3	0.06%
1968	1,983	33.82%	2,774	47.31%	1,107	18.88%
1972	4,230	70.43%	1,741	28.99%	35	0.58%
1976	2,856	35.64%	5,133	64.06%	24	0.30%
1980	4,350	47.26%	4,674	50.78%	181	1.97%
1984	6,958	64.11%	3,856	35.53%	39	0.36%
1988	6,064	53.22%	5,288	46.41%	43	0.38%
1992	4,555	33.57%	4,478	33.00%	4,535	33.42%
1996	6,330	48.81%	5,056	38.99%	1,582	12.20%
2000	11,234	68.63%	4,830	29.51%	304	1.86%
2004	15,177	75.71%	4,783	23.86%	87	0.43%
2008	15,973	77.39%	4,471	21.66%	195	0.94%
2012	17,207	82.95%	3,221	15.53%	317	1.53%
2016	20,670	83.43%	3,412	13.77%	694	2.80%
2020	27,032	83.52%	4,973	15.37%	360	1.11%
2024	32,385	84.68%	5,605	14.66%	253	0.66%

United States Senate election results for Wise County, Texas1
Year	Republican		Democratic		Third party(ies)	
Year	No.	%	No.	%	No.	%
2024	31,060	81.44%	6,350	16.65%	730	1.91%

United States Senate election results for Wise County, Texas2
Year	Republican		Democratic		Third party(ies)	
Year	No.	%	No.	%	No.	%
2020	26,630	83.22%	4,644	14.51%	725	2.27%

Texas Gubernatorial election results for Wise County
Year	Republican		Democratic		Third party(ies)	
Year	No.	%	No.	%	No.	%
2022	21,979	85.12%	3,538	13.70%	304	1.18%

== Education ==
These school districts lie entirely within Wise County:

- Alvord Independent School District
- Boyd Independent School District
- Bridgeport Independent School District
- Chico Independent School District
- Decatur Independent School District
- Paradise Independent School District
- Slidell Independent School District

This private educational institution serves Wise County:

- Victory Christian Academy

This higher education institution serves Wise County:

- Weatherford College

== Transportation ==
=== Major highways ===
- U.S. Highway 81
- U.S. Highway 287
- U.S. Highway 380
- State Highway 101
- State Highway 114
- State Highway 199
- Loop 373
- Loop 444

=== Airports ===
These public-use airports are located in the county:

- Bishop Airport (76T)
- Bridgeport Municipal Airport (XBP)
- Decatur Municipal Airport (LUD)
- Heritage Creek Airstrip (58T)
- Rhome Meadows Airport (T76)

== See also ==
- List of museums in North Texas
- National Register of Historic Places listings in Wise County, Texas
- Recorded Texas Historic Landmarks in Wise County
