= List of Abilene Christian Wildcats in the NFL draft =

This is a list of Abilene Christian Wildcats football players in the NFL draft.

== Key ==
B	Back	K	Kicker	NT	Nose tackle
C	Center	LB	Linebacker	FB	Fullback
DB	Defensive back	P	Punter	HB	Halfback
DE	Defensive end	QB	Quarterback	WR	Wide receiver
DT	Defensive tackle	RB	Running back	G	Guard
E	End	T	Offensive tackle	TE	Tight end

== Selections ==
Year	Round	Pick	Player	Team	Position
1951	14	168	Bailey Woods	Chicago Bears	B
1951	28	330	Bill Ayre	Green Bay Packers	B
1952	21	245	Les Wheeler	Philadelphia Eagles	G
1952	24	280	E. J. Moore	Chicago Cardinals	G
1954	21	246	Sonny Cleere	Chicago Bears	T
1955	9	105	Von Morgan	Philadelphia Eagles	E
1955	19	219	Jim Cobb	Baltimore Colts	T
1956	8	88	Charley Smith	San Francisco 49ers	E
1956	15	172	Gene Boyd	San Francisco 49ers	B
1956	25	291	Paul Goad	San Francisco 49ers	B
1958	17	194	Mac Starnes	Chicago Cardinals	C
1961	13	173	Bob McLeod	Chicago Bears	E
1966	10	142	Mike Capshaw	Los Angeles Rams	T
1967	5	121	Bernie Erickson	San Diego Chargers	LB
1967	15	376	Mike Love	Pittsburgh Steelers	RB
1969	17	436	Bob Oliver	Cleveland Browns	DE
1970	3	60	Chip Bennett	Cincinnati Bengals	LB
1971	2	44	Wayne Walton	New York Giants	T
1972	8	189	Ron Vinson	New Orleans Saints	WR
1973	10	256	Tommy Humphrey	Cleveland Browns	T
1974	4	103	Richard Williams	Cincinnati Bengals	WR
1975	14	347	David Henson	San Francisco 49ers	WR
1976	14	399	Raymond Crosier	St. Louis Cardinals	DE
1977	2	32	Johnny Perkins	New York Giants	WR
1977	6	154	Wilbert Montgomery	Philadelphia Eagles	RB
1977	12	316	Ove Johansson	Houston Oilers	K
1983	6	161	Grant Feasel	Baltimore Colts	C
1983	11	292	Steve Parker	New England Patriots	WR
1985	9	252	Dan Remsberg	San Diego Chargers	T
2006	2	42	Danieal Manning	Chicago Bears	DB
2009	5	140	Johnny Knox	Chicago Bears	WR
2009	6	209	Bernard Scott	Cincinnati Bengals	RB
2011	4	111	Clyde Gates	Miami Dolphins	WR
2012	7	252	Daryl Richardson	St. Louis Rams	RB

== Notable undrafted players ==
Note: No drafts held before 1920

Debut year	Player name	Position	Debut NFL/AFL team	Notes
1941	Thurmon Jones	RB/DB	Brooklyn Dodgers	
1947	Dick Stovall	C	Detroit Lions	
1949	Vitamin Smith	HB	Los Angeles Rams	
1978	Cleo Montgomery	WR	Washington Redskins	
1980	Greg Feasel	T	Seattle Seahawks	
1984	Mark Jackson	DB	Buffalo Bills	
1986	Steve Jacobson	G	Chicago Bears	
1987	Reggie McGowan	WR	New York Giants	
1990	John Layfield	OL/RT	Los Angeles Raiders	
1999	James Hill	TE	Seattle Seahawks	
1999	Justin Lucas	CB	Arizona Cardinals	
2011	Raymond Radway	WR	Dallas Cowboys	
2011	Trevis Turner	OL	Pittsburgh Steelers	
2012	Aston Whiteside	DE	Dallas Cowboys	
2014	Taylor Gabriel	WR	Cleveland Browns	
2014	Charcandrick West	RB	Kansas City Chiefs	
