= KVWC =

KVWC may refer to:

- KVWC (AM), a radio station (1490 AM) licensed to Vernon, Texas, United States
- KVWC-FM, a radio station (103.1 FM) licensed to Vernon, Texas, United States
