= Oklaunion, Texas =

Unincorporated community in Texas, US

Oklaunion is an unincorporated community in Wilbarger County, Texas, United States. According to the Handbook of Texas, the community had an estimated population of 138 in 2000.

== Geography ==
Oklaunion is located at 34°07′46″N 99°08′39″W. It is situated at the junction of U.S. Highways 70, 183, and 283 in northeastern Wilbarger County, approximately nine miles east of Vernon. The nearest large city is Wichita Falls, located 42 miles east of Oklaunion.

=== Climate ===
The climate in this area is characterized by hot, humid summers and generally mild to cool winters. According to the Köppen climate classification system, Oklaunion has a humid subtropical climate (Cfa).

== History ==
Originally known as Mayflower, the community was renamed Oklaunion around 1888 by Joseph S. "Buckskin" Works. The reason behind the name change was an attempt to attract the Frisco line to the community so that it would connect with the Fort Worth and Denver City Railway. Nearby Vernon was chosen as the site for the linkage, however, but Oklaunion prospered as a stop on the Fort Worth and Denver City line. A post office was established in 1889 and a school opened during the mid-1890s.

The community voted to incorporate on June 6, 1928. In 1930, the town had a population of 254. That figure fell to 223 in 1940 and 129 by 1950. Sometime after, the town dissolved its incorporation. The population had fallen to fewer than 140 in 1990 and remained at that level by 2000.

Although Oklaunion is unincorporated, it has a post office with the zip code of 76373.

== Demographics ==
Historical population
Census	Pop.	Note	%±
2020	88		—
U.S. Decennial Census; 1850–1900 1910; 1920 1930 1940; 1950 1960 1970; 1980 1990 2000; 2010 2020

Oklaunion first appeared as a census designated place in the 2020 U.S. census.

=== 2020 census ===
Oklaunion CDP, Texas – Racial and ethnic composition Note: the US Census treats Hispanic/Latino as an ethnic category. This table excludes Latinos from the racial categories and assigns them to a separate category. Hispanics/Latinos may be of any race.
Race / Ethnicity (NH = Non-Hispanic)	Pop 2020	% 2020
White alone (NH)	54	61.36%
Black or African American alone (NH)	1	1.14%
Native American or Alaska Native alone (NH)	1	1.14%
Asian alone (NH)	2	2.27%
Native Hawaiian or Pacific Islander alone (NH)	0	0.00%
Other race alone (NH)	0	0.00%
Mixed race or Multiracial (NH)	2	2.27%
Hispanic or Latino (any race)	28	31.82%
Total	88	100.00%

As of the 2020 United States census, there were 88 people, 43 households, and 43 families residing in the CDP.

== Power supply facilities ==
Near Oklaunion, there is a coal-fired power station, named Oklaunion Power Plant. It has a capacity of 650 megawatts.

Since 1984 there has been a back-to-back HVDC station at Oklaunion which was built by General Electric. It works with a voltage of 345 kV and has a transfer rate of 220 megawatts. The plant was scheduled to be shut down in September 2020. The reason was high cost to keep the emissions at levels acceptable. The plant was bid on and won by Frontier Energy. They will convert the plant to natural gas, a cleaner burning fossil fuel.

== Education ==
Public education in the community of Oklaunion is provided by the Vernon Independent School District. The Oklaunion Independent School District consolidated with Vernon in 1967.
