= Aston Whiteside =

American football player (born 1989)

No. 51, 91, 93
- Position: Defensive end

Personal information
- Born: May 19, 1989 (age 37); Wichita County, Texas, U.S.
- Listed height: 6 ft 2 in (1.88 m)
- Listed weight: 240 lb (109 kg)

Career information
- High school: Vernon (Vernon, Texas)
- College: Abilene Christian (2007–2011)

Career history
- 2012: Dallas Cowboys*
- 2012–2013: Chicago Bears*
- 2013: Cincinnati Bengals*
- 2014: Toronto Argonauts
- 2015–2016: Ottawa Redblacks
- 2017: Edmonton Eskimos*
- 2017: Calgary Stampeders
- * Offseason or practice squad member only

Awards and highlights
- Grey Cup champion (2016); 4× First-team LSC South (2008–2011); 3× LSC South Defensive Lineman of the Year (2008, 2010–2011); LSC South Defensive Player of the Year (2011)
- Stats at Pro Football Reference
- Stats at CFL.ca

Aston Rashaud Whiteside (born May 19, 1989) is an American former professional football defensive end. He played college football for the Abilene Christian Wildcats, where he was a four-time first-team Lone Star Conference (LSC) South selection and a three-time LSC South Defensive Lineman of the Year. After going undrafted in the 2012 NFL draft, he signed with the Dallas Cowboys of the National Football League (NFL) but was waived before the start of the season. He then spent time on the practice squad of the Chicago Bears in 2012 and 2013, and the practice squad of the Cincinnati Bengals in 2013. Whiteside later played in the Canadian Football League (CFL) from 2014 to 2017 for the Toronto Argonauts, Ottawa Redblacks, and Calgary Stampeders. He won the 104th Grey Cup with the Redblacks in 2015. He was also an offseason member of the Edmonton Eskimos in 2017.

== Early life ==
Aston Rashaud Whiteside was born on May 19, 1989, in Wichita County, Texas. He played both fullback and outside linebacker at Vernon High School in Vernon, Texas, from 2003 to 2006. He ran for 1,934 yards and 24 touchdown his senior year in 2006, garnering first team all-district recognition while leading the team to a Class 3A Division II semifinals loss to Celina High School. He was named the most valuable player of the Times Record News Red River 22 team. Whiteside also played in the Texas High School Coaches Association all-star game as part of the North team, rushing five times for 15 yards in a 14–0 loss. He graduated from Vernon High in 2007.

== College career ==
Whiteside played college football for the Abilene Christian Wildcats of NCAA Division II from 2008 to 2011 as a defensive end. He initially joined the team as a linebacker but moved to defensive end his redshirt year in 2007 after a series of injuries at the position. While at Abilene Christian, he played with his cousins Daryl Richardson, Clyde Gates, and Bernard Scott.

Whiteside recorded 30 tackles, nine sacks, two forced fumbles, four fumble recoveries, three pass breakups, and one blocked kick in 2008. He returned two of his fumble recoveries for touchdowns. The Wildcats finished with a 10–0 record, which was the second perfect season in team history and the first since 1950. He earned first-team all-Lone Star Conference (LSC) South Division, LSC South co-Defensive Lineman of the Year, LSC South Freshman of the Year, first-team Daktronics NCAA Division II all-Super Region 4, and Don Hansen's Football Gazette third team all-region honors that season. Whiteside totaled 9.5 sacks, 14.5 tackles for loss, and one pass breakup in 2009, garnering first-team All-LSC South, first-team All-American, and first-team all-region accolades. His sack total that year was second in the LSC and first on the team.

Whiteside played in 12 games, starting 10, during the 2010 season, recording 28 tackles, seven sacks, five fumble recoveries, three blocked kicks, and one interception that he also returned for a touchdown. His sack total and 14.5 tackles for loss led the team in both categories. The Wildcats finished the regular season with an 11–0 record, the third perfect season in team history. He was named first-team all-LSC South, LSC South Defensive Lineman of the Year, Football Gazette third-team All-American, Daktronics all-Region IV, and Daktronics Region IV Defensive Player of the Year. He totaled 40 tackles and six sacks his senior year in 2011, earning first-team All-LSC South for the fourth consecutive year, LSC South Defensive Lineman of the Year for the third time, LSC South Defensive Player of the Year, and first-team AFCA All-American honors. Whiteside finished his college career with the second most sacks in school history.

== Professional career ==
On April 3, 2012, at Abilene Christian's Pro Day, Whiteside ran drills at defensive end, defensive tackle, outside linebacker, fullback and tight end. He recorded a 4.74 second 40-yard dash, a 33.5 inch vertical leap, and 19 reps of 225 pounds in the bench press.

After going undrafted in the 2012 NFL draft, Whiteside signed with the Dallas Cowboys on May 4, 2012. He grew up a Cowboys fan. He was moved to inside linebacker while with the Cowboys, and was later waived on August 5, 2012.

Whiteside signed with the Chicago Bears of the NFL as a defensive end on August 11, 2012. He was waived on August 31 and signed to the team's practice squad on September 2. In October 2012, as part of a prank by Bears veterans, Whiteside and fellow rookie Shea McClellin were given a fake $38,091.91 dinner bill. Whiteside was waived again on October 16, and re-signed to the practice squad on November 28. Whiteside signed a futures contract with the Bears on December 30, 2012. He was waived by the Bears on August 30, 2013, and signed to the practice squad on September 2. He was waived by the Bears for the last time on October 8, 2013.

Whiteside was signed to the practice squad of the Cincinnati Bengals of the NFL on November 11, 2013. He was waived on December 3, 2013.

Whiteside signed with the Toronto Argonauts of the Canadian Football League (CFL) on February 24, 2014. He dressed in 15 games, starting 14, for the Argonauts during the 2014 season. He also had two stints on the injured list. On October 8, 2014, he was fined by the CFL for "an illegal and dangerous hit on a quarterback in which he led with his helmet". Overall, he recorded 17 defensive tackles, two sacks, three forced fumbles, one fumble recovery, and one pass breakup in 2014. Whiteside was released by the Argonauts on June 21, 2015.

Whiteside was signed to the practice roster of the Ottawa Redblacks of the CFL on July 20, 2015. He was promoted to the active roster on July 23. He was ranked second on the CFL Top Performers of the Week for Week 5 after accumulating two tackles, two sacks, two forced fumbles and one fumble recovery in a 29–26 overtime win over the Calgary Stampeders. Whiteside suffered a season-ending knee injury on August 30 against the Saskatchewan Roughriders. He was leading the team with seven sacks at the time of his injury. Overall, he played in five games, all starts, for the Redblacks during the 2015 season, totaling 13 defensive tackles, seven sacks, two forced fumbles, and one fumble recovery. He was transferred to the retired list on April 25, 2016. However, he was later transferred back to active status on May 29. Whiteside appeared in 11 games, all starts, in 2016, accumulating 13 defensive tackles, one special teams tackle, three sacks, two forced fumbles, and one pass breakup. He also had several stints on the injured list that year. On November 27, 2016, the Redblacks won the 104th Grey Cup against the Calgary Stampeders. He became a free agent after the 2016 season.

Whiteside signed with the CFL's Edmonton Eskimos on February 16, 2017. On May 28, he was transferred to the suspended list after having passport issues. He was released by the Eskimos on June 13, 2017.

Whiteside was signed to the practice roster of the Calgary Stampeders of the CFL on July 3, 2017. He was promoted to the active roster on July 6 after Charleston Hughes suffered an injury. He played in one game for the Stampeders in 2017, recording one defensive tackle, before being transferred to the injured list on July 13. Whiteside was released by the Stampeders on August 30, 2017.
