= Wilbarger =

Wilbarger may refer to:

- Wilbarger County, Texas
- Josiah P. Wilbarger (1801–1845), early Texan settler
