= Northside School (Fargo, Texas) =

Northside High School (Wilbarger County, Texas)

Location
- 18040 Hwy 283 N ESC Region 9 Vernon, Wilbarger County, Texas 76384; United States; 34.305374°N 99.301247°W

Information
- Type: Public
- Established: 1936
- School district: Northside Independent School District (NISD)
- Superintendent: Mark Haught
- Principal: Molly Lemon (K-12)
- Teaching staff: 17.80 (on an FTE basis)
- Grades: K to 12
- Enrollment: 234 (2023-2024)
- Student to teacher ratio: 13.15
- Colors: Maroon & White
- Athletics conference: UIL A Div 1
- Mascot: Indian
- Football District: 3-1A
- Website: Official Website

Northside School is a public high school located approximately 12 miles north of Vernon, Texas (USA). It is part of the Northside Independent School District located in northwestern Wilbarger County. As the school has a Vernon, Texas mailing address, it is often referred to as Vernon Northside. In 2017, the school was rated "Met Standard" by the Texas Education Agency, with a 1-Star Distinction for Academic Achievement in Science.

== Athletics ==
The Northside Indians compete in the following sports:

- Basketball
- Cross Country
- 6-Man Football
- Track and Field

=== State Titles ===
- Football - In 2006 the Indians defeated Jayton 60–41 in the 1A Six-Man Division 2 championship game to claim their first state title ever.
- Cheerleading: In 2024 AND 2025, the Northside Indians Cheer team won back to back State Championships at the UIL State Championships in Ft. Worth, TX.
