= William A. Bond =

American big game hunter

William Anderson Bond (December 6, 1917 – June 9, 1992) was an American big game hunter. He had a collection of more than 130 individual game trophy mounts, which he donated to the Red River Valley Museum in Vernon, Texas, where they have been on display since 1985. Bond also owned one of the largest private collections of Civil War artifacts; after his death they were auctioned to museums and other collections worldwide. He was the owner of the 5,000-acre 5BB Ranch in Vernon, Texas.

== Biography ==
William Bond was born on December 6, 1917, in Vernon, Texas to Daniel Henry Bond and Ethel W. Anderson. Bond's ancestors were the largest plantation operators in Tennessee. Bond graduated from the Virginia Military Institute. He served in the United States Army in World War II, reaching the rank of major. After the war ended, Bond went on a major hunt every year for the rest of his life, including a hunt in Kenya in 1960. He was the 8th man in the world to have taken all 25 types of North American big game.

For seventeen years, Bond was chairman of the board of Waggoner National Bank. He was the author of the book Bill Bond Chronicle. He received the Dallas Safari Club's Africa Big Game Award in 1969 and 1982, and the club's Outstanding Hunting Achievement Award in 1981. He also served as treasurer of the Dallas Safari Club.

He died on June 9, 1992, in Wichita Falls, Texas, and is buried at Eastview Memorial Park in Vernon, Texas.
