= Northside Independent School District (Wilbarger County, Texas) =

School district in Texas

Coordinates: 34.3083°N 99.2994°W

Location
- northern Wilbarger County, TX ESC Region 9 USA

District information
- Type: Public
- Grades: Pre-K through 12
- Superintendent: Eddie Scheer (interim)

Students and staff
- Athletic conference: UIL Class A (six-man football participant)
- District mascot: Indian
- Colors: Maroon and White

Other information
- Website: www.northsideisd.us

Northside Independent School District is a public school district located in northern Wilbarger County, Texas. The district's school campus Northside School is located on U.S. Highway 283, 10 miles north of Vernon.

Northside ISD is a small, rural school district with one school campus serving all students in grades K-12. The district was created in 1936 following the consolidation of several smaller schools. The current school building was constructed in 1942 after the original school was destroyed by fire a year earlier.

== Academic achievement ==
In 2009, the school district was rated "academically acceptable" by the Texas Education Agency.

== Special programs ==
=== Athletics ===
The Northside Indians won their first state championship ever in six-man football in 2006.

The Northside Indians Cheer team won back to back State Titles in 2024 and 2025.

== See also ==
- List of school districts in Texas
