= Harrold, Texas =

Unincorporated community in Texas, US

Coordinates: 34°04′50″N 99°01′56″W

Harrold is an unincorporated community in eastern Wilbarger County, Texas, United States. As of the 2020 census, Harrold had a population of 87.

The Harrold Independent School District serves area students, including transfers from Electra and Vernon.

== Demographics ==
Historical population
Census	Pop.	Note	%±
2020	87		—
U.S. Decennial Census; 1850–1900 1910; 1920 1930 1940; 1950 1960 1970; 1980 1990 2000; 2010 2020

Harrold first appeared as a census designated place in the 2020 U.S. census.

=== 2020 census ===
Harrold CDP, Texas – Racial and ethnic composition Note: the US Census treats Hispanic/Latino as an ethnic category. This table excludes Latinos from the racial categories and assigns them to a separate category. Hispanics/Latinos may be of any race.
Race / Ethnicity (NH = Non-Hispanic)	Pop 2020	% 2020
White alone (NH)	69	79.31%
Black or African American alone (NH)	1	1.15%
Native American or Alaska Native alone (NH)	1	1.15%
Asian alone (NH)	3	3.45%
Native Hawaiian or Pacific Islander alone (NH)	0	0.00%
Other race alone (NH)	1	1.15%
Mixed race or Multiracial (NH)	1	1.15%
Hispanic or Latino (any race)	11	12.64%
Total	87	100.00%

As of the 2020 United States census, there were 87 people, 46 households, and 30 families residing in the CDP.
