= KVWC (AM) =

- Vernon, Texas; United States
- Broadcast area: Wilbarger County, Texas; Wichita Falls, Texas; Childress, Texas; Altus, Oklahoma
- Frequency: 1490 kHz
- Branding: AM 1490 KVWC

Programming
- Format: Full Service
- Affiliations: Texas State Network; Voice of Southwest Agriculture Radio Network

Ownership
- Owner: High Plains Radio Network; (HPRN Network, LLC)
- Sister stations: KVWC-FM

History
- First air date: July 1939
- Call sign meaning: Voice of Wilbarger County

Technical information
- Licensing authority: FCC
- Facility ID: 33056
- Class: C
- Power: 1,000 watts
- Transmitter coordinates: 34°9′12.0″N 99°16′9.0″W

Links
- Public license information: Public file; LMS
- Website: kvwc.com

KVWC is a Full Service formatted broadcast radio station. The station is licensed to Vernon, Texas and serves Wilbarger County, Wichita Falls, and Childress in Texas and Altus in Oklahoma. KVWC is owned by High Plains Radio Network and operated under their HPRN Network, LLC licensee.
