= Robert Gauldin =

American composer (1931–2025)

Robert Luther Gauldin Jr. (October 30, 1931 – September 14, 2025) was an American composer. He was professor of music theory at the Eastman School of Music.

== Life and career ==
Robert Gauldin was born in Vernon, Texas, on October 30, 1931, to Robert Luther Gauldin (1905–1959) and Lula Mae Self (1905–1977). He graduated in 1949 from Vernon High School in Vernon. During his senior year, he was Vice President of the Honor Society and, as clarinetist, President of the Band. In the 1949 Vernon High School Yearbook, he was labeled "the BEBOP man."

In 1952, Gauldin earned a Bachelor of Music degree in composition, with High Honors, from the University of North Texas College of Music. He went on to study at the Eastman School of Music where, in 1956, he earned a Master of Music degree in Music Theory, and in 1959, a PhD in Music Theory. From 1959 to 1963 he served as professor of theory at William Carey College. For the next thirty-four years – from 1963 to 1997 – he was a professor at Eastman School of Music.

Gauldin died on September 14, 2025, at the age of 93.

== Compositions ==
- Movement for Wind Quintet (©1953)
- Music for Quiet Listening (vinyl LP). "Pavane" (Side A: track 4), by Gauldin. Eastman School of Music Orchestra, Howard Hanson (conductor). Mercury SR90053. 1959. OCLC 1052998561 (all editions) (audio via YouTube).

== Publications ==
Gauldin was the author of Harmonic Practice in Tonal Music and has authored many articles in publications including Journal of Music Theory Pedagogy, Music Theory Spectrum, Journal of the American Liszt Society and Sonus.

Academic and peer reviewed
- Gauldin, Robert L. Jr. (1959). PhD thesis. University of Rochester, Eastman School of Music.
  - Part I. The Historical Development of Scoring for the Wind Ensemble. 1959. OCLC 80085182 (all editions), 1066808516.
  - Part II. Three Symphonic Studies for Wind Instruments. 1958. OCLC 19825325.
- Bribitzer-Stull, Matthew; Gauldin, Robert (2007). "Hearing Wagner in Till Eulenspiegel: Strauss's Merry Pranks Reconsidered" (PDF). Intégral: The Journal of Applied Musical Thought (21). Eastman Theory Association, Eastman School of Music: 1–39. ISSN 1073-6913. Archived from the original (PDF) on 2022-09-28.; EBSCOhost 31528457. Re: Till Eulenspiegel's Merry Pranks
Pedagogical textbooks (Note: Also peer reviewed)
- Gauldin, Robert (2004) [1997]. Harmonic Practice in Tonal Music. W. W. Norton – via Google Books (no preview). LCCN 96-28216, LCCN 2003-66237; ISBN 978-0-3939-7074-6, 0-3939-7074-4; ISBN 978-0-3939-7666-3, 0-3939-7666-1; Gale A58633797; OCLC 53223722 (all editions).
- Gauldin, Robert (March 4, 2013) [1985]. A Practical Approach to 16th Century Counterpoint (revised ed.). Waveland Press – via Google Books (limited preview). LCCN 84-15989; LCCN 2014-567211; ISBN 1-4786-0471-9, 978-1-4786-0471-6; ISBN 978-1-4786-0875-2
- Gauldin, Robert (March 4, 2013) [1988]. A Practical Approach to 18th Century Counterpoint (revised ed.). Waveland Press – via Google Books (limited preview). LCCN 87-11364; LCCN 2015-563610; ISBN 978-1-4786-0876-9; ISBN 1-4786-0470-0, 978-1-4786-0470-9; OCLC 840477436 (all editions).

== Honors ==
- 1988 – Honorary doctorate, William Carey College
- 1988 – In connection with the honorary doctorate, Gauldin was R. T. French Company visiting professor at Oxford University's Worcester College (Note: The R. T. French Company, headquartered in Rochester, and its parent, in Great Britain (Reckitt & Colman Ltd. from 1926 to 2000; then, by merger in 2000, becoming Reckitt Benckiser Group plc), established an exchange professorship between the University of Rochester and University of Hull in 1953 and later expanded to exchanges between Rochester and colleges at Oxford University (May & Klein; 1977). Today, the program continues between professors at Oxford and the University of Rochester.)
- 1952 – First Prize, Student Composition, Texas Federation of Music Clubs – Sonatina
- 1952 – BMI Student Composer Award
- 1964 – Winner of the 1954 Music Mountain Contest for works by American composers for string quartet – Partita in Four Movements: Intrada; Scherzo; Passecaille; and Rondo

== Bibliography ==
=== References ===
- Anderson, Elsie Ruth, ed. (1982). "Gauldin, Robert". Contemporary American Composers. A Biographical Dictionary (2nd ed.). Boston: G. K. Hall & Co. p. 188. ISBN 978-0-8161-8223-7. LCCN 81007047. OCLC 7795619 – via Internet Archive.
- "BMI Student Composer Award Winners". Broadcast Music, Inc.
- "NTSC Students Contest Winners". The Dallas Morning News. Vol. 103, no. 212. April 29, 1952. p. 9 (col. 5, bottom) – via GenealogyBank.
- "Gauldin, Robert L.". International Who's who in Music and Musicians' Directory. International Who's Who in Music and Musicians' Directory – In the Classical and Light-Classical Fields: 1992/93 (13th ed.). 1992. p. 382. ISBN 978-0-948875-11-3 – via Internet Archive.
- Jaques Cattell Press, ed. (1983). "Gauldin, Robert Luther". Who's Who in American Music: Classical. New York: R. R. Bowker. p. 153. ISBN 978-0-8352-1725-5. ISSN 0737-9137. LCCN 84642464. OCLC 635577325 – via Internet Archive.
- "Gauldin, Robert L.". Who's Who in America 2009. Vol. 1: A–L (63rd ed.). New Providence, New Jersey: Marquis Who's Who. 2008. p. 1729 – via Internet Archive.
- "Robert Gauldin". Who's Who in the World (24th ed.). New Providence, New Jersey: Marquis Who's Who. 2007. ISBN 978-0-8379-1137-3. ISSN 0083-9825. LCCN 79139215. OCLC 605923732.
- "Summer Commencement of North Texas State College Denton, Texas". University of North Texas. August 22, 1952. p. 9.
- "The University of Rochester One Hundred and Sixth Annual Commencement" (PDF). University of Rochester. June 10, 1956.
- "The University of Rochester One Hundred and Seventh Annual Commencement" (PDF). University of Rochester. June 9, 1957.
- "The University of Rochester One Hundred and Ninth Annual Commencement" (PDF). University of Rochester. June 7, 1959.
- "Bobby Gauldin". The Yamparika (yearbook). Vernon, Texas: Vernon High School. p. 76. OCLC 6307091 – via Ancestry.com.
