= Oklaunion Power Plant =

Coal power plant

- Country: United States
- Location: Wilbarger County, near Vernon, Texas
- Coordinates: 34°4′57″N 99°10′34″W
- Status: Decommissioned
- Commission date: 1986
- Decommission date: September 30th 2020
- Owners: American Electric Power (AEP) 70% Texas Public Utility Board 18% Oklahoma Municipal Power Authority 12%
- Operator: AEP

Thermal power station
- Primary fuel: Coal
- Cooling source: Lake Diversion

Power generation
- Nameplate capacity: 650 MW

Oklaunion Power Plant is a 650-megawatt (MW), coal power plant located southeast of Vernon, Texas, in Wilbarger County, Texas. Its unit is operated by American Electric Power (AEP). The plant began commercial generation in 1986.

== History ==
The construction for Oklaunion began in 1982 and was commissioned by West Texas Utilities, a forerunner of AEP. The plant commenced commercial generation in December 1986. Initially, the coal was transported from the Rawhide Mine in Wyoming. In 2017, the plant received 719,467 short tons of coal from the North Antelope Rochelle Mine by train according to the Energy Information Administration (EIA). The plant's cooling source came from Lake Diversion, located in Archer and Baylor County, Texas.

In September 2018, AEP announced it was shutting down Oklaunion by September 2020, citing production costs and being no longer competitive in the power market. The plant was bought by Frontier Energy, which planned to convert it to natural gas over five years. In 2022, Air Products and AES Corporation announced they were to partner up to develop a $4 billion green hydrogen facility on the site of the former Oklaunion plant.

== See also ==
- List of power stations in Texas
