= Red River Valley Museum =

Museum in Texas, US

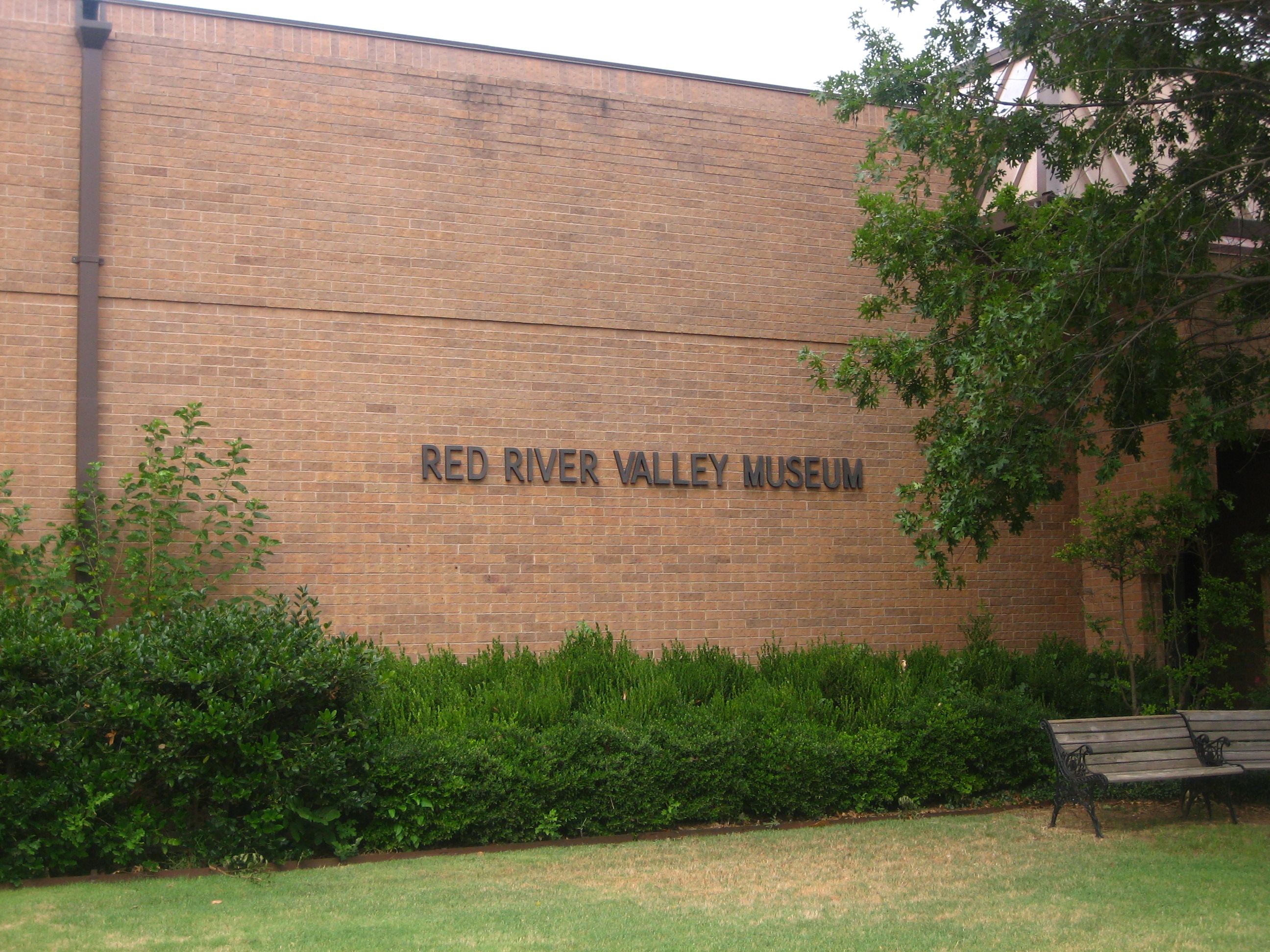
- Red River Valley Museum

- Location within Texas
- Established: 1965
- Location: 4600 College Drive; Vernon, Texas
- Coordinates: 34.159416°N 99.316788°W
- Type: Local history
- Website: Red River Valley Museum

The Red River Valley Museum is located at 4600 College Drive, in Vernon, Texas, United States.

== Museum History ==
The museum was established in 1965 and later moved to the grounds of Vernon College. It includes multiple exhibits and exhibit rooms, and sponsors the National Juried Art Show.

In the Berry History and Science Room, visitors will find exhibits that depict local history all the way back to the age of the dinosaurs, and includes an indigenous tribal artifact collection donated by Mr. and Mrs. J. Henry Ray. The Jack Teagarden Exhibit features his personal effects donated by his family after his 1964 death. Photographs and memorabilia of other locally born celebrities such as Roy Orbison can also be found in this room.

The museum collection also contains a large number of the works of sculptor Electra Waggoner Biggs.

The Early History of Vernon, Texas exhibit includes the history of the oil industry in Wilbarger County.

The William A. Bond Trophy and Game Room features mounted exotic game collected by the local hunter and rancher.

== Exhibits ==
=== The Berry Gallery of History & Science ===
Step back in time to the age of the dinosaur when you enter The Berry Room which houses select portions of the J. Henry and Ethel Ray Artifacts Collection. This vast collection of fossils and native artifacts was uncovered in over twenty-five years of exploring Wilbarger County and the Red River Valley area. The rich and colorful history of Wilbarger County can be traced over 10,000 years ago as evidenced by the artifacts found in this collection.

Continuing through the Berry Room will lead you through the course of Wilbarger County’s history. Learn about Quanah Parker, the Doan’s family and the annual Doan’s Picnic, the Great Western Cattle Drive, and so much more. The county’s more modern history is recounted in this exhibit as well. The primary source of income for Wilbarger today is agriculture and oil related products, Wright Brand Foods which is now a Tyson Plant, Solvay – a plant which produces items from guar, Vernon Regional Junior College, and a State Hospital.

=== The Bond Gallery ===
Lions, tigers, bears and more await visitors to this incredible animal collection.

This one of a kind collection features animals ranging from the tiny Dik Dik, an antelope that populates the savannahs of eastern Africa, to the mighty Polar Bear that inhabits the frigid Arctic Circle. Learn about these animals and their native habitats as you explore the gallery. This collection of animals from around the world was donated by William “Bill” Bond, a successful rancher who was instrumental in the establishment of the Red River Valley Museum.

Newly remodeled in the fall of 2020, The Bond Gallery teaches visitors the importance of conservation. Discover facts about all 130+ animals in this collection and learn how smart human impact can help endangered animals regrow their population.

=== The Waggoner Gallery ===
When W.T. Waggoner was just a lad, he and his father set about on an adventure that would end with a ranching empire of well over 500,000 acres of Texas land, covering parts of six counties. The Waggoner Ranch would come to be known as the largest ranch in the United States under one fence at 530,000 acres.

Learn about the history of the ranching industry in Wilbarger County, the Waggoner Ranch, and what it means to be a Cowboy while exploring the Waggoner Gallery.

== See also ==
- Museums in North Texas
