= Vernon Plaza Theatre =

Coordinates: 34.15313°N 99.28306°W

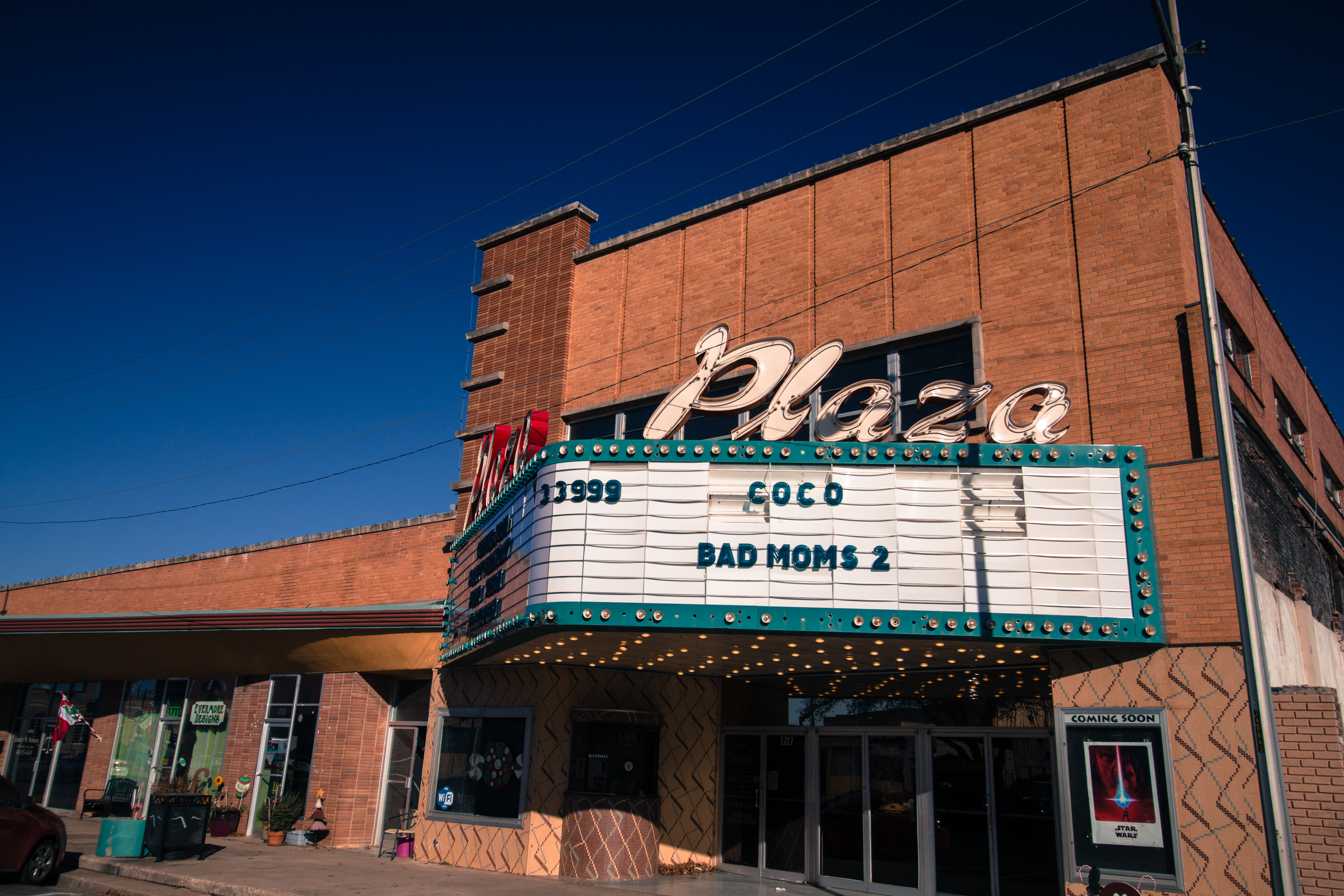
The Vernon Plaza Theatre

The Vernon Plaza Theatre, located in Vernon, Texas, first opened in 1953 as a state-of-the-art fully, modern movie house and was the first theater in Texas built to show 3-D movies. Constructed atop the ruins of the Vernon Opera House, the movie house has had several owners and in recent years fell into disrepair. Dallas artist Stephen Taylor began extensive renovations of the theater in 2004. In late 2006, author Mark Finn and his wife Cathy Day, along with Stephen Ray and spouse, Sahar Arafat-Ray, acquired and began operation of the old theater.
