= Harrold Independent School District =

School district in Texas, United States

Coordinates: 34.0789°N 99.0341°W

Location
- Harrold, TX ESC Region 9 USA

District information
- Type: Public
- Motto: "Hinc incipio itiner" ("Journeys Begin Here")
- Grades: Pre-K through 12
- Superintendent: Cody Patton

Students and staff
- Athletic conference: UIL Class A (six-man football participant)
- District mascot: Hornet
- Colors: Purple and Gold

Other information
- Website: www.harroldisd.net

Harrold Independent School District is a public school district based in the community of Harrold, Texas, United States, located in far eastern Wilbarger County. All students attend school in one building.

On August 15, 2008, the board of the Harrold Independent School District unanimously approved to let teachers bring guns to class. The identities of these teachers are known only to the superintendent and the school board, who approve each individual.

== Academic achievement ==
In 2009, the school district was rated "recognized" by the Texas Education Agency.

== Special programs ==
=== Athletics ===
Harrold High School plays six-man football.

== See also ==
- List of school districts in Texas
- List of high schools in Texas
