= KVWC-FM =

- Vernon, Texas; United States
- Broadcast area: Vernon, Texas; Chillicothe, Texas; Davidson, Oklahoma
- Frequency: 103.1 MHz
- Branding: Real Country 103.1 KVWC

Programming
- Format: Country; Farm
- Affiliations: Texas State Network; Voice of Southwest Agriculture Radio Network

Ownership
- Owner: High Plains Radio Network; (HPRN Network, LLC)
- Sister stations: KVWC

History
- First air date: April 10, 1972
- Call sign meaning: Voice of Wilbarger County

Technical information
- Licensing authority: FCC
- Facility ID: 35871
- Class: A
- ERP: 6,000 watts
- HAAT: 43 meters (141 ft)
- Transmitter coordinates: 34°9′12.30″N 99°16′10.20″W

Links
- Public license information: Public file; LMS
- Website: KVWC-FM Online

KVWC-FM is a Country and Farm formatted broadcast radio station. The station is licensed to Vernon, Texas and serves Vernon and Chillicothe in Texas and Davidson in Oklahoma. KVWC-FM is owned by High Plains Radio Network and operated under their HPRN Network, LLC licensee.
