= Jerry Haymes =

Background information
- Born: Jerry Lynn Haymes; August 30, 1940 (age 85); Vernon, Texas, U.S.
- Genres: Country
- Occupations: recording artist, songwriter, producer, publisher, radio DJ, and radio station owner

Jerry Haymes (born August 30, 1940) is an American rock musician. He has contributed to the genre of rock and roll for over 50 years. Over the years he has performed on many chart hits. Haymes is also a member of the Rock 'n Roll Hall of Fame and Texas Music Hall of Fame.

== Early life ==
Haymes was born on August 30, 1940 in Vernon, Texas. He was raised in Clovis, New Mexico, and while attending Clovis High began recording at Norman Petty Recording Studios. After graduating, Haymes attended Abilene Christian University, Southern Methodist University, and Kilgore College. He also spent time studying at the London Conservatory of Music. He was childhood friends with Roy Orbison, who he later professionally worked with. This led Haymes to Sun Records, where he was an original Sun Legends Musician and Singer.

== Other interests ==
Haymes has held various roles in the music industry, including Recording Artist, Songwriter, Producer, Publisher, Radio DJ, and Radio Station owner. Additionally, he served in the US Army, with assignments in Europe and Vietnam, where he held the rank of warrant officer. He also spent 30 years as a Southwest Conference umpire and referee. Haymes presently, though semi-retired, still performs and works as a hospital chaplain and with various military veterans groups. He is often a guest speaker at schools and for civic groups. He serves on the board of directors for several arts and entertainment organizations and museums.

As the Texas Division Chaplain for the Sons of Confederate Veterans and also military veterans, he serves just short of 3,000 veterans in the state of Texas and throughout the Southwest. Haymes is the only chaplain who has ever served under 3 different commanders. In 2011, he will be entering his 6th year in this position, making him the longest serving division chaplain on record. Haymes served with the US Army in Europe and Southeast Asia (Vietnam).

== Trivia ==
Artists Jerry Haymes has worked for or with:

- Roy Orbison
- Gene Vincent
- Buddy Knox
- Johnny Cash & Tommy Cash
- Hank Snow
- Carter Family
- Wanda Jackson
- Bonnie Tyler
- Rick Nelson
- Mel Tormé
- Mahalia Jackson
- Tony Pastor Orchestra
- The Oak Ridge Boys
- Broadway Musical Orchestra
- w/ Sara Jessica Parker

Songs Haymes is known for:

- "Party Doll"
- "It’s A Heart Ache"
- "Let’s Have A Party"
- "Smile of a Clown"
- "If You Catch Me Looking Up"
- "That’s All"
- "What Then"
- "So Fine"
- "Rose Marie"
- "Walk Through This World With Me"
- "Marry Me"

In 2005, Haymes was named as one of Billboard Magazine's Lifetime Achievement Award Winners as A Top Ten Recording Session Musician of the past 45 years.
