= Vernon College =

Community college in Vernon, Texas, U.S.

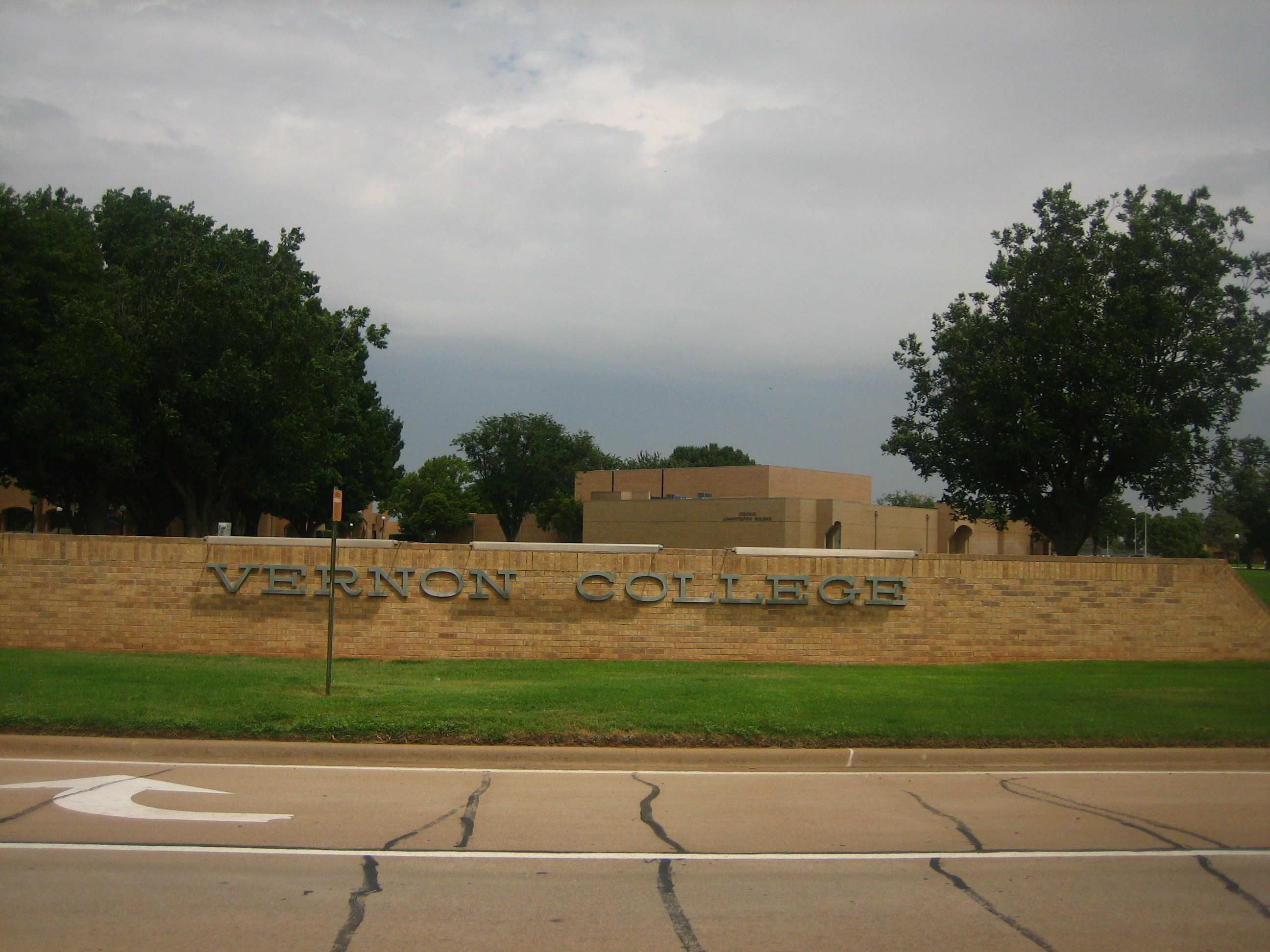
- Vernon College
- Former name: Vernon Regional Junior College
- Type: Public community college
- Established: 1972
- Students: 3,167
- Location: Vernon, Texas, United States; 34.160410°N 99.315627°W
- Website: www.vernoncollege.edu
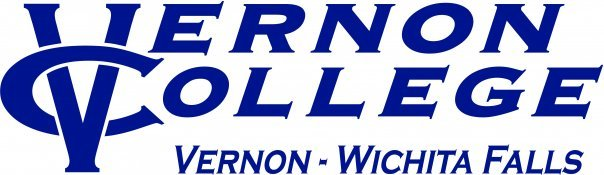

Vernon College is a public community college in Vernon, Texas.

== History ==
The two-year Vernon Regional Junior College welcomed its first student body of 608 in 1972, and had a board of trustees of seven members. In 1970, the Wilbarger County voters had elected to establish the college. The 100-acre (40.47 ha; 0.16 sq mi) campus was located at Texas State Highway 70 and US 287. Since its establishment, the college has undergone expansion that came to include the Sheppard Learning Center, Department of Vocational Nursing in Wichita Falls, VRJC Technical Center in Wichita Falls; Career Development Center in Wichita Falls; Seymour Learning Center, Burkburnett Learning Center, and Iowa Park Learning Center. In 2001, the college officially changed its name to Vernon College.

The Red River Valley Museum is located on the main campus.

=== Presidents ===
- David L. Norton (1972-1974)
- Jim M. Williams (1974-1982)
- Joe Mills (1982-1990)
- Wade Kirk (1990-2000)
- Steve Thomas (2000-2008)
- Dusty R. Johnston (2008–present)

== Service area ==
Vernon College's service area includes 12 counties in North Texas.

- Archer
- Baylor
- Clay
- Cottle
- Foard
- Hardeman
- Haskell
- King
- Knox
- Throckmorton
- Wichita
- Wilbarger
