= Clyde Gates =

American football player (born 1986)

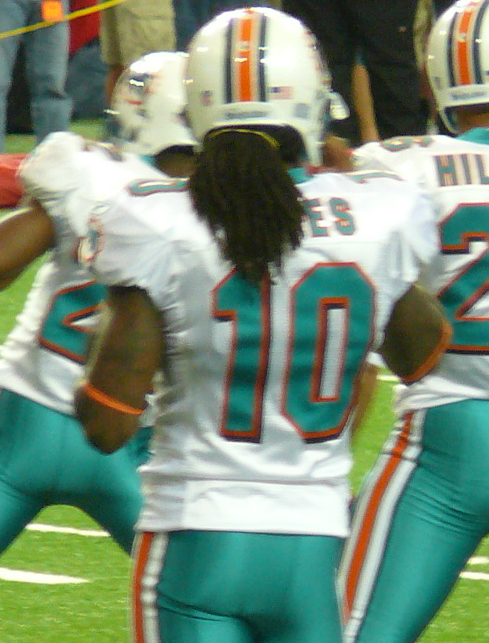
- Gates with the Miami Dolphins in 2011

No. 10, 19
- Position: Wide receiver

Personal information
- Born: June 13, 1986 (age 40); Vernon, Texas, U.S.
- Listed height: 6 ft 0 in (1.83 m)
- Listed weight: 197 lb (89 kg)

Career information
- High school: Vernon
- College: Abilene Christian
- NFL draft: 2011: 4th round, 111th overall pick

Career history
- Miami Dolphins (2011); New York Jets (2012–2013); Tennessee Titans (2015)*; Dallas Cowboys (2015)*
- * Offseason or practice squad member only

Career NFL statistics
- Receptions: 30
- Receiving yards: 365
- Stats at Pro Football Reference

Edmond Darell "Clyde" Gates (born June 13, 1986) is an American former professional football player who was a wide receiver in the National Football League (NFL). Gates played college football for the Abilene Christian Wildcats and was selected by the Miami Dolphins as the 111th overall pick in the 2011 NFL draft. He is the cousin of running backs Bernard Scott and Daryl Richardson.

== Early life ==
Gates had a rough childhood, growing up in a troubled neighborhood with his father serving 18 years in prison for murder. He intended on playing in the NBA after earning a scholarship to play basketball at Tyler Junior College in Texas. He was asked not to return for a second season. He was recruited by Abilene Christian to play football in 2007.

== College career ==
As a freshman in 2007, Clyde played in 11 games finishing with 12 catches for 285 yards and 1 touchdown. He also carried the ball 14 times for 189 yards and 4 more scores. He had 876 all-purpose yards in 2007. Gates finished his sophomore year playing 10 games, missing two games due to a leg injury early in the season, resulting in 31 catches for 716 yards and 8 touchdowns. His Junior year earned him the "top receiver for the Wildcats" with 702 yards with 5 touchdown, averaging 14.3 yards per catch.

== Professional career ==
Pre-draft measurables
Height	Weight	Arm length	Hand span	Wingspan	40-yard dash	10-yard split	20-yard split	20-yard shuttle	Three-cone drill	Vertical jump	Broad jump	Bench press
5 ft 11 3/4 in (1.82 m)	192 lb (87 kg)	30 3/4 in (0.78 m)	9 3/8 in (0.24 m)	6 ft 3 1/8 in (1.91 m)	4.49 s	1.62 s	2.63 s	4.17 s	6.87 s	40.0 in (1.02 m)	11 ft 2 in (3.40 m)	16 reps
All values from NFL Combine/Pro Day

=== Miami Dolphins ===
Upon entering the 2011 NFL draft, Gates was selected in the 4th round with the 111th pick by the Miami Dolphins. He scored his first touchdown in the Dolphins first preseason game on August 12, 2012 vs Atlanta.

Gates was released by the Dolphins on August 31, 2012.

=== New York Jets ===
Gates was claimed off waivers by the New York Jets on September 1, 2012.

Gates suffered a season-ending shoulder injury on October 13, 2013 and was placed on the injured reserve list two days later. He was released on August 30, 2014.

=== Tennessee Titans ===
On January 14, 2015, the Tennessee Titans signed Gates to a futures/reserve contract. He was waived on August 17, 2015.

=== Dallas Cowboys ===
On August 20, 2015, Gates signed with the Dallas Cowboys. He was released by the Cowboys on September 5, 2015.
