= Vernon Independent School District =

School district in Texas

Location
- Vernon, Texas ESC Region 9 United States

District information
- Type: Public
- Grades: Prekindergarten through 12
- Superintendent: Dr. Blaise Boswell

Students and staff
- Athletic conference: UIL Class AAA
- District mascot: Lion
- Colors: Maroon and white

Other information
- Website: www.vernonisd.org

Vernon Independent School District is a public school district based in Vernon, Texas, United States. The district serves a large portion of Wilbarger County and extends into a small portion of northeastern Foard County.

In 2009, the school district was rated "academically acceptable" by the Texas Education Agency.

== Schools ==
- Vernon High School (grades 9-12)
- Vernon Middle School (grades 6-8)
- Shive Elementary School (grades 4-5)
- Central Elementary School (grades 2-3)
- T.G. McCord Elementary School (prekindergarten-grade 1)
