= Wilbarger County, Texas =

County in Texas, United States

- County
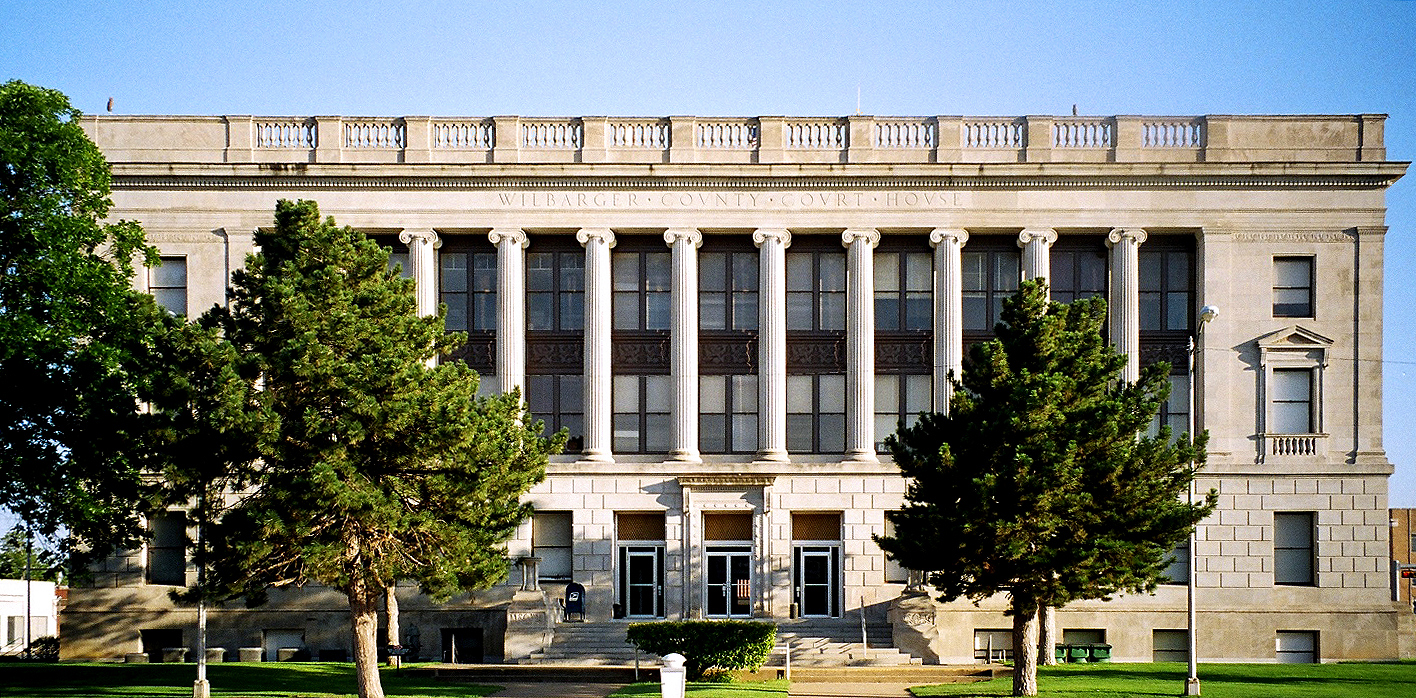
- The Wilbarger County Courthouse

- Location within the U.S. state of Texas
- Coordinates: 34°05′N 99°14′W
- Country: United States
- State: Texas
- Founded: 1881
- Named for: Josiah Pugh Wilbarger and Mathias Wilbarger
- Seat: Vernon
- Largest city: Vernon

Area
  - Total: 978 sq mi (2,530 km^{2})
  - Land: 971 sq mi (2,510 km^{2})
  - Water: 7.0 sq mi (18 km^{2}) 0.7%

Population (2020)
  - Total: 12,887
  - Estimate (2025): 12,481 ▼
  - Density: 13.3/sq mi (5.12/km^{2})
- Time zone: UTC−6 (Central)
  - Summer (DST): UTC−5 (CDT)
- Congressional district: 13th
- Website: www.co.wilbarger.tx.us

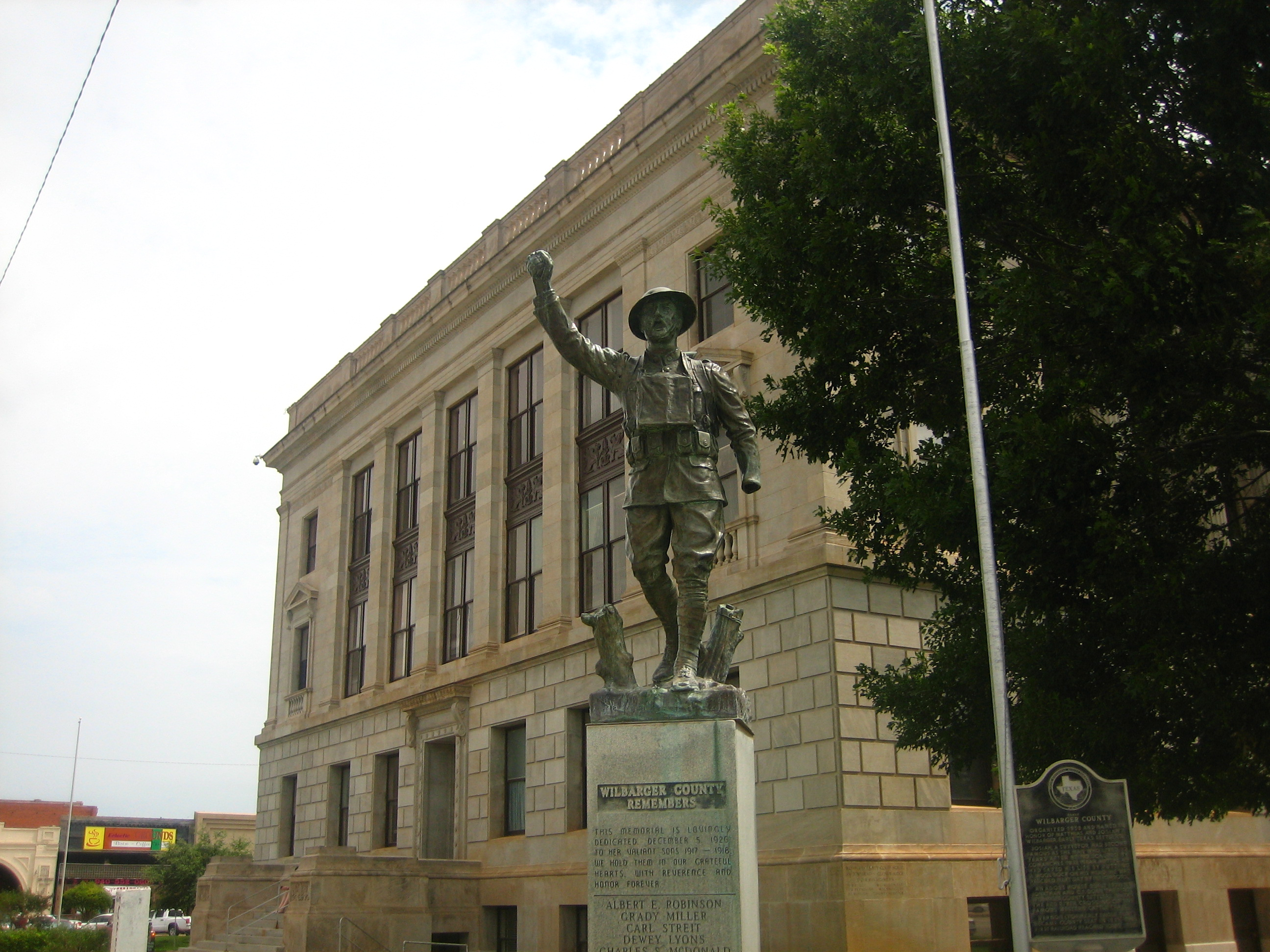
"Wilbarger County Remembers", says the veteran's memorial at the courthouse.

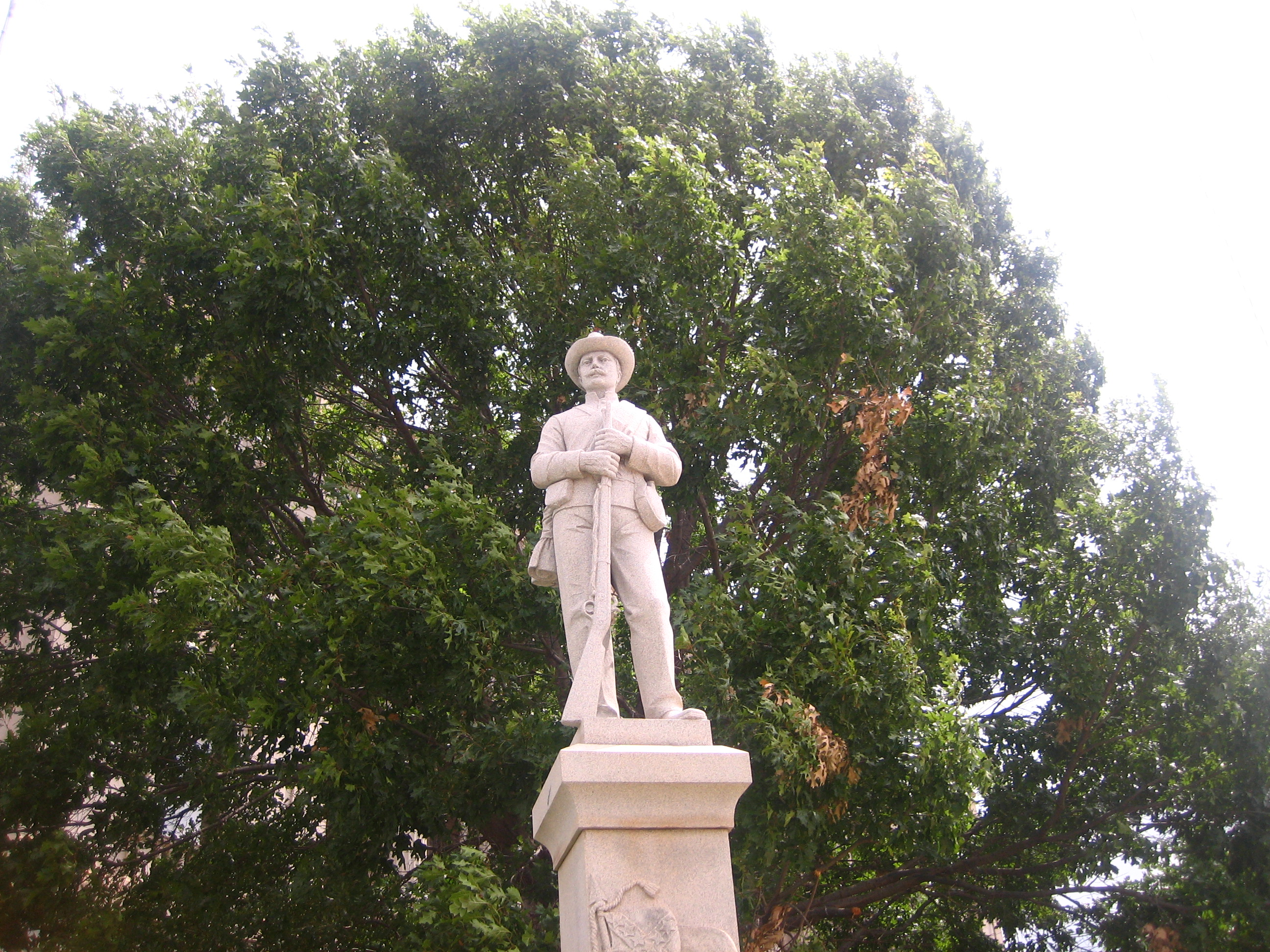
Confederate soldier monument at Wilbarger County Courthouse

Wilbarger County (/ˈwɪlbɑːrɡər/ WIL-bar-gər) is a county located in the North Texas region of the U.S. state of Texas. As of the 2020 census, its population was 12,887. The county seat is Vernon. The county was created in 1858 and later organized in 1881. Wilbarger is named for Josiah Pugh Wilbarger and Mathias Wilbarger, two early settlers.

== Geography ==
According to the U.S. Census Bureau, the county has a total area of 978 square miles (2,530 km^{2}), of which 971 sq mi (2,510 km^{2}) are land and 7.0 sq mi (18 km^{2}) (0.7%) are covered by water.

=== Major highways ===
- U.S. Highway 70
- U.S. Highway 183
- U.S. Highway 283
- U.S. Highway 287
- State Highway 240
- Loop 145
- Loop 404
- Loop 488

=== Adjacent counties ===
- Tillman County, Oklahoma (north)
- Wichita County (east)
- Baylor County (south)
- Foard County (west)
- Hardeman County (west)
- Jackson County, Oklahoma (northwest)

== Demographics ==
=== Population ===
Historical population
Census	Pop.	Note	%±
1880	126		—
1890	7,092		5,528.6%
1900	5,759		−18.8%
1910	12,000		108.4%
1920	15,112		25.9%
1930	24,579		62.6%
1940	20,474		−16.7%
1950	20,552		0.4%
1960	17,748		−13.6%
1970	15,355		−13.5%
1980	15,931		3.8%
1990	15,121		−5.1%
2000	14,676		−2.9%
2010	13,535		−7.8%
2020	12,887		−4.8%
2025 (est.)	12,481	▼	−3.2%
U.S. Decennial Census; 1850–2010 2010 2020

=== Racial and ethnic composition ===
Wilbarger County, Texas – Racial and ethnic composition Note: the US Census treats Hispanic/Latino as an ethnic category. This table excludes Latinos from the racial categories and assigns them to a separate category. Hispanics/Latinos may be of any race.
Race / Ethnicity (NH = Non-Hispanic)	Pop 1980	Pop 1990	Pop 2000	Pop 2010	Pop 2020	% 1980	% 1990	% 2000	% 2010	% 2020
White alone (NH)	12,924	11,437	10,083	8,585	7,012	81.12%	75.64%	68.70%	63.43%	54.41%
Black or African American alone (NH)	1,388	1,336	1,278	1,049	1,013	8.71%	8.84%	8.71%	7.75%	7.86%
Native American or Alaska Native alone (NH)	71	71	78	115	96	0.45%	0.47%	0.53%	0.85%	0.74%
Asian alone (NH)	46	70	91	97	566	0.29%	0.46%	0.62%	0.72%	4.39%
Native Hawaiian or Pacific Islander alone (NH)	x	x	4	6	0	x	x	0.03%	0.04%	0.00%
Other race alone (NH)	11	22	7	6	32	0.07%	0.15%	0.05%	0.04%	0.25%
Multiracial (NH)	x	x	120	169	434	x	x	0.82%	1.25%	3.37%
Hispanic or Latino (any race)	1,491	2,185	3,015	3,508	3,734	9.36%	14.45%	20.54%	25.92%	28.97%
Total	15,931	15,121	14,676	13,535	12,887	100.00%	100.00%	100.00%	100.00%	100.00%

=== 2020 census ===
As of the 2020 census, the county had a population of 12,887. The median age was 39.3 years; 23.0% of the residents were under 18 and 18.4% were 65 or older. For every 100 females, there were 98.1 males, and for every 100 females 18 and over, there were 97.4 males 18 and over.

The racial makeup of the county was 62.8% White, 8.2% Black or African American, 1.4% American Indian and Alaska Native, 4.4% Asian, <0.1% Native Hawaiian and Pacific Islander, 12.7% from some other race, and 10.5% from two or more races. Hispanic or Latino residents of any race comprised 29.0% of the population.

About 73.9% of the residents lived in urban areas, while 26.1% lived in rural areas.

Of the 4,944 households in the county, 30.2% had children under 18 living in them, 44.0% were married-couple households, 20.5% were households with a male householder and no spouse or partner present, and 29.3% were households with a female householder and no spouse or partner present. About 31.3% of all households were made up of individuals, and 13.5% had someone living alone who was 65 or older.

The county had 5,836 housing units, of which 15.3% were vacant. Among occupied housing units, 63.6% were owner-occupied and 36.4% were renter-occupied. The homeowner vacancy rate was 2.0% and the rental vacancy rate was 15.4%.

=== 2000 census ===
As of the 2000 census of 2000, 14,676 people, 5,537 households, and 3,748 families were residing in the county. The population density was 15 people/mi^{2} (5.8 people/km^{2}). The 6,371 housing units averaged 7 units per square mile (2.7 units/km^{2}). The racial makeup of the county was 78.17% White, 8.86% African American, 0.66% Native American, 0.63% Asian, 9.76% from other races, and 1.91% from two or more races. About 20.54% of the population were Hispanic or Latino of any race.

Of the 5,537 households, 32.2% had children under 18 living with them, 53.1% were married couples living together, 10.8% had a female householder with no husband present, and 32.3% were not families. About 29.0% of all households were made up of individuals, and 14.9% had someone living alone who was 65 or older. The average household size was 2.48, and the average family size was 3.07.

In the county, the age distribution was 27.9% under 18, 9.5% from 18 to 24, 24.8% from 25 to 44, 21.6% from 45 to 64, and 16.2% who were 65 or older. The median age was 36 years. For every 100 females, there were 98.0 males. For every 100 females 18 and over, there were 91.70 males. The median income in the county for a household was $29,500 and for a family was $38,685. Males had a median income of $26,001 versus $19,620 for females. The per capita income for the county was $16,520. About 9.0% of families and 13.1% of the population were below the poverty line, including 16.0% of those under 18 and 13.3% of those 65 or over.

== Communities ==
=== County seat ===
- Vernon (county seat)

=== Census-designated places ===
- Harrold
- Lockett
- Oklaunion

=== Unincorporated communities ===
- Odell

== Education ==
School districts serving sections of the county include:

- Chillicothe Independent School District
- Harrold Independent School District
- Northside Independent School District
- Vernon Independent School District

The county is in the service area of Vernon College.

== Notable people ==
- Clyde Gates, wide receiver for the New York Jets
- Jack English Hightower, Memphis, Texas, native; former member of both houses of the Texas State Legislature, and former U.S. representative
- Roy Orbison, singer/songwriter, was born in Wilbarger County.
- Daryl Richardson, running back for the St. Louis Rams
- Bernard Scott, running back for the Cincinnati Bengals
- Jack Teagarden, bandleader and trombonist
- John Clay Wolfe, American radio personality who began his career in Wilbarger County on KSEY

== Politics ==
Wilbarger County is located within District 69 of the Texas House of Representatives. Wilbarger County is located within District 28 of the Texas Senate.

United States presidential election results for Wilbarger County, Texas
Year	Republican		Democratic		Third party(ies)	
Year	No.	%	No.	%	No.	%
1912	44	3.38%	993	76.33%	264	20.29%
1916	99	6.79%	1,242	85.13%	118	8.09%
1920	335	21.73%	1,118	72.50%	89	5.77%
1924	269	17.05%	1,222	77.44%	87	5.51%
1928	1,590	52.30%	1,447	47.60%	3	0.10%
1932	199	5.51%	3,397	94.13%	13	0.36%
1936	316	8.75%	3,279	90.76%	18	0.50%
1940	697	17.64%	3,249	82.21%	6	0.15%
1944	517	11.70%	3,382	76.53%	520	11.77%
1948	529	13.92%	2,963	77.97%	308	8.11%
1952	3,019	53.28%	2,646	46.70%	1	0.02%
1956	2,230	48.62%	2,347	51.17%	10	0.22%
1960	2,796	54.51%	2,319	45.21%	14	0.27%
1964	1,539	32.45%	3,200	67.48%	3	0.06%
1968	1,909	36.73%	1,996	38.40%	1,293	24.87%
1972	3,183	70.44%	1,139	25.20%	197	4.36%
1976	2,145	39.17%	3,280	59.90%	51	0.93%
1980	3,031	55.48%	2,347	42.96%	85	1.56%
1984	3,644	64.23%	2,011	35.45%	18	0.32%
1988	2,669	54.15%	2,248	45.61%	12	0.24%
1992	1,959	36.69%	1,924	36.03%	1,457	27.28%
1996	2,037	47.73%	1,730	40.53%	501	11.74%
2000	3,138	68.56%	1,356	29.63%	83	1.81%
2004	3,685	73.85%	1,284	25.73%	21	0.42%
2008	3,283	72.81%	1,196	26.52%	30	0.67%
2012	2,956	74.27%	971	24.40%	53	1.33%
2016	3,166	77.13%	809	19.71%	130	3.17%
2020	3,524	77.90%	956	21.13%	44	0.97%
2024	3,566	79.83%	860	19.25%	41	0.92%

United States Senate election results for Wilbarger County, Texas1
Year	Republican		Democratic		Third party(ies)	
Year	No.	%	No.	%	No.	%
2024	3,419	77.13%	926	20.89%	88	1.99%

United States Senate election results for Wilbarger County, Texas2
Year	Republican		Democratic		Third party(ies)	
Year	No.	%	No.	%	No.	%
2020	3,473	78.59%	874	19.78%	72	1.63%

Texas Gubernatorial election results for Wilbarger County
Year	Republican		Democratic		Third party(ies)	
Year	No.	%	No.	%	No.	%
2022	2,606	82.68%	517	16.40%	29	0.92%

== See also ==
- List of museums in North Texas
- National Register of Historic Places listings in Wilbarger County, Texas
- Recorded Texas Historic Landmarks in Wilbarger County
