= Josiah P. Wilbarger =

American pioneer

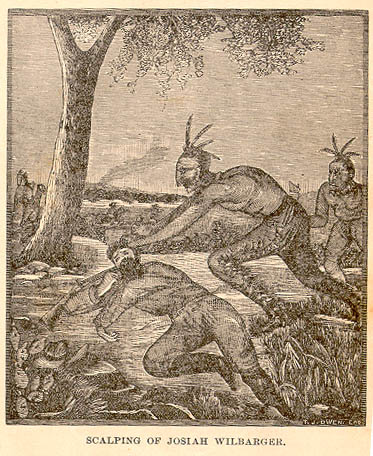
An interpretation of the scalping of Josiah Wilbarger

Josiah Pugh Wilbarger (September 10, 1801 – April 11, 1845) was an early Texan who lived for twelve years after being scalped by Comanche Indians.

== Early life ==
He was born in Rockingham County, Virginia, and moved to Kentucky in 1818. Wilbarger moved to Pike County, Missouri, in 1823 and married Margaret Barker in September 1827. They left for Texas soon after the wedding and reached what is now Matagorda County on December 26. Wilbarger was a teacher at Matagorda for a year before moving to La Grange, where he taught and surveyed until he settled in Stephen F. Austin's colony in a bend of the Colorado River, some ten miles above the site of present Bastrop, Texas.

== The scalping ==
In August 1833, Wilbarger was a member of a surveying party that was attacked by the Comanche about four miles east of the site of present Austin, Texas. Josiah and another man were struck by bullets and arrows and scalped by the Comanches. The third member managed to flee. A rescue party found Wilbarger, who had been left for dead, the next day.
