= Vernon High School (Vernon, Texas) =

Location
- 2102 Yucca Lane; Vernon, Wilbarger County, Texas 76384-4999; United States; 34.14796°N 99.311989°W

Information
- Type: Public, secondary
- School district: Vernon Independent School District
- Principal: Cynthia Jackson
- Staff: 34.11 (FTE)
- Grades: 9–12
- Enrollment: 481 (2023–2024)
- Student to teacher ratio: 14.10
- Colors: Maroon; White
- Athletics conference: UIL Class AAA
- Mascot: Lion/Lady Lion
- Website: vhs.vernonisd.org

Vernon High School is a 3A high school located in Vernon, Texas, United States. It is part of the Vernon Independent School District located in south central Wilbarger County. In 2013, the school was rated "Met Standard" by the Texas Education Agency.

== Athletics ==
The Vernon Lions compete in cross country, volleyball, football, wrestling, basketball, golf, competitive bass fishing, team and individual tennis, track, softball, and baseball.

=== State titles ===
- Football
  - 1990(3A)
- Girls basketball
  - 1985(3A)
- Boys track
  - 1998(3A) (tie)

==== State finalists ====
- Football
  - 1989(3A)
- Boys basketball
  - 1950(2A)

• Softball

-2018(4A)

State semifinalists

+ Softball

-2017(4a)

== Notable alumni ==
- Aston Whiteside, professional football player
