= Bernard Scott =

American football player (born 1984)

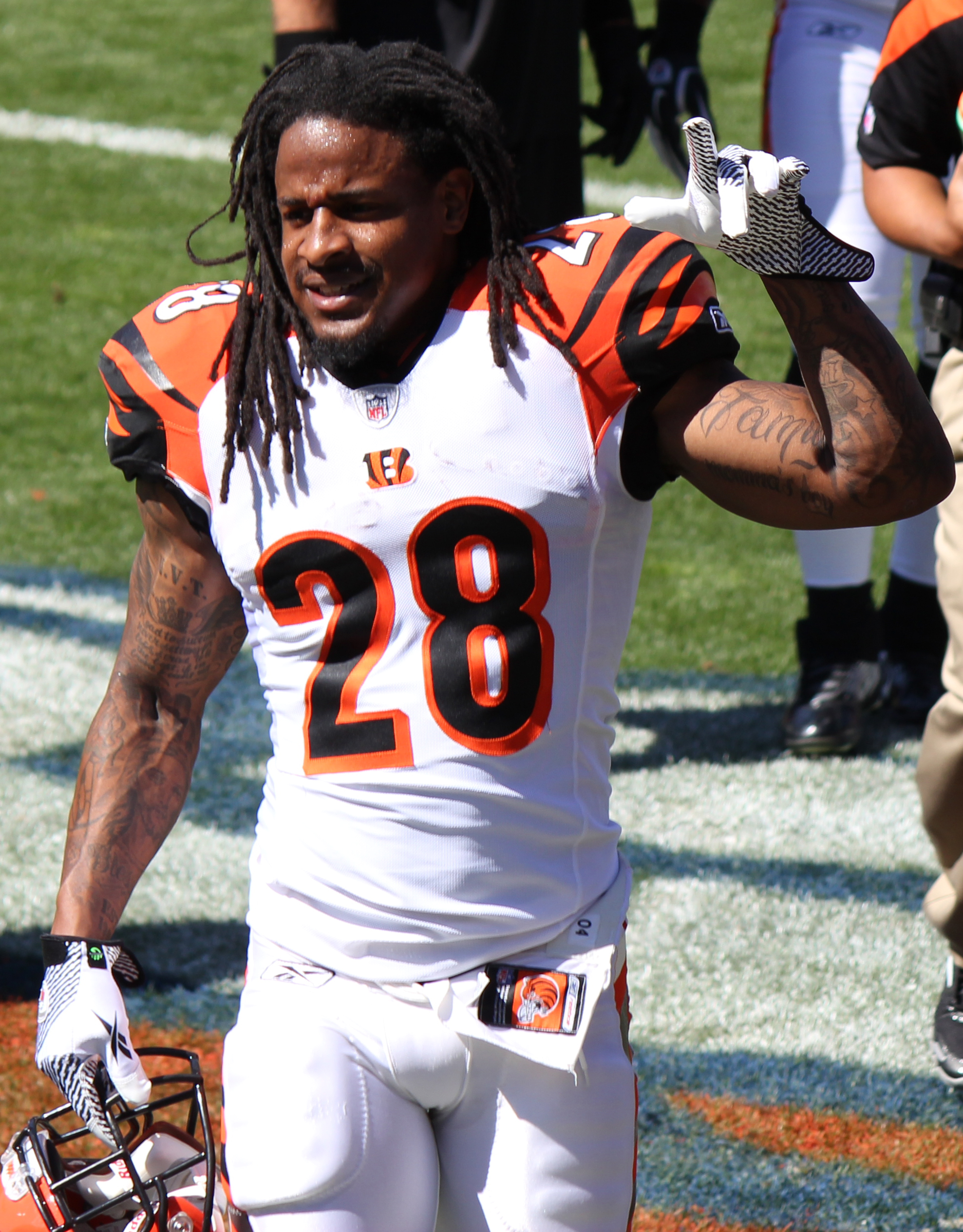
- Scott with the Cincinnati Bengals in 2011

No. 28, 34
- Position: Running back

Personal information
- Born: February 10, 1984 (age 42); Wichita Falls, Texas, U.S.
- Listed height: 5 ft 10 in (1.78 m)
- Listed weight: 195 lb (88 kg)

Career information
- High school: Vernon (Vernon, Texas)
- College: Central Arkansas (2004); Blinn (2005–2006); Abilene Christian (2007–2008)
- NFL draft: 2009: 6th round, 209th overall pick

Career history
- Cincinnati Bengals (2009–2012); Baltimore Ravens (2013); Toronto Argonauts (2015)*
- * Offseason or practice squad member only

Awards and highlights
- Harlon Hill Trophy (2008); Gulf South Conference Freshman of the Year (2004)

Career NFL statistics
- Rushing attempts: 259
- Rushing yards: 1,049
- Receptions: 31
- Receiving yards: 175
- Return yards: 1,787
- Total touchdowns: 5
- Stats at Pro Football Reference

Anthony Bernard Scott (born February 10, 1984) is an American former professional football player who was a running back in the National Football League (NFL). He was selected by the Cincinnati Bengals in the sixth round of the 2009 NFL draft. He played college football for the Abilene Christian Wildcats. His brother Daryl Richardson is also a former NFL running back.

== Early life ==
A native of Vernon, Texas, Scott had a troubled past. A Class 3A first-team all-state selection as a high school junior in 2001, Scott was kicked off his high school team at Vernon High School because of an off-campus fight after the season. He was not eligible for his senior year, and finally graduated from Wichita Falls High School in 2003.

== College career ==
He went on to attend Central Arkansas University, where he earned Gulf South Conference Freshman of the Year honors in 2004, but was eventually dismissed from the football team for hitting a coach, along with a few other issues. Scott transferred to Blinn College, where he was a first-team NJCAA All-America after leading the Buccaneers to a 12–0 season and the NJCAA national championship. Scott averaged 154.4 rushing yards per game, and he finished his only junior college season with a junior college-best 1,892 yards and 27 touchdowns. He was also first-team all Southwestern Junior College Football Conference.

Rated a three-star recruit by Rivals.com, Scott drew some interest by Arkansas and Fresno State, but eventually enrolled at Abilene Christian University in 2007. He had finished runner-up in the voting for the 2007 Harlon Hill Trophy to Danny Woodhead. In that year, Scott broke the league's single-season rushing record with 2,165 yards and set a pair of NCAA Division II single-season records with 39 total touchdowns and 234 points scored. In 2008, Scott won the Harlon Hill Trophy in a landslide, getting the third-highest vote total in the 23-year history of the trophy.

== Professional career ==
=== Pre-draft ===
Scott's NFL prospects were tarnished by his off-the-field issues. Besides his aforementioned trouble in high school and junior college, he was also arrested for some traffic-related misdemeanors, and was put on an 18-month probation for failing to identify himself during a traffic stop in Abilene in the spring of 2007.

Pre-draft measurables
Height	Weight	40-yard dash	10-yard split	20-yard split	20-yard shuttle	Three-cone drill	Vertical jump	Broad jump	Bench press	Wonderlic
5 ft 10 1/4 in (1.78 m)	200 lb (91 kg)	4.56 s	1.50 s	2.52 s	4.08 s	6.82 s	36 in (0.91 m)	10 ft 5 in (3.18 m)	21 reps	11
All values from NFL Combine

=== Cincinnati Bengals ===
Scott was selected 209th overall by the Cincinnati Bengals in the sixth round of the 2009 NFL Draft.

Following training camp, Scott made the active roster as a kick returner and as a backup to running back Cedric Benson. On November 15, 2009, Scott returned a kickoff 96 yards for a touchdown against the Pittsburgh Steelers, which earned him AFC Special Teams Player of the Week honors.

In his first career start, in week 11 against the Oakland Raiders, Scott rushed for 119 yards, including a 61-yard run that was the longest by a Bengal since Corey Dillon's 67-yard rush at Cleveland on September 15, 2002. He also became the first Bengals rookie to rush for 100 yards in a game since Dillon in 1997.

=== Baltimore Ravens ===
Scott signed with the Baltimore Ravens on October 28, 2013. On December 7, 2013, the Ravens released Scott. On December 10, after a season-ending injury to Brandon Stokley, Scott re-signed with the Ravens.

=== Toronto Argonauts ===
On March 3, 2015, Scott signed with the Toronto Argonauts of the Canadian Football League. He retired in May 2015.
