= Daryl Richardson =

American football player (born 1990)

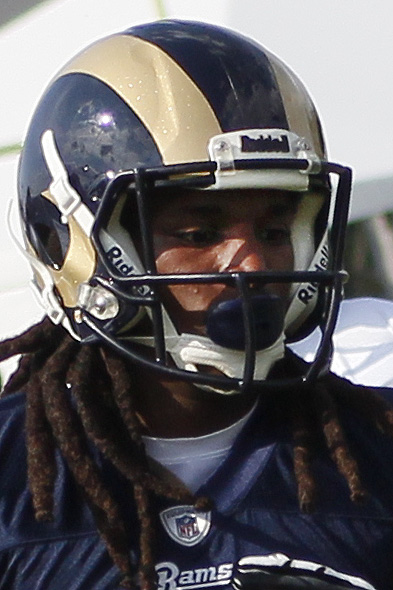
- Richardson with the St. Louis Rams in 2013

No. 26, 38
- Position: Running back

Personal information
- Born: April 12, 1990 (age 36); Vernon, Texas, U.S.
- Listed height: 5 ft 10 in (1.78 m)
- Listed weight: 192 lb (87 kg)

Career information
- High school: Sandalwood (Jacksonville, Florida)
- College: Cisco (2008); Abilene Christian (2009–2011)
- NFL draft: 2012: 7th round, 252nd overall pick

Career history
- St. Louis Rams (2012–2013); New York Jets (2014–2015)*; Houston Texans (2015)*; Cleveland Browns (2015); Pittsburgh Steelers (2016); Jacksonville Jaguars (2016); Indianapolis Colts (2017)*; San Antonio Commanders (2019)*
- * Offseason or practice squad member only

Career NFL statistics
- Rushing attempts: 169
- Rushing yards: 697
- Receptions: 38
- Receiving yards: 284
- Stats at Pro Football Reference

Daryl Lashay Richardson (born April 12, 1990) is an American former professional football player who was a running back in the National Football League (NFL). He was selected by the St. Louis Rams in the seventh round of the 2012 NFL draft. He played college football for the Abilene Christian Wildcats.

== College career ==
Richardson attended Cisco College in 2008, a local Texas community college where he rushed for 526 yards and 7 touchdowns on 95 attempts.

Richardson then transferred to Abilene Christian University, which he attended from 2009 to 2011. Appearing in 34 games with 23 starts for the Wildcats, Richardson amassed 2,303 yards on 453 carries with 34 touchdowns.

== Professional career ==
Pre-draft measurables
Height	Weight	Arm length	Hand span	40-yard dash	10-yard split	20-yard split	20-yard shuttle	Three-cone drill	Vertical jump	Broad jump	Bench press
5 ft 10 3/8 in (1.79 m)	192 lb (87 kg)	30 5/8 in (0.78 m)	9 1/8 in (0.23 m)	4.47 s	1.57 s	2.54 s	4.36 s	7.07 s	40 1/2 in (1.03 m)	11 ft 3 in (3.43 m)	16 reps
All values from Abilene Christian Pro Day

=== St. Louis Rams ===
Richardson was selected in the seventh round (252nd overall) of the 2012 NFL draft. He was picked second to last in the draft, the only player behind him was Northern Illinois quarterback Chandler Harnish, who was selected by the Indianapolis Colts with the 253rd pick.

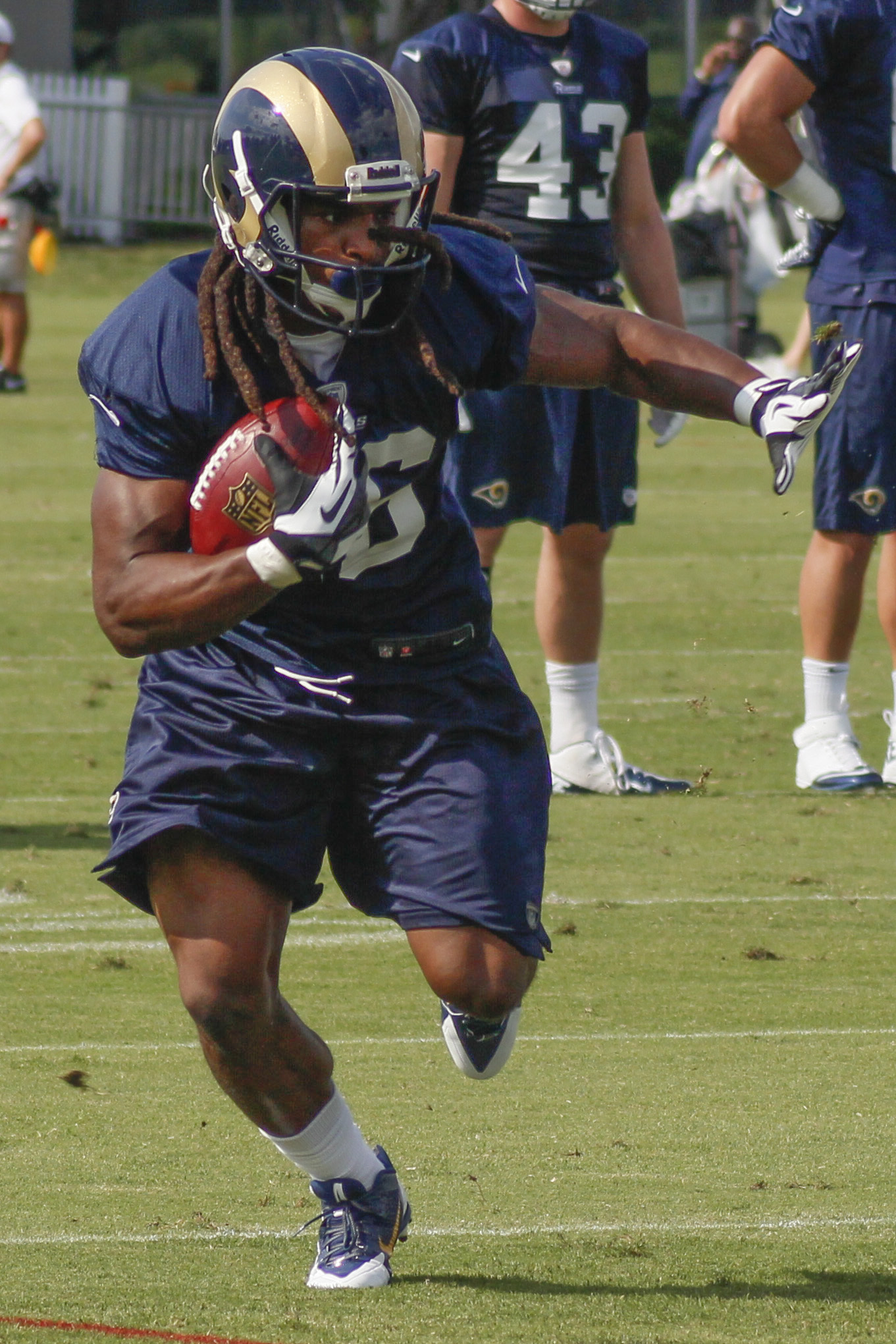
Richardson during 2013 Rams training Camp.

On June 6, 2012, Richardson signed a four-year contract with the Rams worth $2.15 million. During his rookie campaign, he was the primary backup to then Rams starting running back Steven Jackson over fellow draftee, second-round pick Isaiah Pead. Richardson played in all 16 games, gaining 475 rushing yards on 98 attempts, as well as 24 receptions for 163 yards. His best performance came in Week 2 of the regular season against the Washington Redskins when he rushed 15 times for 83 yards and scored a 2-point conversion.

Richardson was waived by the Rams on May 15, 2014.

=== New York Jets ===
Richardson was claimed off waivers by the New York Jets on May 16, 2014. He was released on August 30, 2014, but signed to the team's practice squad a day later. Richardson was signed a to reserve/future contract on December 30, 2014. The Jets released Richardson as part of their final roster cuts following the 2015 preseason.

=== Houston Texans ===
The Houston Texans signed Richardson to their practice squad on September 23, 2015, before releasing him on October 20. The Houston Texans signed Richardson to their practice squad again on October 28, 2015.

=== Cleveland Browns ===
Richardson signed with the Cleveland Browns on December 15, 2015. Richardson was inactive for 2 games after being signed. The Cleveland Browns waived Richardson on December 28, 2015.

=== Pittsburgh Steelers ===
On January 20, 2016, the Pittsburgh Steelers signed Richardson to a future/reserve contract. He was released by the Steelers on September 29, 2016, and was signed to the Steelers' practice squad on October 3. He was promoted to the active roster on November 19, 2016. He was released on December 24, 2016.

=== Jacksonville Jaguars ===
Richardson was claimed off waivers by the Jaguars on December 26, 2016. On May 1, 2017, he was released by the Jaguars.

=== Indianapolis Colts ===
On August 29, 2017, Richardson signed with the Indianapolis Colts. He was released by the team on September 2, 2017.

=== San Antonio Commanders ===
On January 30, 2019, Richardson was released by the Commanders as part of the final training camp cuts.

== Personal life ==
Richardson is the brother of running back Bernard Scott, and cousin of wide receiver Clyde Gates. Richardson married Morgan Myrick, his college sweetheart, at Abilene Christian University on March 21, 2015.
