= Vernon, Texas =

- City
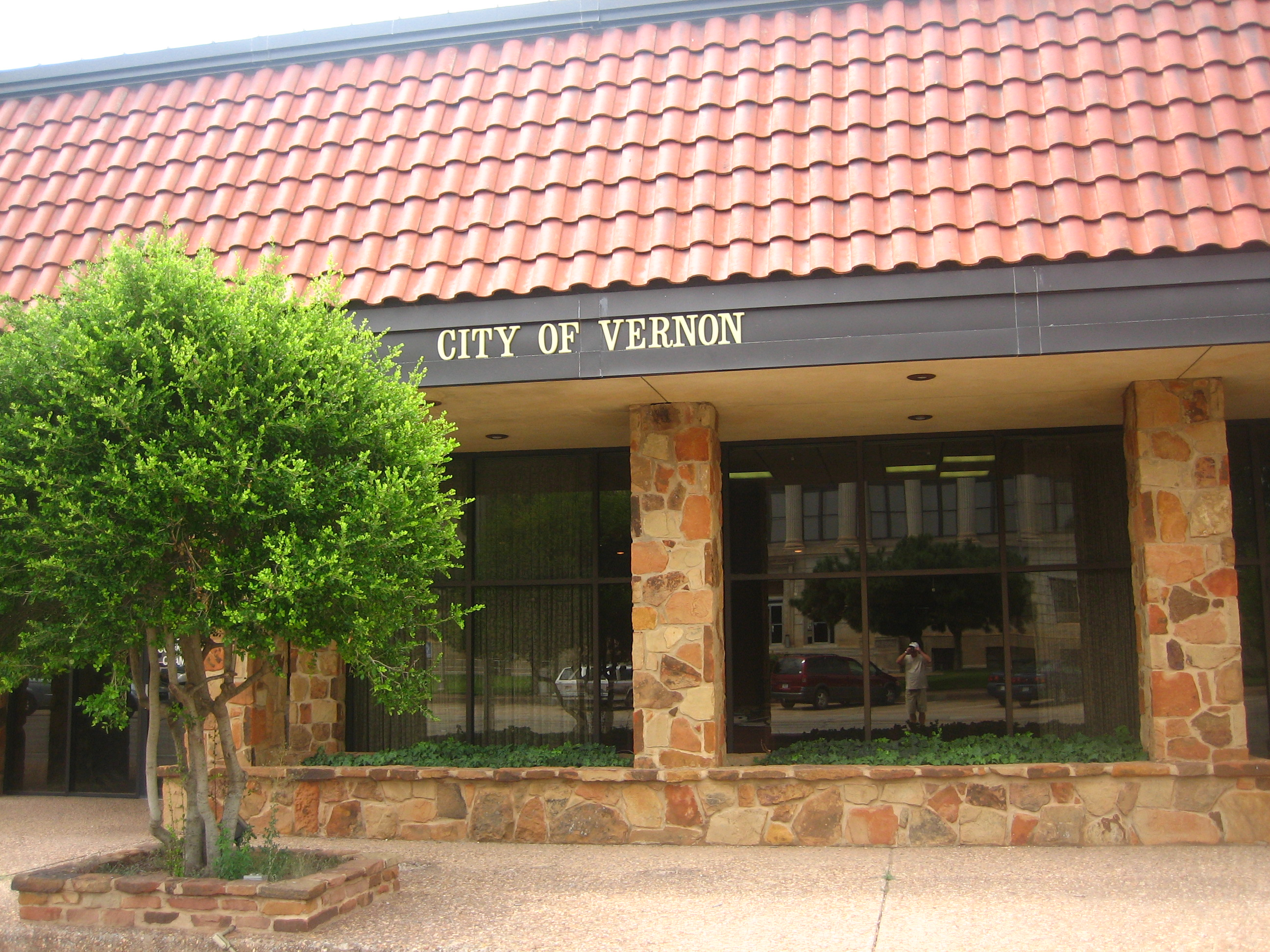
- Vernon City Hall
- Motto: "Steer Our Way!"
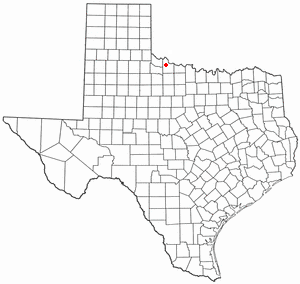
- Location of Vernon, Texas

- Coordinates: 34°08′53″N 99°18′00″W
- Country: United States
- State: Texas
- County: Wilbarger

Government
  - Type: Mayor–city commission

Area
  - Total: 7.90 sq mi (20.47 km^{2})
  - Land: 7.90 sq mi (20.45 km^{2})
  - Water: 0.0077 sq mi (0.02 km^{2})
- Elevation: 1,240 ft (380 m)

Population (2020)
  - Total: 10,078
  - Density: 1,276/sq mi (492.8/km^{2})
- Time zone: UTC-6 (Central (CST))
  - Summer (DST): UTC-5 (CDT)
- ZIP Codes: 76384–76385
- Area code: 940
- FIPS code: 48-75308
- GNIS feature ID: 2412151
- Website: www.vernontx.gov

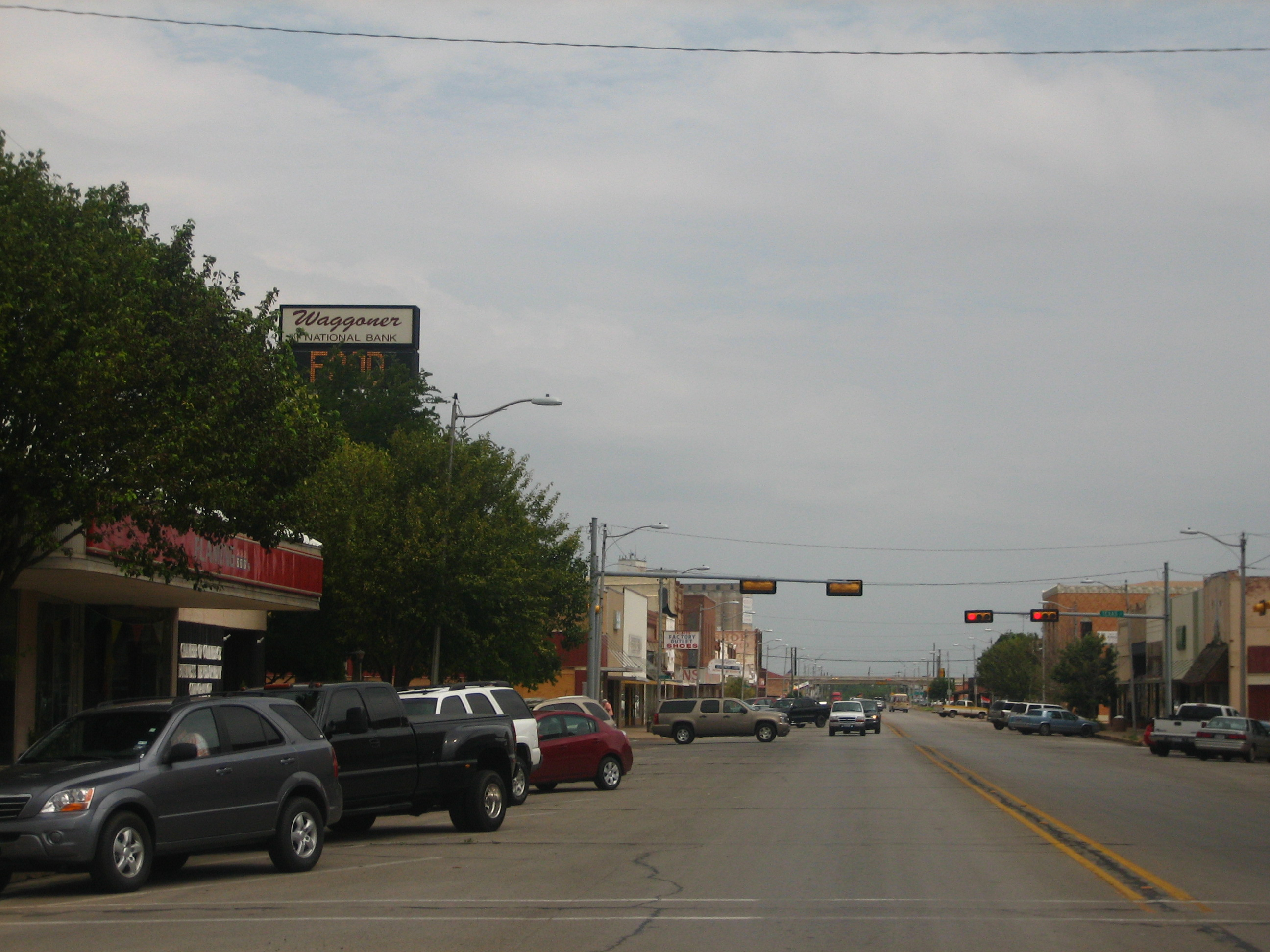
A glimpse of downtown Vernon, with Waggoner National Bank in the left background

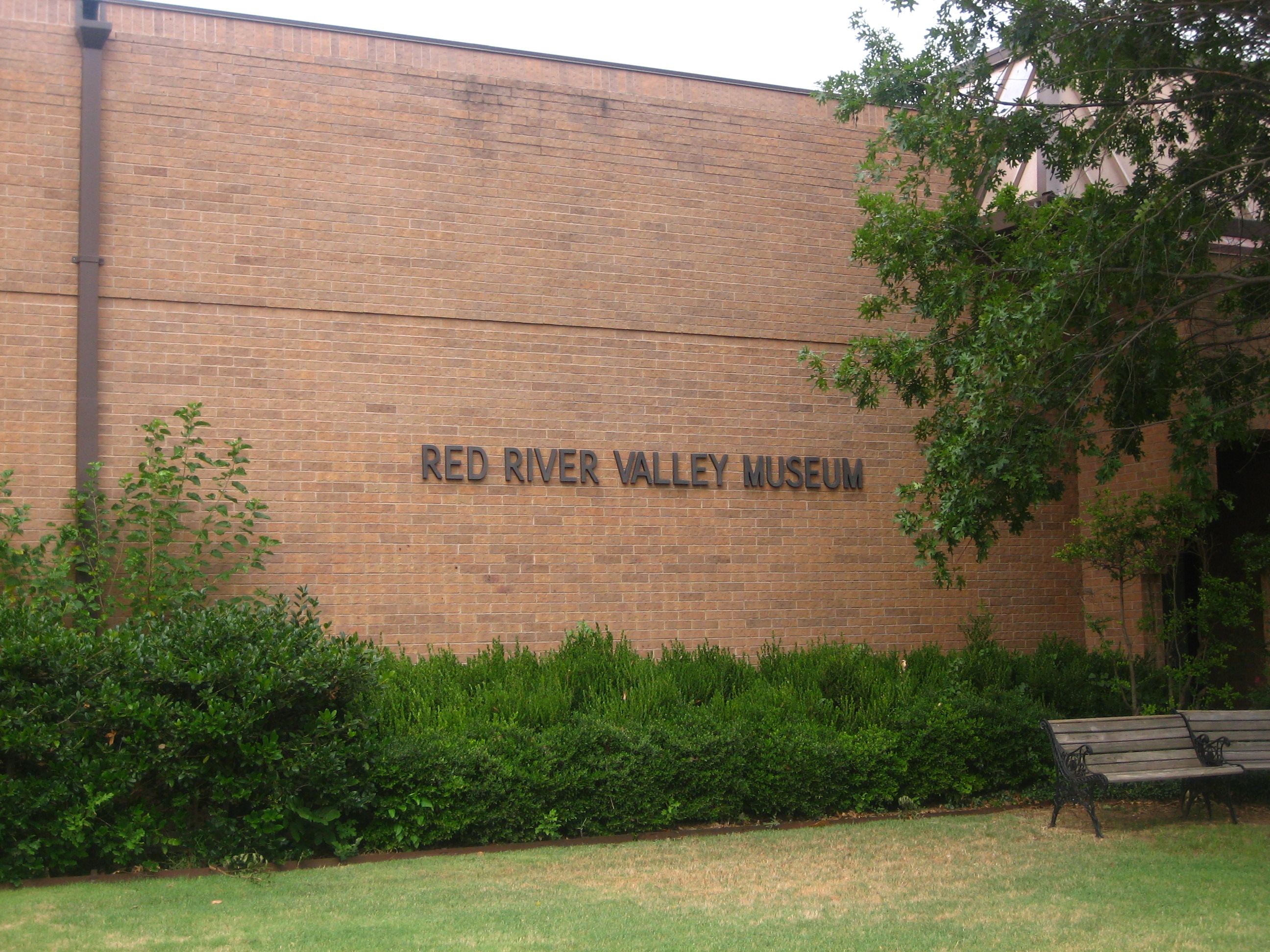
The Red River Valley Museum is located on the Vernon College campus.

Vernon is a city and the county seat of Wilbarger County, Texas, United States. As of the 2020 census, Vernon had a population of 10,078.

== History ==
The original town was called Eagle Springs by the indigenous community as early as 1858. After the American Civil War, more settlers began moving into the area, and in 1880, they applied for a post office as Eagle Flat. However, the U.S. Post Office rejected the name, saying too many Texas towns were already called Eagle something. The town then chose the name Vernon, after George Washington's home, Mount Vernon.

== Geography ==
According to the United States Census Bureau, the city has a total area of 8.1 sq mi (21.0 km^{2}), of which 0.12% is covered by water.

=== Climate ===
The climate in this area is characterized by hot, humid summers and generally mild to cool winters. According to the Köppen climate classification, Vernon has a humid subtropical climate, Cfa on climate maps.

Climate data for Vernon, Texas (1991–2020)
Month	Jan	Feb	Mar	Apr	May	Jun	Jul	Aug	Sep	Oct	Nov	Dec	Year
Mean daily maximum °F (°C)	54.7 (12.6)	58.5 (14.7)	67.9 (19.9)	76.2 (24.6)	84.5 (29.2)	92.6 (33.7)	97.2 (36.2)	96.5 (35.8)	88.1 (31.2)	77.9 (25.5)	65.1 (18.4)	55.8 (13.2)	76.3 (24.6)
Daily mean °F (°C)	41.7 (5.4)	44.9 (7.2)	54.4 (12.4)	62.3 (16.8)	72.1 (22.3)	80.7 (27.1)	84.9 (29.4)	84.1 (28.9)	75.9 (24.4)	64.6 (18.1)	52.3 (11.3)	43.2 (6.2)	63.4 (17.5)
Mean daily minimum °F (°C)	28.7 (−1.8)	31.3 (−0.4)	40.9 (4.9)	48.3 (9.1)	59.8 (15.4)	68.9 (20.5)	72.6 (22.6)	71.7 (22.1)	63.8 (17.7)	51.4 (10.8)	39.4 (4.1)	30.6 (−0.8)	50.6 (10.4)
Average precipitation inches (mm)	1.15 (29)	1.18 (30)	2.09 (53)	2.57 (65)	3.67 (93)	4.10 (104)	2.37 (60)	2.80 (71)	3.04 (77)	2.53 (64)	1.60 (41)	1.26 (32)	28.36 (719)
Average snowfall inches (cm)	0.9 (2.3)	0.3 (0.76)	0.0 (0.0)	0.0 (0.0)	0.0 (0.0)	0.0 (0.0)	0.0 (0.0)	0.0 (0.0)	0.0 (0.0)	0.0 (0.0)	0.0 (0.0)	0.0 (0.0)	1.2 (3.06)
Source: NOAA

== Demographics ==
Historical population
Census	Pop.	Note	%±
1890	2,857		—
1900	1,993		−30.2%
1910	3,195		60.3%
1920	5,142		60.9%
1930	9,137		77.7%
1940	9,277		1.5%
1950	12,651		36.4%
1960	12,141		−4.0%
1970	11,454		−5.7%
1980	12,695		10.8%
1990	12,001		−5.5%
2000	11,660		−2.8%
2010	11,002		−5.6%
2020	10,078		−8.4%
U.S. Decennial Census

=== 2020 census ===
As of the 2020 census, Vernon had a population of 10,078, 4,005 households, and 2,426 families residing in the city.

The median age was 38.4 years. 24.1% of residents were under the age of 18 and 18.5% of residents were 65 years of age or older. For every 100 females there were 91.5 males, and for every 100 females age 18 and over there were 89.7 males.

93.1% of residents lived in urban areas, while 6.9% lived in rural areas.

There were 4,005 households in Vernon, of which 30.0% had children under the age of 18 living in them. Of all households, 40.8% were married-couple households, 20.7% were households with a male householder and no spouse or partner present, and 31.8% were households with a female householder and no spouse or partner present. About 32.6% of all households were made up of individuals and 13.1% had someone living alone who was 65 years of age or older.

There were 4,754 housing units, of which 15.8% were vacant. The homeowner vacancy rate was 2.4% and the rental vacancy rate was 16.2%.

Racial composition as of the 2020 census
Race	Number	Percent
White	5,884	58.4%
Black or African American	863	8.6%
American Indian and Alaska Native	157	1.6%
Asian	543	5.4%
Native Hawaiian and Other Pacific Islander	0	0.0%
Some other race	1,459	14.5%
Two or more races	1,172	11.6%
Hispanic or Latino (of any race)	3,243	32.2%

=== 2000 census ===
As of the census of 2000, 11,660 people, 4,506 households, and 2,946 families were residing in the city. The population density was 1,439.2 people/sq mi (555.8/km^{2}). The 5,166 housing units averaged 637.6/sq mi (246.2/km^{2}). The racial makeup of the city was 76.33% White, 9.65% African American, 0.69% Native American, 0.71% Asian, 10.74% from other races, and 1.89% from two or more races. Hispanics or Latinos of any race were 22.39% of the population.

Of the 4,506 households, 31.3% had children under 18 living with them, 49.7% were married couples living together, 11.9% had a female householder with no husband present, and 34.6% were not families. About 31.2% of all households were made up of individuals, and 16.4% had someone living alone who was 65 or older. The average household size was 2.44, and the average family size was 3.07.

In the city, the age distribution was 26.6% under 18, 10.1% from 18 to 24, 25.2% from 25 to 44, 20.9% from 45 to 64, and 17.2% who were 65 or older. The median age was 36 years. For every 100 females, there were 92.4 males. For every 100 females age 18 and over, there were 88.4 males.

The median income for a household in the city was $28,194, and for a family was $36,913. Males had a median income of $25,167 versus $18,971 for females. The per capita income for the city was $15,747. About 10.2% of families and 14.1% of the population were below the poverty line, including 17.2% of those under 18 and 14.6% of those age 65 or over.

== Economy ==
In 1905, the Wichita Mill and Elevator Company, owned and managed by entrepreneur Frank Kell of Wichita Falls, bought a mill in Vernon. Kell's business partner was W. O. Anderson.

Major businesses and industries in Vernon include a Tyson Foods (formerly Wright Brand Foods) bacon-processing plant, a Rhodia, Inc. guar-processing plant, North Texas State Hospital, which is operated by the Texas Health and Human Services System, the Adolescent Forensic Program, a maximum security residential treatment program for youth aged 13-17 (formerly the Victory Field Correctional Academy, operated by the Texas Youth Commission), and the Texas AgriLife (Texas A&M System) Research and Extension Center.

The nearby Waggoner Ranch holds the distinction of being the largest spread in Texas under one fence. The ranch remains operational, with business in petroleum, farming, horses, and cattle. The Waggoner produces some of the best ranch horses in Texas, many from the breeding of the quarter horse Poco Bueno. According to the wishes of E. Paul Waggoner, Poco Bueno is buried in a standing position on the corner at the main entrance to the ranch.

== Arts and culture ==
=== Summer’s Last Blast ===
Otherwise known as “Cruise Night” is held the second weekend of August every year - a car show that exhibits a variety of 1930s to 1985 model cars.

=== Santa Rosa Roundup Rodeo ===
Vernon is host to various events annually, including the four-day Santa Rosa Roundup rodeo in May, which is sponsored by the local Santa Rosa Palomino Club.

=== Doan's May Picnic ===
Since 1884, Doan's May Picnic has been held on the first Saturday of May at the ghost town of Doans, located 15 miles north of Vernon. A barbecue lunch and T-shirts are available for sale, and a king and queen are crowned at the annual event. One of the shirts for 2017 featured a design by Harold Dow Bugbee, the late curator of the Panhandle-Plains Historical Museum in Canyon, Texas, which depicts Texas Longhorns and a cowboy crossing the Red River at Doan's Crossing, where the postmaster Corwin F. Doan (1848–1929) also operated a store to supply the cowboys. Bugbee's sculpture is part of the 1931 Trail Drivers Monument located at Doans. Riders cross the river from Oklahoma and usually arrive just before noon. The 1881 adobe house, the oldest in Wilbarger County, is open for tours during the picnic.

== Education ==
=== Public education ===
The Vernon Independent School District serves students in prekindergarten through grade 12. The district's school campuses include three elementary schools (prekindergarten through grade 5), a middle school (grades 6–8) and Vernon High School (grades 9–12). The district also operates an alternative-education program and an education program for juveniles of the Adolescent Forensic Program at North Texas State Hospital

Vernon High School's football team, the Vernon Lions, was one of the strongest programs in the 3A division until recently. The Lions won the 3A state championship in 1990 and were ranked number one all year.

Vernon High School's first team state championship came in the 1984–1985 season as the Lady Lions won the 3A girls basketball state title.

Vernon High School is also known for its tennis team, which has completed 23 straight years of going to the Texas Tennis Coaches Association State Team Tennis Tournament. VHS Tennis has six TTCA state team tennis titles and has finished no lower than third place in 22 of the 23 years.

=== Vernon College ===
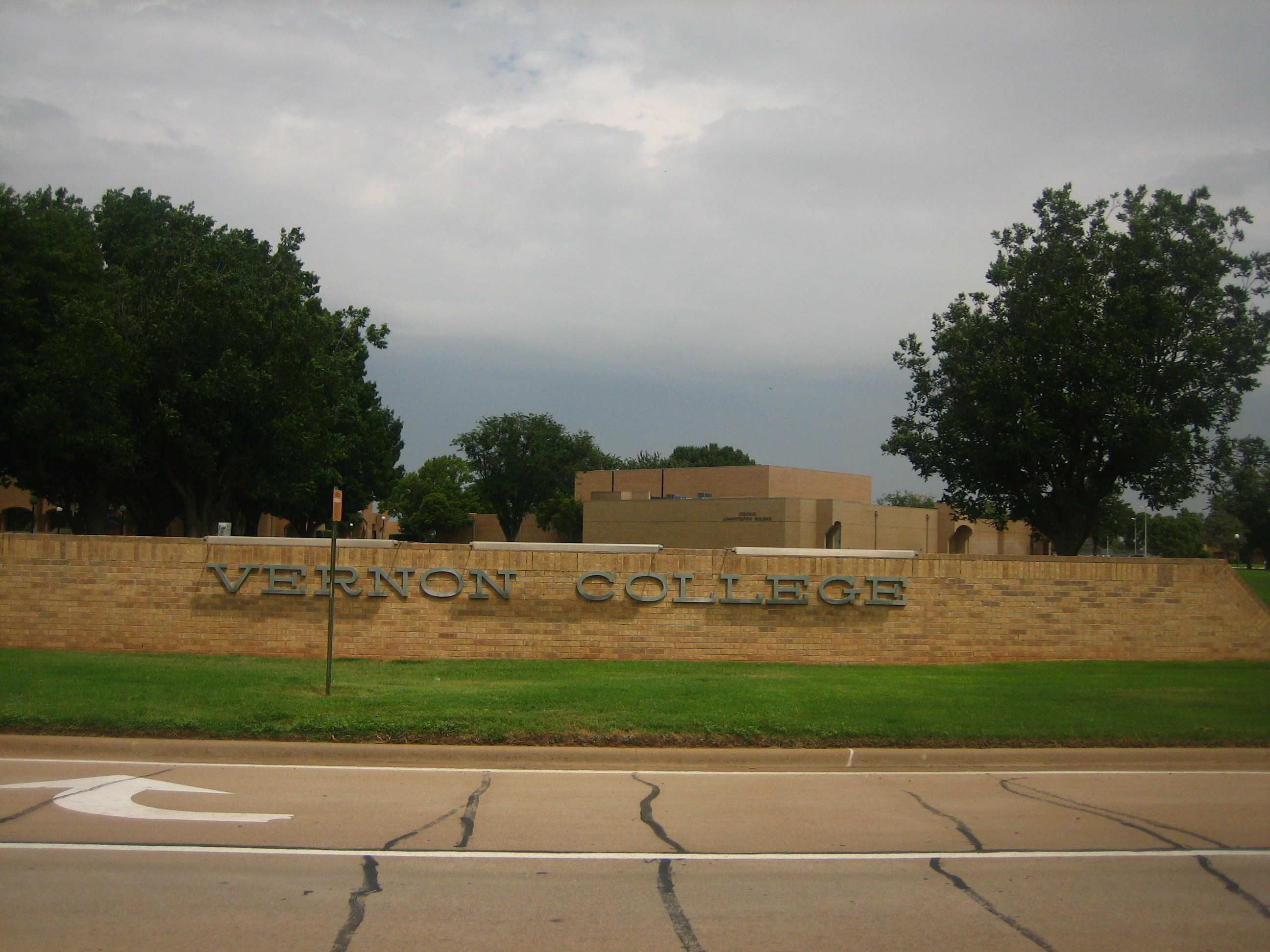
Vernon College is a community college in Vernon.

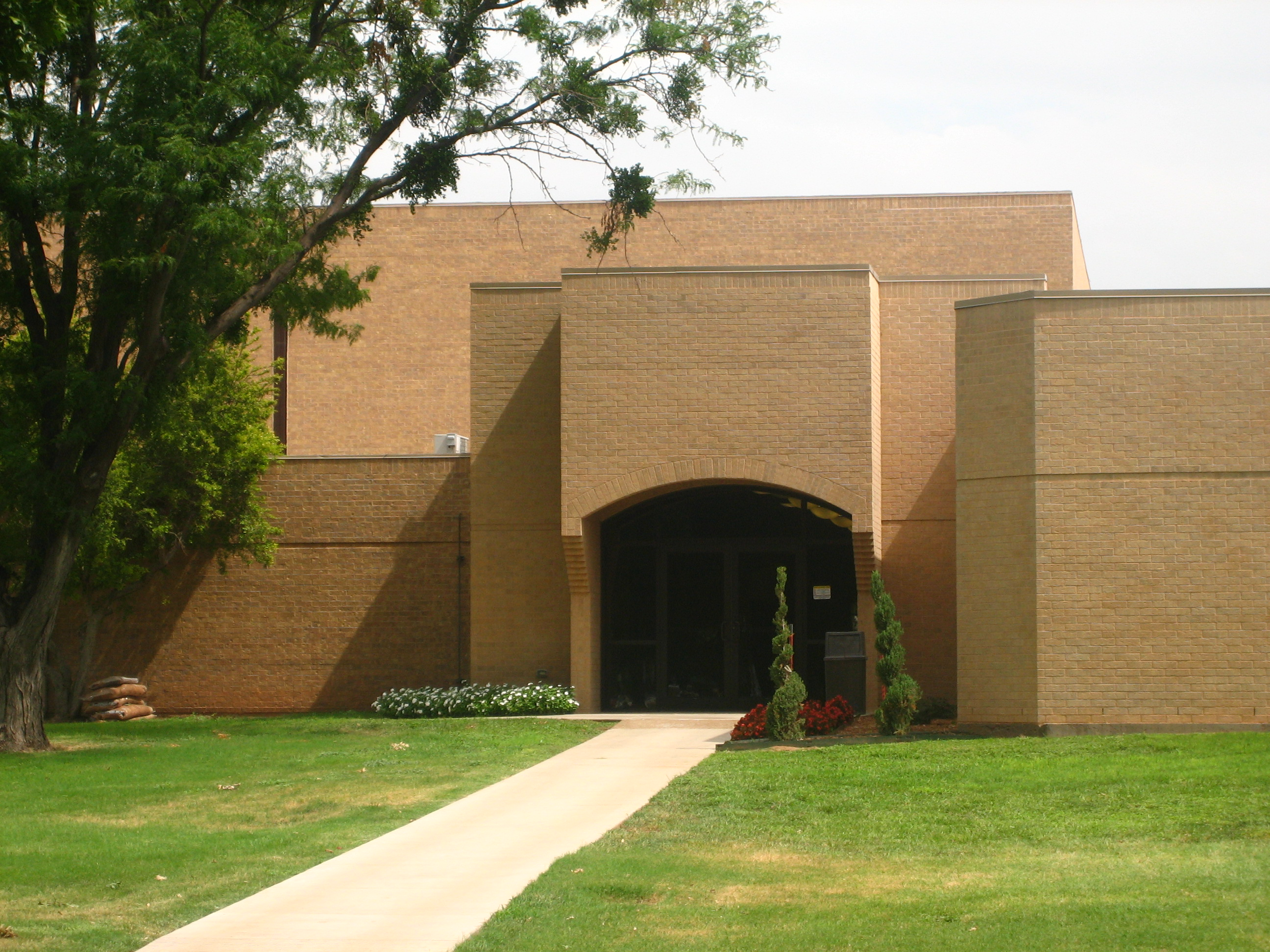
Osborne Administration Building at Vernon College

Vernon College, a two-year community college, is located here and maintains a branch campus in Wichita Falls. Academic offerings include cosmetology, nursing, and vocational-technical programs. Athletically, Vernon College fields women's softball, women's volleyball, men's baseball, and rodeo teams. The rodeo team is consistently ranked high in junior college-level competition.

== Infrastructure ==
=== Transportation ===
Vernon is located 50 miles northwest of Wichita Falls, and about 160 to 180 miles from surrounding metropolitan areas, including Amarillo, Abilene, Oklahoma City, and the DFW Metroplex. The city is served by four U.S. routes: 70, 183, 283, and 287.

Wilbarger County Airport is located five miles north of Vernon; the nearest airport with scheduled flights is Wichita Falls Municipal Airport, 50 miles to the east, which predominantly offers flights of commuter airlines to Dallas-Fort Worth International Airport.

The nearest international airports from Vernon with major airline connections include Dallas-Fort Worth International Airport, Will Rogers World Airport in Oklahoma City, and Rick Husband Amarillo International Airport in Amarillo.

The area is also served by a BNSF rail freight line bypassing downtown from Fort Worth to Amarillo.

== Notable people ==
- Kay Adams (born 1941), country singer
- Skandor Akbar, former professional wrestler in the Universal Wrestling Federation
- James Dixon, former professional football player for the Dallas Cowboys
- Robert L. Duncan (born 1953), Republican former member of Texas House of Representatives and Texas State Senate
- Roy C. Farrell (1912–1996), co-founder of Cathay Pacific
- Lawrence Gaines, former professional football player for Detroit Lions
- Clyde Gates (born 1986), NFL player for the Miami Dolphins
- Robert Gauldin (born 1931), classical music composer
- Rick Hardcastle (born 1956), Republican former member of Texas House of Representatives
- Jerry Haymes (born 1940), musician
- Bill Herchman, former professional football player
- Jack English Hightower (born 1926), politician, former 46th Judicial District Attorney
- Dan Kubiak (1938–1998), politician; taught and coached in Vernon in 1962–1963 academic year
- John C. Morgan (1914–1991), World War II United States Army Air Forces B-17 pilot and Medal of Honor recipient
- Roy Orbison (1936–1988), nicknamed "The Big O," Orbison was a Grammy Award-winning singer-songwriter and guitarist
- Marguerite Oswald (1907–1981), mother of Lee Harvey Oswald
- Mac Percival, former professional football player for Chicago Bears and Dallas Cowboys
- Daryl Richardson (born 1990), NFL running back for the Cleveland Browns
- Eck Robertson (1887–1975), fiddle player, first country musician to be commercially recorded (1922)
- Cory Roper (born 1977), NASCAR Camping World Truck Series driver
- Bernard Scott (born 1984), former NFL running back for the Cincinnati Bengals
- Ken Starr, lead prosecutor in Clinton impeachment
- Jack Teagarden (1905–1964), influential jazz trombonist and vocalist

== 1979 tornado ==
On April 10, 1979, Vernon and surrounding Wilbarger County were struck by an F4 tornado, a part of a large storm in the Red River Valley. Much of Vernon was damaged or destroyed, and 11 people were killed as the tornado passed through Foard and Wilbarger Counties before it dissipated in a rural portion of Tillman County, Oklahoma. That same day, tornadoes also devastated the larger nearby cities of Wichita Falls and Lawton.

== See also ==
- Vernon Plaza Theatre
