= Clifton McNeely =

American basketball player and coach

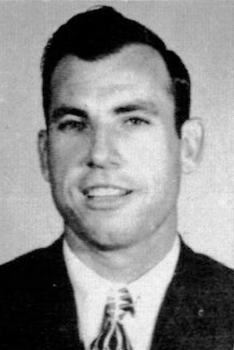
- McNeely in 1947

Personal information
- Born: June 22, 1919 Greenwood, Texas, U.S.
- Died: December 26, 2003 (aged 84) Irving, Texas, U.S.
- Listed height: 5 ft 10 in (1.78 m)

Career information
- High school: Greenwood (Greenwood, Texas); Slidell (Slidell, Texas)
- College: Dallas Baptist (1939–1940); Texas Wesleyan (1940–1942, 1946–1947)
- BAA draft: 1947: 1st round, 1st overall pick
- Drafted by: Pittsburgh Ironmen
- Position: Forward
- Coaching career: 1948–1960

Career history

Coaching
- 1948–1960: Pampa HS

Career highlights
- Third-team All-American – Helms (1947); First-team All-NAIA (1947)
- Stats at Basketball Reference

Clyde Clifton McNeely (June 22, 1919 – December 26, 2003) was an American basketball player and coach. A 5 ft 10 in (1.78 m) forward, he played college basketball for the Texas Wesleyan Rams for three seasons and led the National Association of Intercollegiate Athletics (NAIA) in scoring during his senior season in 1946–47. McNeely was the first player ever drafted in the National Basketball Association (NBA) when he was selected by the Pittsburgh Ironmen as the first pick of the league's inaugural 1947 draft. He never played professional basketball and instead pursued a coaching career at Pampa High School in Texas.

== Early life ==
McNeely was born in Greenwood, Texas, to Albert McNeely (1883–1948) and Fannie Lee Clifton (1883–1972). His father was an ordained deacon in the Greenwood Baptist Church. McNeely had two brothers: one, William Floyd, died at the age of two.

McNeely attended Greenwood High School for three years before transferring to Slidell High School in Slidell, Texas for his senior year. McNeely graduated in 1937.

== College and military career ==
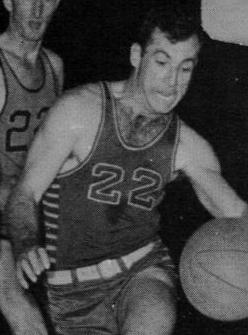
McNeely dribbling the ball during a game in the 1946–47 season

McNeely first attended Decatur Baptist Junior College, where he set high-scoring records on the school's basketball team. He transferred to Texas Wesleyan University in 1940, but his "shot-crazy" style created doubt as to how well he could fit on the team. During his first season at Texas Wesleyan in 1940–41, McNeely established himself as one of the most talented players on the team and was named team captain for the 1941–42 season. He helped guide Texas Wesleyan to an undefeated record during the 1941–42 regular season, with the team's only two defeats coming in the postseason against Sam Houston State in the Southwestern AAU Tournament and San Diego in the Kansas City National Intercollegiate Basketball Tournament.

In October 1942, McNeely enlisted to serve with the United States Army Air Corps in World War II. During his service, he played basketball with the Fort Worth Army Air Field team from 1943 to 1944, and then with the Randolph Field team in 1945. He was discharged on December 31, 1945. During 1946, McNeely played with the Globe Aircraft team. McNeely received professional basketball contract offers following his discharge, including a "dollar, two eighty a game" deal with the Leonards "B" team, but elected to return to Texas Wesleyan for the 1946–47 season. He was named team co-captain alongside Hardy Fortenberry. Before the season's start, Texas Wesleyan coach Johnny Edwards stated that McNeely had a good future in professional basketball and could play professionally after he graduated.

By the start of 1947, McNeely, nicknamed "The Man of a Million Shots", was leading the nation in scoring by a margin of 116 points. He missed three games in January 1947 after suffering a fractured wrist. McNeely led his team to a school-best 30–4 record, won the conference championship and earned third-team All-American honors after leading the NAIA in scoring with 725 points. He was named to the All-NAIA first-team alongside teammate E. F. Parham. McNeely held the Texas Wesleyan single season scoring record for 62 years until Chris Berry had 740 points in the 2008–09 season. Regarded as a "deadly" free throw shooter, he also held the Texas Wesleyan record for most free throws made with 213 until that too was surpassed by Berry in the 2008–09 season with 216.

McNeely studied Administrative Education at Texas Wesleyan, and completed his master's degree after returning to the university in 1953.

== BAA draft ==
McNeely was selected with the first pick of the inaugural 1947 BAA draft by the Pittsburgh Ironmen, becoming the first player ever drafted in the National Basketball Association. The Ironmen had earned the first pick in the draft after attaining a 14–45 record in the first season of the Basketball Association of America. However, McNeely was not interested in signing with the team, and ultimately never played a game of professional basketball. McNeely and Gene Melchiorre of the 1951 NBA draft are the only two number-one draft picks in NBA history to never play basketball professionally. The Pittsburgh Ironmen ultimately folded before the start of the 1947–48 season.

== Coaching career ==
After working for the Phillips 66 in Bartlesville, Oklahoma for four months in 1947 (and by extension, briefly playing for the Phillips 66ers industrial team), McNeely returned to Texas and became the head basketball coach at Pampa High School in Pampa, Texas in 1948. He led the Harvesters to state titles in 1953, 1954, 1958 and 1959. Pampa had a 72-game winning streak from 1952 to 1955. McNeely was offered coaching positions at Texas universities including University of Texas at Austin, Rice University and University of Texas at El Paso, but elected to stay at Pampa. He left the Harvesters with a head coaching record of 320–43.

== Personal life ==
McNeely married Peggy Jean Gallagher, who was a fellow student at Texas Wesleyan, on June 14, 1947, in Cisco, Texas. Peggy worked as a teacher at Pampa High School during her husband's tenure there. The couple had three children: twin sons Phillip and Michael, and daughter Sheryl. McNeely's two sons played together at Denton High School where he was the principal and they would both go on to become high school basketball coaches.

== Later life and death ==
McNeely worked in school administration following his retirement from coaching in 1960. He served as an assistant principal at Castleberry High School, principal at Bridgeport High School and Denton High School, and administrator at Irving Independent School District before retiring in 1985.

McNeely died December 26, 2003, at the age of 84.

McNeely was inducted into the Texas High School Basketball Hall of Fame, the Slidell ISD Hall of Fame, the Panhandle Sports Hall of Fame and the Texas Wesleyan University Hall of Fame. Pampa's gymnasium was renamed McNeely Fieldhouse in his honor after his retirement. Former members of the Pampa basketball teams he coached founded the Clifton McNeely Endowed Scholarship in 2002.
