= Slidell =

Slidell may refer to:

== Places ==
- Slidell, Louisiana
  - Slidell Airport
  - Slidell station
  - Slidell High School (Louisiana)
- Slidell, Texas
  - Slidell High School (Texas)
  - Slidell Independent School District

== People ==
- John Slidell
  - Slidell's proposal
