= List of first overall NBA draft picks =

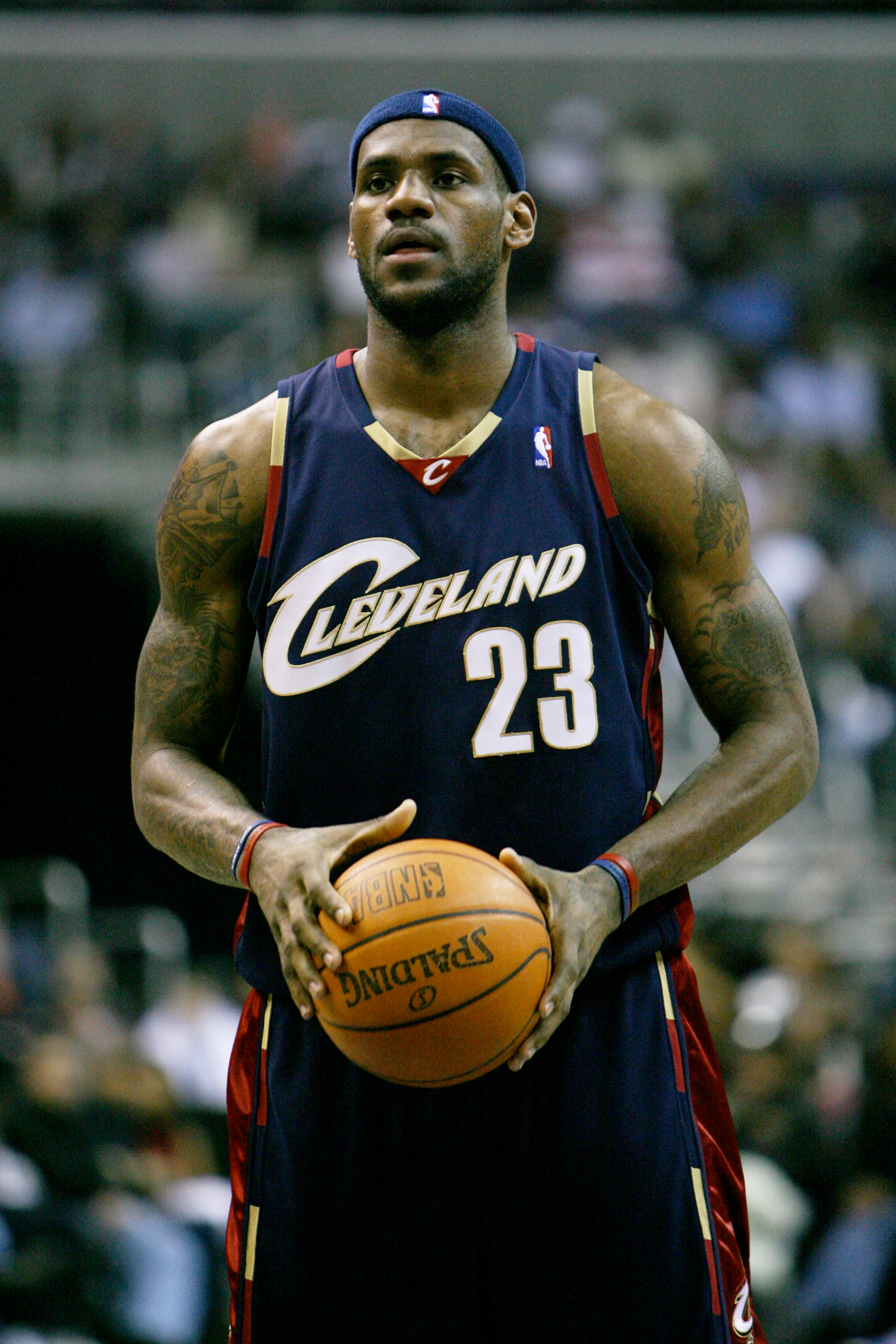
LeBron James, a high school draftee, was drafted first overall by the Cleveland Cavaliers at the 2003 NBA draft as one of the most anticipated prospects of all time.

The first overall pick in the National Basketball Association (NBA) is the player who is selected first among all eligible draftees by a team during the league's annual draft. The first pick is awarded to the team that wins the NBA draft lottery; in most cases, that team had a losing record in the previous season. The NBA team that garners the top overall draft pick selection generates significant media attention, as does the respective player who eventually gets selected with that first pick.

Eleven first picks have won the NBA Most Valuable Player Award: Oscar Robertson, Kareem Abdul-Jabbar (record six-time winner), Bill Walton, Magic Johnson (three-time winner), Hakeem Olajuwon, David Robinson, Shaquille O'Neal, Allen Iverson, Tim Duncan (two-time winner), LeBron James (four-time winner), and Derrick Rose (youngest winner).

China's Yao Ming (2002), Italy's Andrea Bargnani (2006), and France's Victor Wembanyama (2023) and Zaccharie Risacher (2024) are the only players without competitive experience in the United States to be drafted first overall. Eleven other international players with U.S. college experience have been drafted first overall – Mychal Thompson (Bahamas) in 1978, Olajuwon (Nigeria) in 1984, Patrick Ewing (Jamaica) in 1985, Duncan (U.S. Virgin Islands) in 1997, Michael Olowokandi (Nigeria) in 1998, Andrew Bogut (Australia) in 2005, Kyrie Irving (Australia) in 2011, Anthony Bennett (Canada) in 2013, Andrew Wiggins (Canada) in 2014, Ben Simmons (Australia) in 2016, and Deandre Ayton (Bahamas) in 2018. Duncan is an American citizen, but is considered an "international" player by the NBA because he was not born in one of the fifty states or the District of Columbia. Ewing had Jamaican-American dual citizenship when he was drafted, and Irving and Simmons had Australian-American dual citizenship when they were drafted.

The drafts between 1947 and 1949 were held by the Basketball Association of America (BAA). The Basketball Association of America became the National Basketball Association after absorbing teams from the National Basketball League in the fall of 1949. Official NBA publications include the BAA Drafts as part of the NBA's draft history.

== Key ==
^	Denotes players who have been selected to the All-Star Game or All-NBA Team
^*	Denotes Hall of Famers
PPG	Points per game (Note: All statistics are taken from the players' respective rookie season unless otherwise noted.)
APG	Assists per game
RPG	Rebounds per game
Player (in italic text)	Rookie of the Year
**Player** (in bold text)	Denotes a player who is currently active in the NBA

== List of first overall picks ==
Draft	Selected by	Player	Nationality	Position	College/ high school/ former club	NBA rookie statistics			Ref.
Draft	Selected by	Player	Nationality	Position	College/ high school/ former club	PPG	RPG	APG	Ref.
1947	Pittsburgh Ironmen	Clifton McNeely (Note: Clifton McNeely never played professional basketball. Instead, he became a basketball coach for Pampa High School in Texas.)	United States	Guard	Texas Wesleyan	—	—	—	
1948	Providence Steamrollers	Andy Tonkovich	United States	Guard/forward	Marshall	2.6	—	0.6	
1949	Providence Steamrollers	Howie Shannon (Note: Howie Shannon was the first overall pick, although Ed Macauley and Vern Mikkelsen had been taken before the draft as their teams' territorial picks.)	United States	Center	Kansas State	13.4	—	2.3	
1950	Boston Celtics	Charlie Share (Note: Charlie Share did not play in the 1950–51 season. His rookie statistics are from the 1951–52 season. Share was the first overall pick, although Paul Arizin had been taken before the draft as the Philadelphia Warriors' territorial pick.)	United States	Center	Bowling Green	3.9	5.3	1.0	
1951	Baltimore Bullets	Gene Melchiorre (Note: Gene Melchiorre never played in the NBA. He was banned for life from the NBA due to his involvement in the 1951 college basketball point-shaving scandal. Melchiorre was the first overall pick, although Myer Skoog had been taken before the draft as the Minneapolis Lakers' territorial pick.)	United States	Guard	Bradley	—	—	—	
1952	Milwaukee Hawks	Mark Workman (Note: Mark Workman was the first overall pick, although Bill Mlkvy had been taken before the draft as the Philadelphia Warriors' territorial pick.)	United States	Center	West Virginia	5.1	3.0	0.6	
1953	Baltimore Bullets	Ray Felix^ (Note: Ray Felix was the first overall pick, although Ernie Beck and Walter Dukes had been taken before the draft as their teams' territorial picks.)	United States	Center	Manchester British-Americans (ABL)	17.6	13.3	1.1	
1954	Baltimore Bullets	Frank Selvy^	United States	Forward/center	Furman	19.0	5.5	3.5	
1955	Milwaukee Hawks	Dick Ricketts (Note: Dick Ricketts was the first overall pick, although Dick Garmaker and Tom Gola had been taken before the draft as their teams' territorial picks.)	United States	Guard/forward	Duquesne	8.9	7.2	3.0	
1956	Rochester Royals	Sihugo Green (Note: Sihugo Green was the first overall pick, although Tom Heinsohn had been taken before the draft as the Boston Celtics' territorial pick.)	United States	Guard/forward	Duquesne	11.5	5.2	3.6	
1957	Cincinnati Royals	Rod Hundley^	United States	Guard	West Virginia	7.0	2.9	1.9	
1958	Minneapolis Lakers	Elgin Baylor^* (Note: Elgin Baylor was the first overall pick, although Guy Rodgers had been taken before the draft as the Philadelphia Warriors' territorial pick.)	United States	Forward	Seattle	24.9	15.0	4.1	
1959	Cincinnati Royals	Bob Boozer^ (Note: Bob Boozer was the first overall pick, although Wilt Chamberlain and Bob Ferry had been taken before the draft as their teams' territorial picks.)	United States	Forward	Kansas State	8.4	6.2	1.4	
1960	Cincinnati Royals	Oscar Robertson^* (Note: Although Oscar Robertson was drafted as a territorial pick by the Cincinnati Royals, he was also recognized as the first pick in the first round of the draft as the Royals also held the first overall draft pick.)	United States	Guard/forward	Cincinnati	30.5	10.1	9.7	
1961	Chicago Packers	Walt Bellamy^*	United States	Center	Indiana	31.6	19.0	2.7	
1962	Chicago Zephyrs	Bill McGill (Note: Bill McGill was the first overall pick, although Dave DeBusschere and Jerry Lucas had been taken before the draft as their teams' territorial picks.)	United States	Forward/center	Utah	7.4	2.7	0.6	
1963	New York Knicks	Art Heyman (Note: Art Heyman was the first overall pick, although Tom Thacker had been taken before the draft as the Cincinnati Royals' territorial pick.)	United States	Forward/guard	Duke	15.4	4.0	3.4	
1964	New York Knicks	Jim Barnes (Note: Jim Barnes was the first overall pick, although Walt Hazzard and George Wilson had been taken before the draft as their teams' territorial picks.)	United States	Center/forward	Texas Western	15.5	9.7	1.2	
1965	San Francisco Warriors	Fred Hetzel (Note: Fred Hetzel was the first overall pick, although Bill Bradley, Bill Buntin and Gail Goodrich had been taken before the draft as their teams' territorial picks.)	United States	Forward/center	Davidson	6.8	5.2	0.5	
1966	New York Knicks	Cazzie Russell^	United States	Forward/guard	Michigan	11.3	3.3	2.4	
1967	Detroit Pistons	Jimmy Walker^	United States	Guard	Providence	8.8	1.7	2.8	
1968	San Diego Rockets	Elvin Hayes^*	United States	Center/forward	Houston	28.4	17.1	1.4	
1969	Milwaukee Bucks	Lew Alcindor^* (Note: Before the 1971–72 season, Lew Alcindor changed his name to Kareem Abdul-Jabbar.)	United States	Center	UCLA	28.8	14.5	4.1	
1970	Detroit Pistons	Bob Lanier^*	United States	Center	St. Bonaventure	15.6	8.1	1.8	
1971	Cleveland Cavaliers	Austin Carr^	United States	Guard	Notre Dame	21.2	3.5	3.4	
1972	Portland Trail Blazers	LaRue Martin	United States	Center	Loyola (Illinois)	4.4	4.6	0.5	
1973	Philadelphia 76ers	Doug Collins^	United States	Guard/forward	Illinois State	8.0	1.8	1.6	
1974	Portland Trail Blazers	Bill Walton^*	United States	Center	UCLA	12.8	12.6	4.8	
1975	Atlanta Hawks	David Thompson^* (Note: David Thompson played in the American Basketball Association (ABA) in the 1975–76 season and did not play in the NBA until 1976. His rookie statistics are from the 1976–77 season.)	United States	Forward/guard	NC State	26.0	6.3	3.7	
1976	Houston Rockets	John Lucas	United States	Guard	Maryland	11.1	2.7	5.6	
1977	Milwaukee Bucks	Kent Benson	United States	Center	Indiana	7.7	4.3	1.4	
1978	Portland Trail Blazers	Mychal Thompson	Bahamas	Forward/center	Minnesota	14.7	8.3	2.4	
1979	Los Angeles Lakers	Magic Johnson^*	United States	Guard/forward	Michigan State	18.0	7.7	7.3	
1980	Golden State Warriors	Joe Barry Carroll^	United States	Center	Purdue	18.9	9.3	1.4	
1981	Dallas Mavericks	Mark Aguirre^	United States	Forward	DePaul	18.7	4.9	3.2	
1982	Los Angeles Lakers	James Worthy^*	United States	Forward	North Carolina	13.4	5.2	1.7	
1983	Houston Rockets	Ralph Sampson^*	United States	Center	Virginia	21.0	11.1	2.0	
1984	Houston Rockets	Hakeem Olajuwon^* (Note: Hakeem Olajuwon was born in Nigeria, but became a naturalized United States citizen in 1993. When he arrived to the United States, the University of Houston incorrectly spelled his first name "Akeem". Olajuwon used that spelling until March 9, 1991, when he announced that he would add an H, saying, "I'm not changing the spelling of my name, I'm correcting it.")	Nigeria	Center	Houston	20.6	11.9	1.4	
1985	New York Knicks	Patrick Ewing^*	United States (Note: Patrick Ewing was born in Jamaica, but had become a naturalized United States citizen while at Georgetown. He represented the United States at the 1984 Summer Olympics.)	Center	Georgetown	20.0	9.0	2.0	
1986	Cleveland Cavaliers	Brad Daugherty^	United States	Center	North Carolina	15.7	8.1	3.8	
1987	San Antonio Spurs	David Robinson^* (Note: David Robinson did not play in the NBA until 1989 due to commitments to the United States Navy. His rookie statistics are from the 1989–90 season.)	United States	Center	Navy	24.3	12.0	2.0	
1988	Los Angeles Clippers	Danny Manning^	United States	Forward	Kansas	16.7	6.6	3.1	
1989	Sacramento Kings	Pervis Ellison	United States	Center	Louisville	8.0	5.8	1.9	
1990	New Jersey Nets	Derrick Coleman^	United States	Forward/center	Syracuse	18.4	10.3	2.2	
1991	Charlotte Hornets	Larry Johnson^	United States	Forward	UNLV	19.2	11.0	3.6	
1992	Orlando Magic	Shaquille O'Neal^*	United States	Center	LSU	23.4	13.9	1.9	
1993	Orlando Magic	Chris Webber^*	United States	Forward	Michigan	17.5	9.1	3.6	
1994	Milwaukee Bucks	Glenn Robinson^	United States	Forward	Purdue	21.9	6.4	2.5	
1995	Golden State Warriors	Joe Smith	United States	Forward	Maryland	15.3	8.7	1.0	
1996	Philadelphia 76ers	Allen Iverson^*	United States	Guard	Georgetown	23.5	4.1	7.5	
1997	San Antonio Spurs	Tim Duncan^*	United States (Note: Tim Duncan is a United States citizen by birth, as are all natives of the U.S. Virgin Islands. Because of this citizenship arrangement, Duncan has played for the U.S. internationally.)	Forward/center	Wake Forest	21.1	11.9	2.7	
1998	Los Angeles Clippers	Michael Olowokandi	Nigeria	Center	Pacific	8.9	7.9	0.6	
1999	Chicago Bulls	Elton Brand^ (Note: Elton Brand shared Rookie of the Year honors with Steve Francis of the Houston Rockets.)	United States	Forward	Duke	20.1	10.0	1.9	
2000	New Jersey Nets	Kenyon Martin^	United States	Forward	Cincinnati	12.0	7.4	1.9	
2001	Washington Wizards	Kwame Brown	United States	Center	Glynn Academy HS (Brunswick, Georgia)	4.5	3.5	0.8	
2002	Houston Rockets	Yao Ming^*	China	Center	Shanghai Sharks (China)	13.5	8.2	1.7	
2003	Cleveland Cavaliers	**LeBron James**^	United States	Forward	St. Vincent–St. Mary HS (Akron, Ohio)	20.9	5.5	5.9	
2004	Orlando Magic	Dwight Howard^*	United States	Center	SACA (Atlanta)	12.0	10.0	0.9	
2005	Milwaukee Bucks	Andrew Bogut^	Australia	Center	Utah	9.4	7.0	2.3	
2006	Toronto Raptors	Andrea Bargnani	Italy	Forward/center	Benetton Treviso (Italy)	11.6	3.9	0.8	
2007	Portland Trail Blazers	Greg Oden (Note: Greg Oden underwent microfracture surgery on his right knee before the 2007–08 season, and missed the entire season. His rookie statistics are from the 2008–09 season.)	United States	Center	Ohio State	8.9	7.0	0.5	
2008	Chicago Bulls	Derrick Rose^	United States	Guard	Memphis	16.8	3.9	6.3	
2009	Los Angeles Clippers	Blake Griffin^ (Note: Blake Griffin injured his left kneecap in a pre-season game before the 2009–10 season. He underwent a surgery in January 2010 and missed the entire season. His rookie statistics are from the 2010–11 season.)	United States	Forward	Oklahoma	22.5	12.1	3.8	
2010	Washington Wizards	John Wall^	United States	Guard	Kentucky	16.4	4.6	8.3	
2011	Cleveland Cavaliers	**Kyrie Irving**^	United States (Note: Kyrie Irving was born in Australia to American parents who returned to the U.S. when he was two years old. He has played for the U.S. internationally at both youth and senior level.)	Guard	Duke	18.5	3.7	5.4	
2012	New Orleans Hornets	**Anthony Davis**^	United States	Forward/center	Kentucky	13.5	8.2	1.0	
2013	Cleveland Cavaliers	Anthony Bennett	Canada	Forward	UNLV	4.2	3.0	0.3	
2014	Cleveland Cavaliers	**Andrew Wiggins**^	Canada	Forward/guard	Kansas	16.9	4.6	2.1	
2015	Minnesota Timberwolves	**Karl-Anthony Towns**^	United States (Note: Karl-Anthony Towns was born and raised in the United States; his mother is Dominican. He has chosen to represent the Dominican Republic at the international level.)	Center	Kentucky	18.3	10.4	2.0	
2016	Philadelphia 76ers	Ben Simmons^ (Note: Ben Simmons injured his right foot during training camp before the 2016–17 season. He missed the entire season. His rookie statistics are from the 2017–18 season.)	Australia (Note: Simmons was born in Melbourne, Australia, to an American father and Australian mother. He chose to represent Australia at international level.)	Guard	LSU	15.8	8.1	8.2	
2017	Philadelphia 76ers	**Markelle Fultz**	United States	Guard	Washington	7.1	3.1	3.8	
2018	Phoenix Suns	**Deandre Ayton**	Bahamas	Center	Arizona	16.3	10.3	1.8	
2019	New Orleans Pelicans	**Zion Williamson**^	United States	Forward	Duke	22.5	6.3	2.1	
2020	Minnesota Timberwolves	**Anthony Edwards**^	United States	Guard	Georgia	19.3	4.7	2.9	
2021	Detroit Pistons	**Cade Cunningham**^	United States	Guard	Oklahoma State	17.4	5.5	5.6	
2022	Orlando Magic	**Paolo Banchero**^	United States	Forward	Duke	20.0	6.9	3.7	
2023	San Antonio Spurs	**Victor Wembanyama**^	France	Center	Metropolitans 92 (France)	21.4	10.6	3.9	
2024	Atlanta Hawks	**Zaccharie Risacher**	France	Forward	JL Bourg (France)	12.6	3.6	1.2	
2025	Dallas Mavericks	**Cooper Flagg**	United States	Forward	Duke	21.0	6.7	4.5	
2026	Washington Wizards	**AJ Dybantsa**	United States	Forward	BYU	—	—	—	

== First overall picks by NBA team ==
The Cleveland Cavaliers have held the first overall pick a total of six times, the most of any NBA team. The Baltimore Bullets, Pittsburgh Ironmen and the Providence Steamrollers are the only defunct franchises to have held a first overall pick. The Denver Nuggets, Indiana Pacers, Memphis Grizzlies, Miami Heat, Oklahoma City Thunder, and Utah Jazz are the only teams that have never had the first overall pick.

Team	Picks	Year(s)	Notes
Cleveland Cavaliers	6	1971, 1986, 2003, 2011, 2013, 2014	
Washington Wizards	5	1961, 1962, 2001, 2010, 2026	1 as the Chicago Packers; 1 as the Chicago Zephyrs; 3 as the Washington Wizards
Houston Rockets	5	1968, 1976, 1983, 1984, 2002	1 as the San Diego Rockets; 4 as the Houston Rockets
Sacramento Kings	5	1956, 1957, 1959, 1960, 1989	1 as the Rochester Royals; 3 as the Cincinnati Royals; 1 as the Sacramento Kings
Atlanta Hawks	4	1952, 1955, 1975, 2024	1 as the Milwaukee Hawks; 1 as the St. Louis Hawks; 2 as the Atlanta Hawks
Milwaukee Bucks	4	1969, 1977, 1994, 2005	
New York Knicks	4	1963, 1964, 1966, 1985	
Orlando Magic	4	1992, 1993, 2004, 2022	
Philadelphia 76ers	4	1973, 1996, 2016, 2017	
Portland Trail Blazers	4	1972, 1974, 1978, 2007	
Baltimore Bullets	3	1951, 1953, 1954	
Detroit Pistons	3	1967, 1970, 2021	
Golden State Warriors	3	1965, 1980, 1995	1 as the San Francisco Warriors; 2 as the Golden State Warriors
Los Angeles Clippers	3	1988, 1998, 2009	
Los Angeles Lakers	3	1958, 1979, 1982	1 as the Minneapolis Lakers; 2 as the Los Angeles Lakers
San Antonio Spurs	3	1987, 1997, 2023	
Brooklyn Nets	2	1990, 2000	Both as the New Jersey Nets
Chicago Bulls	2	1999, 2008	
Dallas Mavericks	2	1981, 2025	
Minnesota Timberwolves	2	2015, 2020	
New Orleans Pelicans	2	2012, 2019	
Providence Steamrollers	2	1948, 1949	
Boston Celtics	1	1950	
Charlotte Hornets	1	1991	
Pittsburgh Ironmen	1	1947	
Phoenix Suns	1	2018	
Toronto Raptors	1	2006	

== First overall picks by position ==
Position	Number of selections	Last year selected
Forward	38	2026
Center	37	2023
Guard	24	2021

== See also ==
- List of undrafted NBA players
- List of first overall NBA G League draft picks
- List of first overall WNBA draft picks
- List of first overall Major League Baseball draft picks
- List of first overall NFL draft picks
- List of first overall NHL draft picks
