= Slidell High School =

Slidell High School may refer to:

- Slidell High School (Louisiana)
- Slidell High School (Texas)
