= Cisco High School (Texas) =

Coordinates: 32.3776°N 98.9931°W

Location
- 1300 Pershing; Cisco, Texas 76437-1645; United States

Information
- School type: high school
- School district: Cisco Independent School District
- Principal: Craig Kent
- Staff: 25.16 (FTE)
- Grades: 9-12
- Enrollment: 234 (2023–2024)
- Student to teacher ratio: 9.30
- Colors: Black & Gold
- Athletics conference: UIL Class AA (2A)
- Mascot: Lobo
- Website: Cisco High School website

Cisco High School is a public high school located in Cisco, Texas, United States, and classified as a 2A school by the University Interscholastic League (UIL). It is part of the Cisco Independent School District located in western Eastland County. In 2013, the school was rated "met standard" by the Texas Education Agency.

== History ==
Rupert Richardson, who became a prominent Texas historian and president of Hardin–Simmons University, was principal of the school in 1915-16.

In 1963, part of the existing high school had been closed off due to structural failure, leaving the then-309 students using the west and center sections of the school built in 1923. A new building was built and opened in 1964, which cost $600,000 to build, and the old school was demolished.

In 2006, the new music facility at the high school was named the J.J. Haynie Band Hall in honor of trumpeter John Haynie, who played with the high school band when he was in elementary school, and went on to become a music professor at the University of North Texas.

== Athletics ==
The Cisco Loboes compete in these sports

Cross-country running, football, basketball, golf, tennis, track and field, softball, and baseball

=== State titles ===
- Football
  - 2013(2A/D2) (defeated Refugio High School)
- Boys' golf
  - 2001(2A)
- Girls' track
  - 2001(2A), 2002(2A)

== Notable alumni ==
- Dash Crofts (1956) of the easy-listening band Seals & Crofts
