= Cisco Independent School District =

School district in Texas

Cisco Independent School District is a public school district based in Cisco, Texas, United States. Located in Eastland County, a very small portion of the district extends into Callahan County.

Cisco Junior College was originally part of the district until 1956, when it became a stand-alone entity.

Rupert N. Richardson, a Texas historian who was later the president of Hardin-Simmons University in Abilene, was principal at Cisco High School from 1915 to 1916.

In 2009, the school district was rated "recognized" by the Texas Education Agency.

== Schools ==
- Cisco High School (grades 9–12)
- Cisco Junior High (grades 6–8)
- Cisco Elementary (prekindergarten-grade 5)
