= Lake Cisco =

Lake in central Texas

- Location within Texas Location within the United States
- Location: Eastland County, Texas
- Coordinates: 32°26′26.9″N 99°00′10.0″W
- Type: Lake
- Part of: Brazos River Basin
- River sources: Sandy Creek
- Managing agency: City of Cisco
- First flooded: 1923
- Surface area: 1,050 acres (420 ha)
- Max. depth: 70 feet (21 m)
- Surface elevation: 1,509 feet (460 m)
- Settlements: Cisco, Texas

Lake Cisco is a lake located north of Cisco in Eastland County, Texas. Texas State Highway 6 passes the lake on the eastern shore.

It is owned by the city of Cisco for municipal water purposes. Fish species found in Lake Cisco include largemouth bass, channel catfish, white crappie, and redear sunfish.

== History ==
Cisco obtained a permit in June 1920 to build a dam. The dam was completed September 1923, and then the lake was impounded in 1923. The lake was reduced in size due to damage to the Missouri–Kansas–Texas Railroad, in which the city was injuncted over. Later, Cisco obtained a new permit in January 1955 to dam Battle Creek to compensate for Lake Cisco's reduced size.
