= Mobley Hotel =

- U.S. National Register of Historic Places
- Recorded Texas Historic Landmark
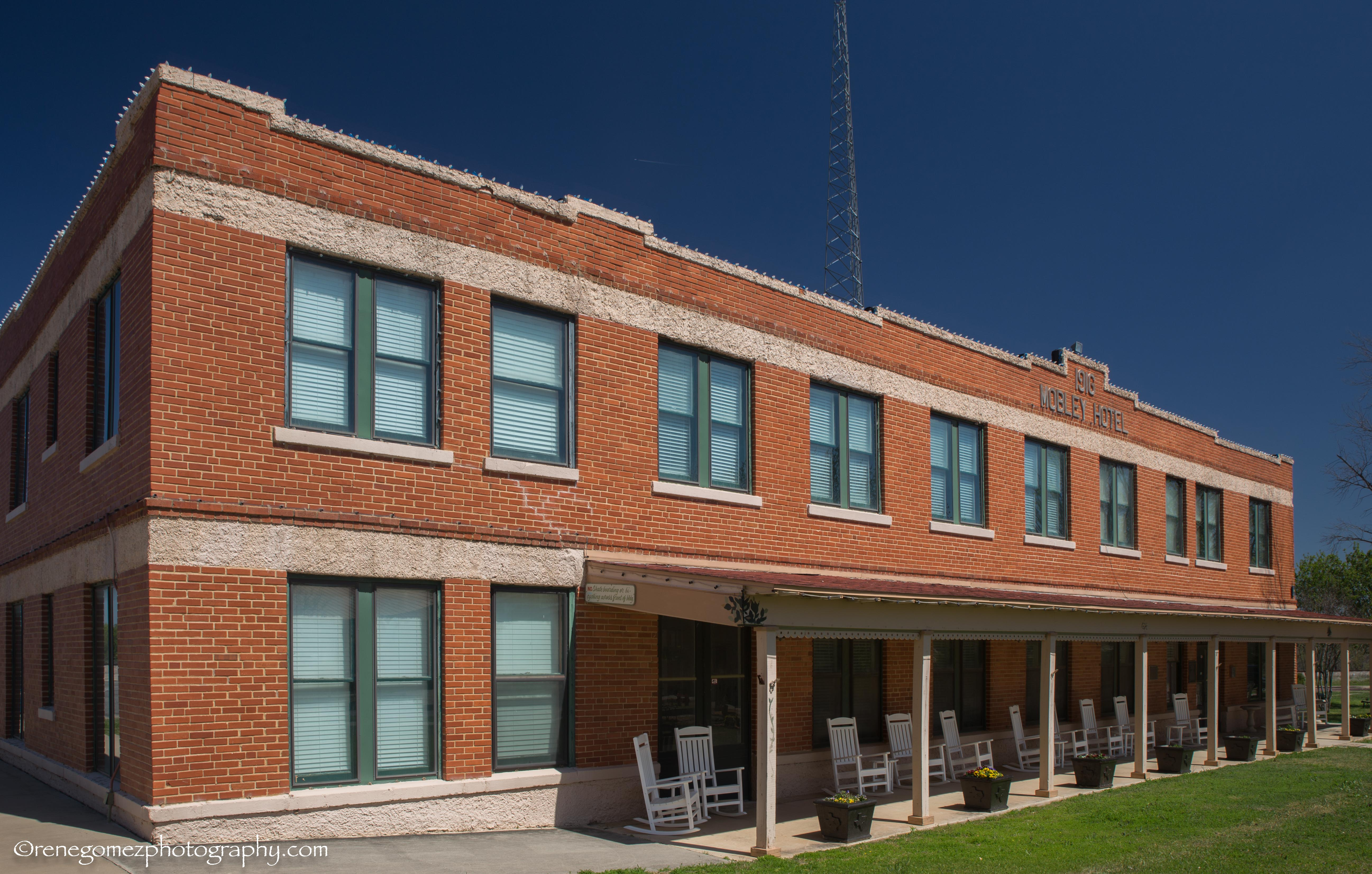
- The Mobley Hotel in 2019
- Location: Cisco, Texas
- Built: 1916
- NRHP reference No.: 81000628

Significant dates
- Added to NRHP: 13 May 1981
- Designated RTHL: 1970

The Mobley Hotel is a historic hotel located in Cisco, Texas. It was the first hotel owned by Conrad Hilton, the founder of Hilton Hotels. It is a two-story brick building.

== History ==
In 1916, Henry Mobley opened the hotel. Most of its guests came from the nearby railway station. Mobley capitalized on the local oil boom by renting out rooms for 8-hour periods coinciding with the oil fields' shift. The builder was a local contractor from Sweden named Albin Julius Olson.

A recreation of a typical Mobley Hotel room in the 1920s

In 1919, Conrad Hilton purchased the hotel for $40,000, marking his first hotel acquisition. Hilton emphasized a philosophy of minimum cost and maximum comfort, which he referred to as "minimax." Hilton sold the hotel in 1929. Unfortunately, during the Depression, the hotel fell into disrepair. In 1956, it was repurposed as a senior citizens' home. Later, in 1977, the hotel was transformed into a memorial museum for Hilton.
