= Pampa News =

Newspaper in Pampa, Texas

The Pampa News
- Type: Triweekly
- Format: Broadsheet
- Publisher: ReDonn Woods
- Editor: Caleb Dorn
- Founded: 1906
- Headquarters: P.O. Box 2198 Pampa, Texas 79066; United States
- Circulation: 1,934 (as of 2023)
- Website: The Pampa News

The Pampa News is a weekly newspaper serving Pampa, Texas. Established in 1906, it is published three times a week, excluding major holidays. As of 2012, its daily circulation was approximately 3,600 copies.

== See also ==
- Pampa, Texas
- List of newspapers in Texas
