= Cisco, Texas =

- City
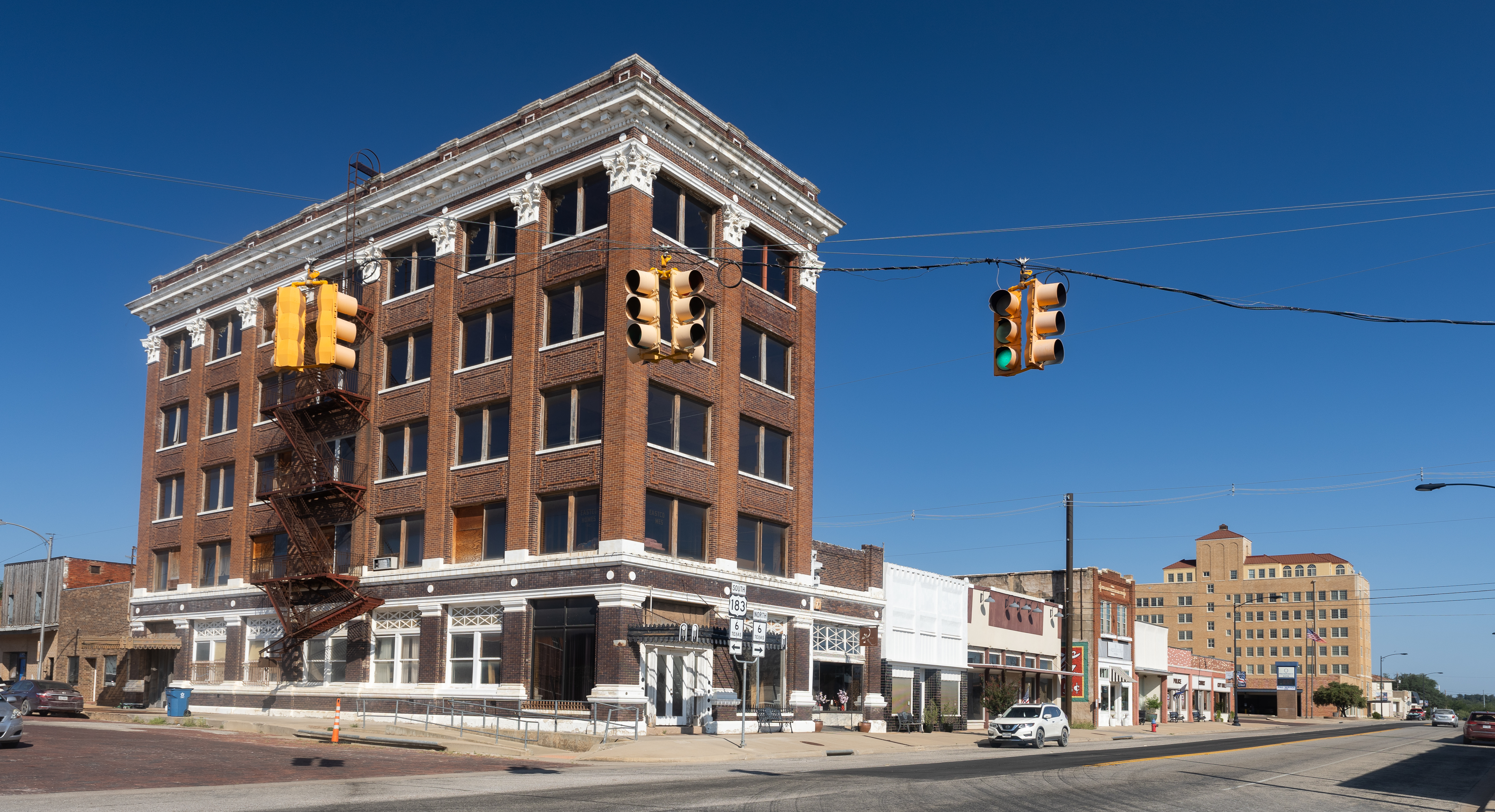
- Downtown Cisco (2024)
- Motto: City of Progress
- Interactive map of Cisco
- Location in Texas Location in the United States
- Coordinates: 32°22′44″N 98°58′55″W
- Country: United States
- State: Texas
- County: Eastland
- Incorporated (city): 1921

Government
  - Type: Council-Manager
  - Mayor: Stephen Forester
  - City Manager: Sarah Adams

Area
  - Total: 4.96 sq mi (12.84 km^{2})
  - Land: 4.95 sq mi (12.83 km^{2})
  - Water: 0.0039 sq mi (0.01 km^{2})
- Elevation: 1,644 ft (501 m)

Population (2020)
  - Total: 3,883
  - Estimate (2024): 4,029
  - Density: 783.9/sq mi (302.7/km^{2})
- Time zone: UTC-6 (Central (CST))
  - Summer (DST): UTC-5 (CDT)
- ZIP code: 76437
- Area code: 254
- FIPS code: 48-15004
- GNIS feature ID: 2409463
- Website: www.ciscotexas.gov

Cisco is a city in Eastland County, Texas, United States. Its population was 3,883 at the 2020 census and 3,899 at the 2010 census.

== History ==
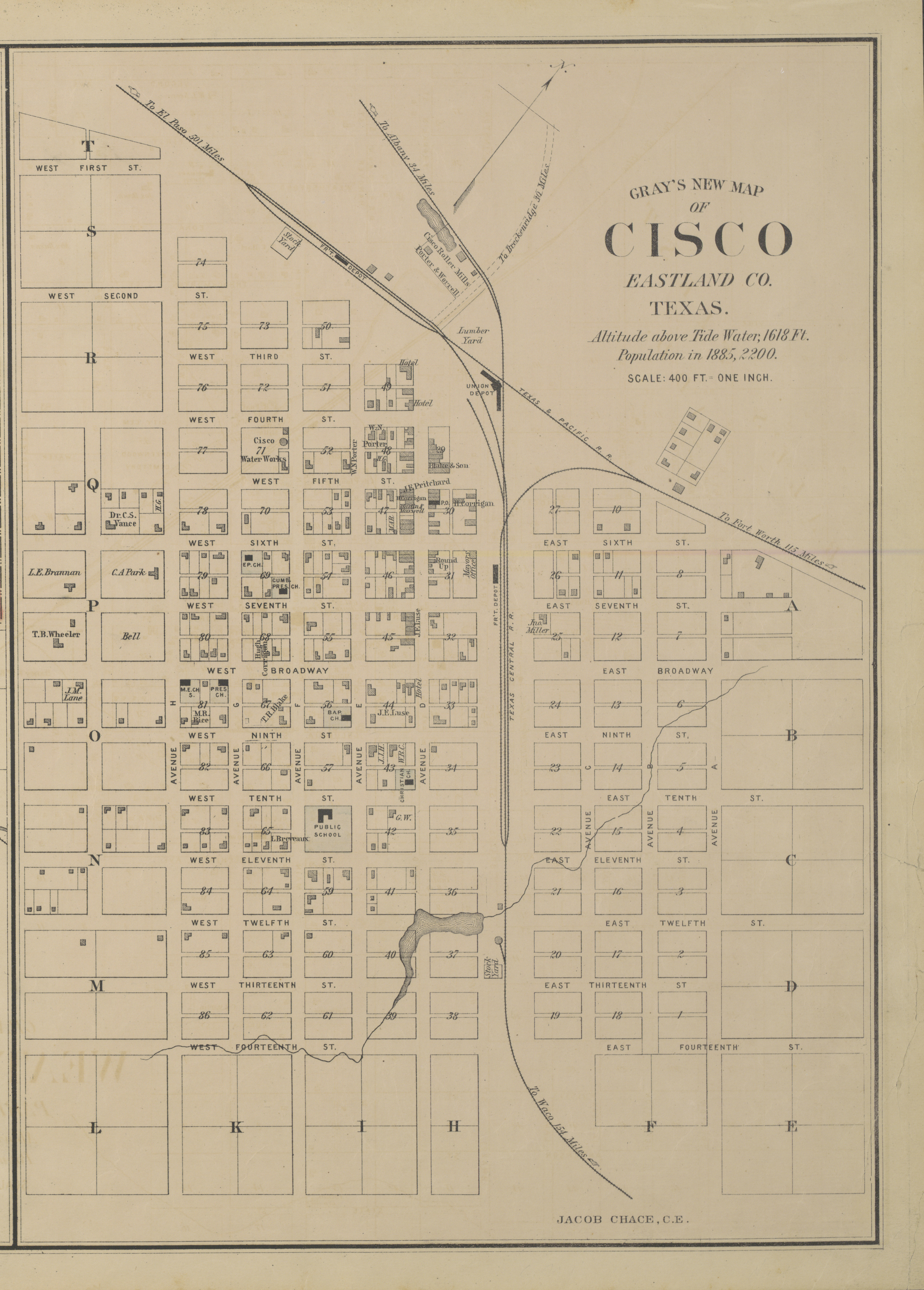
Gray's New Map of Cisco, Eastland Co., Texas, 1885

Cisco, at the intersection of U.S. Highway 183 and Interstate 20 in northwestern Eastland County, traces its history back to 1878 or 1879, when Rev. C. G. Stevens arrived in the area, established a post office and a church, and called the frontier settlement "Red Gap". About six families were already living nearby, and W. T. Caldwell was running a store a half mile to the west. In 1881, the Houston and Texas Central Railway crossed the Texas and Pacific, which had come through the year before, at a point near Red Gap, and the settlement's inhabitants moved their town to the crossing. The date the rails crossed, May 17, 1881, is considered by some to be Cisco's "birthday". Three years later, the town was officially recognized and a new post office granted; the town's name was changed to "Cisco" for John J. Cisco, a New York financier largely responsible for the building of the Houston and Texas Central.

Railroads continued to influence the development of Cisco as the Texas and Pacific acquired lots in the town and sold them to immigrants attracted by brochures touting the town as the "Gate City of the West". Once settlers arrived, agricultural agents employed by the railroad advised them what and when to plant and on occasion provided the seed.

During the 1880s, a Mrs. Haws built and managed the first hotel, and Mrs. J. D. Alexander brought the first "millinery and fancy goods" to town. Following a practice common at the time, religious groups in Cisco met together for prayer meetings in the schoolhouse until they could build separate churches. By 1892, Cisco was a growing community with two newspapers, a bank, and an economy based on trade, ranching, fruit farming, and the limestone, coal, and iron ore available nearby. A broom factory and roller corn and flour mills were among the town's 56 businesses.

On April 28, 1893, an F4 tornado struck the center of the business district of Cisco, killing 28 people and destroying or severely damaging every building in town. The city hall, every church and school, and an estimated 500 homes were destroyed.

Conrad Hilton started the Hilton Hotel chain with a single hotel bought in Cisco. Hilton came to Cisco to buy a bank, but the bank cost too much, so he purchased the Mobley Hotel in 1919. The hotel is now a local museum and community center.

During the 1920s, Cisco, like nearby Ranger, Eastland, and Desdemona, was a petroleum boomtown. Although Cisco played a relatively minor role in the Eastland County oil boom of 1919–21, its population grew rapidly at the time, with some estimates as high as 15,000; in the wake of the boom, Cisco adopted a city charter and built a new railroad station that cost $25,000, a value of $310,597.88 in 2015.

In 1925, the first annual meeting of the West Texas Historical Association was held in Cisco. The association, formed in 1924, was then based at Hardin–Simmons University in Abilene, but moved in 1998 to Texas Tech University in Lubbock.

The Santa Claus Bank Robbery occurred in Cisco on December 23, 1927, when Marshall Ratliff and his gang attempted to rob the First National Bank. As of August 2009, the bank site is occupied by an auto parts store, with a Texas Historical Commission sign commemorating the event.

On May 9, 2015, an area just south of the city was hit by a large tornado, destroying several homes, killing one person, and critically injuring one more.

=== Largest concrete swimming pool in the world ===
Cisco in its early days was plagued with inadequate water supply. In the 1920s, the Williamson Dam was built north of town, resulting in the formation of Lake Cisco. The dam was named after James Milton Williamson, long-time mayor and survivor of the 1893 tornado. The dam's base was billed as the largest concrete swimming pool in the world. The complex boasted a two-story building with a skating rink upstairs, a zoo, an amusement park with rides, and a park. Bob Wills was only one of the celebrities to entertain there. For decades, it was a major attraction for folks from miles around. The hollow dam was at one time open to the public, but this is no longer the case. The pool closed in the 1970s and the vacant skating rink burned a few years later.

== Geography ==
Cisco is located in northwestern Eastland County. Interstate 20 passes through the south side of the city, leading west 45 miles (72 km) to Abilene and east 105 miles (169 km) to Fort Worth. Access to Cisco is from Exits 330 and 332. U.S. Route 183 passes through the center of Cisco, leading north 28 miles (45 km) to Breckenridge and south 49 miles (79 km) to Brownwood. Texas State Highway 6 also passes through the center of town, leading east 10 miles (16 km) to Eastland, the county seat, and northwest 33 miles (53 km) to Albany. Texas State Highway 206 leaves Cisco to the southwest, leading 22 miles (35 km) to Cross Plains.

According to the United States Census Bureau, the city has a total area of 4.9 square miles (12.8 km^{2}), of which 2.216 acres (8,966 m^{2}), or 0.07%, is covered by water.

== Demographics ==
Historical population
Census	Pop.	Note	%±
1890	1,063		—
1900	1,514		42.4%
1910	2,410		59.2%
1920	7,422		208.0%
1930	6,027		−18.8%
1940	4,868		−19.2%
1950	5,230		7.4%
1960	4,499		−14.0%
1970	4,160		−7.5%
1980	4,517		8.6%
1990	3,813		−15.6%
2000	3,851		1.0%
2010	3,899		1.2%
2020	3,883		−0.4%
U.S. Decennial Census

=== 2020 census ===
As of the 2020 census, Cisco had a population of 3,883 with 1,464 households and 905 families residing in the city. The median age was 36.0 years; 23.3% of the residents were under 18 and 18.2% were 65 or older. The female/male ratio was 1:0.901 overall and 1:0.867 for those 18 and over.

None of the residents lived in urban areas, while 100.0% lived in rural areas.

Of the 1,464 households in Cisco, 32.4% had children under 18 living in them, 45.1% were married-couple households, 17.6% were households with a male householder and no spouse or partner present, and 32.2% were households with a female householder and no spouse or partner present. About 31.2% of all households were made up of individuals, and 16.0% had someone living alone who was 65 or older.

The city had 1,803 housing units, of which 18.8% were vacant. Among occupied housing units, 64.9% were owner-occupied and 35.1% were renter-occupied. The homeowner vacancy rate was 3.0% and the rental vacancy rate was 12.2%.

Racial composition as of the 2020 census
Race	Percentage
White	81.5%
Black or African American	3.6%
American Indian and Alaska Native	1.2%
Asian	0.6%
Native Hawaiian and other Pacific Islander	0.1%
Some other race	6.0%
Two or more races	7.1%
Hispanic or Latino (of any race)	15.0%

=== 2000 census ===
As of the census of 2000, 3,851 people, 1,491 households, and 970 families resided in the city. The population density was 794.1 inhabitants per square mile (306.6/km^{2}). The 1,849 housing units averaged 381.3 per square mile (147.2/km^{2}). The racial makeup of the city was 90.00% White, 3.87% African American, 0.68% Native American, 0.16% Asian, 0.05% Pacific Islander, 4.02% from other races, and 1.22% from two or more races. Hispanics or Latinos of any race were 10.00% of the population.

Of the 1,491 households, 27.4% had children under 18 living with them, 48.3% were married couples living together, 12.3% had a female householder with no husband present, and 34.9% were not families; 31.8% of all households were made up of individuals, and 18.5% had someone living alone who was 65 or older. The average household size was 2.41, and the average family size was 3.03.

In the city, the age distribution was 24.0% under 18, 13.4% from 18 to 24, 21.7% from 25 to 44, 21.4% from 45 to 64, and 19.5% who were 65 or older. The median age was 38 years. For every 100 females, there were 87.9 males. For every 100 females 18 and over, there were 85.4 males.

The median income in the city for a household was $24,069 and for a family was $31,833. Males had a median income of $27,222 versus $16,250 for females. The per capita income for the city was $13,504. About 13.0% of families and 21.8% of the population were below the poverty line, including 30.3% of those under 18 and 20.0% of those 65 or over.

== Education ==
Cisco is served by the Cisco Independent School District. The Cisco High School football team won the 2A Div II championship game against Refugio High School (Bobcats) at Dallas Cowboys AT&T Stadium in Arlington on December 19, 2013. The championship was Cisco's first. The mascot for Cisco High School is the Loboes, proudly misspelled for decades, and their colors are black and gold.

Cisco College, an affordable, two-year college, was established in Cisco in 1940. It is one of two community colleges in Eastland County. The college mascot is the Wranglers, and its school colors are blue and white.

== Notable people ==
- Darrell "Dash" Crofts (1938-2026) of the music duo Seals and Crofts
- Jean Porter (1922–2018), actress
- Leslie Turner (1899–1988), American animator and father of the Gerber Baby
- Dan and Farris Wilks, businessmen in the petroleum industry
- Stan Williams, NFL player

== Gallery ==
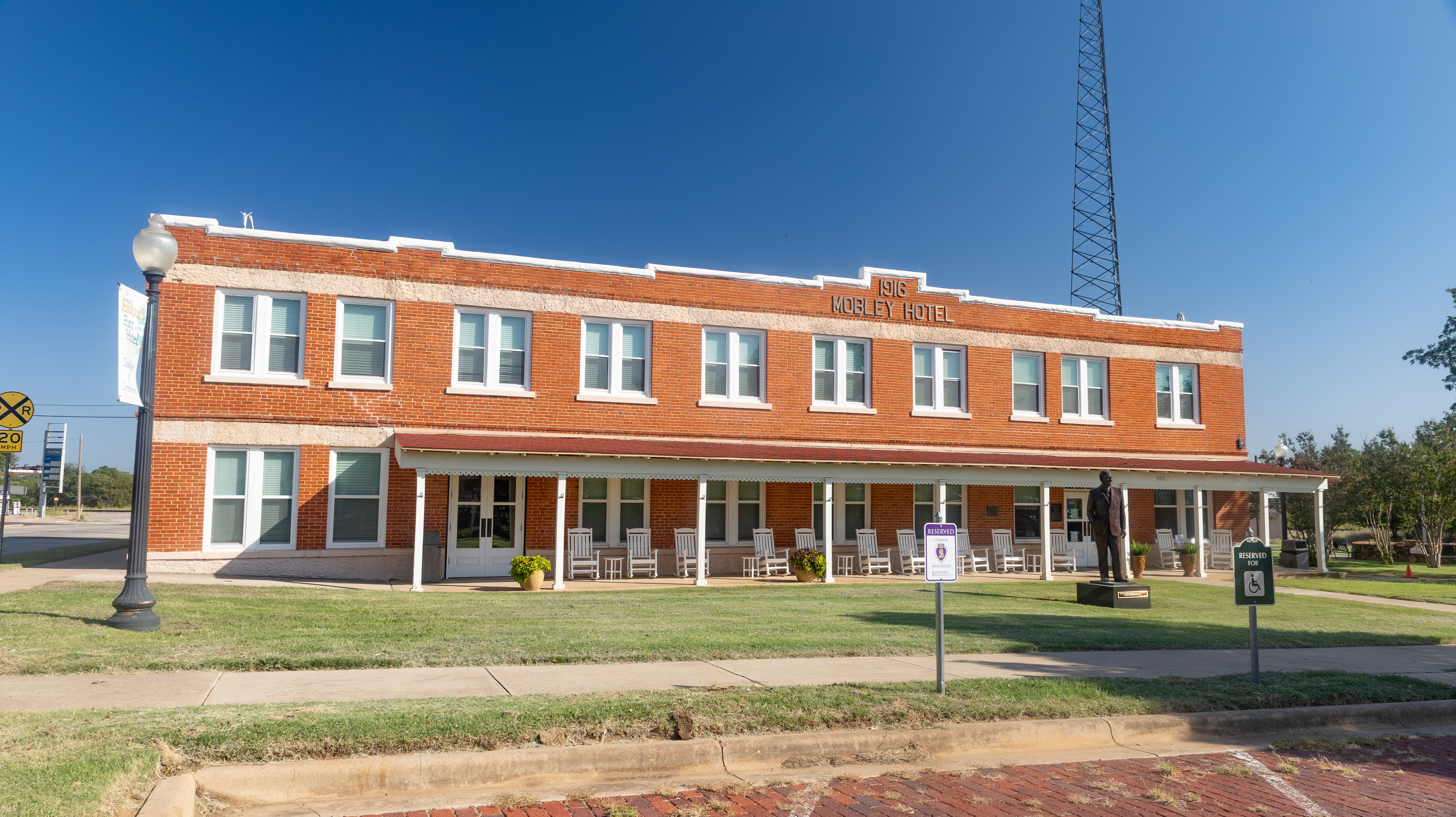
Conrad Hilton's Mobley Hotel

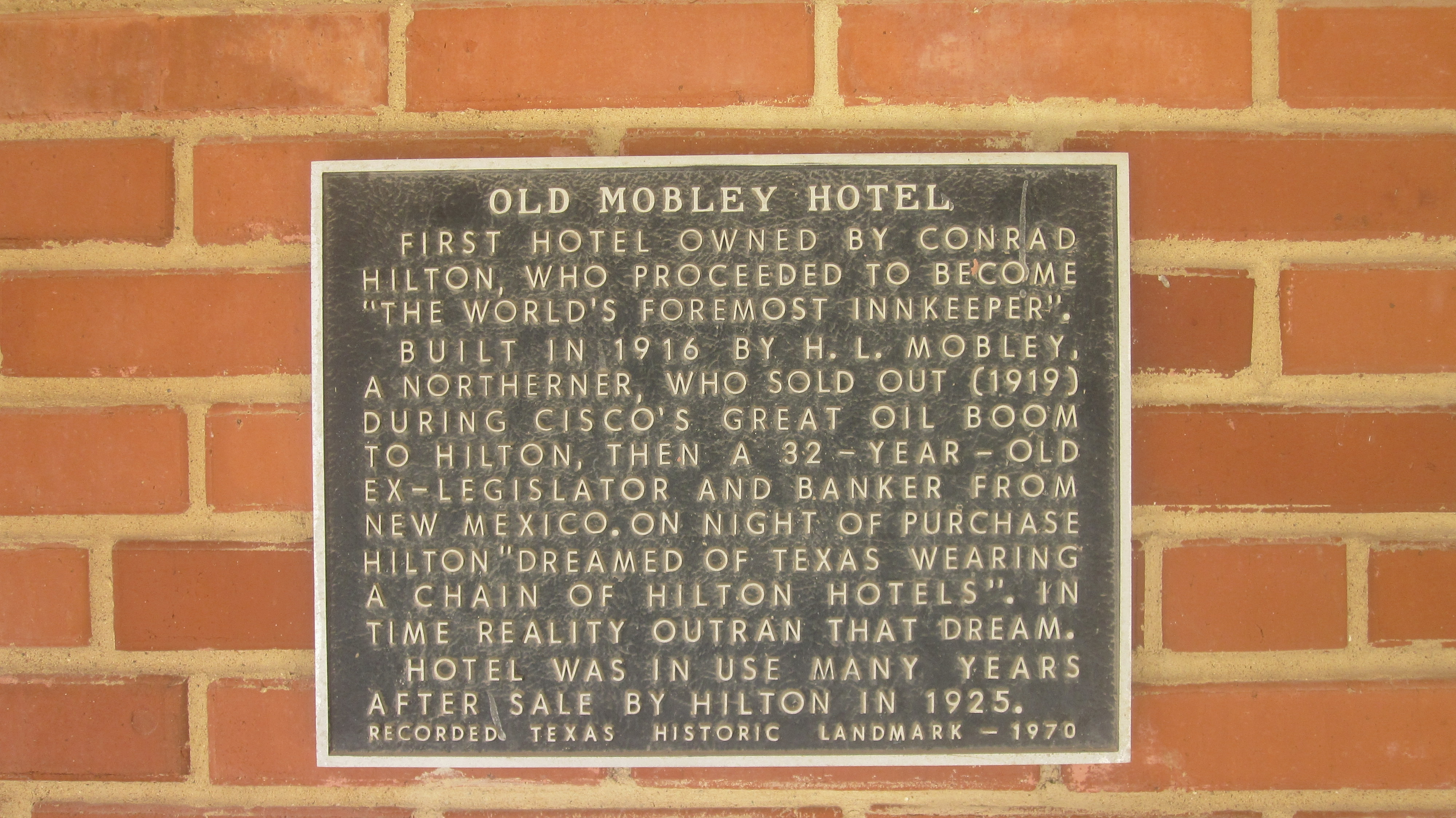
Mobley Hotel historical marker

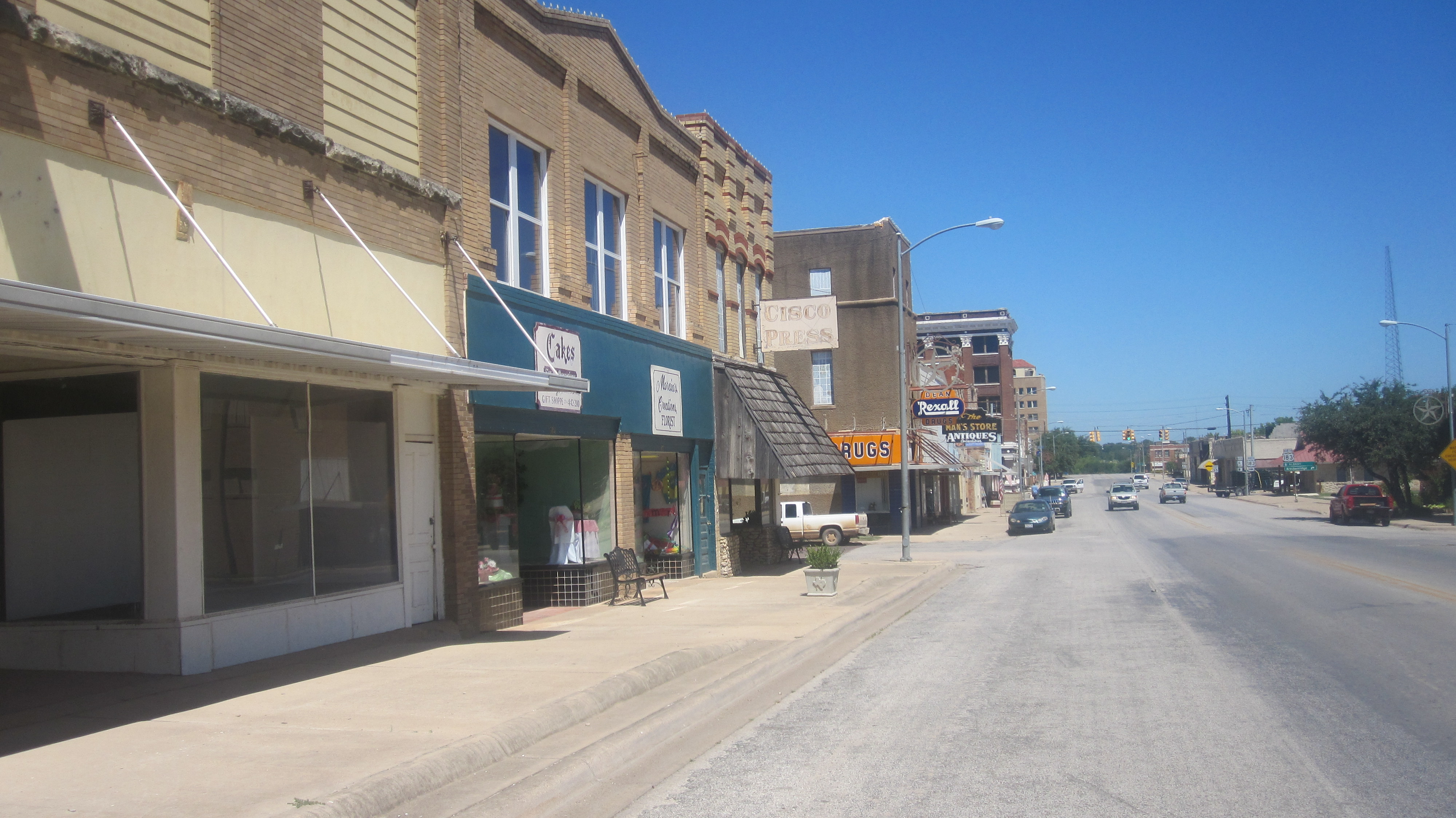
Downtown Cisco

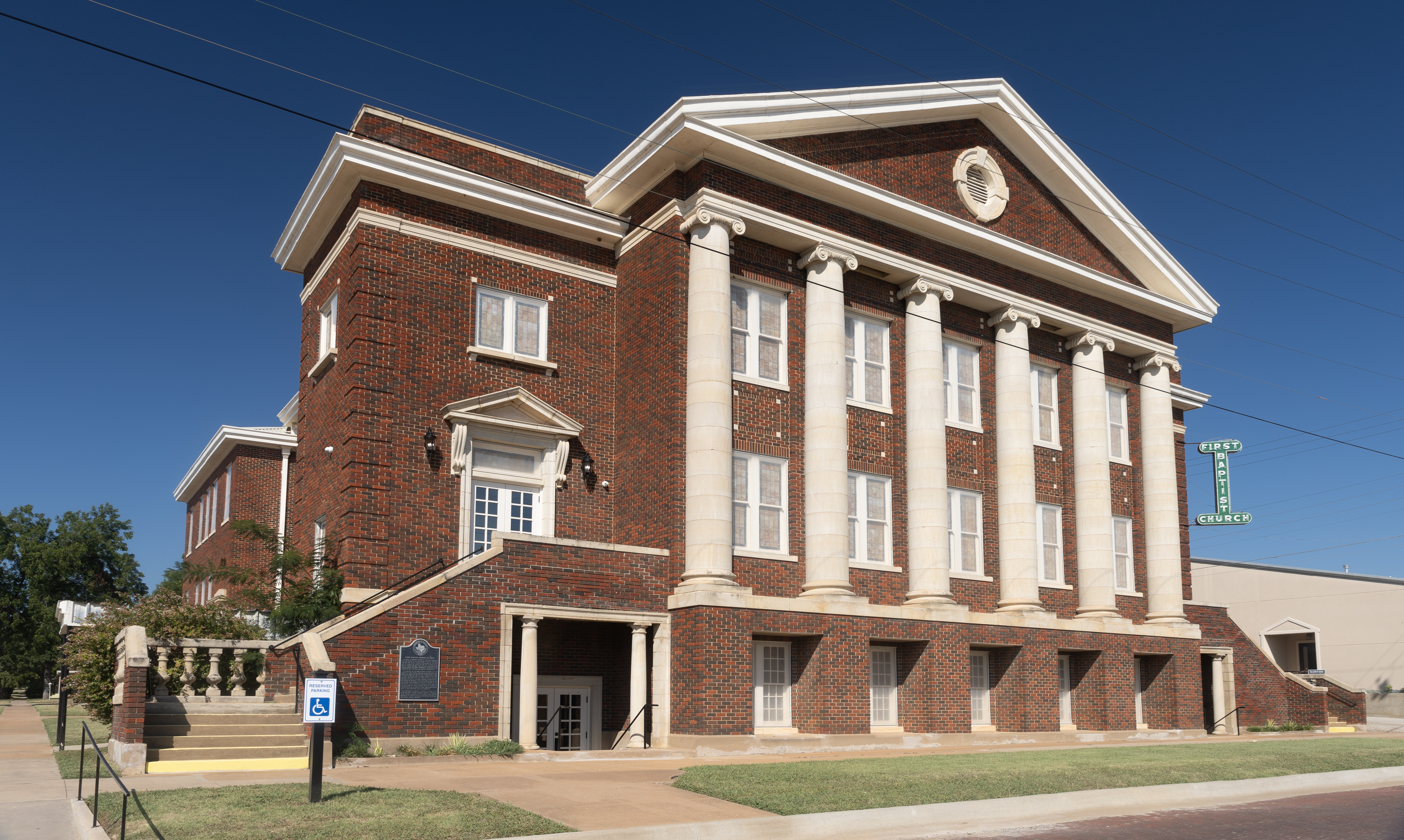
First Baptist Church

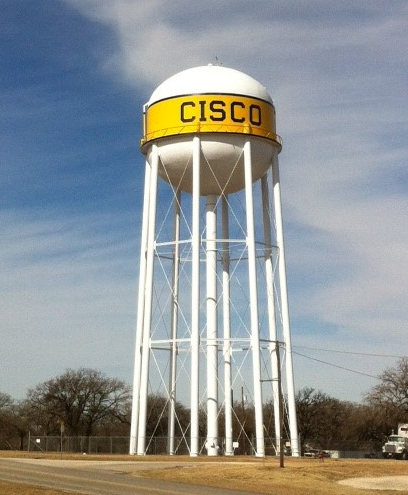
Municipal water tower

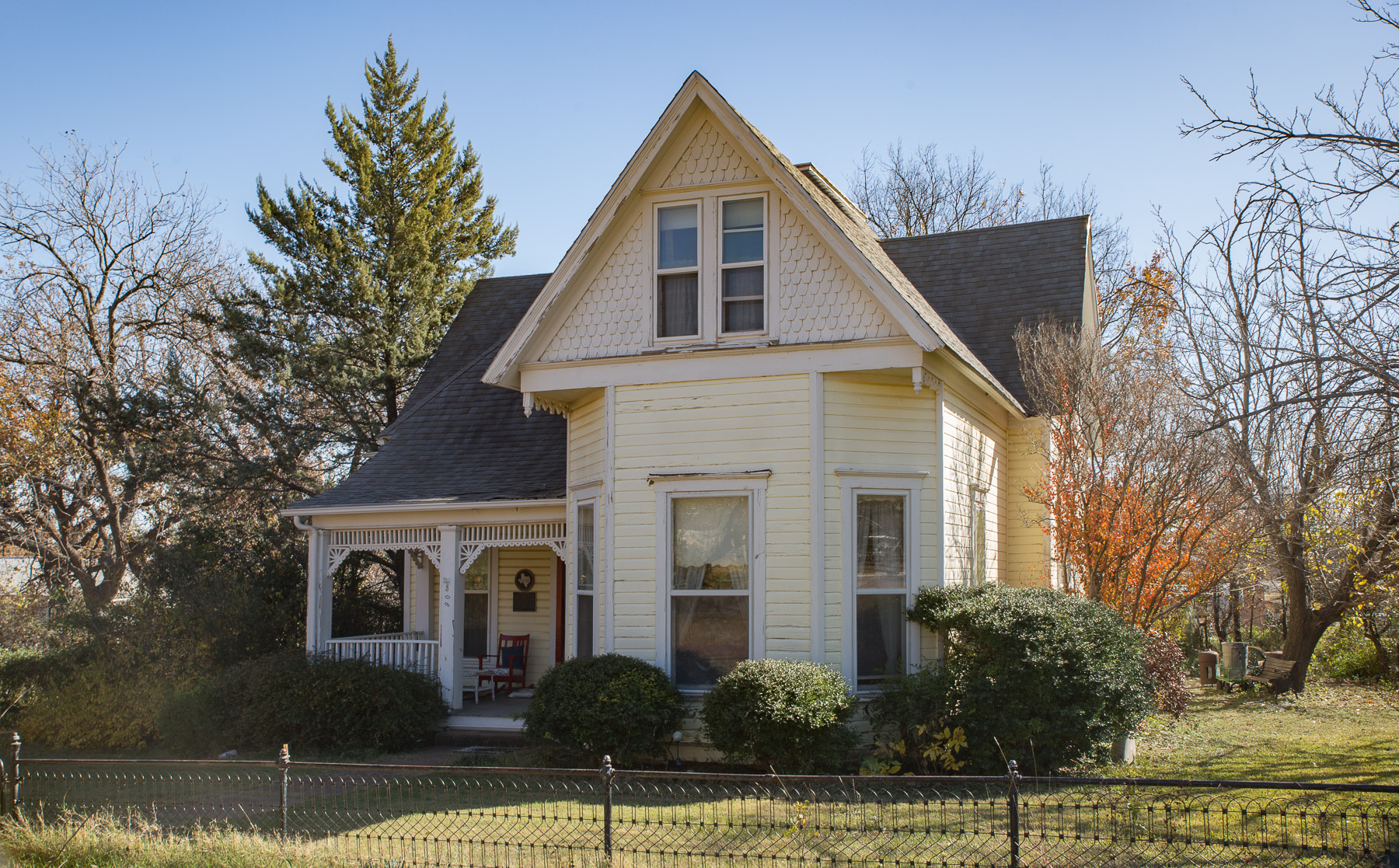
Kean House

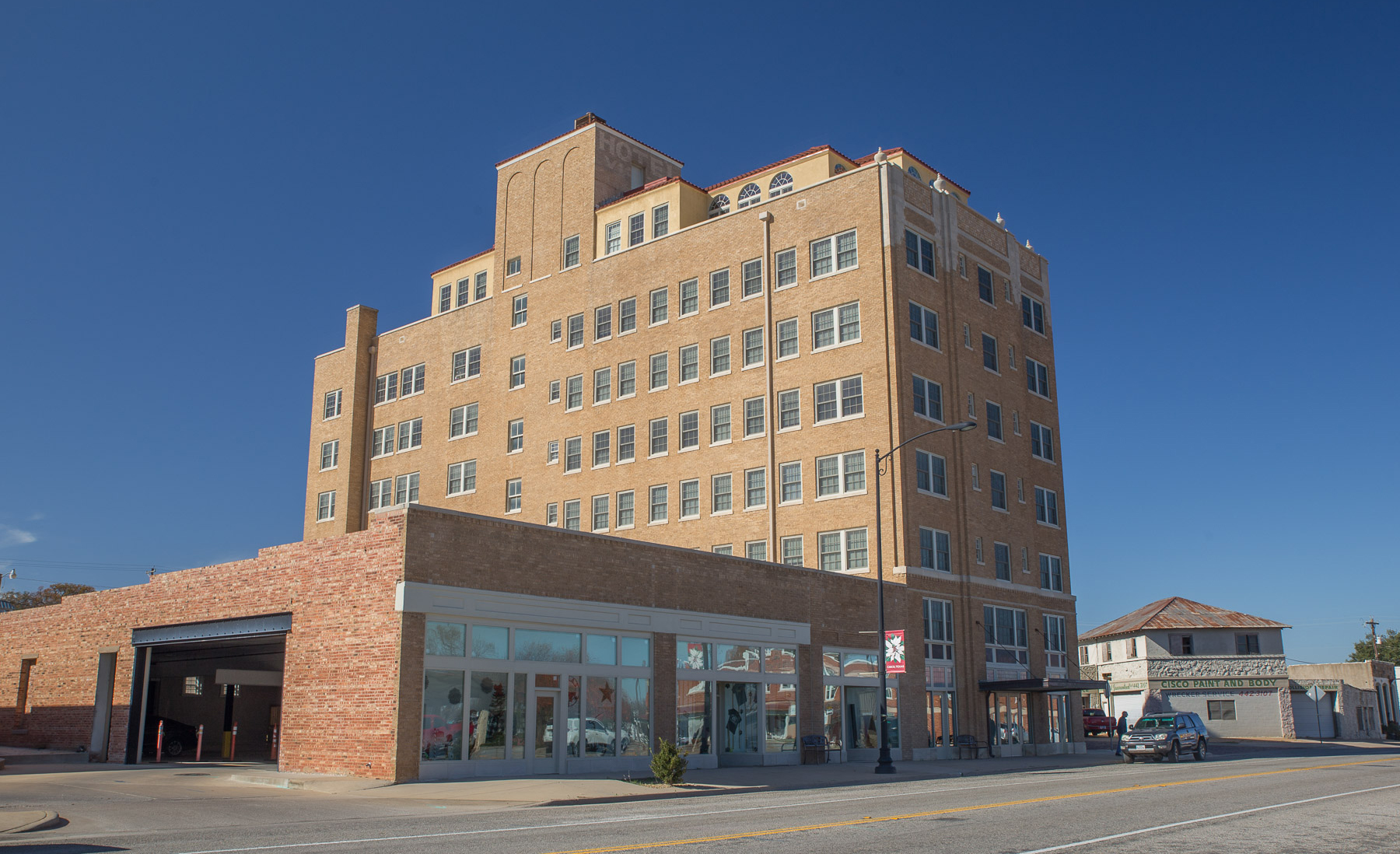
Laguna Hotel

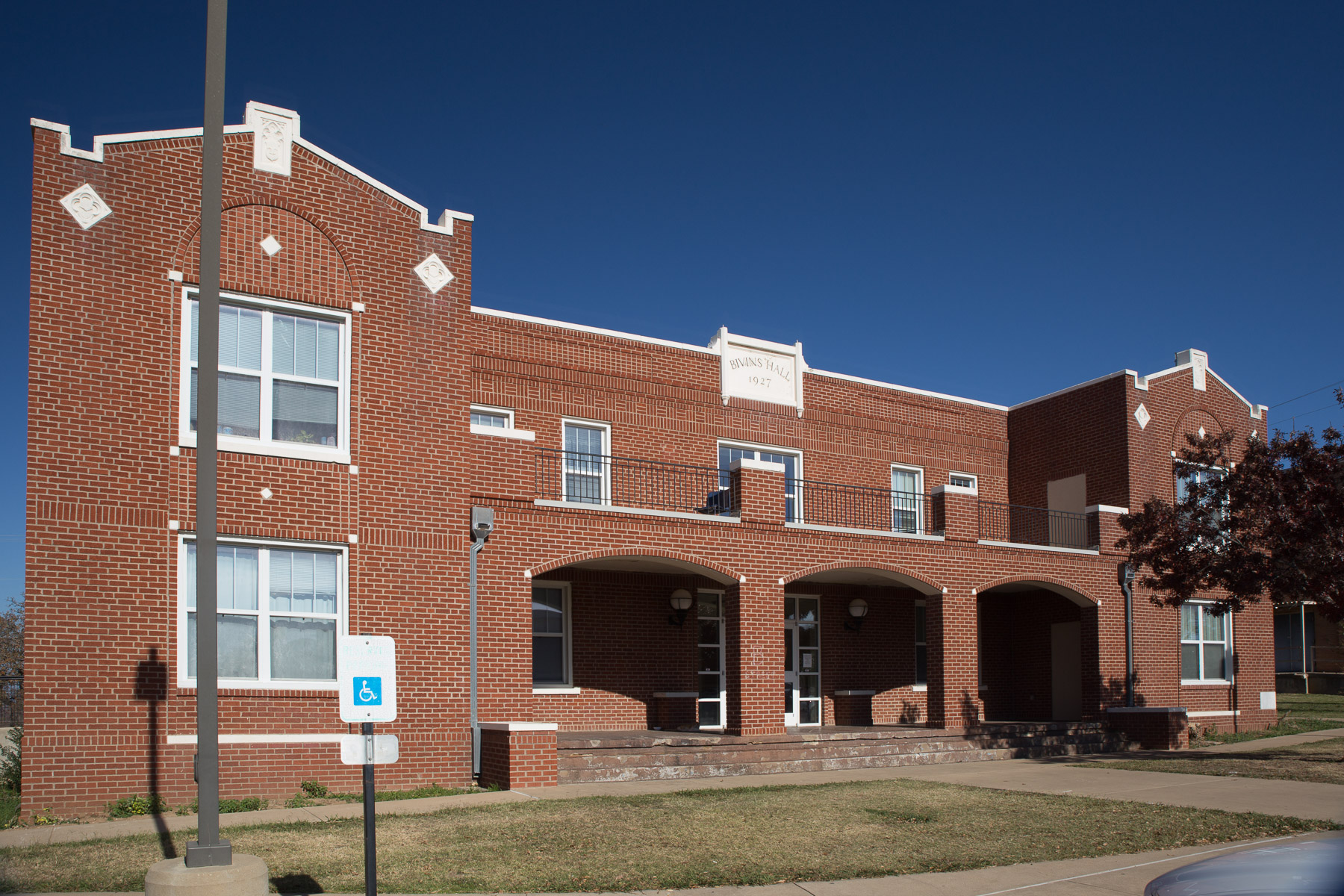
Blivins Hall

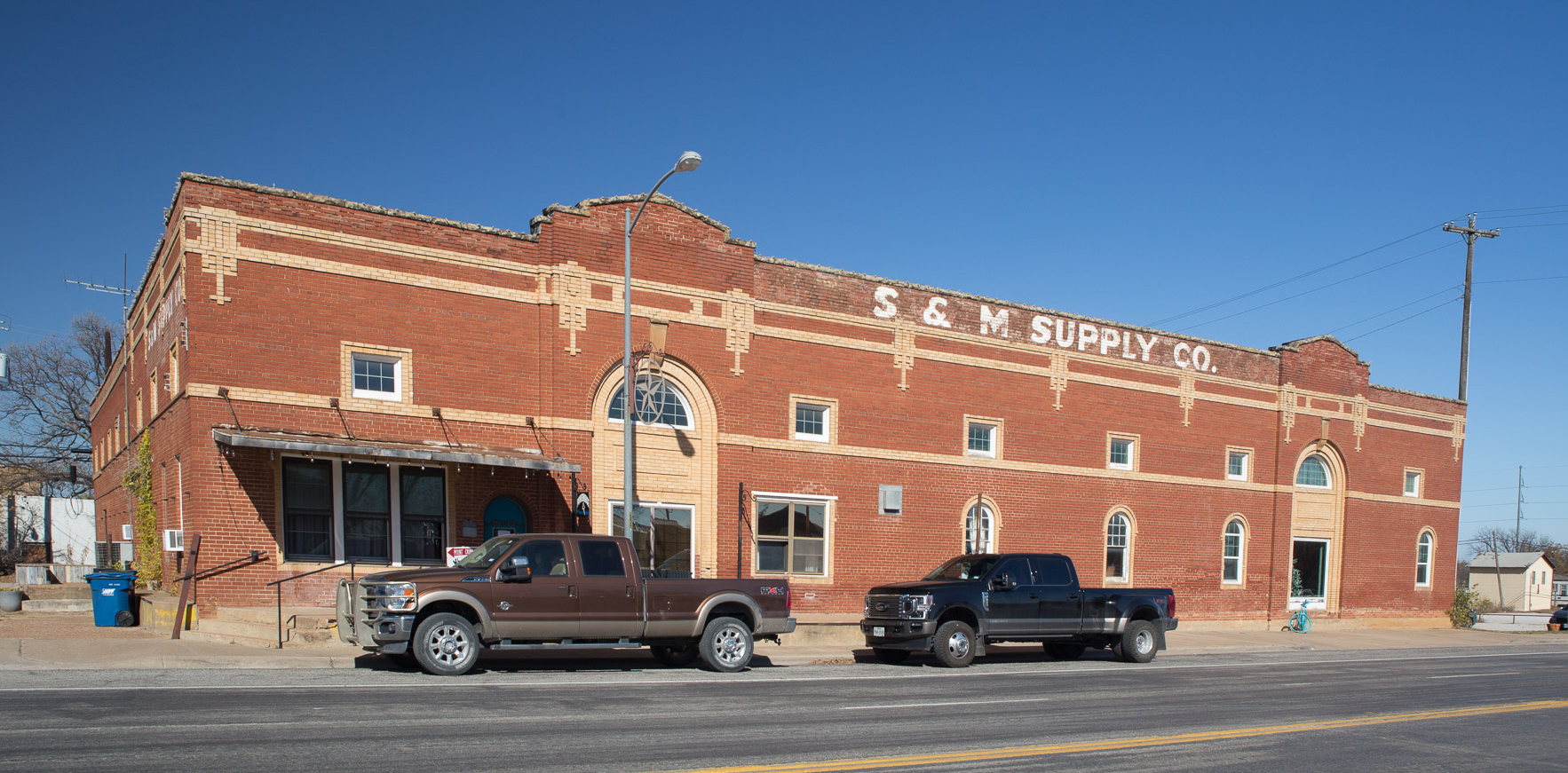
S&M Supply Company Building

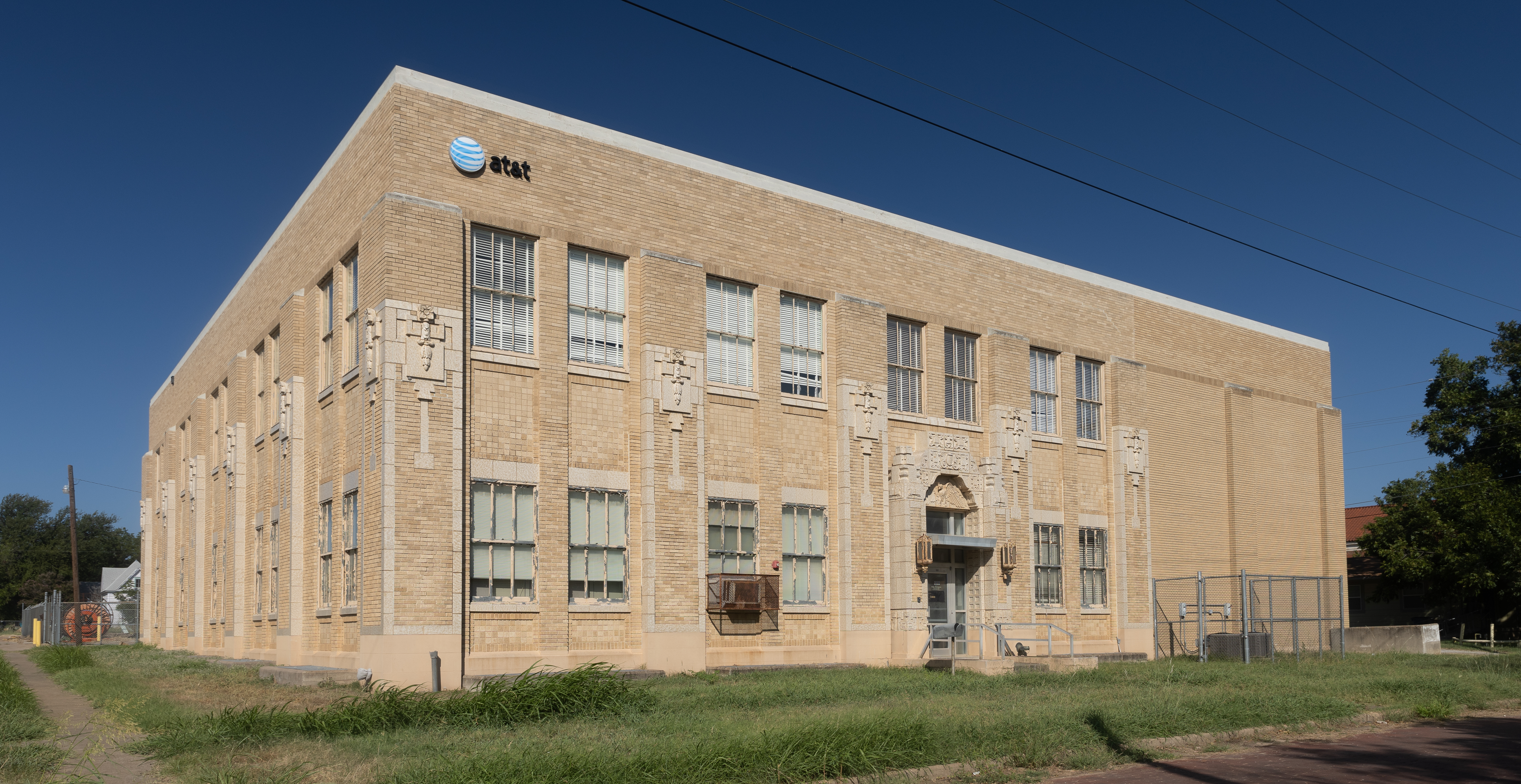
Telephone Building

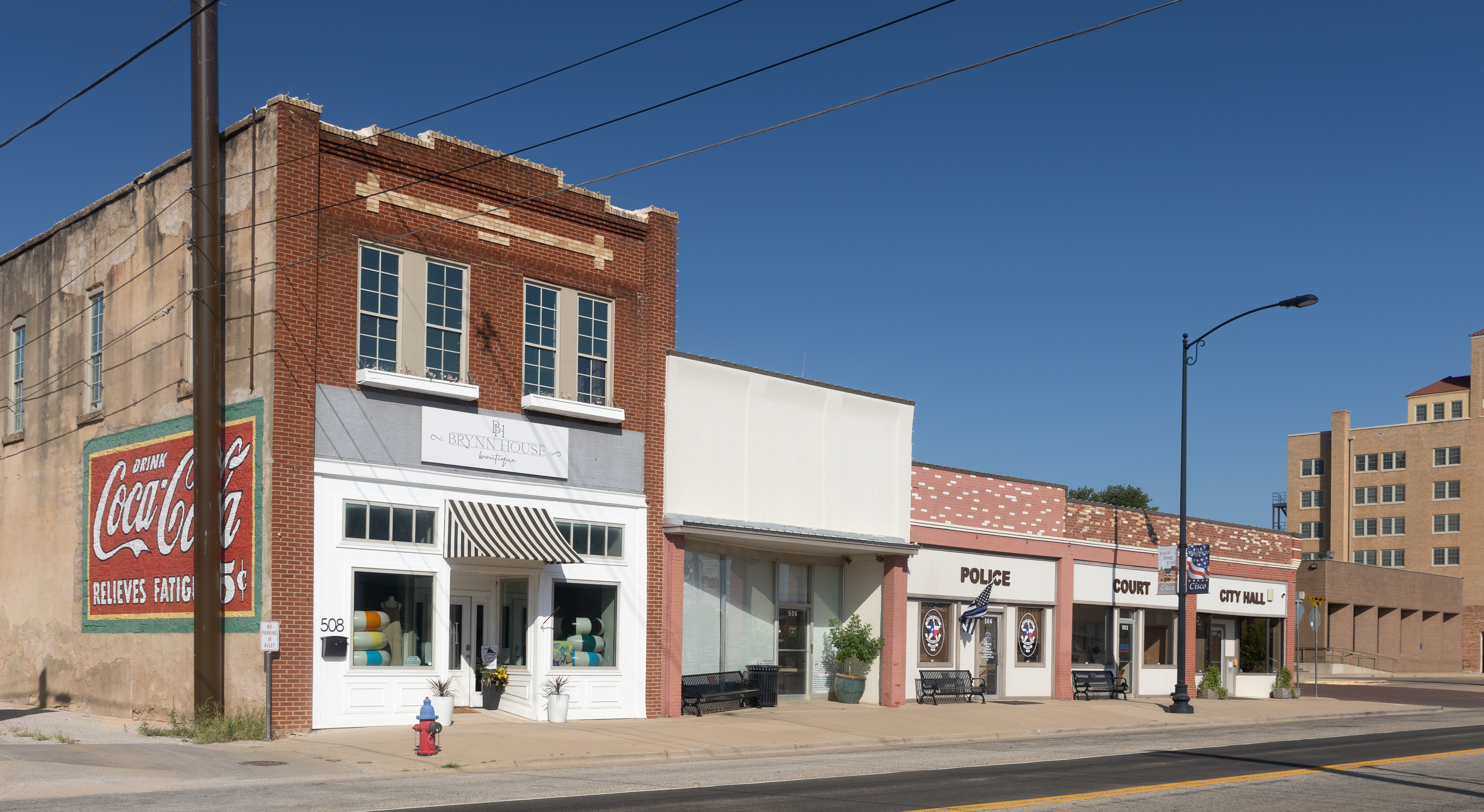
Downtown Cisco

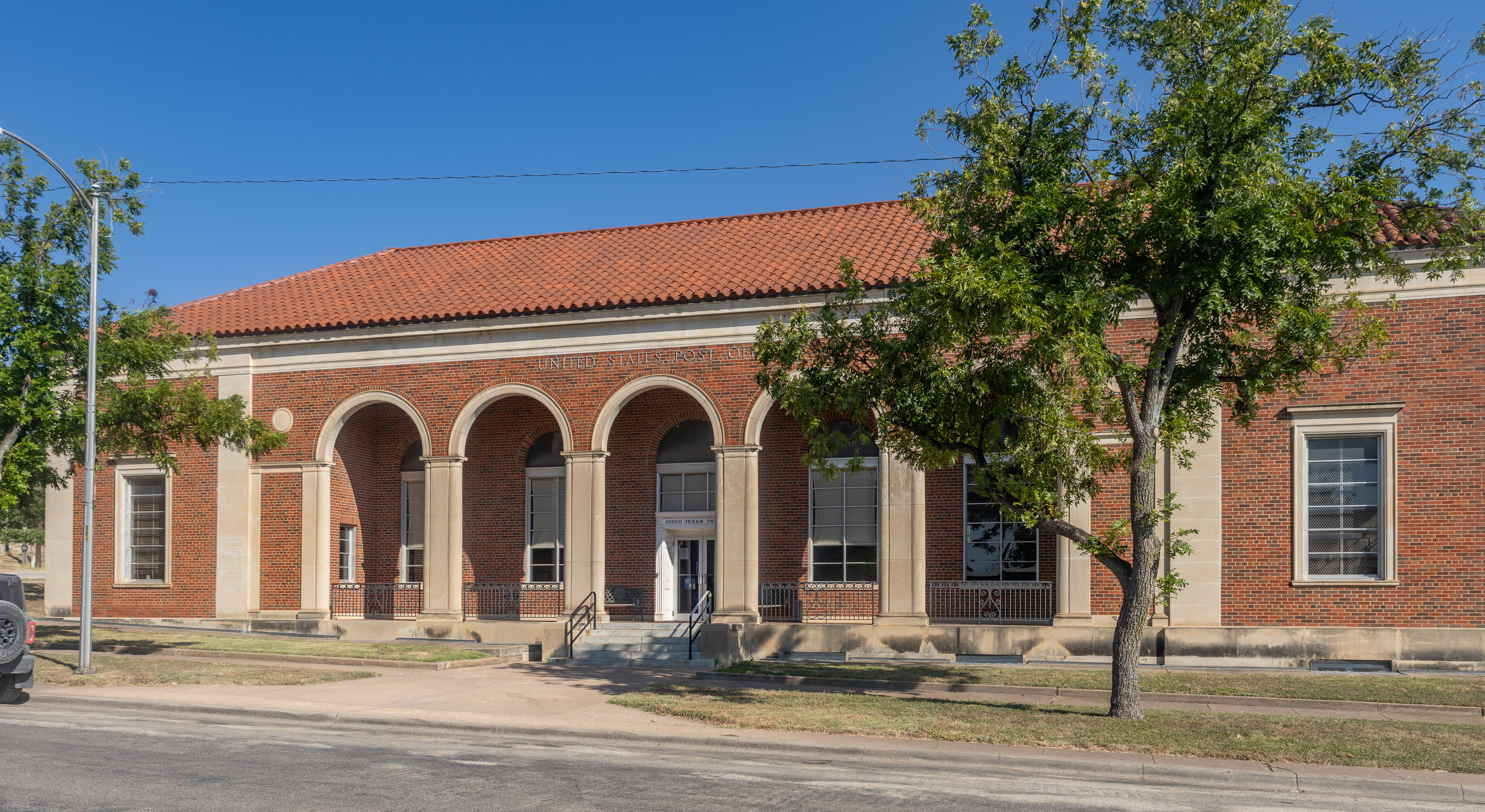
United States Post Office
