= Greenwood, Wise County, Texas =

Unincorporated community in Texas, US

Coordinates: 33°22′51″N 97°28′28″W

Greenwood is an unincorporated community in Wise County, Texas, United States.

== History ==
Pioneer settlers came to this area as early as the 1850s. Local tradition states that the Greenwood and Hart families were among the first settlers in the area, and that the community was named for the Greenwood family and the Creek for the Hart family.

As the town of Greenwood began to grow, businesses, churches, a cemetery, school, and masonic lodge were established. A Post Office was opened in 1877, and a town well was dug by John Karr Berry in the early 1890s. At its peak, the town boasted two saloons, four grocery stores, two drug stores, a hotel, bank, hardware store, barber shop, blacksmith shop, cotton gin, and the Greenwood Gazette Newspaper, the Greenwood Male and Female College, although in operation for less than twenty years, provided quality education for the young people of the community.

This small settlement has served as a supply center for surrounding farming communities for over one hundred years. It has also been a center of social and religious activities. Three churches serve the Greenwood area: Greenwood Baptist Church, founded as Hart's Creek Missionary Baptist Church about 1872, Greenwood Methodist Church, founded about 1880, and Greenwood Church of Christ, founded in 1896.

== Education ==
The Slidell Independent School District serves area students.
