= Pampa Independent School District =

School district in Texas

Location
- 1233 North Hobart Street, Pampa, TX, 79065 United States of America

District information
- Type: Public
- Motto: Purpose, Passion, and Pride
- Grades: PK - 12
- Superintendent: Hugh Piatt

Other information
- Website: https://www.pampaisd.net

Pampa Independent School District is a public school district based in Pampa, Texas (USA).

Located in Gray County, the district extends into portions of Roberts County. The school district has 3,446 students for 2010–2011 school year according to the district profile on the Texas Education Agency. In 2011, the school district was rated "academically acceptable" by the Texas Education Agency. However, for the 2011 school year, Pampa High School and Pampa Junior High School were both rated academically unacceptable.

== Landmark Lawsuit ==
In a landmark legal case filed in 2009, Terrell v. Pampa ISD (Case No. 07-10-00212 CV), a teacher accused the Board of Trustees and Superintendent Haenisch of willfully violating the Texas Open Meetings Act. The allegations included Pampa ISD intentionally failing to post internet website notices of its board meetings, allowing unauthorized clerical staff to sign public notices on behalf of the board of trustees, posting public notices in an unlawful location, and other violations of the Texas Open Meetings Act during the 2008–2009 school year and for eight years prior. Pampa ISD admitted that the internet website notices did not appear on its website from January 2009 to May 2009 in violation of the law, but claimed in its court filings that the school district had a technical problem with its internet website that lasted for five months without its knowledge.

On April 29, 2011, Justice Mackey Hancock of the Seventh Court of Appeals, in Amarillo, Texas, ruled against the school district and reversed Pampa District Judge Lee Waters' judgement for Pampa ISD. In filing with the court, the teacher has requested punitive special damages against Pampa school district for intentionally violating the Texas Open Meetings Act for several years.

On October 9, 2013, visiting Judge Abe Lopez ruled for Pampa ISD, awarding the school district $30,000 in attorney fees. The case is currently on its second appeal in the Seventh Court of Appeals in Amarillo, Texas (Case No. 07-14-00014 CV).

== Schools ==
=== Elementary ===
==== Travis Elementary ====
For the 2011 school year, Travis Elementary was rated acceptable by the Texas Education Agency.

===== History =====
Travis Elementary History Travis Elementary was completed in 1959 to serve the influx of Baby Boomer families into Pampa after World War II. The school was named in honor of William Barret Travis, a hero of the Battle of the Alamo during the Texas Revolution. Each March 6, the schools flies the flag of the Constitution of 1824 which was the flag flown by the defenders in the Alamo. Travis was originally built with 16 classrooms, a cafeteria, a gym, and an administrative area. Six additional classrooms and two restrooms were added to the East wing approximately twenty-five years later. In 1997 all areas were remodeled and a new wing with thirteen classrooms was added. A new media center was made from three of the old rooms, and the administrative area was enlarged to create a reception area, principal's office, nurse's office, secretary's office, records room, conference room, and a two restrooms for the staff. A modern twenty station computer lab was developed for use by all grades. Today Travis has approximately 370 students in grades kindergarten through fifth and a staff of 50 full or part-time employees.

===== School Colors =====
Green and White

===== Austin Elementary =====
For the 2011 school year, Austin Elementary was rated recognized by the Texas Education Agency.

====== School Colors ======
Blue and White

===== Wilson Elementary =====
For the 2011 school year, Wilson Elementary was rated acceptable by the Texas Education Agency.

====== School Colors ======
Red and White

===== Lamar Elementary =====
For the 2011 school year, Lamar Elementary was rated recognized by the Texas Education Agency.

====== History ======
Lamar Elementary School was built in 1953 when Knox Kinard was Superintendent of Schools and H.R. Thompson was the Board of Trustees president. The building was named for Mirabeau Bonaparte Lamar, a Texas hero who is known as the Father of Texas Education. The elementary school is located at 1234 S. Nelson in Pampa, TX. on the southern borders of the city. It serves about 430 children in pre-school through grade 5. It is the only elementary school in the Pampa district that offers the Preschool Program for Children with Disabilities, Heat Start classes, and pre-school classes. The school also has a vital parent program that includes parenting classes, as well as ESL and GED classes. A parent liaison coordinates parent groups and school volunteers. The building has a gymnasium and a cafeteria and two playground areas. The campus has a library of about 10,000 volumes and a Family Literacy Center that offers a set of computers for family and student use.

====== School Colors ======
Purple and Yellow

==== Pampa Junior High School ====
For the 2011 school year, Pampa Junior High School was rated academically unacceptable by the Texas Education Agency.

===== School Colors =====
Green and Gold

==== Pampa High School ====
For the 2011 school year, Pampa High School was rated academically unacceptable by the Texas Education Agency.

===== History =====
The 10 acres (40,000 m^{2}) purchased for $2,000 on the north edge of town in 1929 was first used for athletic purposes. As the school outgrew the central campus, Work Progress Administration work began on a large high school building at 111 E. Harvester. Later a music and art addition to the east, a field house, a woodshop and homebound class building, a music building, the remodeling of the library and girls gymnasium, an athletic building, new tennis courts, stadium improvements, a cinder track, an area vocational building, and paved parking lot and baseball diamond have been added to keep pace with the changing times. Off Price Road is an area purchased for an F.F.A. livestock feeding facility.

Campus structures named to honor outstanding teachers or students include Clifton McNeely Field House named for the outstanding basketball coach who led the Harvesters to four state basketball championships during his 1947–1960 term. Matson Track was named for Pampa High's only Olympic champion, Randy Matson. In 1984 the livestock feedlots were named in honor of Bob Skaggs.

===== School Colors =====
Green and Gold

The Harvesters

===== School Songs =====
"Dear Ol' Pampa High School" sung to the tune of "Let Me Call You Sweetheart".

===== Fight Song =====
On Ye Harvesters! On Ye Harvesters Fight on down that line. Toss the ball clear down the field. A touchdown sure this time Rah! Rah! Rah! On ye Harvesters! On ye Harvesters! Fight on for your fame. Fight! Harvesters, Fight! Fight! Fight! And win this game Go Green!

To the music of “On Wisconsin”

===== DateLine NBC =====
The Pampa High School football team was featured on Dateline NBC in 2006. "Every Friday night, small town America shows its spirit on fields like Harvester. This is a story about football—intensely and passionately played. But it is also a story of family, friendship and faith."

==== Pampa Learning Center ====
The Pampa Learning Center is a school of choice for students between the ages of 16 and 21. Student apply to attend this small self-paced school. The student body is composed of students who have dropped out of school or were at risk of becoming dropouts. Many are either teen parents or soon to be parents. They offer basic high school curriculum and an excellent Teen Parenting program with Day care available. They also offer a GED pre program for qualified students.

== 2004-2011 T.E.A. Campus Accountability Ratings ==
In 2004, under the Texas Education Agency's accountability ratings system, Austin Elementary and Travis Elementary achieved Recognized ratings for the 2003–2004 academic school year. All remaining campuses in the district were rated Academically Acceptable.

For the 2004-2005 monitoring period, Austin Elementary received sole Recognized status, with all remaining campuses being rated Academically Acceptable.

Pampa High School received a rating of Academically Unacceptable for the year 2005–2006. Austin Elementary and Travis Elementary received Recognized rating.

The 2007 TEA accountability ratings show all campuses in Pampa ISD were rated at least Academically Acceptable. Austin Elementary and Lamar Elementary received Recognized status, marking a first-time achievement for Lamar Elementary under the new TEA Rating System adopted in 2004. Since the new Rating System began in 2004, Austin Elementary has achieved Recognized status four consecutive years.

The 2011 TEA accountability ratings show Pampa ISD was rated Academically Acceptable. However, Pampa High School and Pampa Junior High School were rated Academically Unacceptable. Austin and Lamar Elementary were rated recognized and Wilson and Travis Elementary were rated acceptable. There are no exemplary schools.
