= Pampa, Texas =

- City
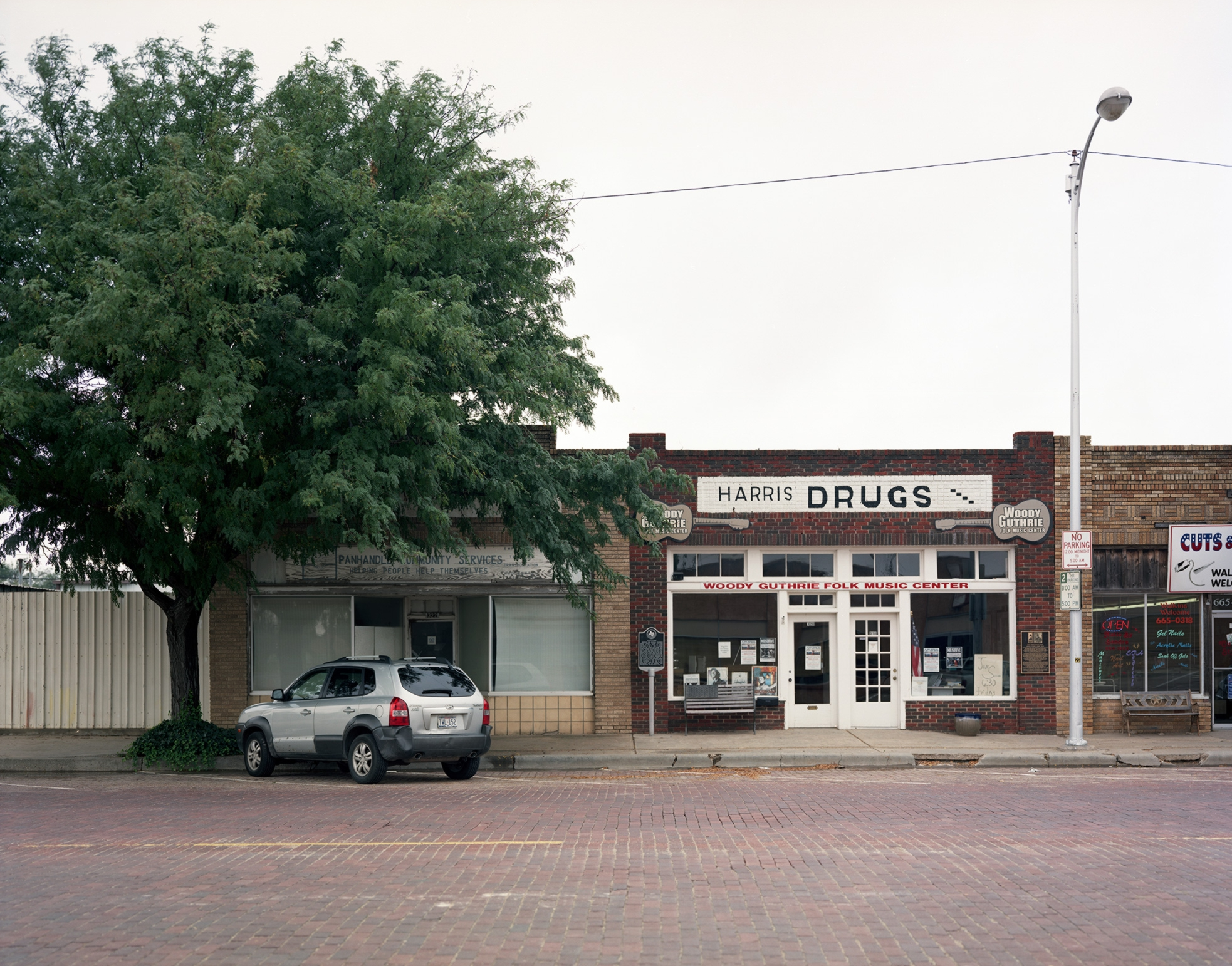
- Pampa business district

- Coordinates: 35°32′52″N 100°57′54″W
- Country: United States
- State: Texas
- County: Gray

Government
  - Type: Council-Manager

Area
  - Total: 9.02 sq mi (23.36 km^{2})
  - Land: 9.02 sq mi (23.36 km^{2})
  - Water: 0 sq mi (0.00 km^{2})
- Elevation: 3,225 ft (983 m)

Population (2020)
  - Total: 16,867
  - Density: 1,870.1/sq mi (722.05/km^{2})
- Time zone: UTC-6 (Central (CST))
  - Summer (DST): UTC-5 (CDT)
- ZIP codes: 79065-79066
- Area code: 806
- FIPS code: 48-54912
- GNIS feature ID =: 1364740
- Website: www.cityofpampa.org

Pampa (from the Quechua: pampa, meaning "plain") is a city in Gray County, Texas, United States. Its population was 16,867 as of the 2020 census. Pampa is the county seat of Gray County and is the principal city of the Pampa micropolitan statistical area, which includes both Gray and Roberts Counties. Pampa is named after the Pampas Lowlands in Argentina, Uruguay, and southern Brazil.

Each year in August, Pampa hosts the Top o' Texas Rodeo, which brings competitors from Texas and the surrounding states to Gray County. The White Deer Land Company Museum, which showcases ranching exhibits, is located in downtown Pampa.

== History ==
In 1888, the Santa Fe Railroad was constructed through the area where Pampa would be established. A rail station and telegraph office were built, and the townsite was laid out by George Tyng, manager of the White Deer Lands ranch. The town was first called "Glasgow", then "Sutton", and then the name was changed to "Pampa" after the pampas grasslands of South America at Mr. Tyng's suggestion. Timothy Dwight Hobart, a native of Vermont, sold plots of land for the town only to people who agreed to settle there and develop the land, and Pampa soon became a center for agriculture. Gas and oil were discovered in the Texas Panhandle in 1916. Pampa prospered greatly in the resulting oil boom, and the Gray County seat of government was moved in 1928 from Lefors to Pampa.

The Army Air Forces Training Command operated the Pampa Army Air Field that was in operation from 1942 to 1945. The former base is located near the intersection of SH 152 and FM 1474, about 10 miles east of the town.

=== 1995 tornado ===
On June 8, 1995, a violent tornado hit the industrial section on the west side of Pampa, destroying or damaging about 250 businesses and homes. It resulted in $30 million in damage and was the costliest and the most destructive tornado on record for this town. It had a three-mile-long path and was 200 yards wide. At its peak, the tornado was rated an F4 on the Fujita scale.

== Geography ==
Pampa is located in northwestern Gray County. According to the United States Census Bureau, the city has a total land area of 9.0 square miles (23.2 km^{2}), all land.

U.S. Route 60 passes through Pampa, leading northeast 46 miles (74 km) to Canadian and southwest 54 miles (87 km) to Amarillo. Texas State Highway 70 crosses US 60 in the southwestern part of Pampa and leads north 62 miles (100 km) to Perryton and south 24 miles (39 km) to Interstate 40.

=== Climate ===
According to the Köppen Climate Classification system, Pampa has a humid subtropical climate, abbreviated "Cfa" on climate maps. The hottest temperature recorded in Pampa was 111 °F (43.9 °C) on June 25, 1980, while the coldest temperature recorded was −12 °F (−24.4 °C) on January 11, 1962.

Climate data for Pampa, Texas, 1991–2020 normals, extremes 1908–present
Month	Jan	Feb	Mar	Apr	May	Jun	Jul	Aug	Sep	Oct	Nov	Dec	Year
Record high °F (°C)	85 (29)	89 (32)	101 (38)	98 (37)	104 (40)	111 (44)	109 (43)	109 (43)	105 (41)	99 (37)	91 (33)	86 (30)	111 (44)
Mean maximum °F (°C)	72.4 (22.4)	77.0 (25.0)	84.2 (29.0)	89.3 (31.8)	95.1 (35.1)	99.4 (37.4)	101.8 (38.8)	100.2 (37.9)	96.8 (36.0)	90.5 (32.5)	80.7 (27.1)	72.5 (22.5)	103.3 (39.6)
Mean daily maximum °F (°C)	50.2 (10.1)	53.6 (12.0)	62.7 (17.1)	70.9 (21.6)	79.5 (26.4)	88.4 (31.3)	92.8 (33.8)	91.3 (32.9)	83.7 (28.7)	72.5 (22.5)	60.4 (15.8)	50.4 (10.2)	71.4 (21.9)
Daily mean °F (°C)	36.7 (2.6)	39.6 (4.2)	48.1 (8.9)	56.4 (13.6)	65.9 (18.8)	75.5 (24.2)	79.9 (26.6)	78.4 (25.8)	70.8 (21.6)	58.7 (14.8)	46.6 (8.1)	37.5 (3.1)	57.8 (14.4)
Mean daily minimum °F (°C)	23.2 (−4.9)	25.7 (−3.5)	33.4 (0.8)	41.9 (5.5)	52.3 (11.3)	62.5 (16.9)	66.9 (19.4)	65.6 (18.7)	58.0 (14.4)	44.9 (7.2)	32.8 (0.4)	24.7 (−4.1)	44.3 (6.8)
Mean minimum °F (°C)	8.5 (−13.1)	10.7 (−11.8)	17.1 (−8.3)	26.9 (−2.8)	37.6 (3.1)	51.2 (10.7)	59.0 (15.0)	57.4 (14.1)	44.0 (6.7)	28.5 (−1.9)	16.6 (−8.6)	8.7 (−12.9)	2.9 (−16.2)
Record low °F (°C)	−12 (−24)	−11 (−24)	−6 (−21)	12 (−11)	25 (−4)	40 (4)	51 (11)	47 (8)	31 (−1)	12 (−11)	5 (−15)	−8 (−22)	−12 (−24)
Average precipitation inches (mm)	0.79 (20)	0.63 (16)	1.46 (37)	2.21 (56)	2.84 (72)	3.19 (81)	2.50 (64)	3.09 (78)	1.93 (49)	2.22 (56)	0.98 (25)	0.95 (24)	22.79 (578)
Average snowfall inches (cm)	3.3 (8.4)	3.3 (8.4)	1.8 (4.6)	0.6 (1.5)	0.2 (0.51)	0.0 (0.0)	0.0 (0.0)	0.0 (0.0)	0.0 (0.0)	0.7 (1.8)	1.5 (3.8)	4.3 (11)	15.7 (40.01)
Average precipitation days (≥ 0.01 in)	3.9	4.1	5.6	5.8	7.9	8.4	7.1	8.2	6.0	5.4	4.3	4.5	71.2
Average snowy days (≥ 0.1 in)	1.8	1.8	0.9	0.3	0.1	0.0	0.0	0.0	0.0	0.3	0.7	2.0	7.9
Source: NOAA

== Demographics ==
Historical population
Census	Pop.	Note	%±
1920	987		—
1930	10,470		960.8%
1940	12,895		23.2%
1950	16,583		28.6%
1960	24,664		48.7%
1970	21,726		−11.9%
1980	21,396		−1.5%
1990	19,959		−6.7%
2000	17,887		−10.4%
2010	17,994		0.6%
2020	16,867		−6.3%
1920–2000, 2010, 2020

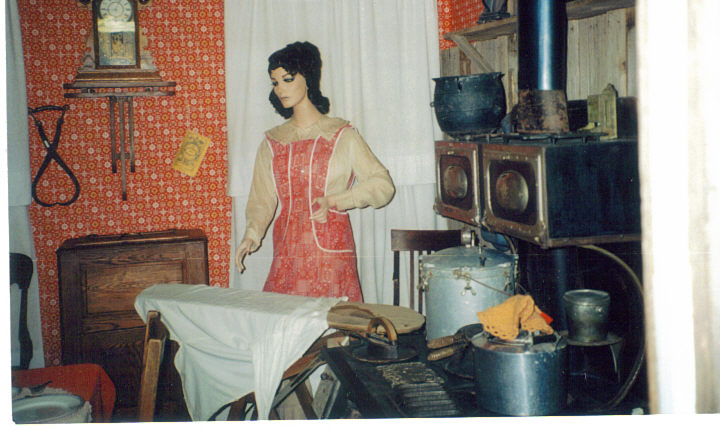
Ironing in the kitchen, ca. 1900, White Deer Museum

=== 2020 census ===
Racial composition as of the 2020 census
Race	Number	Percent
White	11,571	68.6%
Black or African American	467	2.8%
American Indian and Alaska Native	170	1.0%
Asian	114	0.7%
Native Hawaiian and Other Pacific Islander	0	0.0%
Some other race	2,075	12.3%
Two or more races	2,470	14.6%
Hispanic or Latino (of any race)	5,494	32.6%

As of the 2020 census, there were 16,867 people, 6,689 households, and 4,234 families residing in the city.

The median age was 37.7 years, 26.5% of residents were under the age of 18, and 17.5% of residents were 65 years of age or older. For every 100 females there were 97.7 males, and for every 100 females age 18 and over there were 93.6 males age 18 and over.

99.4% of residents lived in urban areas, while 0.6% lived in rural areas.

There were 6,689 households in Pampa, of which 33.7% had children under the age of 18 living in them. Of all households, 48.4% were married-couple households, 19.3% were households with a male householder and no spouse or partner present, and 27.2% were households with a female householder and no spouse or partner present. About 29.6% of all households were made up of individuals and 14.2% had someone living alone who was 65 years of age or older.

There were 8,409 housing units, of which 20.5% were vacant. The homeowner vacancy rate was 3.8% and the rental vacancy rate was 20.4%.

=== 2010 Census ===
As of the census of 2010, 17,994 people resided in Pampa, a 0.6% increase from 2000. The population density was 2,008.3 inhabitants per square mile (775.4/km^{2}). The racial makeup of the city was 80.9% White, 3.3% Black, 0.8% American Indian or Alaskan Native, 0.4% Asian, had 2.6% reporting two or more races. Hispanics or Latinos of any race were 26% of the population.

The 7,123 households (2006–2010) averaged 2.6 persons per household. Persons under 18 years of age accounted for 27%, and under 5 years of age accounted for 8.1% of the population. Persons over age 65 accounted for 16% of the population.

The median household income was $40,358, with the per capita income in the past 12 months (2010 dollars) 2006–2010 being $22,025. The home ownership rate (2006–2010) was 76.2%, with the median value of owner-occupied housing units was $65,300.

=== 2000 Census ===
As of the census of 2000, 17,887 people, 7,387 households, and 5,074 families were residing in the city. The population density was 2,050.0 inhabitants per square mile (791.5/km^{2}). The 8,785 housing units averaged 1,006.8 per mi^{2} (388.5/km^{2}). The racial makeup of the city was 83.69% White, 3.85% African American, 1.07% Native American, 0.41% Asian, 8.25% from other races, and 2.73% from two or more races. Hispanics or Latinos of any race were 13.72% of the population.

Of the 7,387 households, 30.4% had children under the age of 18 living with them, 55.9% were married couples living together, 9.8% had a female householder with no husband present, and 31.3% were not families. About 28.8% of all households were made up of individuals, and 15.3% had someone living alone who was 65 years of age or older. The average household size was 2.39, and the average family size was 2.94.

In the city, the age distribution was 25.9% under the age of 18, 7.4% from 18 to 24, 25.4% from 25 to 44, 22.6% from 45 to 64, and 18.7% who were 65 years of age or older. The median age was 39 years. For every 100 females, there were 91.0 males. For every 100 females age 18 and over, there were 86.8 males.

The median income for a household in the city was $31,213, and for a family was $39,810. Males had a median income of $32,717 versus $20,492 for females. The per capita income for the city was $17,791. About 12.1% of families and 14.8% of the population were below the poverty line, including 19.7% of those under age 18 and 9.4% of those age 65 or over.

== Education ==
The city is served by the Pampa Independent School District. The school district administers four elementary schools (Austin, Lamar, Travis, and Wilson) and one junior high school. Pampa High School and the nontraditional Pampa Learning Center are also part of the school system.

Pampa is also served by the Pampa Center branch of Clarendon College.

=== Library ===
The library traces its roots to a group of literary-minded women who organized a “Ladies Library Club” in January of 1907. The current Lovett Memorial Library building was constructed on the entire west half of the 100 block of North Houston Street, and was dedicated on January 18, 1955. In 1985, the Harrington Foundation of Amarillo paid for the computerization of library records, joining the library for the first time into a consortium with most of the public libraries in the Panhandle. By the mid-1990s, Lovett Library was showing its age, and not compliant with the Americans for Disabilities Act. In October 1995, it was announced that Mrs. Ruth Ann Holland has left $500,000 to the Library Foundation in her will.

In 1996, the Lovett Library Foundation, which managed the Holland bequest and several other substantial bequests, announced that a plan was being made to extensive renovate the old building. In January 1998, the library staff, along with all books and much equipment, moved from the Houston Street facility to the old B. M. Baker school on the south side, where the library was set up in the cafeteria and classroom annex in the south part of the school complex.

This freed the old building on Houston Street for renovation. The children's area was moved to the second floor; a bridge was built between the second floor facility and other children's rooms in the south part of the building; an elevator was installed; new shelves, lighting, and ceiling tiles were installed; and the building was made completely ADA compliant.

In June 2003, it was announced that R. L. Franklin, prominent rancher of Pampa, would donate two statues to the library to honor the 50th anniversary of the opening of the building in January 1955. One statue, by Don Ray of Channing, represents a seated woman reading to a child; this is erected in front of the library. Another statue representing a Pioneer Woman was by David Frech of New York was placed in the library's Reading Garden. Both statues were dedicated to four local women, including the donor's mother, each of whom had a long involvement with the library. The statues were dedicated on January 9, 2005, and at one of the dedicatory events, author Elmer Kelton was the guest speaker.

== Media ==
The Pampa News, a daily newspaper published in Pampa, serves Pampa and the surrounding areas of Gray County. The paper is published 3 times a week.

Pampa is served by four commercial radio stations. KGRO 1230 AM, KOMX 100.3 FM, and KRWP 103.3 FM serve the Panhandle region with local news. KGRO went on the air in 1966, and has been the longtime home of Pampa Harvester sports. The stations are owned by Southwest Media Group-Pampa LLC.

KHNZ 101.3 FM is a classic country station owned by Route 66 Media of Shamrock.

== Notable people ==
- Black Bart, retired professional wrestler
- Cody Canada, American southern rock/alt-country artist
- Mary Castle (1931–1998), actress
- Duane Lee Chapman, or Dog the Bounty Hunter, was raised in Pampa
- Warren Chisum, politician
- Gene Cockrell, American football player
- Gerald J. Ford, most recently the Chairman of the Trustees of Southern Methodist University in Dallas
- Ben H. Guill (1909–1994), Republican U.S. representative from Texas's 18th congressional district from 1950 to 1951
- Woody Guthrie, moved to Pampa with his father Charles Guthrie and attended high school there briefly
- John Jenkins, former University of Houston head football coach
- Randy Matson, a former World Champion shot putter
- Tom Mechler, state chairman of the Republican Party of Texas from 2015 to 2017
- T. Boone Pickens, chairman of the private equity firm BP Capital Management, and former CEO of Mesa Petroleum
- Trae Young, basketball player (point guard)
- Zach Thomas, retired National Football League Hall of Fame linebacker
- Billy Klapper, spur and bit maker known for creating and producing many unique spurs and bits for the ranching community
