= Slidell Independent School District =

School district in Texas

Location
- Slidell, TX ESC Region 11 USA

District information
- Type: Public
- Motto: On Track and Leading the Pack
- Grades: Pre-K through 12
- Established: $4.52 million (2015-2016)
- Superintendent: Taylor Williams
- NCES District ID: 4840470

Students and staff
- Students: 242 (2017-2018)
- Teachers: 21.76 (2017-2018)
- Staff: 39.87 (2017-2018)
- Athletic conference: UIL Class A (non-football member)
- District mascot: Greyhound
- Colors: orange and blue

Other information
- Website: www.slidellisd.net

Slidell Independent School District is a public school district based in the community of Slidell, Texas (USA). Located in Wise County, a portion of the district extends into Denton, Cooke, and Montague counties. The small community of Greenwood also lies within the district.

== Schools ==
Slidell ISD has two campuses -

- Slidell Junior High/High School (Grades 7-12)
- Slidell Elementary (Grades PK-6)

In 2009, the school district was rated "academically acceptable" by the Texas Education Agency.
