= Slidell, Texas =

Unincorporated community in Texas, US

Coordinates: 33°21′35″N 97°23′30″W

Slidell is an unincorporated community in Wise County, Texas, United States. Slidell was named for John Slidell, a 19th-century U.S. Senator and C.S.A. diplomat.

== Education ==
The Slidell Independent School District serves area students and home to the Slidell High School Greyhounds.
