= Slidell High School (Texas) =

Location
- 1 Greyhound Lane; Slidell, Texas 76267-0069; United States; 33.359127°N 97.395269°W

Information
- School type: Public High School
- School district: Slidell Independent School District
- Principal: Theresa Stevens
- Staff: 40.71 (FTE)
- Grades: PK-12
- Enrollment: 482 (2023–2024)
- Student to teacher ratio: 11.84
- Colors: Royal Blue & Orange
- Athletics conference: UIL Class 2A
- Mascot: Greyhound
- Yearbook: Greyhound
- Website: Slidell High School

Slidell High School or Slidell School is a public high school located in Slidell, Texas (USA). It is part of the Slidell Independent School District located in far northeast Wise County and classified as a 2A school by the UIL. In 2015, the school was rated "Met Standard" by the Texas Education Agency.

== Academics ==
- UIL Academic Meet Champions
  - 2015(1A)

== Athletics ==
The Slidell Greyhounds compete in these sports -

- Basketball
- Cross Country
- Golf
- Powerlifting
- Tennis
- Track and Field

=== State titles ===
- Boys Basketball -
  - 1942(B), 1943(B), 2019(1A)
- Boys Cross Country
  - 2023(1A)
- Girls Basketball -
  - 1963(B)

== Notable alumni ==
Clifton McNeely (June 22, 1919 - December 26, 2003) was an American basketball player and coach.
