= Allison, Wise County, Texas =

- Unincorporated community
- Location within Texas Location within the United States
- Coordinates: 33°15′59″N 97°25′36″W
- Country: United States
- State: Texas
- County: Wise
- Elevation: 830 ft (250 m)
- Time zone: UTC-6 (Central (CST))
  - Summer (DST): UTC-5 (CDT)
- ZIP code: 76234
- Area code: 940
- GNIS feature ID: 1379334

Allison is an unincorporated community in Wise County, Texas, United States. The community is located east of Decatur, and west of Denton on U.S. Route 380.

== History ==
The land was owned by Daniel Waggoner, and his son William Thomas Wagoner. The family owned the Waggoner Mansion in nearby Decatur. The area was notably used by outlaws Jesse, Frank James and Sam Bass as a hiding place.

Following the death of William Thomas Waggoner, the family land was divided amongst the children, a daughter Electra Waggoner sold her land to businessmen from Waxahachie and Dallas. In 1911 the name Allison was chosen, named after local judge E.M Allison. The community never developed fully due to a promised railway line never being constructed.

== Education ==
Allison is served by the Decatur Independent School District.
