= Electra Waggoner Biggs =

American sculptor (1912–2001)

- Born: November 8, 1912
- Died: April 23, 2001 (aged 88)
- Resting place: West Hill Cemetery, Sherman, Texas, U.S.
- Occupation: Sculptor
- Spouse: 2, including John Biggs
- Children: Electra, Helen
- Parent(s): E. Paul Waggoner; Helen Waggoner
- Relatives: Daniel Waggoner (paternal great-grandfather); William Thomas Waggoner (paternal grandfather); Harlow H. Curtice (brother-in-law); Gene Willingham (son-in-law)

Electra Waggoner Biggs (November 8, 1912 – April 23, 2001) was a Texas-born heiress, socialite and artist, and owner of a portion of the Waggoner Ranch in Texas. She is widely known for her sculptures of Will Rogers, Dwight Eisenhower, Harry Truman, Bob Hope, Knute Rockne and numerous other prominent subjects.

Both the Lockheed L-188 Electra turboprop, and the Buick Electra, were named after Biggs, the latter by her brother-in-law, Harlow H. Curtice, former president of Buick and later president of General Motors.

== Early life ==
Biggs was born on November 8, 1912, and was named after her aunt, Electra Waggoner, after whom the town of Electra, Texas, is named. Her father, E. Paul Waggoner, was an heir to the Waggoner Ranch in Texas. Her mother Helen was a socialite.

Biggs grew up in a privileged family and attended Miss Wright's Boarding School in Pennsylvania, where she discovered a love of art — later studying sculpture in New York and at the Sorbonne in Paris. Ultimately becoming well known as a sculptor, a large collection of Biggs' works are featured at the Red River Valley Museum in Vernon, Texas.

== Sculpture ==
Most of the sculptures Biggs created were busts. They include:

- US President Harry Truman
- US Vice President John Nance Garner
- General (later US President) Dwight Eisenhower
- Sid Richardson
- Victor McLaglen
- William Thomas Waggoner
- Amon Carter Jr.
- Jacqueline Cochran
- Baron Von Wrangle, an Arrow Collar Man
- Will Rogers
- Jimmy Robinson
- Knute Rockne
- Frank Phillips
- Jack Chrysler
- Herbert Marcus

== Personal life ==
Biggs married Gordon Bowman in 1933, divorcing two years later — their wedding was photographed by Edward Steichen. Her second husband, John Biggs, worked for International Paper and together they had two daughters, Helen Biggs Willingham of Vernon, Texas and Electra (Ellie) Biggs Moulder of Jacksonville, Florida.

As well as living at the Waggoner Ranch, Biggs maintained a home at 4700 Preston Road in Dallas, designed by locally noted architect Anton Korn.

She died on April 23, 2001.
