= Waggoner National Bank of Vernon =

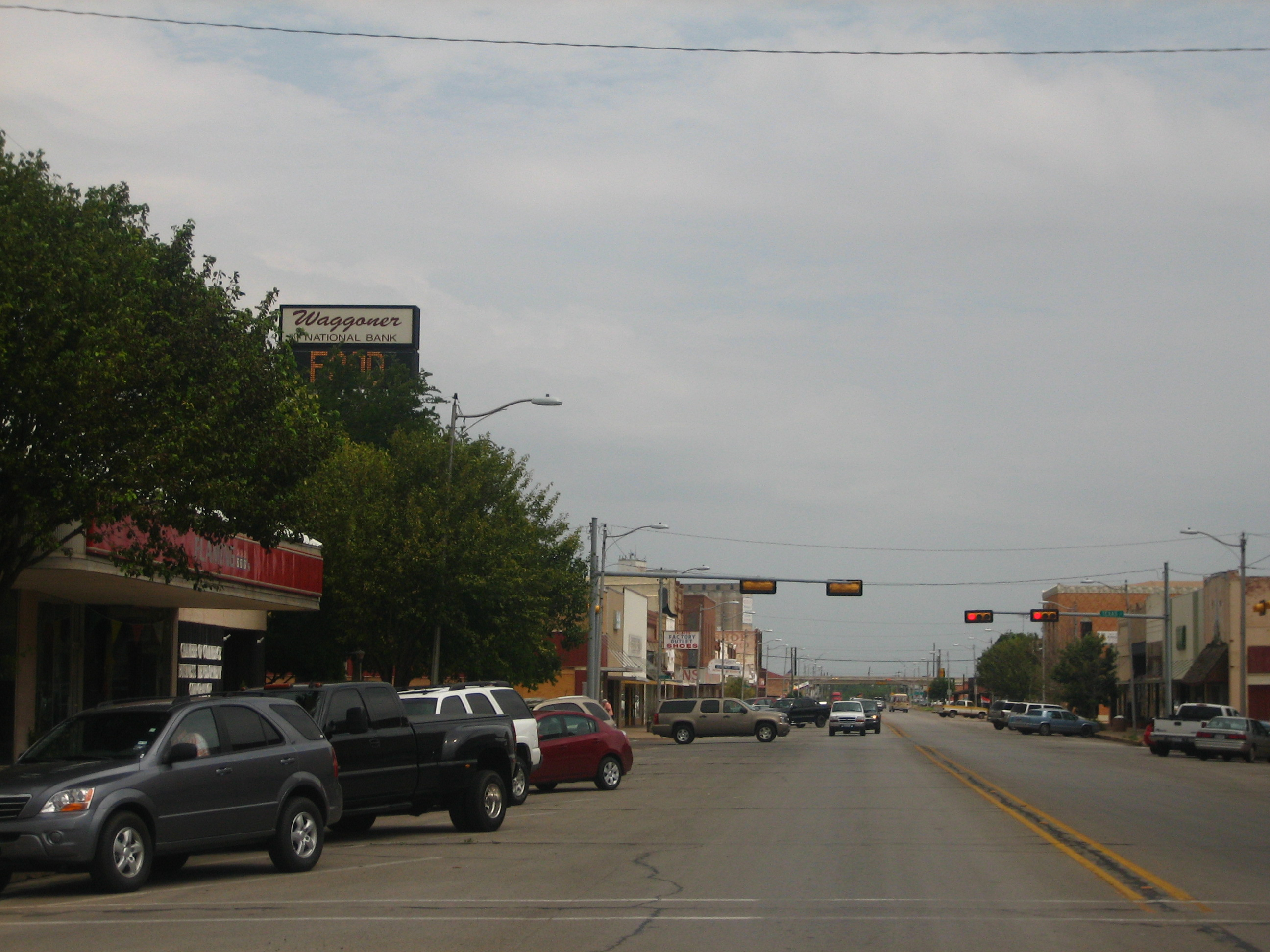
- Sign of the Waggoner National Bank in Vernon, Texas in 2008.
- Company type: Private company
- Industry: Banking
- Predecessor: R.C. Neal Banking Company
- Founded: 1899
- Founder: William Thomas Waggoner
- Headquarters: Vernon; Electra, United States of America
- Area served: Texas
- Key people: J. Michael Terrell; President & CEO
- Products: Consumer banking, corporate banking
- Subsidiaries: Vernon Bancshares, Inc.
- Website: wnbvernon.com

The Waggoner National Bank of Vernon is a historic local bank in Vernon and Electra, Texas, in the United States.

== History ==
The bank was chartered by the United States Department of the Treasury on July 3, 1899. It was the result of a former local bank founded by Mr R.C. Neal in Vernon in 1893 named the R.C. Neal Banking Company. Its founding President was William Thomas Waggoner, the owner of the Waggoner Ranch, who served in this capacity for a duration of eight years, from 1899 to 1907. The founding Vice President was L.G. Hawkins, after whom the local Hawkins Elementary School is named.

The bank is present both in Vernon in Wilbarger County and Electra in Wichita County. It is a member of the Electra Chamber of Commerce and Agriculture. It also operates the subsidiary, Vernon Bancshares, Inc.

Its board of directors includes fifteen members. The President and Chief Executive Officer is J. Michael Terrell.
