= Albert Buckman Wharton Jr. =

American rancher and polo player

- Born: August 8, 1909; Colorado Springs, Colorado, US
- Died: May 28, 1963 (aged 53); Dallas, Texas, US
- Resting place: Oakwood Cemetery
- Occupations: Rancher, polo player
- Spouse: several
- Children: Albert Buckman Wharton III
- Parent(s): Electra Waggoner; Albert Buckman Wharton
- Relatives: William Thomas Waggoner (maternal grandfather); Daniel Waggoner (maternal great-grandfather)

Albert Buckman Wharton Jr. (a.k.a. Buster Wharton) (August 8, 1909 – May 28, 1963) was an American rancher and polo player.

== Early life ==
Albert Buckman Wharton Jr. was born on August 8, 1909, in Colorado Springs, Colorado. His mother, Electra Waggoner, was a socialite and heiress to the Waggoner Ranch. His father, Albert Buckman Wharton, was a horsebreeder and a member of the Wharton family from Philadelphia. His parents met while they were traveling separately in the Himalayas. His maternal grandfather was William Thomas Waggoner and his maternal great-grandfather was Daniel Waggoner.

== Polo ==
Wharton became a polo player. He built polo fields on the Waggoner Ranch. It was known as El Ranchito Polo Club and ran polo tournaments. He played alongside polo champion Cecil Smith at the ranch.

== Personal life ==
Wharton was married several times. His last wife was Lula Waggoner.

== Death ==
He died of cirrhosis of the liver on May 28, 1963, in Dallas, Texas. He was buried at the Oakwood Cemetery in Fort Worth, Texas. He left his estate to his last wife. However, his son's mother sued her for four years, until the estate finally went to his son, who inherited it in 1970.
