= Wharton–Scott House =

Historic house in Texas, United States

- U.S. National Register of Historic Places
- Recorded Texas Historic Landmark
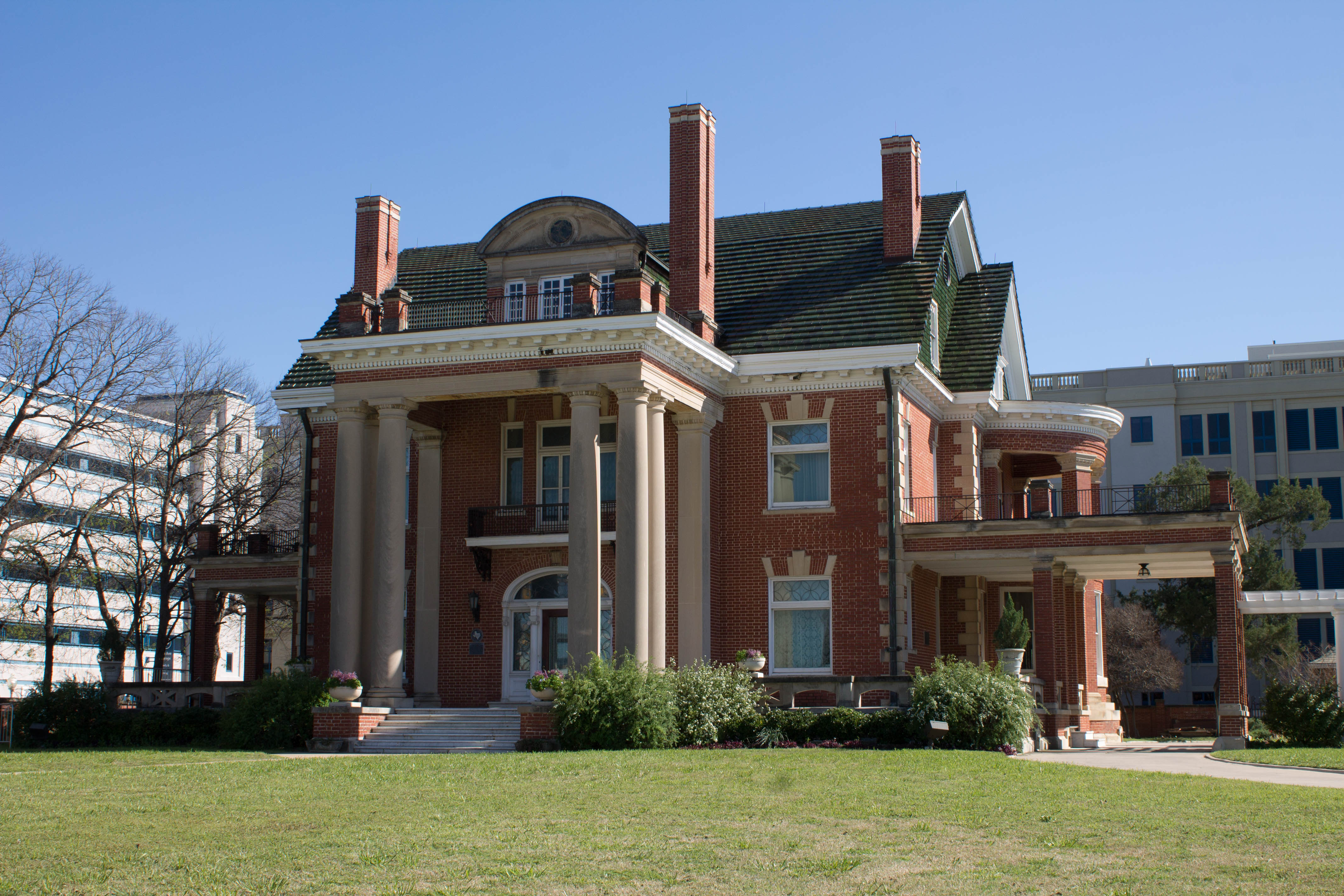
- Thistle Hill in 2016

- Location within Texas Location within the United States
- Location: 1509 Pennsylvania Ave., Fort Worth
- Coordinates: 32°44′16″N 97°20′32″W
- Area: 1.5 acres (0.61 ha)
- Built: 1906
- Architect: Sanguinet & Staats
- Architectural style: Colonial Revival, Beaux Arts, Georgian Revival
- NRHP reference No.: 75002003
- RTHL No.: 5463

Significant dates
- Added to NRHP: April 14, 1975
- Designated RTHL: 1977

Wharton–Scott House, also known as Thistle Hill, is a historic mansion in Fort Worth, Texas.

== Location ==
The mansion is located on 1509 Pennsylvania Avenue in the neighborhood of Quality Hill in Fort Worth, Tarrant County, Texas.

== History ==
The mansion was built from 1903 to 1904 for Electra Waggoner, the daughter of William Thomas Waggoner and heiress of the Waggoner Ranch, and her husband, Albert Buck Wharton. It was designed by Sanguinet & Staats in the Georgian Revival architectural style. The house is two and a half stories with a gambrel roof. Projecting bays on each side of the home use semi-circular elements. The brick house is trimmed in cast stone and the sloped roof is green tile. The interior features a grand staircase and elaborate woodwork. The grounds are fenced with brick walls and ornamental iron. A carriage house is located on the rear of the property.

In 1911, local businessman and cattle baron Winfield Scott purchased the house from the Whartons. Scott renovated the home and the grounds at the time.

In 1940, the mansion was acquired by the Girls Service League of Fort Worth. The house was then empty from 1968 to 1975. A year later, in 1976, a preservation non-profit organization called Save-the-Scott purchased the house and restored it.

On January 1, 2006, Historic Fort Worth, Inc. took possession of the house and has devoted time and resources toward further restoration. The home continues to be rented for weddings and receptions.

== Heritage significance ==
It has been listed on the National Register of Historic Places since April 14, 1975.

== See also ==
- National Register of Historic Places listings in Tarrant County, Texas
- Recorded Texas Historic Landmarks in Tarrant County

== Bibliography ==
- Roze McCoy Porter, Thistle Hill (Fort Worth: Branch-Smith, 1980).
- Judy Alter, Thistle Hill: The History and the House (Fort Worth: Texas Christian University Press, 1988).
