= Arlington Downs =

Former horse racing track in Texas

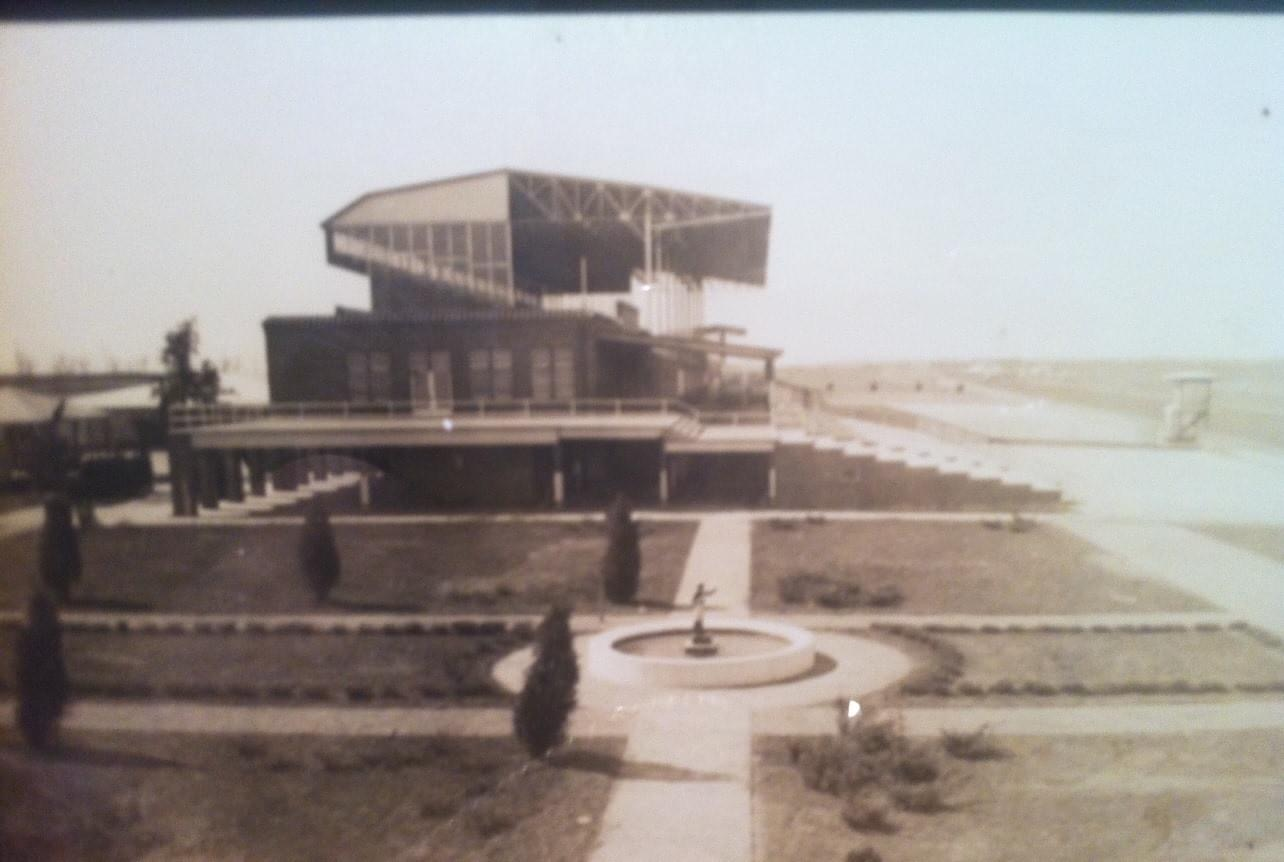
Arlington Downs racetrack

Arlington Downs was an American horse-racing track located in Arlington, Texas in Tarrant County, about 20 miles (32 km) from downtown Fort Worth, Texas. The $3 million facility, a 1¼-mile track with a 6,000-seat grandstand, was constructed on W.T. Waggoner's Three D's Stock Farm, and opened in November 1929.

== History ==
W.T. Waggoner built the track, grandstand and stables for prize-winning horse races before parimutuel betting was legalized in Texas. They also held Quarter Horse shows, rodeos and various civic events on the same property. W.T. and his sons Guy (1883–1950) and E. Paul (1889–1967) campaigned in support of parimutuel betting which helped get the bill passed in the Texas state legislature. E. Paul visited some of the larger race tracks to see how they were built and to learn how the races were conducted. By the second racing season, the track was expanded and included additional amenities, and a large training stable that was built atop the hill overlooking the racetrack. Waggoner lived to see the early success of Arlington Downs, and died in 1934.

When two racegoers, O. O. Franklin and J. B. Coulter, were arrested at Arlington Downs in the fall of 1931 for openly betting on the races, the resulting publicity and court case allowed racing proponents to make their case public. In 1933, the Texas legislature legalized parimutuel betting and issued the first permit to Arlington Downs.

The racetrack thrived as Thoroughbred owners from across the country sent their horses to compete at Arlington Downs. During its first year of full operation with legal wagering, 650 horses ran on the track, profits averaged $113,731 a day, and the average daily attendance was 6,734. Waggoner died of stroke on December 11, 1934, and the racing industry lost one of its most fervent boosters. At the end of the 1937 regular session, the state legislature repealed the parimutuel laws and Arlington Downs was sold to commercial developers. The racetrack was used for rodeos and other events until 1958, when the buildings were razed.

In 1978, a Texas historical landmark was placed on the site.

== See also ==
- Top O' Hill Terrace
