= Stacia Haynie =

American political scientist

- Born: April 6, 1959 (age 67); Texas, USA

Academic background
- Education: BA, theater, 1981, MA, political science, 1986, Midwestern State University; PhD, political science, 1990, University of North Texas
- Thesis: A time series analysis of the functional performance of the United States Supreme Court (1990)

Academic work
- Institutions: Louisiana State University

Stacia L. Haynie (born April 6, 1959) is an American political scientist. In 2018, Haynie was appointed Louisiana State University's executive vice president and provost.

== Early life and education ==
Haynie was born on April 6, 1959 and grew up on her grandfather's Texas cotton farm. She received a bachelor's degree in theater in 1981 and a master's degree in political science in 1986 from Midwestern State University. In 1990, she received her Ph.D. in political science from the University of North Texas. Due to her parents financial situation, she was only able to enroll in post-secondary education due academic and private donar scholarships.

== Career ==
Upon completing her formal education, Haynie accepted a political science faculty position at Louisiana State University (LSU) in 1990. She was appointed to the interim dean of the Graduate School but assumed the position as vice provost of the Office of Academic Affairs in February 2008. Haynie returned to teaching in January 2011 to teach introduction to American government and judicial process courses. She returned to an administrator role in 2014 after she was selected to replace Gaines Foster as dean of LSU's College of Humanities and Social Sciences. In 2018, Haynie was appointed LSU's executive vice president and provost.

During the COVID-19 pandemic, Haynie was ranked by the Business Report as an Influential Women in Business.

On June 20, 2023, Haynie was announced as the sole finalist for president of Midwestern State University.

== Personal life ==
Haynie is married.

== Selected publications ==
- Judging in Black and White: Decision Making in the South African Appellate Division, 1950-1990. (2003)
