= Top O' Hill Terrace =

- Location: 3001 W Division, Arlington, Texas, United States
- Built: c. 1921
- Owner: Arlington Baptist University

Recorded Texas Historic Landmark
- Designated: 2003
- Reference no.: 13170

The Top O' Hill Terrace was a restaurant, illegal casino, and speakeasy in Arlington, Texas. It was first established as a tea room in the early 1920s before being sold to Fred Browning, who renovated it to provide illegal gambling and prostitution to visitors from the nearby Arlington Downs race track. It operated as a speakeasy during Prohibition, catering to the rich and famous. After repeated raids from the Texas Rangers, the establishment shut down in the early 1950s. The property is now the campus of Arlington Baptist University.

== History ==
=== Tea room ===
The establishment was founded by Beulah and Thomas Marshall as a tea room by 1921, in what had been a large house. It was located on the Bankhead Highway and was easy to reach from nearby Dallas and Fort Worth, Texas. The house was made of woodbine sandstone and had a panoramic view of Fort Worth's skyline. It became a popular destination for tea parties, bridal showers, and luncheons, and was famous for its chicken-fried steak.

=== Transformation into a casino ===
In 1930, the Marshalls sold the establishment to Fred and Mary Browning. They converted the tea room into a night club to attract visitors from the Arlington Downs racing track. Fred Browning had experience running illegal gambling establishments, having run the Loma Linda club in Richmond, Texas and the Beau Monde club in Tulsa, Oklahoma. The Top O' Hill Terrace was adapted to include gambling facilities and a brothel. During Prohibition, alcohol was also illegally served at the club. The house continued to operate as a restaurant, while illegal activity took place underground.

Browning had the house lifted from its foundations so that a secret casino could be built underneath, with roulette wheels, rosewood billiard tables and an oak bartop. The establishment was designed to be luxurious, with crystal chandeliers, Irish linen, fine china tableware, and crystal drinkware. Visitors were not permitted to bring guns into the casino, and had to pass through a series of doors with peepholes and two-way mirrors. Browning also built a secret room with two-way mirrors that allowed him to observe gambling patrons.

An iron gate was built to protect the property's 900-foot (270 m) driveway, and the premises was surrounded by a sandstone wall with watchtowers manned by armed guards. The guards alerted patrons if police were approaching so that they could hide evidence of gambling and drinking. A system of tunnels were dug under the property so that patrons could go to the tea garden or flee into the woods outside the property during a police raid. The gaming tables were designed so that they could be flipped upside down to appear like dining tables.

The Top O' Hill Terrace became successful and often handled $500,000 worth of business each weekend. It was nicknamed "the Devil's Playground" and later became known as "the Vegas before Vegas". At one point, Browning partnered with casino operator Benny Binion to run the casino. The casino entertained celebrities like Gene Autry, Mae West, John Wayne, Dean Martin, Frank Sinatra, Howard Hughes, and Sally Rand. Criminals Bonnie and Clyde gambled at the Top O' Hill but were required to leave their guns in their car.

Browning also built stables for breeding thoroughbred racehorses, including a private stable for his stud Royal Ford, which he bought from William Thomas Waggoner.

=== Raids and legal trouble ===
On November 5, 1935, Texas Ranger Captain Tom Hickman attempted to raid the establishment, but found no evidence of wrongdoing because the management had been warned in advance. On November 6, 1935, Rangers J. W. McCormick and Sid Kelso successfully raided the casino. Browning and four of his associates were arrested, but the patrons were allowed to leave. Hickman was eventually fired for his failure at the terrace. Browning and his associates were quickly released and were allowed to take back the gambling equipment that had been confiscated.

Captain Manuel T. Gonzaullas was sent to raid the establishment on August 10, 1947. Instead of approaching the casino from its long front driveway, as previous raids had done, Gonzaullas' men crawled up the hillside behind the property which was covered with barbed wire. They entered a back door once it was opened for a patron and ambushed everyone inside the casino.

Although Browning was arrested several times during these raids, the Rangers were unable to successfully charge him with any crimes until 1950, when he was indicted on gambling-related charges. He was indicted again in 1951. The casino continued to operate until Browning died on October 30, 1953, although the threat of raids had made it less popular.

=== Arlington Baptist University ===
In 1956, the property was bought by the Baptist Bible Seminary. The seminary had been founded as the Baptist Bible Institute by J. Frank Norris, pastor of the First Baptist Church of Fort Worth. Norris, who had died in 1952, was a prominent critic of gambling and alcohol, who reportedly vowed to own the Top O' Hill Terrace one day.

The seminary eventually became Arlington Baptist University. The university destroyed many of the former buildings, including the house, the underground casino, and the restaurant kitchen. The guardhouse and iron gate is still in use as the historic gateway. The swimming pool and tea garden are still standing, although the tea garden has since fallen into disrepair due to weather and lack of maintenance. The university campus has a small museum containing items from the casino, including a roulette wheel, liquor bottles, and poker chips.

The University of Texas at Arlington and the City of Arlington partnered with Arlington Baptist University to produce an archival history of the terrace.
