= Catlett Creek =

Creek in Wise County, Texas, US

Coordinates: 33°14′20″N 97°26′22″W

Catlett Creek is a creek in Wise County, Texas.

== Location ==
The creek is located in Wise County, in central Texas. Its source is five miles north of Decatur, and it runs for twelve miles until it reaches Sweetwater Creek near Bluett.

== History ==
In the 1840s and 1850s, it was the site of skirmishes between Native Americans and European settlers. The creek was also where Daniel Waggoner first settled in Wise County in the 1850s, later to establish his Waggoner Ranch.

== See also ==
- List of rivers of Texas
