= China Creek (Wilbarger County, Texas) =

Coordinates: 34.1473°N 98.8235°W

China Creek is a creek in Wilbarger County, Texas.

== Location ==
The creek runs from Harrold for twelve miles, all the way down to the Red River.

== History ==
The creek was first known as "Moore's Creek" by an employee of the Memphis, El Paso and Pacific Railroad. It was renamed "China Creek" for the chinaberry that grew on its banks. It was also described by early Texas settler Richard Boren.

By 1879, the creek was flowing through the Waggoner Ranch established by Daniel Waggoner. This section was managed by his son, William Thomas Waggoner. W.T. Waggoner sold this section of their ranch to developers in 1903.

== See also ==
- China Creek (San Saba County, Texas).
- List of rivers of Texas
