= E. Paul Waggoner =

American rancher (1889–1967)

- Born: Edward Paul Waggoner; April 9, 1889; Decatur, Texas, U.S.
- Died: March 3, 1967 (aged 77)
- Resting place: Sherman, Texas, U.S.
- Occupations: Rancher, horsebreeder
- Spouse: Helen Buck
- Children: Electra Waggoner Biggs
- Parent(s): William Thomas Waggoner; Ella (Halsell) Waggoner
- Relatives: Electra Waggoner (sister); Guy Waggoner (brother)

Edward Paul Waggoner (April 9, 1889 – March 3, 1967), born in Decatur, Texas, was an American rancher, and one of the three original heirs to the W.T. Waggoner Estate in North Texas. After forming the estate, Tom Waggoner appointed his three children, E. Paul, Guy and Electra, to the board of directors. He was inducted into the American Quarter Horse Hall of Fame posthumously, in 1991.

== Early life ==
Edward Paul Waggoner, best known as E. Paul, was born in 1889 to Ella (Halsell) and William Thomas Waggoner. Tom Waggoner was an infant when his father Daniel Waggoner acquired land south of the Red River near Vernon, Texas and started a ranch with a few hundred head of longhorn cattle and some horses. At the time, the Red River separated Texas from what was known as Indian Territory; it was an area where the Comanche and Kiowa made frequent raids. Tom was instrumental in expanding their land holdings into what became the sprawling Waggoner Ranch, the largest ranch under one fence in the United States. E. Paul had two siblings, a brother Guy Waggoner and sister Electra Waggoner. They were raised in the Waggoner Mansion (a.k.a. 'El Castile') in Decatur, Texas but also spent time on the Waggoner Ranch which was headquartered near Vernon, Texas. Their horse program headquarters was referred to as Whiteface.

== Career ==
Waggoner inherited one-fourth of the Waggoner Ranch, known as the 'Santa Rosa' subsection, where he bred Quarter Horses. An extension of his ranch holdings included 3D Stock Farm which was also home to Arlington Downs, a multimillion-dollar racetrack facility his father had built, gambling that parimutuel betting would be legalized in Texas; the latter of which did occur in 1933 but the law was repealed in 1937, and wasn't legalized again in Texas until 1987.

E. Paul purchased Poco Bueno as a long yearling in 1945 from Jess Hankins at the Hankins Auction Sale in San Angelo, Texas for US$5,700. The sire went on to win many halter and cutting competitions. Poco Bueno sired Poco Lena, Poco Stampede, Poco Mona and Poco Pine, won many equine competitions in the United States. Other national champions bred by Waggoner were Jessie James and Pep Up.

Waggoner was the owner of the rodeo grounds in Vernon. In 1946, he led the first rodeo parade in the town.

== Personal life ==
Waggoner married Helen Buck, and had a daughter, Electra Waggoner Biggs, who became a sculptor.

== Death and legacy ==
Waggoner died in 1967. He was inducted into the American Quarter Horse Hall of Fame posthumously, in 1991.
