= Midwestern State University =

Public university in Wichita Falls, Texas, US

- Former names: Wichita Falls Junior College (1922–1937); Hardin Junior College (1937–1946); Hardin College (1946–1950); Midwestern University (1950–1975)
- Motto: Per Scientam ad Excellentiam
- Motto in English: Through Knowledge to Excellence
- Type: Public liberal arts university
- Established: 1922; 104 years ago
- Parent institution: Texas Tech University System
- Academic affiliations: Council of Public Liberal Arts Colleges
- Endowment: $100 million (FY2025) (MSU only) $3.35 billion (FY2025) (system-wide)
- Budget: $132 million (FY2026)
- Chancellor: Brandon Creighton
- President: Stacia Haynie
- Provost: Margaret Brown Marsden
- Students: 5,287 (fall 2025)
- Undergraduates: 4,379 (fall 2025)
- Postgraduates: 908 (fall 2025)
- Location: Wichita Falls, Texas, U.S. 33°52′26″N 98°31′16″W
- Campus: 255 acres (103 ha); Midsize city
- Colors: Maroon and gold
- Nickname: Mustangs
- Sporting affiliations: NCAA Division II – Lone Star
- Mascot: Maverick T. Mustang
- Website: msutexas.edu
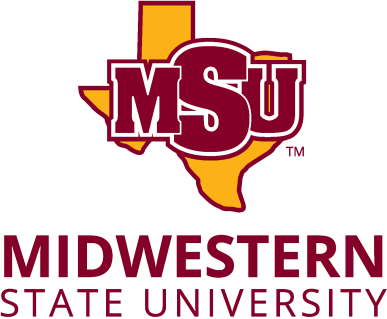

Midwestern State University (MSU Texas) is a public liberal arts university in Wichita Falls, Texas. As of fall 2025, MSU Texas enrolled 5,287 students. It is the state's only public institution focused on the liberal arts.

== History ==
Founded in 1922 as the municipally owned Wichita Falls Junior College, it was renamed Hardin Junior College in 1937 when it moved from Wichita Falls High School to its present location off Taft Boulevard. In 1946, a senior division was added and it was renamed Hardin College. In January 1950, the name changed to Midwestern University, with the junior college division remaining Hardin Junior College. In March 1948, the university became a member of the Association of Colleges and Secondary Schools. In January 1959, the university added a graduate school which received full approval from the State Board of Education in August of that year.

A further change in the school's status came September 1, 1961, when by action of the 56th session of the Texas State Legislature, Midwestern University was transferred from the city of Wichita Falls to the Texas Colleges and Universities System and the junior college division was dissolved. In 1975, the Texas Legislature changed the name to Midwestern State University.

From its beginnings as a municipal junior college housed in a high school building, Midwestern has become a state university whose campus of 255 acres and 70 buildings offers a wide variety of academic programs in liberal and fine arts, mathematics, sciences, business, and applied sciences.

On March 9, 2015, the university announced that Suzanne Shipley was selected to become its next president, following Jesse Rogers' retirement after 48 years of service to the school.

On December 13, 2016, the university broke ground on a new campus in Flower Mound, Texas. The two-story facility shares space with North Central Texas College and opened in June 2018.

Since 2018, several incidents of racially motivated vandalism and harassment have been reported at Midwestern State University. The university administration has been repeatedly criticized by students of color for its handling of such incidents, as well as for its perceived indifference to issues facing racial minorities more generally. In 2018, the university faced widespread criticism from students in response to the administration's perceived indifference to sexual harassment and violence on campus. A university administrator reportedly made a rape joke at a campus forum intended to discuss the issue.

The Robert and Carol Gunn College of Health Sciences and Human Services officially opened up their new building, Centennial Hall, on September 6, 2019.

In 2019, a Midwestern State University graduate student was publicly outed as a white supremacist. The university was roundly criticized for its handling of the ensuing controversy. The following year, the university was widely and publicly criticized for its response to a right-wing harassment campaign that had been directed against former philosophy professor Nathan Jun in response to controversial Facebook posts. The following year the university was again criticized for allegedly forcing Jun to resign his tenured position by denying him a requested disability accommodation. The allegation prompted an open letter of protest that was eventually signed by more than 500 faculty members.

On August 6, 2020, the Texas Tech University System and Midwestern State University agreed to a memorandum of understanding to begin the process of MSU Texas becoming the fifth university to join the system. The process was completed on September 1, 2021, when HB 1522 went into effect.

== Academics ==
Academic rankings

Master's
- Washington Monthly: 235

Regional
- U.S. News & World Report: 75

Midwestern State University is organized into seven colleges with 16 undergraduate programs offering 43 majors and 30 minors, and 9 graduate programs offering 28 majors and 15 minors.

MSU is the only university in Texas with membership in the Council of Public Liberal Arts Colleges and was the first public university in Texas to establish a core curriculum. The university is also a member of the Association of American Colleges and Universities and the Association for Core Texts and Courses.

=== Dalquest Desert Research Station ===
The Dalquest Desert Research Station is located on 3,000 acres of West Texas soil north of the Big Bend Ranch State Park. The land was a gift from Walter W. Dalquest, a professor at MSU, and his wife, Rose, on the condition that it be used for scientific research by biologists and geologists. Today, the site is used by professors, students, naturalists, scientists, and educators.

== Athletics ==
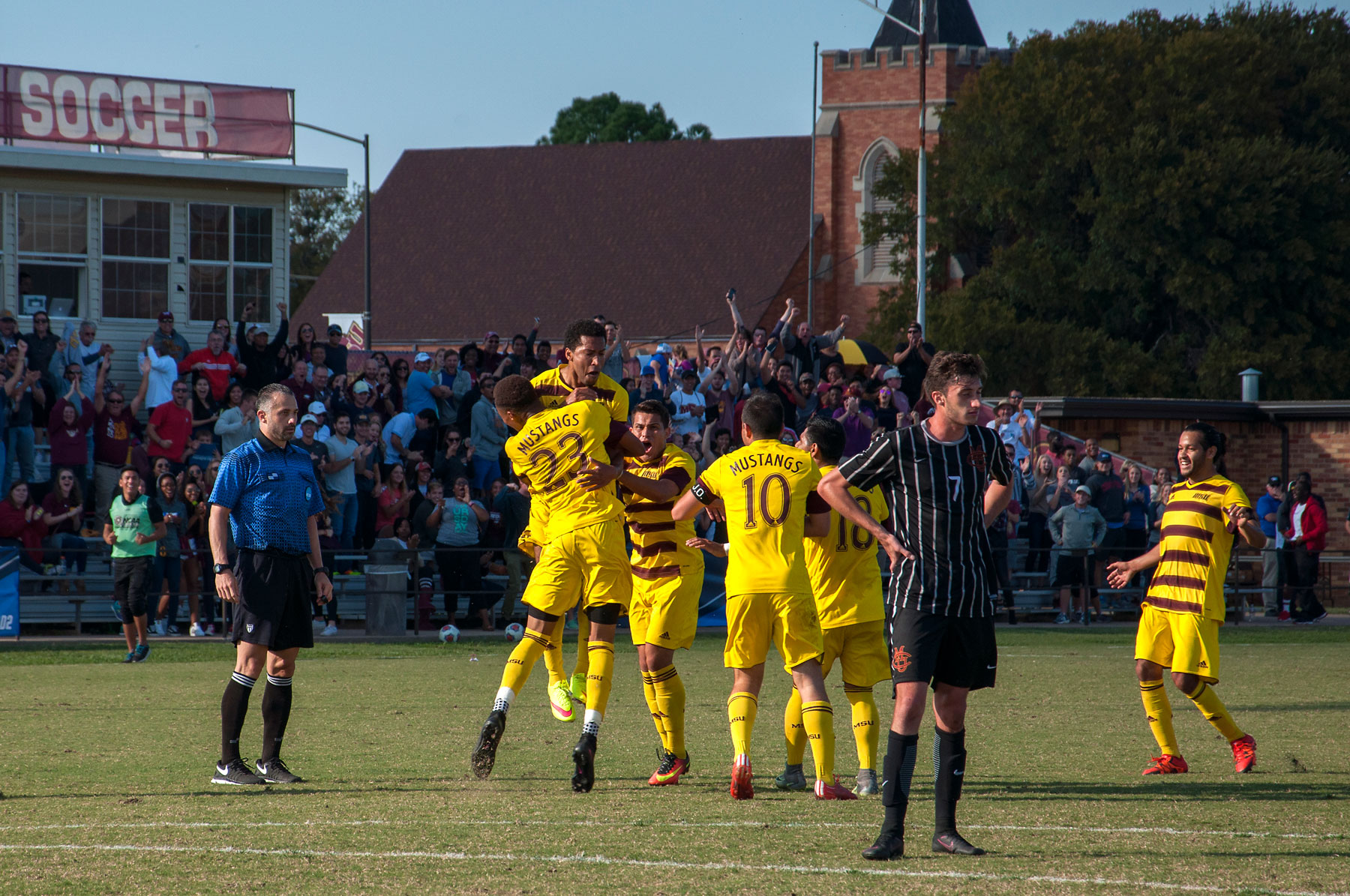
MSU celebrate after scoring a late-goal during the 2016 soccer playoffs.

Midwestern State fields 13 intercollegiate NCAA Division II athletic teams. MSU is a member of the Lone Star Conference (LSC). The school mascot is the mustang.

The basketball and volleyball teams play at D.L. Ligon Coliseum. The football team plays at Memorial Stadium (Wichita Falls). The soccer teams play at the MSU Soccer Field. The softball team plays at Mustangs Park. The tennis teams play at the MSU Tennis Center.

== Student life ==
Undergraduate demographics as of Fall 2023
Race and ethnicity	Total
White	43%
Hispanic	26%
Black	16%
International student	4%
Two or more races	4%
Asian	3%
Unknown	2%
American Indian/Alaska Native	1%
Economic diversity
Low-income (Note: The percentage of students who received an income-based federal Pell grant intended for low-income students.)	43%
Affluent (Note: The percentage of students who are a part of the American middle class at the bare minimum.)	57%

The university's campus covers 255 acres (1.0 km^{2}) with over 50 buildings uniformly built of red brick with tiled roofs and arched facades.

Students can be members of 14 nationally affiliated fraternities and sororities and more than 100 other student organizations including sports clubs. The campus also has a newspaper, The Wichitan, and a student-run television channel and production studio, M&G Media. The campus newspaper and production studio are housed in the Mass Communication wing of the Fain Fine Arts Center.

=== Housing and dining services ===
Midwestern State has four residence halls; Legacy Hall, McCullough-Trigg Hall, Killingsworth Hall, and Pierce Hall (the latter of which is currently vacated for construction). It also has two apartments; Sundance Courts and Sunwatcher Village.

Dining services went through a major remodel in 2016, adding new storefronts. Dining halls include the Mesquite Dining Hall and Maverick's Corner. New storefronts in the Clark Student Center include Chick-fil-A and ACE Sushi. Einstein Bros. Bagels is located in the Dillard College of Business Administration. A cafe called Campus Coffee was opened at the Bridwell Activities Center (built in 2021 and completed in 2022) in 2022.

== Notable alumni ==
=== Arts and entertainment ===
- Phil McGraw — Dr. Phil, television host
- Jaret Reddick — original founder and lead vocalist/guitarist of the popular punk band Bowling for Soup
- JoAnne Worley — Laugh In and many other TV comedy shows

=== Athletics ===
- Marqui Christian — professional football player
- Eric Dawson — professional basketball player
- Chad DeGrenier — professional football player and coach
- Cotton Fitzsimmons — college and professional basketball coach
- Jinh Yu Frey — professional mixed martial artist
- Bryan Gilmore — professional football player
- Andrea Hannos — professional cyclist
- Dudley Meredith — professional football player
- Tony Pesznecker — professional soccer player
- Will Pettis — professional football player
- Dominic Rhodes — professional football player
- Amini Silatolu — professional football player
- Chad Smith — professional soccer player
- Ray Gene Smith — professional football player
- Gary Suiter — professional basketball player
- Craig Sutherland — professional soccer player
- Andy Tanner — professional football player
- Bryce Taylor — professional soccer player
- J. J. Unga — professional football player
- Randy Waldrum — professional soccer coach
- Daniel Woolard — professional soccer player

=== Business and nonprofit ===
- Albert Buckman Wharton III — former owner of the Waggoner Ranch

=== Government ===
- Mark Boulware — U.S. ambassador to Mauritania (2007–2010)
- Walter Wilson Jenkins — political figure and longtime top aide to U.S. President Lyndon B. Johnson
- Andy King — council member for the 12th District of the New York City Council (2012–present)
- Dan Kubiak — state representative from Rockdale (1969–1983 and 1991–1998)
- Lanham Lyne — mayor of Wichita Falls, Texas, 2005–2010; state representative, District 69 (2011-2013)
- Mutryce Williams, Kittian ambassador

=== Journalism and literature ===
- Beck Weathers — motivational speaker and a mountain climber involved in the 1996 Everest disaster
- John Edwards Williams — writer

=== Religion ===
- Stephen McNallen — American proponent of Heathenry, a modern Pagan new religious movement, and a white nationalist activist

=== Science and education ===
- Michael Obeng — celebrity plastic surgeon in Beverly Hills, CA
- Mark Rippetoe — author, strength-training coach

== Notable faculty, lecturers, and staff ==
- Larry McMurtry — novelist
- John Tower — United States senator

== Gallery ==
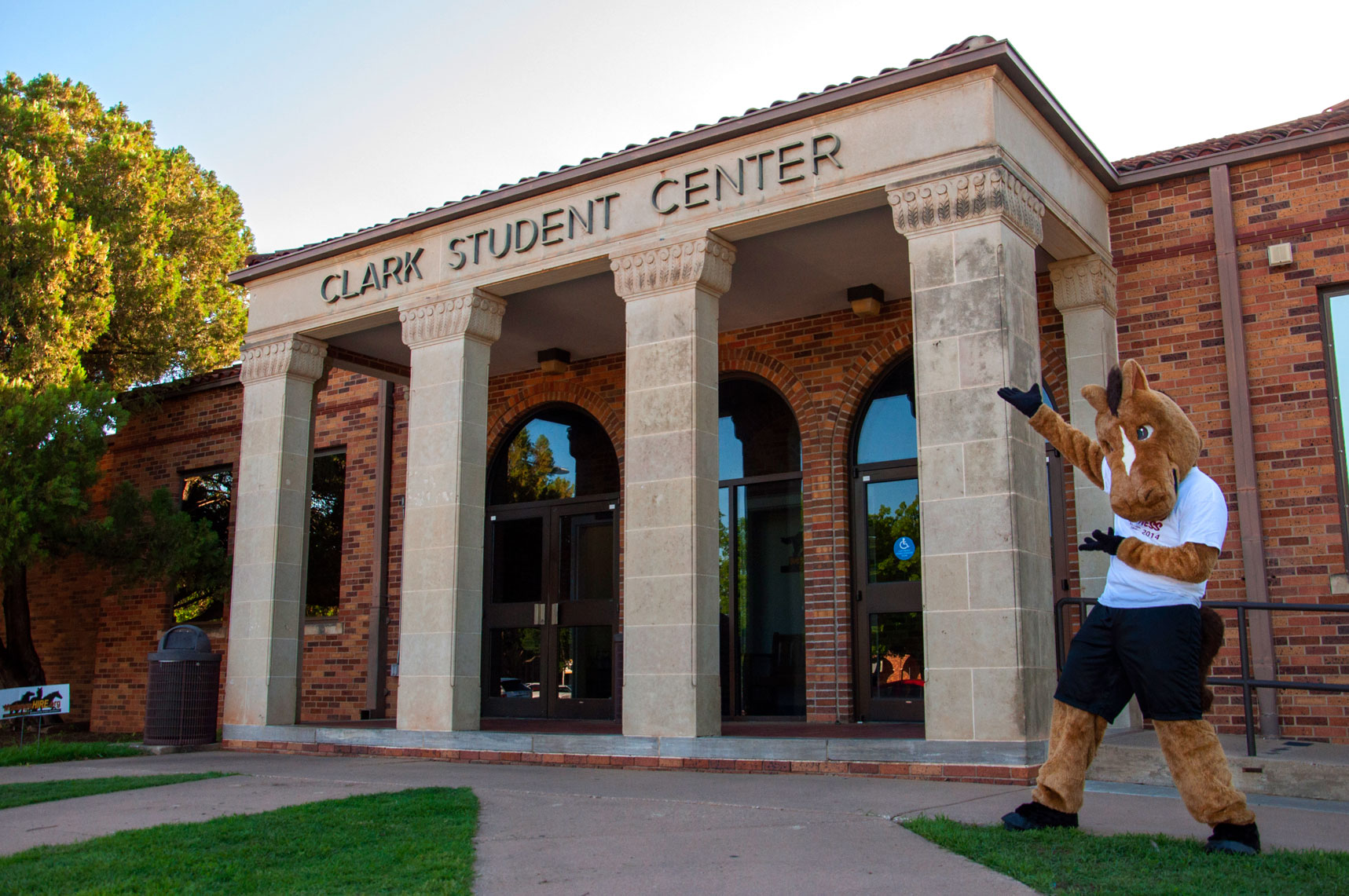
Clark Student Center

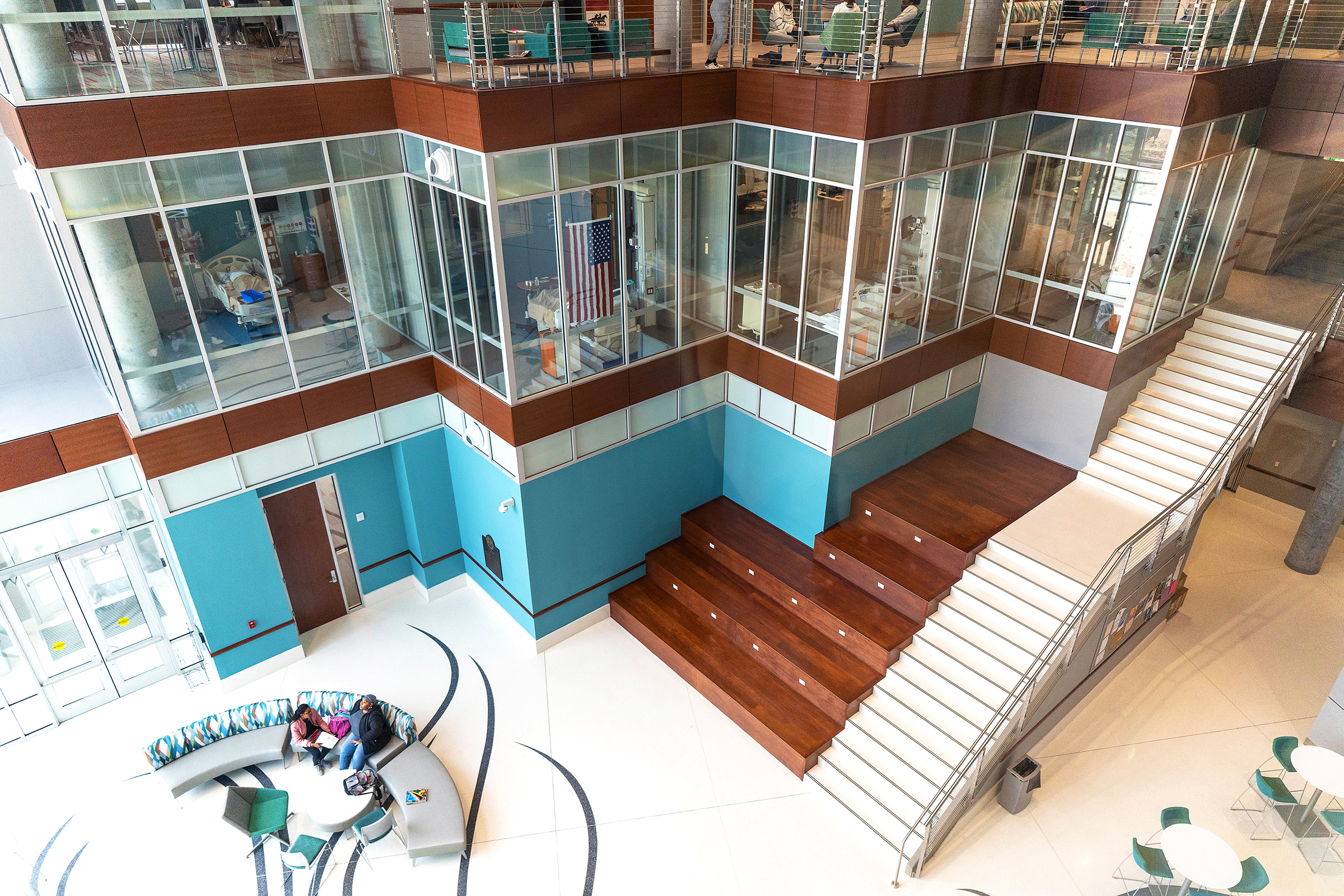
Inside look of the new Health Sciences and Human Services building

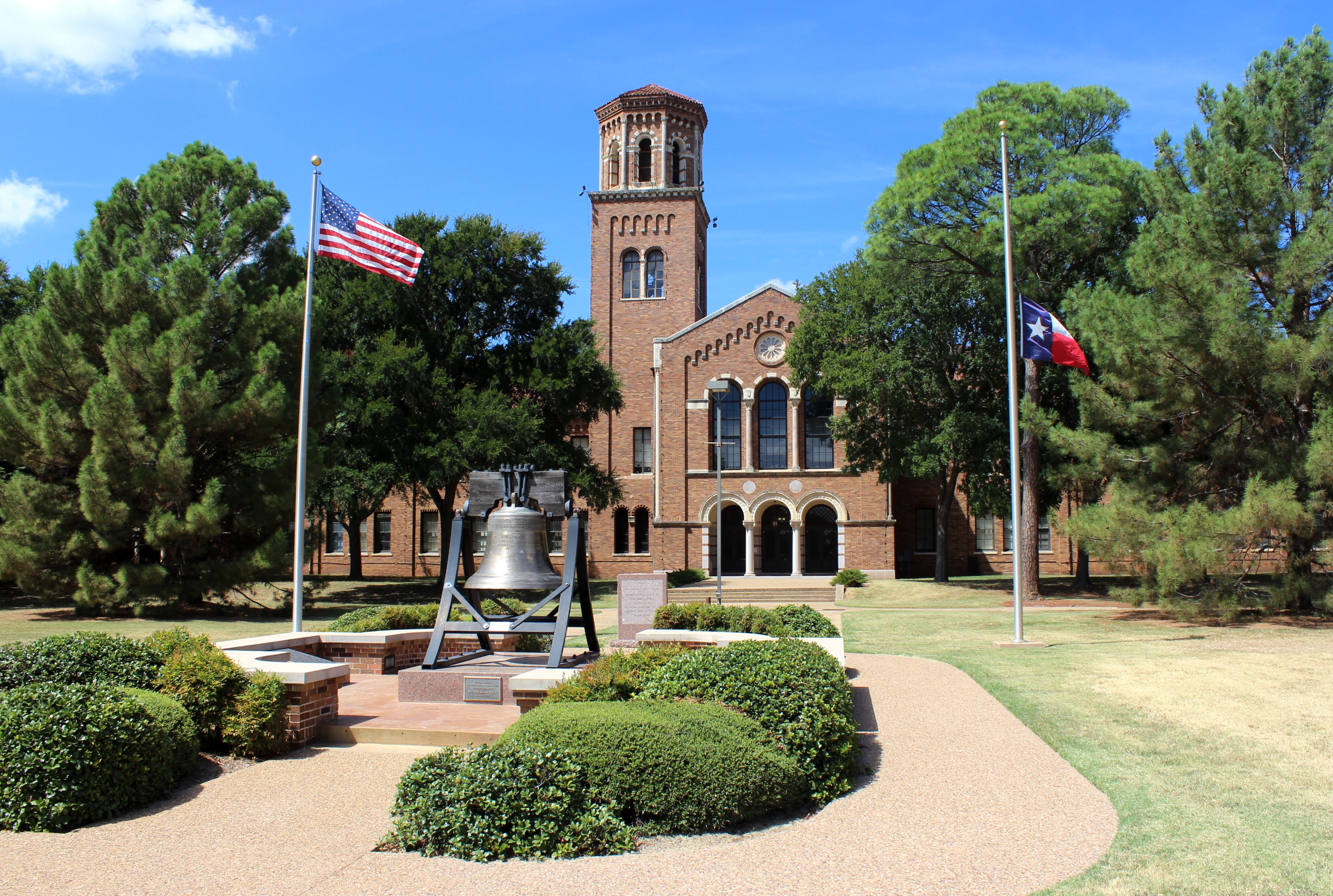
Hardin Administration Building

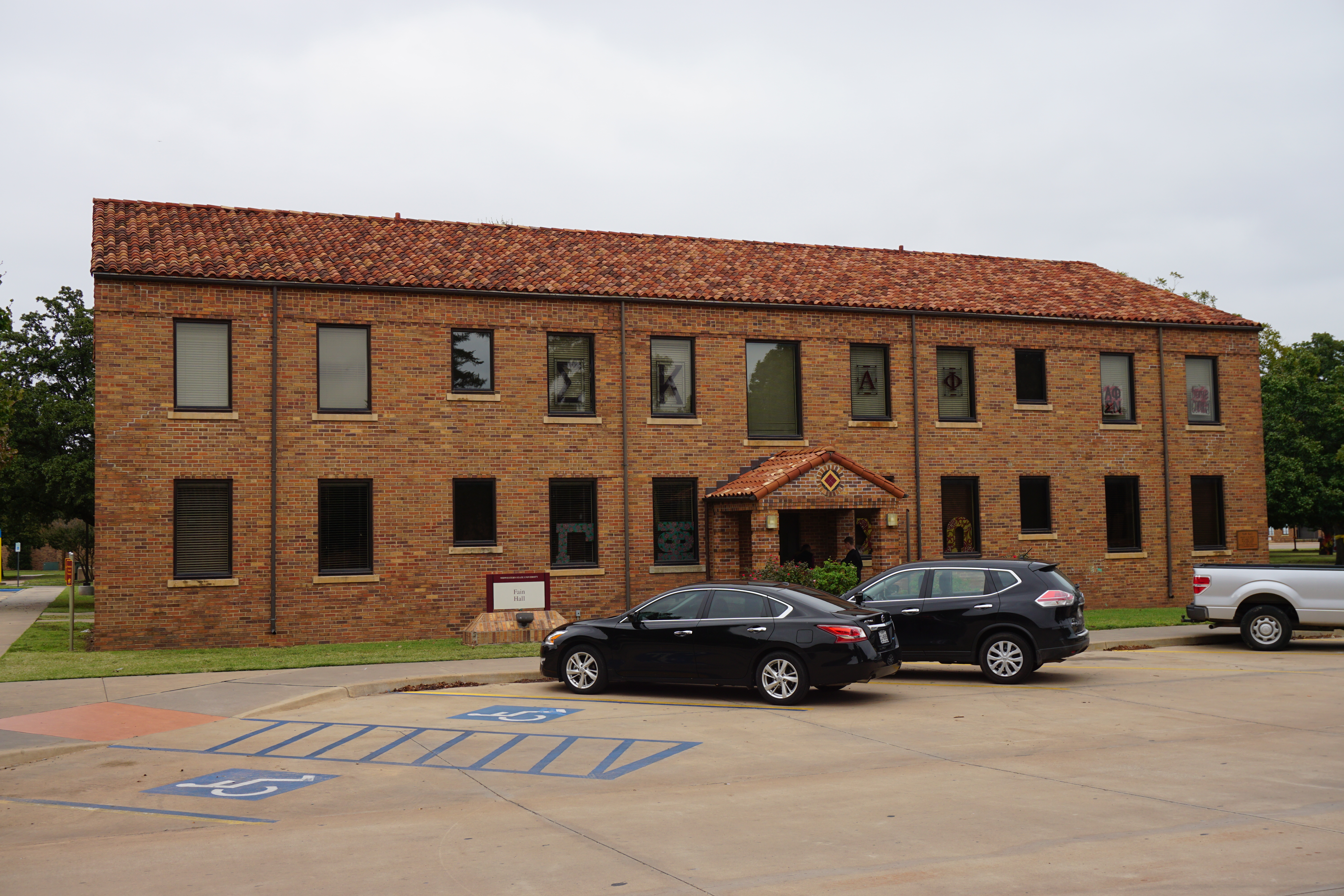
Fain Hall

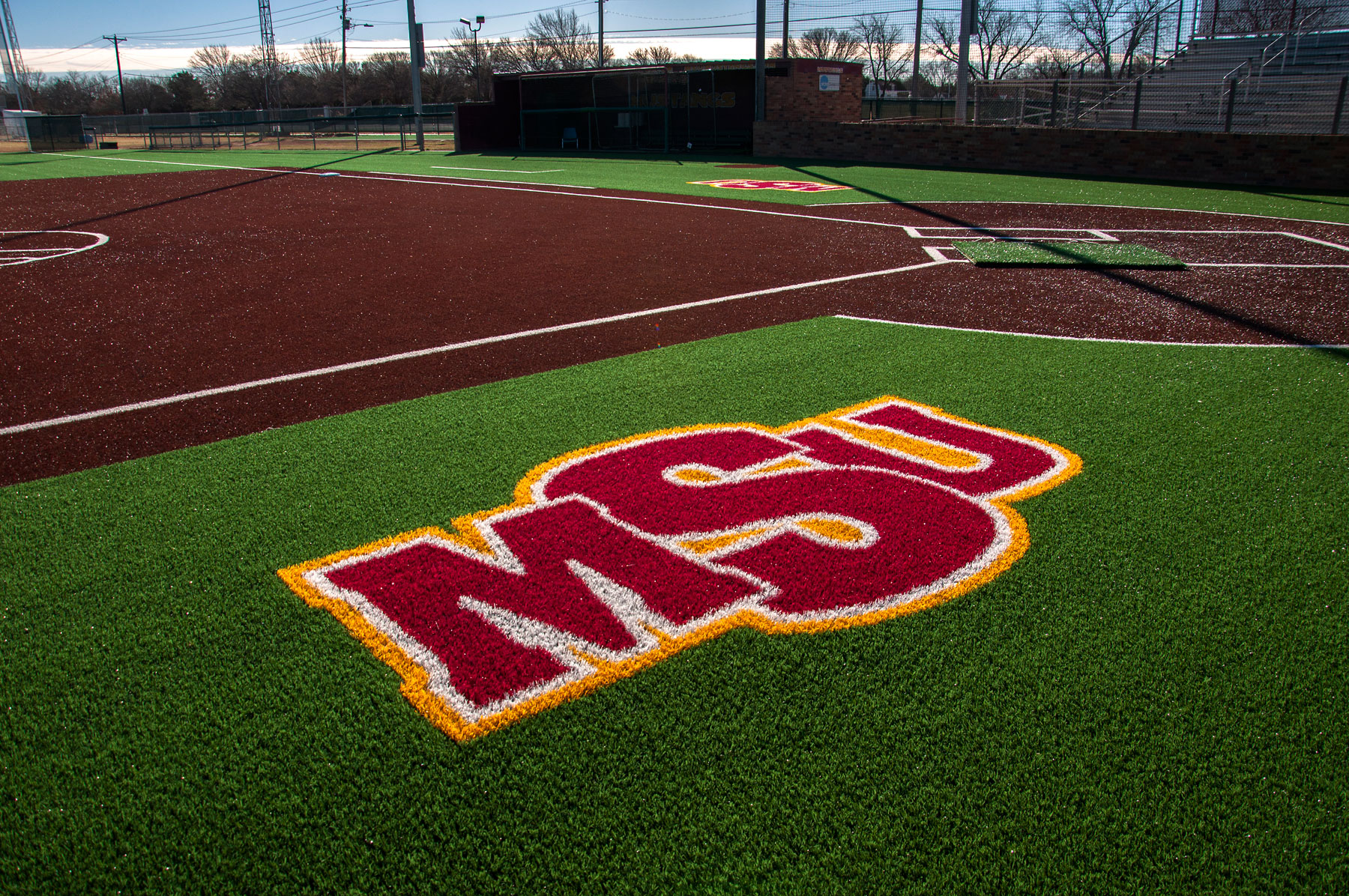
Mustangs Park
