= Electra Waggoner =

American rancher and socialite

- Born: January 6, 1882 near Decatur, Texas, U.S.
- Died: November 26, 1925 (aged 43)
- Occupations: Rancher, socialite
- Spouses: Albert Buckman Wharton; Weldon Bailey; James A. Gilmore
- Children: Tom Waggoner Wharton; Albert Buckman Wharton, Jr.
- Parent: William Thomas Waggoner
- Relatives: Guy Waggoner (brother); E. Paul Waggoner (brother); Albert Buckman Wharton III (grandson)

Electra Waggoner (January 6, 1882 – November 26, 1925) was an American rancher and socialite from Texas. She was an heiress to the Waggoner Ranch, one of the largest ranches in the United States. The town of Electra, Texas, was named in her honor.

== Early life ==
Electra Waggoner was born on January 6, 1882, near Decatur, Texas. Her father, William Thomas Waggoner, was the owner of the Waggoner Ranch in Texas. Her mother was Ella (Halsell) Waggoner. She had two brothers, Guy Waggoner and E. Paul Waggoner. They grew up at the Waggoner Mansion (a.k.a. 'El Castile') in Decatur as well as on the Waggoner Ranch.

== Zacaweista ==
Waggoner inherited one fourth of the Waggoner Ranch known as the 'Zacaweista' subsection. The Native American word means 'good grass.' In 1910, she built a mansion on the ranch, also named Zacaweista.

== Personal life ==
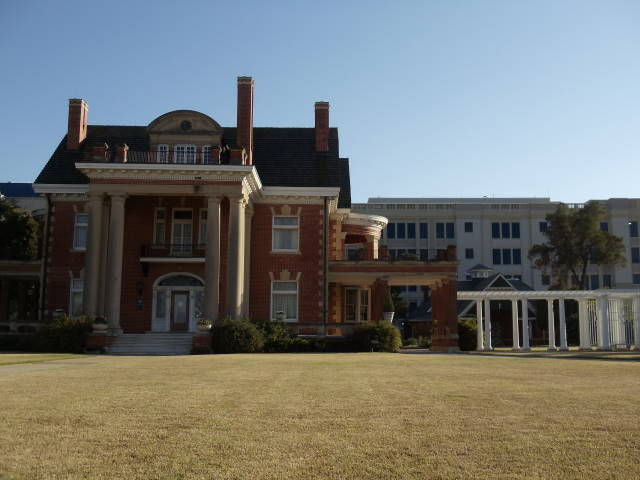
Thistle Hill in Fort Worth, Texas.

Waggoner was married three times. Her first husband was Albert Buckman Wharton of the Wharton family of Philadelphia, Pennsylvania. They had met while she was traveling in the Himalayas. They wed on June 10, 1902. They resided at Thistle Hill, also known as the Wharton-Scott House, a mansion in Fort Worth now listed on the National Register of Historic Places. The couple divorced after nineteen years of marriage. During their marriage, they had two sons:

- Tom Waggoner Wharton, who married eight times and died of syphilis at the age of twenty-five.
- Albert Buckman Wharton, Jr., who was a polo player who married four times and had one son, A.B. Wharton III, a.k.a. Bucky Wharton. He died of cirrhosis of the liver in 1963.

She was the aunt of sculptor Electra Waggoner Biggs.

Waggoner then moved to a mansion called Shadowlawn on Preston Road in Highland Park, a wealthy enclave of Dallas, Texas. She was married two more times, to Weldon Bailey, the son of Joseph Weldon Bailey, and then to James A. Gilmore.

== Death and legacy ==
Waggoner died on November 26, 1925, at the age of forty-three. The town of Electra, Texas, was named in her honor. Her niece Electra Waggoner Biggs was named after her.
