= Albert Buckman Wharton III =

American rancher

- Born: 1948 (age 77–78)
- Education: Culver Military Academy
- Alma mater: Midwestern State University
- Occupation: Rancher
- Spouse: Joline Wharton
- Children: 2
- Parent: Albert Buckman Wharton Jr.
- Relatives: Daniel Waggoner (paternal great-great-grandfather); William Thomas Waggoner (paternal great-grandfather); Electra Waggoner (paternal grandmother)

Albert Buckman Wharton III (a.k.a. Bucky Wharton) is an American rancher.

== Early life ==
Albert Buckman Wharton III grew up in Albuquerque, New Mexico. He is the son of Albert Buckman Wharton Jr., a.k.a. Buster Wharton, an heir to the Waggoner Ranch and polo player. His mother was Buster Wharton's third wife. His paternal grandmother was Electra Waggoner and his paternal grandfather, Albert Buckman Wharton. His paternal great-grandfather was William Thomas Waggoner and his paternal great-great-grandfather, Daniel Waggoner.

Wharton was educated at the Culver Military Academy in Indiana. His father died when he was fifteen years old. He attended the University of the Americas in Mexico City, Mexico. He then served at Fort Bragg in North Carolina during the Vietnam War. When he was discharged in 1970, he enrolled at Midwestern State University in Wichita Falls, Texas, where he went on to receive a Bachelor in Business Administration (B.B.A.).

== Career ==
Wharton inherited half the Waggoner Ranch in 1970, after his mother sued the estate for four years. Indeed, his father had originally left his estate to his widow instead of him, an outcome his mother wouldn't accept.

After multiple lawsuits, the ranch is listed for sale on the real estate market.

== Personal life ==
Wharton is married to Joline Wharton. They have two children. They reside on the Waggoner Ranch.
