= Electra, Texas =

- City
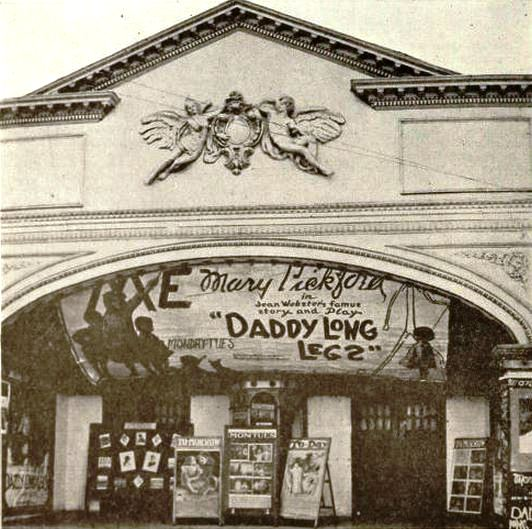
- Liberty Theater, Electra, showing a Mary Pickford movie in 1919.
- Motto: "Wichita County's Best Kept Secret"
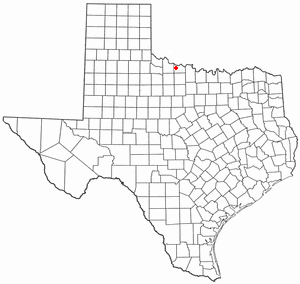
- Location of Electra, Texas

- Coordinates: 34°01′57″N 98°55′12″W
- Country: United States
- State: Texas
- County: Wichita

Area
  - Total: 3.08 sq mi (7.98 km^{2})
  - Land: 3.08 sq mi (7.97 km^{2})
  - Water: 0.0039 sq mi (0.01 km^{2})
- Elevation: 1,227 ft (374 m)

Population (2020)
  - Total: 2,292
  - Density: 745/sq mi (288/km^{2})
- Time zone: UTC-6 (Central (CST))
  - Summer (DST): UTC-5 (CDT)
- ZIP code: 76360
- Area code: 940
- FIPS code: 48-22984
- GNIS feature ID: 2410419
- Website: cityofelectra.gov

Electra is a city in Wichita County, Texas, United States. It is part of the Wichita Falls metropolitan statistical area. Its population was 2,292 at the 2020 census, down from 2,791 in 2010. Electra claims the title of Pump Jack Capital of Texas, as made official by the state in 2001, and has celebrated an annual Pump Jack Festival since 2002. It was named in honor of Electra Waggoner, an heiress to the Waggoner Ranch. Electra is also known for its Grand Theatre, which was refurbished and is now a functioning theater.

== History ==
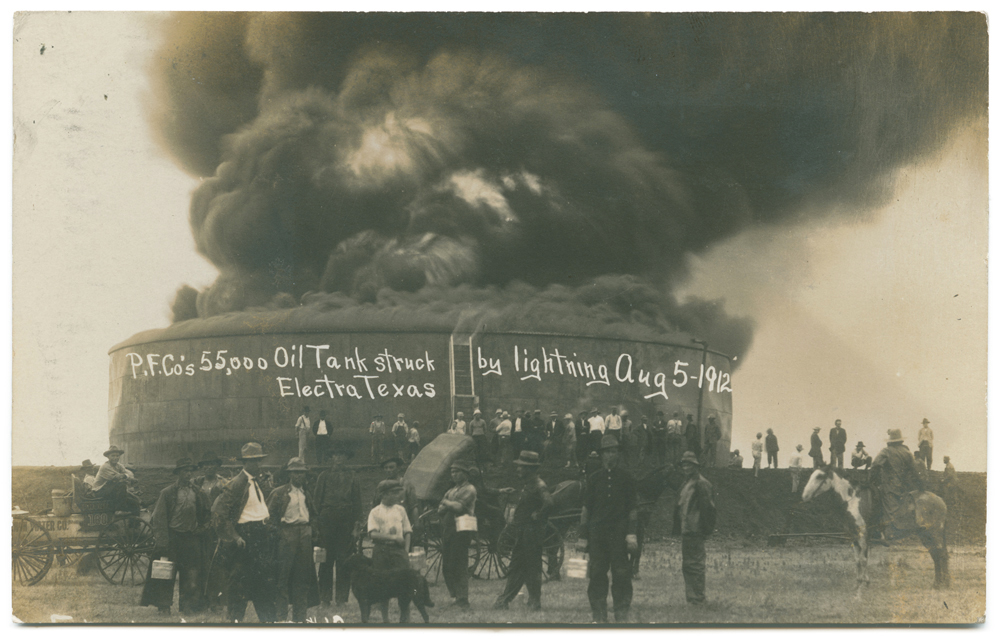
55,000 bbl oil tank struck by lightning, August 5, 1912, Electra, Texas

Daniel Waggoner started a ranch in present-day Electra in 1852. Around 30 years later, the Fort Worth and Denver Railway was built, and its railroad tracks ran through the area. In 1885, Waggoner's son, William Thomas Waggoner, successfully lobbied railroad executives to build a railroad station at the site. By this time, the Waggoner Ranch covered a half-million acres. Until this time, the town was called Waggoner, but following the building of the station and a post office in 1889, it was dubbed Beaver Switch, after the nearby Beaver Creek. The opening of 56,000 acres (230 km^{2}) of land north of the railroad station brought more farmers to the area. The town was renamed again in 1907, this time after Waggoner's daughter, Electra Waggoner.

Water can be scarce in this region of Texas, so Waggoner started drilling for water for the town's new residents. Most of these drilling sites were befouled by crude oil, which made the water unfit for drinking. Three years later, a developer from Fort Worth named Solomon Williams bought the land from Waggoner. Soon thereafter, he annexed nearby land, subdivided it, and placed advertisements in national media trying to increase the population. His efforts were successful, and the town grew from a population of 500 to 1,000 between 1907 and 1910. The Waggoner family still owns much of the same land they did in the beginning and still drills for oil there.

In 1911, the Electra Independent School District was created.

On April 1, 1911, the Clayco Oil gusher brought in an oil strike at a depth of 1,600 feet (490 m), producing 260 barrels of oil per day. Word spread quickly, and the population increased to over 1,000, with many more oil workers commuting from Wichita Falls. The town soon had brick buildings, concrete sidewalks, and a telephone exchange.

In 1936, Electra had well over 6,000 residents, but by the 1960s, the population had decreased to just over 5,000. The Dallas-Fort Worth Metroplex was growing, and many people moved away. By 2000, Electra's population had fallen to about 3,000.

== Geography ==
According to the United States Census Bureau, the city has a total area of 2.4 mi^{2} (6.3 km^{2}), all land.

=== Climate ===
The climate in this area is characterized by hot, humid summers and generally mild to cool winters. According to the Köppen climate classification, Electra has a humid subtropical climate, Cfa on climate maps.

== Demographics ==
Historical population
Census	Pop.	Note	%±
1910	640		—
1920	4,744		641.3%
1930	6,712		41.5%
1940	5,588		−16.7%
1950	4,970		−11.1%
1960	4,759		−4.2%
1970	3,895		−18.2%
1980	3,755		−3.6%
1990	3,113		−17.1%
2000	3,168		1.8%
2010	2,791		−11.9%
2020	2,292		−17.9%
U.S. Decennial Census

=== 2020 census ===
As of the 2020 census, 2,292 people, 1,000 households, and 606 families resided in the city, and the median age was 44.6 years; 22.1% of residents were under the age of 18 and 22.1% were 65 years of age or older.

For every 100 females there were 92.3 males, and for every 100 females age 18 and over there were 89.9 males age 18 and over.

0.0% of residents lived in urban areas, while 100.0% lived in rural areas.

There were 1,000 households in Electra, of which 26.9% had children under the age of 18 living in them. Of all households, 38.6% were married-couple households, 21.7% were households with a male householder and no spouse or partner present, and 33.0% were households with a female householder and no spouse or partner present. About 34.1% of all households were made up of individuals and 15.7% had someone living alone who was 65 years of age or older.

There were 1,210 housing units, of which 17.4% were vacant. The homeowner vacancy rate was 6.2% and the rental vacancy rate was 13.6%.

Racial composition as of the 2020 census
Race	Number	Percent
White	1,841	80.3%
Black or African American	119	5.2%
American Indian and Alaska Native	13	0.6%
Asian	12	0.5%
Native Hawaiian and Other Pacific Islander	0	0.0%
Some other race	116	5.1%
Two or more races	191	8.3%
Hispanic or Latino (of any race)	309	13.5%

== Education ==
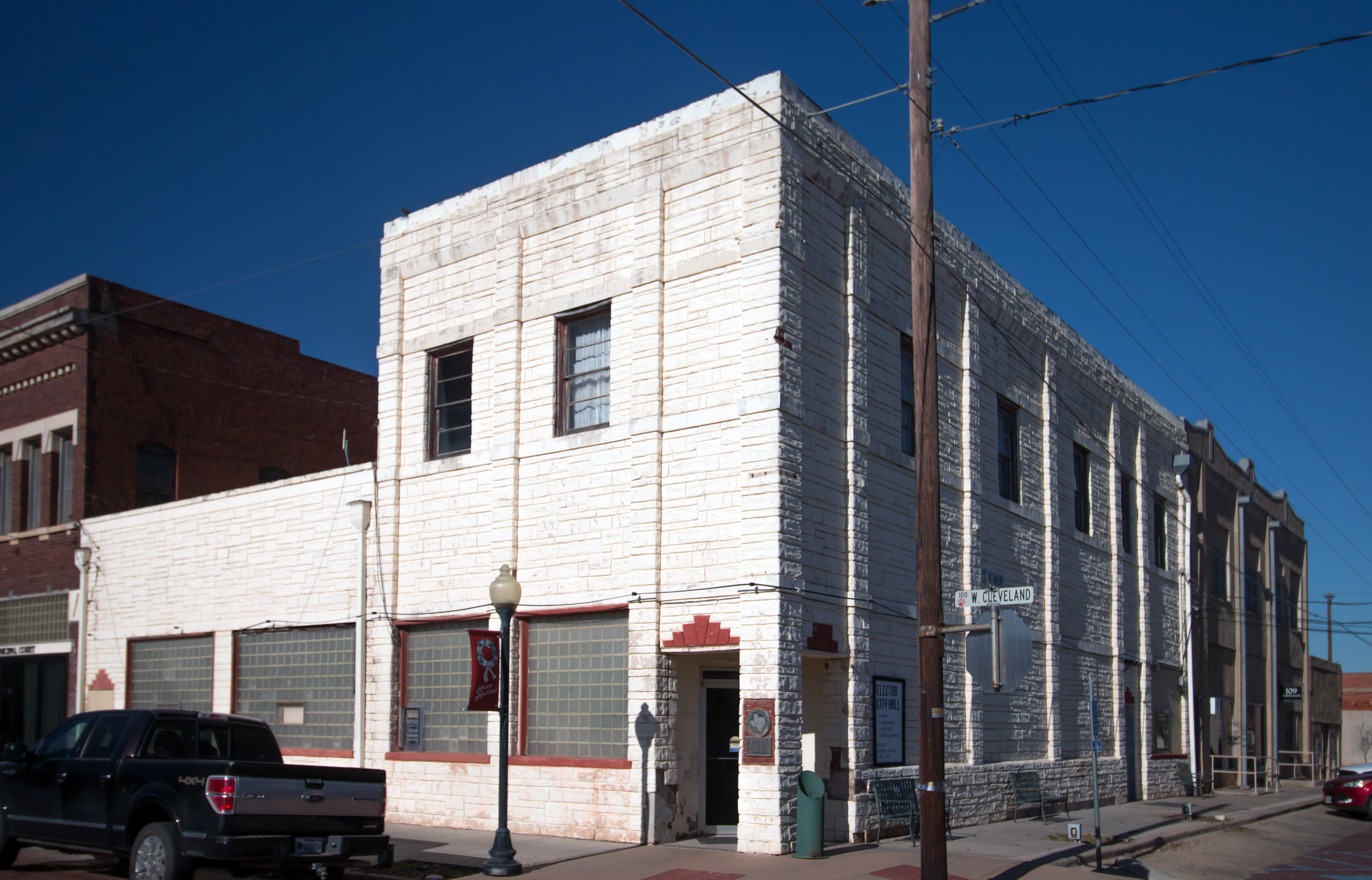
The Electra State Bank Building was built in 1908.

The City of Electra is served by the Electra Independent School District, an area of 210 sq mi (540 km^{2}).

The three public schools are: B.M. Dinsmore Elementary School, with 225 students enrolled in prekindergarten through fourth grade; Electra Junior High with 172 students in grades five through eight; and Electra High School with 149 students enrolled in ninth through 12th grades. Electra High School's athletic teams are called the Tigers. The student/teacher ratio at each of the schools is 14:1, 13:1, and 9:1, respectively.

== Notable persons ==
- Stanley Kroenke, a billionaire sports magnate, married into the Walton family, founders of Walmart.
- Ace Reid, an artist and humorist, grew up and lived in Electra until 1943, when he joined the Navy.

== Utilities ==
- Telephone and Internet are provided by Hilliary Communications.
