= Electra Independent School District =

School district in Texas, United States

Electra Independent School District is a public school district based in Electra, Texas, United States. In 2007 and 2009, the district received a rating of "academically acceptable" from the Texas Education Agency.

== Schools ==
- Electra High School (grades 7-12)
- Electra Elementary, Junior & High School (pre-kindergarten-grade 6)
