= Electra High School =

Coordinates: 34.0302°N 98.9134°W

Location
- 200 Andeson Ave; Electra, Wichita, Texas 76360-2799; United States

Information
- School type: Public high school
- School district: Electra Independent School District
- Superintendent: Don Hasley
- Principal: Jamie West
- Staff: 22.54 (FTE)
- Grades: 7–12
- Enrollment: 198 (2023–2024)
- Student to teacher ratio: 8.78
- Colors: Red and White
- Athletics conference: UIL Class 2A
- Mascot: Tiger
- Website: www.electraisd.net/jhhs-home

Electra High School is a public high school in Electra, Texas. It is part of the Electra Independent School District located in western Wichita County. In 2013, Electra High School was rated "Improvement Required" by the Texas Education Agency.

== Student demographics ==
As of the 2005–2006 school year, Electra High School had a total of 165 students. Of the students, 76.4% were white, 15.2% were Hispanic, 7.3% were African American, 0.6% were Asian/Pacific Islander, and 0.6% were Native American.

== Athletics ==
The Electra Tigers and Lady Tigers compete in cross country, volleyball, football, basketball, power lifting, golf, tennis, track, softball, and baseball.

=== State titles ===
- Football
  - 1985(2A)
- Boys Track
  - 1919(1A), 1923(1A), 1927(All)

== Organizations ==
Band, One-Act Play, NHS, Student Council, Cheerleading, FFA, FCA, Yearbook, and Newspaper

=== State titles ===
- Electra Tiger Pride Band
  - 2007 (state-finalist under Kenneth Gilbreath), 2011 (state-participant under Jim Strahan)
- One-Act Play (1A)
  - "Home Fires" by Jack Heifner (2010), "Sending Down The Sparrows" by Laura Lundgren Smith (2011) (participants under Janis Blackwell and Brenda Beebe)
- Speech and Debate (1A)
  - Under the direction of Brenda Beebe, Electra High School obtained three consecutive district speech team championships (2010–2012) and a regional championship (2012). Two students advanced to the State UIL Championships, Joe Hatfield and Bre'Onna Word. The team placed 4th in Texas in 2012.
  - 4th ranked UIL State Speech Team (2012).
  - Joe Hatfield (2012) — State Champion in Informative Speaking and State Champion Runner-Up in Lincoln Douglas Debate.
  - Bre'Onna Word (2012) — 6th in State in Prose Interpretation.

== Alumni ==
- Rudy Perez 1989, Valedictorian, Current H.E.B. Food and Drug Executive
- Robert Craighead, Jr. Class of 1979 Hollywood Actor, Singer, Producer
