= Guy Waggoner =

American rancher (1883–1950)

- Born: September 21, 1883; Decatur, Texas, U.S.
- Died: December 11, 1950 (aged 67); Vernon, Texas, U.S.
- Resting place: Oakwood Cemetery, Fort Worth, Texas
- Occupations: Rancher, business executive
- Spouse: Anne Valliant Burnett Tandy (divorced)
- Children: 2
- Parent(s): William Thomas Waggoner; Ella (Halsell) Waggoner
- Relatives: Electra Waggoner (sister); E. Paul Waggoner (brother)

Guy Leslie Waggoner (September 21, 1883 – December 11, 1950) was an American rancher and business executive. He inherited one-fourth of the Waggoner Ranch in Texas. Later, he owned the Bell Ranch in New Mexico. He served as Chairman of the Texas Racing Commission and later Chairman of the New Mexico Racing Commission.

== Early life ==
Guy Waggoner was born on September 21, 1883. His father, William Thomas Waggoner, was the owner of the Waggoner Ranch in Texas. His mother was Ella (Halsell) Waggoner. He had a brother, E. Paul Waggoner and a sister, Electra Waggoner. They grew up at the Waggoner Mansion (a.k.a. 'El Castile') in Decatur as well as on the Waggoner Ranch.

== Career ==
Waggoner inherited one fourth of the Waggoner Ranch. While living on the ranch, he served as Chairman of the Texas Racing Commission.

Waggoner then purchased the Bell Ranch in San Miguel County, New Mexico. In the 1930s, he built a 10,300 square foot hacienda on the ranch, which still stands today. He became the Chairman of the New Mexico Racing Commission in 1939.

== Personal life ==
Waggoner married eight times. One of his wives was Anne Burnett, the heiress of the 6666 Ranch. They wed on September 4, 1922. They later divorced. He had two children from other marriages.

== Death and legacy ==
Waggoner died on December 11, 1950, at the age of sixty-seven. After his death, his two children sold their share of the Waggoner Ranch to their cousins. They also sold the Bell Ranch to Harriet Keeney of Connecticut, who later sold it to William N. Lane II, the Chief Executive Office of the General Binding Corporation. In 2010, it was purchased by Silver Spur Ranches, a ranching and beef company owned by John C. Malone.
