= Daniel Waggoner =

American rancher (1828–1902)

- Born: July 7, 1828; Lincoln County, Tennessee, U.S.
- Died: September 5, 1902 (aged 74); Colorado Springs, Colorado, U.S.
- Occupations: Settler, rancher, businessman, banker
- Spouse(s): Nancy (Moore) Waggoner; Sicily Ann (Halsell) Waggoner
- Children: William Thomas Waggoner
- Parent(s): Solomon Waggoner; Elizabeth (McGaugh) Waggoner
- Relatives: Guy Waggoner (grandson); Electra Waggoner (granddaughter); E. Paul Waggoner (grandson); Albert Buckman Wharton III (great-great-grandson)

Daniel Waggoner (July 7, 1828 – September 5, 1902) was an early American settler and rancher in Texas. He also owned five banks, three cottonseed oil mills, and a coal company. He established the Waggoner Ranch, which spanned eight counties: Wise County, Clay County, Wichita County, Wilbarger County, Foard County, Baylor County, Archer County, and Knox County. In 1959, he was inducted into the Hall of Great Westerners of the National Cowboy & Western Heritage Museum.

== Early life ==
Daniel Waggoner was born on July 7, 1828, in Lincoln County, Tennessee. His father, Solomon Waggoner, was a farmer, cattleman, and horse and slave trader. His mother was Elizabeth (McGaugh) Waggoner. He moved to Hopkins County, Texas, with his parents in 1848.

== Career ==
In the 1850s, he moved from Hopkins County to Wise County, Texas with his son, an African slave, six horses and 242 Longhorn cattle. They settled on Catlett Creek, near Decatur. The land was 'open range' when they first arrived.

In 1856, he purchased 320 acres of land near Cactus Hill, and moved his family there. He later purchased more land on Denton Creek, seven miles east of Decatur. Each time, the whole family moved with him. Over the next three decades, he purchased more land in Wise County as well as Clay, Wichita, Wilbarger, Foard, Baylor, Archer, and Knox Counties.

Some of the land was acquired after he sent gunslinger Jimmie Roberts to intimidate small farmers into selling it to them. However, many sold it willingly, as a drought was occurring at the time. Many of those small farmers moved to Lockett, Texas, where they enjoyed access to the Seymour Aquifer. Waggoner's landholdings became known as the Waggoner Ranch. The ranch operated under the company name of Waggoner and Son. With his son, he also owned five banks, three cottonseed oil mills, and a coal company.

== Personal life and death ==
He was married twice. His first wife was Nancy (Moore) Waggoner, the daughter of William Moore, whom he married in the late 1840s. They had a son, William Thomas Waggoner. He became a widower shortly thereafter.

In 1859, he married Sicily Ann (Halsell) Waggoner, the daughter of Electious and Elizabeth J. Halsell. She was only 16 years old at the time, while he was 31. In 1883, he built the Waggoner Mansion, also known as El Castile, in Decatur, where he resided with his family.

He died of kidney disease on September 5, 1902, in Colorado Springs, Colorado.
