= Waggoner Mansion =

Historic house in Texas, United States

- U.S. National Register of Historic Places
- Recorded Texas Historic Landmark
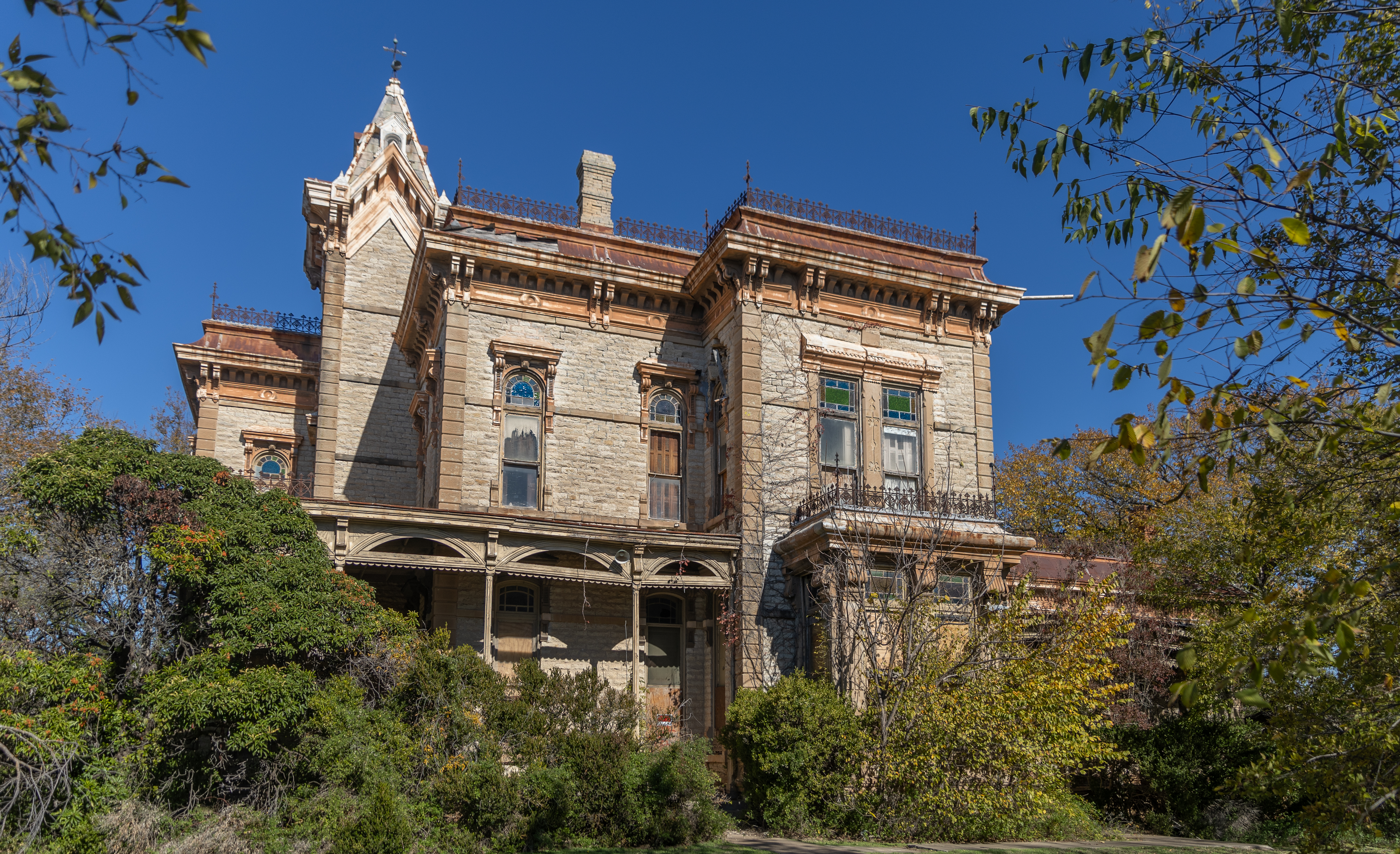
- Waggoner Mansion in 2024

- Location within Texas Location within the United States
- Location: 1003 E. Main; Decatur, Texas
- Coordinates: 33°14′3″N 97°34′37″W
- Area: 9 acres (3.6 ha)
- Built: 1883
- Architectural style: Late Victorian
- NRHP reference No.: 74002098
- RTHL No.: 4

Significant dates
- Added to NRHP: May 1, 1974
- Designated RTHL: 1962

The Waggoner Mansion (a.k.a. El Castile) is a historic mansion in Decatur, Texas. The sixteen room mansion was built in 1883 by the Waggoner Family. It was purchased in 1942 by Mr. and Mrs. Phil Luker.

== Location ==
The mansion is located at 1003 East Main in Decatur, a town in Wise County, Texas. It spans thirteen and a half acres of land.

== History ==
The mansion was built in 1883 for Daniel Waggoner, owner of the Waggoner Ranch. It was designed in the Victorian architectural style. It comprises sixteen rooms and six bathrooms, with two bedrooms on the first floor and four bedrooms on the second floor.

The house was inherited by Daniel Waggoner's son, William Thomas Waggoner. In 1942, it was purchased by Mrs and Mr Phil Luker.

It is listed on the National Register of Historic Places.

== See also ==
- National Register of Historic Places listings in Wise County, Texas
- Recorded Texas Historic Landmarks in Wise County
- Wagoner Branch
