= Waggoner Ranch =

Cattle ranch in Texas, US

Coordinates: 33.9°N 99.0°W

W. T. Waggoner Estate
- Interactive map of the W. T. Waggoner Estate area

General information
- Location: United States of America
- Construction started: 1849
- Owner: Stan Kroenke

Technical details
- Grounds: 520,527 acres

The Waggoner Ranch is a historic ranch located 13 miles south of Vernon, Texas, in north Texas near the Red River and Oklahoma border. Founded in 1852 by Daniel Waggoner, it is the largest ranch within one fence in the United States. The land has been used to raise crops, beef cattle, and horses and to produce oil.

In February 2016, it was acquired by Stan Kroenke, husband of Ann Walton (niece of Sam Walton).

== Location ==
The ranch is located west of Wichita Falls, Texas, south of Vernon, near the Red River. Other towns nearby include Electra and Seymour.

It encloses 520,527 acres (211,000 ha; 813 sq mi; 2,110 km^{2}) of land. It is the second-largest ranch in Texas, after the King Ranch. It spans six counties and is half as large as Rhode Island. Parts of it can be seen from highways U.S. 183 and 283.

== History ==
The ranch was founded in 1852 near Vernon, Texas, by Daniel Waggoner under the name of Dan Waggoner & Son, which included his newborn son William Thomas "W.T." Waggoner. Ranching operations began with 230 longhorn cattle and some horses. From 1889 to 1903, they acquired land in Wichita County, Wilbarger County, Foard County, Knox County, Baylor County and Archer County.

After Daniel Waggoner died in 1902, his son W.T. acquired more land. At its largest, the ranch spanned more than a million acres of land. By 1903, he sold some of the land near China Creek to developers. Although it still spans six counties, it is primarily centered on Wichita County and Wilbarger County. W.T. Waggoner raised Quarter Horses on the ranch, including Poco Bueno, who was buried on the ranch. In 1902, W.T. Waggoner found oil while drilling for water.

By 1909, W.T. Waggoner divided the Waggoner Ranch into four subsections: one for himself (White Face); and three smaller 8,500 acre sub-ranches for his children: Zacaweista, Four Corners, and Santa Ros. However, in 1923, he changed his mind, and set up a Massachusetts trust. His children would elect a board of trustees, who would make decisions with him at the helm.

After W.T. Waggoner's death, his three children, Guy Waggoner, E. Paul Waggoner, and Electra Waggoner each inherited a section of the ranch, although there was still a board of trustees. Guy Waggoner lived there with his wife Anne Burnett, the daughter of cattle baron and oilman Samuel Burk Burnett and heiress of the 6666 Ranch, from 1922 until their divorce in 1928. E. Paul Waggoner raised Quarter Horses on the ranch. Electra Waggoner mostly resided at Thistle Hill in Fort Worth, although her husband, Albert Buck Wharton, operated a livery yard and horse stables on the ranch.

When Guy Waggoner died in 1950, his sons sold their share of the estate to members of the family. Specifically, this went to Albert Buckman Wharton, Jr., also known as Buster Wharton, who was Electra Waggoner's son, and Electra Waggoner Biggs, who was E. Paul Waggoner's daughter. Buster raised polo ponies and established the El Ranchio Polo Club on the ranch. He once played there with polo champion Cecil Smith. Meanwhile, Electra Waggoner Biggs became a renowned sculptor.

In 1991, Electra Waggoner Biggs sued to be able to sell the ranch. Her second cousin, Albert Buckman Wharton III, also known as Bucky Wharton, who was Buster Wharton's son, appealed to stop the liquidation. After Electra's death, her share was inherited by her daughter Helen Biggs and her husband, Gene Willingham.

The ranch has been surveyed by the United States Department of Agriculture for matters of preservation. Thirty cowboys, and about 120 people overall, are employed on the property. It has about 14,000 cows and bulls as well as 500 horses. It also includes a 367 MW wind farm, 30,000 acres of arable land and about 1,100 producing oil wells. One of the lakes on the ranch provides water for the City of Wichita Falls.

In August 2014, the ranch was listed on the real estate market with an asking price of US$725 million. It was sold in February 2016 to billionaire Stan Kroenke, the husband of Wal-Mart heiress Ann Walton Kroenke. At the time the ranch comprised 520,527 acres (210,650 ha), or 813 mi^{2} (2,110 km^{2}); additional acreage included in the sale brought the total close to 535,000 acres (217,000 ha).
