= William Thomas Waggoner =

American rancher, oilman, banker, horsebreeder and philanthropist

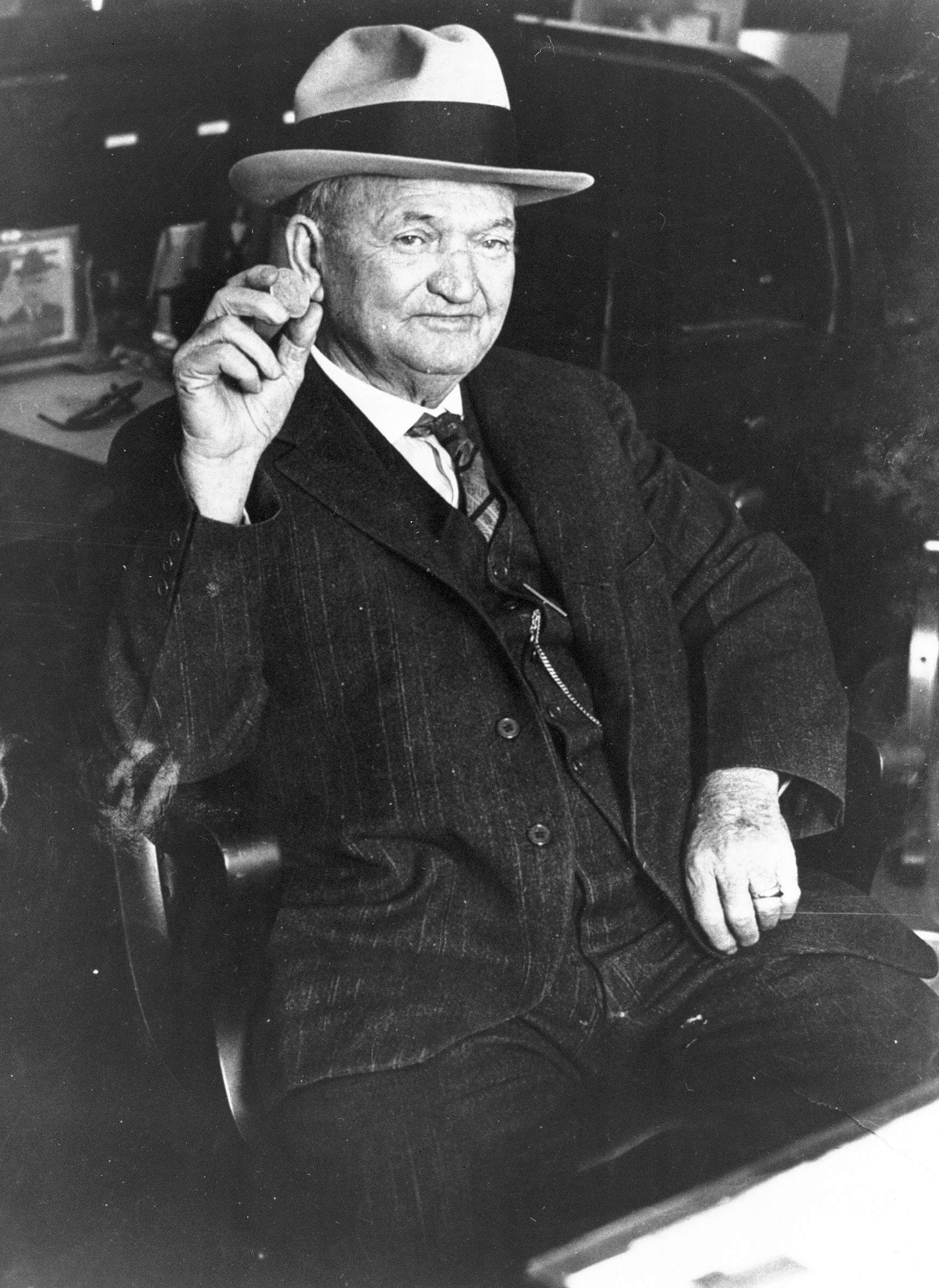
- Born: August 31, 1852; Hopkins County, Texas, U.S.
- Died: December 11, 1934 (aged 82); Fort Worth, Texas, U.S.
- Resting place: Oakwood Cemetery, Fort Worth, Texas
- Occupations: Rancher, oilman, banker, horsebreeder, philanthropist
- Spouse: Ella (Halsell) Waggoner
- Children: Electra Waggoner; Guy Waggoner; E. Paul Waggoner
- Parent(s): Daniel Waggoner; Nancy (Moore) Waggoner
- Relatives: Sicily Ann (Halsell) Waggoner (stepmother and adoptive mother); Albert Buckman Wharton III (great-grandson)

William Thomas Waggoner (August 31, 1852 – December 11, 1934) was an American rancher, oilman, banker, horse breeder, and philanthropist from Texas. He was the owner of the Waggoner Ranch, where he found oil in 1903. He was the founding president of the Waggoner National Bank of Vernon. He established the Arlington Downs and paid for the construction of three buildings on the campus of Texas Woman's University.

== Early life ==
William Thomas Waggoner was born on August 31, 1852, in Hopkins County, Texas. His father, Daniel Waggoner, was a rancher. His mother was Nancy (Moore) Waggoner. His paternal grandfather, Solomon Waggoner (1804 - 1849), had been a cattleman, farmer, and horse and slave trader.

== Ranching ==
In 1869, when he was only 18 years old, his father gave him US$12 and asked him to drive 5000 steers to Abilene, Kansas. He sold them for a profit of $55,000. By 1879, he became the manager of the ranch holdings in Wilbarger County, Texas, near China Creek.

Upon his father's death in 1902, he inherited landholdings in Wise County and Wilbarger Counties, as well as Clay, Wichita, Foard, Baylor, Archer, and Knox Counties. Waggoner also used part of the Big Pasture in Oklahoma, which he leased from Comanche Chief Quanah Parker. In 1905, alongside rancher Samuel Burk Burnett, he went wolf hunting with President Theodore Roosevelt on the Big Pasture. The two ranchers were hoping to persuade him to keep the land as open range. However impressed President Roosevelt was with the adventure, that did not happen.

While drilling for water on the Waggoner Ranch, he found oil in 1903. By 1911, he had formed Waggoner Refinery, an oil refinery company for extraction of the oil from his landholdings.

As he grew older, Waggoner decided to subdivide his ranch holdings and give a portion to each of his children. Indeed, he wanted them to learn how to take care of the land that would later become theirs. As a result, by 1909, he divided the Waggoner Ranch into four subsections, White Face for himself, and three smaller 8,500 acre subranches for his children: Zacaweista, Four Corners, and Santa Ros. However, in 1923, he changed his mind, and set up a Massachusetts trust. His children would elect a board of trustees, who would make decisions, with him at the helm.

== Banking ==
In 1893, he served as vice president of the R.C. Neal Banking Company, founded by Neal in Vernon. He served as the founding president of the Waggoner National Bank of Vernon from 1899 to 1907. In 1904, he also joined the board of directors of the First National Bank of Fort Worth.

== Three D's Stock Farm ==
Three D's Stock Farm was W. T. Waggoner and his sons' breeding and racing arm for Thoroughbred horses. He also built the Arlington Downs racetrack located between Fort Worth and Dallas.

Waggoner once tried to purchase Man o' War for US$500,000, but the transaction did not go through. However, he purchased other good horses such as Yellow Jacket, Yellow Wolf, Midnight, Blackburn, and Pretty Boy. Among the horses the Three D's operation bred was Now What, the American Champion Two-Year-Old Filly of 1939.

Important stakes races won by Three D's Stock Farm horses included the Arlington Oaks, Louisiana Derby, New Orleans Handicap, and Washington Park Handicap. They also owned horses that competed in the 1929, 1930, 1932, 1933 and 1937 Kentucky Derbies. Their best result came in 1929, when their colt Panchio ran third under future U. S. Racing Hall of Fame jockey Frank Coltiletti.

== Philanthropy ==
He paid for the construction of three buildings on the campus of Texas Woman's University in Denton. Meanwhile, in 1933, the City of Fort Worth awarded him the honorary title of First Citizen of Fort Worth.

== Personal life ==
He married Ella (Halsell) Waggoner, a younger sister of his stepmother, Sicily Ann (Halsell) Waggoner. They resided at the Waggoner Mansion, also known as El Castile, in Decatur, which he restored in 1931. Later, they also resided in Fort Worth. They had sons Guy Waggoner and E. Paul Waggoner and daughter Electra Waggoner.

== Death ==
He died on December 11, 1934, in Fort Worth, Texas. He was buried near the grave of Samuel Burk Burnett.
